= Aaron Van Cleave =

German pair skater (born 1987)

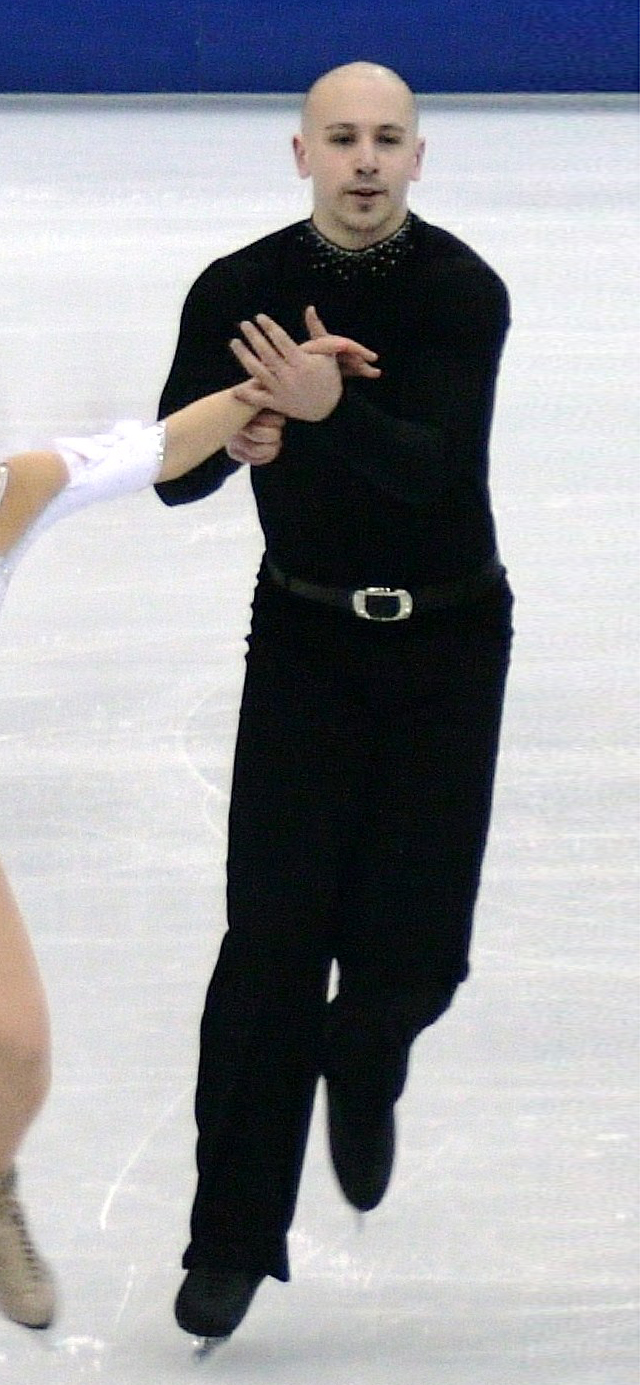

Personal information
- Born: 14 March 1987 (age 39) Comox, British Columbia, Canada
- Height: 1.80 m (5 ft 11 in)

Figure skating career
- Country: Germany
- Partner: Tatiana Domracheva
- Coach: Knut Schubert
- Skating club: SC Berlin

Aaron Van Cleave (born 14 March 1987) is a German pair skater. He is best known for his partnership with Mari Vartmann for Germany. They won the 2015 German national title, the 2011 NRW Trophy, and 2010 Warsaw Cup. After they parted ways, he teamed up with Tatiana Domracheva.

== Personal life ==
Van Cleave was born on 14 March 1987 in Comox, British Columbia, Canada. He was born both a Canadian and American citizen. He became a German citizen in January 2014.

== Career ==
=== In North America ===
Van Cleave first competed with Lauren Cowley at the Canadian Junior Championships, appearing on the juvenile level in 2002 and pre-novice in 2003. With Sarah McCoy, he represented Canada on the ISU Junior Grand Prix series. They were assigned to Norway in 2006 and the United States in 2007.

Van Cleave then teamed up with Ameena Sheikh where they represented the United States. The team trained in Detroit, Michigan at the Detroit Skating Club under Yuka Sato and Jason Dunjeon. Van Cleave and Sheikh Competed on the junior level and senior level at the 2009 U.S. Championships and the 2010 U.S. Championships

=== In Germany ===
In 2010, Van Cleave teamed up with Mari Vartmann to compete for Germany. The pair made their international debut at the 2010 Warsaw Cup where they won the gold medal. Their first major international event was the 2012 European Championships. On 26 January, during the morning practice before the long programs, Vartmann collided with Daniel Wende while they were attempting to avoid a French couple. Vartmann and Van Cleave finished 5th at the event. They were coached by Knut Schubert in Berlin.

Vartmann and Van Cleave withdrew from the 2012 Nebelhorn Trophy following the short program – Vartmann picked into her right foot when she fell on a throw triple loop during the short and was unable to put on her skate the next day due to swelling. They withdrew from the 2012 Coupe de Nice and their first assigned Grand Prix event, the 2012 Cup of Russia, after Van Cleave sustained a broken cheekbone while catching Vartmann on a triple twist. They later withdrew from their second GP, the 2012 NHK Trophy.

The pair was coached by Knut Schubert and Stefan Lindemann in Berlin in the first half of the 2014–15 season. In December 2014, they joined Maylin Wende and Daniel Wende in Oberstdorf. They won the pairs title at the 2015 German Championships.

His new partner is Tatiana Domracheva from Russia.

== Programs ==
(with Vartmann)

Season	Short program	Free skating	Exhibition
2014–15	Waltz from Petersburg Secrets (Петербургские тайны) by Andrei Petrov	Concierto de Aranjuez by Joaquín Rodrigo	
2013–14	Where the light gets in by Sennen	Notre-Dame de Paris by Riccardo Cocciante	Skyfall by Adele
2012–13	The Messiah Will Come Again by Gary Moore	The Passion of the Christ by John Debney; Blood and Glory by Audiomachine	
2011–12	Sarabande (modern arrangement) by George Frideric Handel	The Island by Steve Jablonsky; Epicon by Globus	Le temps des cathédrales (from Notre-Dame de Paris) by Riccardo Cocciante
2010–11	The Untouchables by Ennio Morricone	The Island by Steve Jablonsky; Epicon by Globus	

== Competitive highlights ==
GP: Grand Prix; JGP: Junior Grand Prix

=== With Vartmann ===
International
Event	10–11	11–12	12–13	13–14	14–15
Worlds		14th	16th		15th
Europeans		5th	8th	9th	7th
GP Cup of Russia			WD		
GP NHK Trophy			WD		5th
GP Skate Canada				7th	8th
Bavarian Open	3rd		3rd		
Challenge Cup			3rd		
Cup of Nice		6th	WD		3rd
Golden Spin	5th				
Ice Challenge		2nd			
Lombardia Trophy				6th	
Nebelhorn Trophy		8th	WD	3rd	
NRW Trophy	4th	1st	5th		
Warsaw Cup	1st				
National
German Champ.	2nd	2nd	2nd	3rd	1st
WD = Withdrew

=== With Sheikh ===
International
Event	2010–11
US. Championships	8th J
J = Junior level

=== With McCoy ===
International
Event	2005–06	2006–07	2007–08
JGP Norway		10th	
JGP United States			6th
National
Canadian Champ.	6th J	3rd J	
J = Junior level

=== With Cowley ===
National
Event	2001–02	2002–03
Canadian Junior Champ.	8th V	10th P
Levels: V = Juvenile; P = Pre-novice
