= Tree of Life (album) =

Studio album by Audiomachine
- Released: July 16, 2013
- Length: 1:01:27
- Producer: Paul Dinletir

Audiomachine chronology
Helios (2012)	Tree of Life (2013)	Existence (2013)

Tree of Life is an album by American group Audiomachine, released on 16 July 2013. The album peaked at number two on the Billboard Top Classical Albums chart.

== Track listing ==
No.	Title	Length
1.	"Above and Beyond"	2:53
2.	"Tree of Life"	2:03
3.	"An Unfinished Life"	2:05
4.	"Breaking Through"	1:20
5.	"Equinox"	2:27
6.	"The Fire Within"	2:27
7.	"Life Chronicles"	2:26
8.	"Solstice Sun"	2:20
9.	"The Truth"	3:24
10.	"Homecoming"	3:14
11.	"Apotheosis"	2:47
12.	"Turning Point"	2:54
13.	"Rebirth"	2:18
14.	"Age of Innocence"	2:30
15.	"Hallowed Dawn"	1:59
16.	"Hope and Glory"	2:10
17.	"The New World"	2:03
18.	"Ashes to Ashes"	1:41
19.	"Cry Freedom"	2:35
20.	"Day One"	2:05
21.	"The Great Unknown"	1:54
22.	"Remember the Titans"	2:18
23.	"Across the Horizon"	2:25
24.	"The Legend Begins"	2:20
25.	"Leaving the Nest"	2:13
26.	"Final Hope"	2:36

== Charts ==
Chart	Peak position
US Top Classical Albums (Billboard)	2
