= Phenomena (Audiomachine album) =

Studio album by Audiomachine
- Released: May 6, 2014
- Length: 54:42

Audiomachine chronology
Existence (2013)	Phenomena (2014)	Magnus (2015)

Phenomena is an album by American group Audiomachine, released on 6 May 2014. The album peaked at #2 on the American Top Classical Albums chart and #47 on Heatseekers Albums chart.

== Track listing ==
Phenomena
No.	Title	Length
1.	"Blood and Stone"	3:26
2.	"Ice of Phoenix"	3:49
3.	"Red Sorrow"	4:05
4.	"Whispers of Wonders"	3:52
5.	"Deep Heart"	2:59
6.	"Legends of Destiny"	2:39
7.	"Seeds of Promise"	2:41
8.	"Lords of Lankhmar"	3:29
9.	"Crossing Destiny"	3:48
10.	"Gathering of the Clans"	1:40
11.	"The Last Ember"	3:56
12.	"Above and Beyond"	2:54
13.	"Drakon's Empire"	2:44
14.	"Fortress of Solitude"	2:18
15.	"Epiphany"	1:56
16.	"God of the Drow"	2:02
17.	"Journey Through the Portal"	2:42
18.	"Legacy of the Lost"	3:42

== Charts ==
Chart	Peak position
Top Classical Albums (Billboard)	2
Heatseekers Albums (Billboard)	47
