= Chronicles (Audiomachine album) =

Studio album by Audiomachine
- Released: March 23, 2012
- Length: 63:01
- Producer: Paul Dinletir

Audiomachine chronology
Chronicles (2012)	Epica (2012)

Chronicles is an album by American group Audiomachine, released on 23 March 2012. The album peaked at number five on the Billboard Top Classical Albums chart.

== Track listing ==
No.	Title	Length
1.	"Guardians At the Gate"	2:08
2.	"Reaching"	3:12
3.	"Akkadian Empire"	1:21
4.	"House Of Cards"	2:48
5.	"11 Days in Hell"	1:09
6.	"Eterna"	1:46
7.	"Veni Vidi Vici"	1:35
8.	"Breath and Life"	1:50
9.	"Creation"	3:15
10.	"Redemption"	1:36
11.	"Beyond Good and Evil"	1:45
12.	"Lost Empire"	2:25
13.	"Sands of Time"	3:52
14.	"Black Cauldron"	3:28
15.	"Lost Generation"	2:11
16.	"Hell's Battalion"	1:16
17.	"Red Warrior"	2:19
18.	"Lachrimae"	1:52
19.	"Legions of Doom"	2:29
20.	"Road to Glory"	1:52
21.	"Army of Kings"	2:30
22.	"Lost Raiders"	1:51
23.	"Battle of the Kings"	2:31
24.	"Path to Freedom"	2:27
25.	"Hymn of the Rising"	1:33
26.	"Danuvius"	2:38
27.	"Blood and Glory"	2:17
28.	"The Messenger"	3:05

== Charts ==
Chart	Peak position
US Top Classical Albums (Billboard)	5
