= Magnus (album) =

Studio album by Audiomachine
- Released: June 23, 2015
- Genre: Epic, symphonic
- Length: 1:16:58

Audiomachine chronology
Phenomena (2014)	Magnus (2015)	Decimus: The Abbey Road Sessions (2015)

Magnus is an album by American group Audiomachine, released on 23 June 2015. The album peaked at number two on the Billboard Top Classical Albums chart.

== Track listing ==
No.	Title	Length
1.	"Wars of Faith"	3:53
2.	"Frozen Synapse"	3:06
3.	"Rise of the Black Curtain"	3:58
4.	"Sun and Steel"	2:55
5.	"Slipstream"	2:25
6.	"Sura"	2:23
7.	"Quantum"	2:25
8.	"Momentum"	2:36
9.	"The World is Safe"	3:24
10.	"The Final Hour"	2:05
11.	"When it All Falls Down"	4:07
12.	"Being Alive"	4:23
13.	"Between Heaven and Earth"	4:21
14.	"The Lost Continent"	3:01
15.	"Providence"	3:05
16.	"Red October"	4:23
17.	"Motoneuron"	3:41
18.	"Reparation"	2:57
19.	"Enoch"	2:02
20.	"Rubicon"	3:33
21.	"The Origin of Species"	3:06
22.	"All or Nothing"	3:34
23.	"Atragon"	3:26
24.	"Rise of the Planets"	2:09

== Charts ==
Chart	Peak position
US Top Classical Albums (Billboard)	2
