= Nolan Seegert =

German pair skater (born 1992)

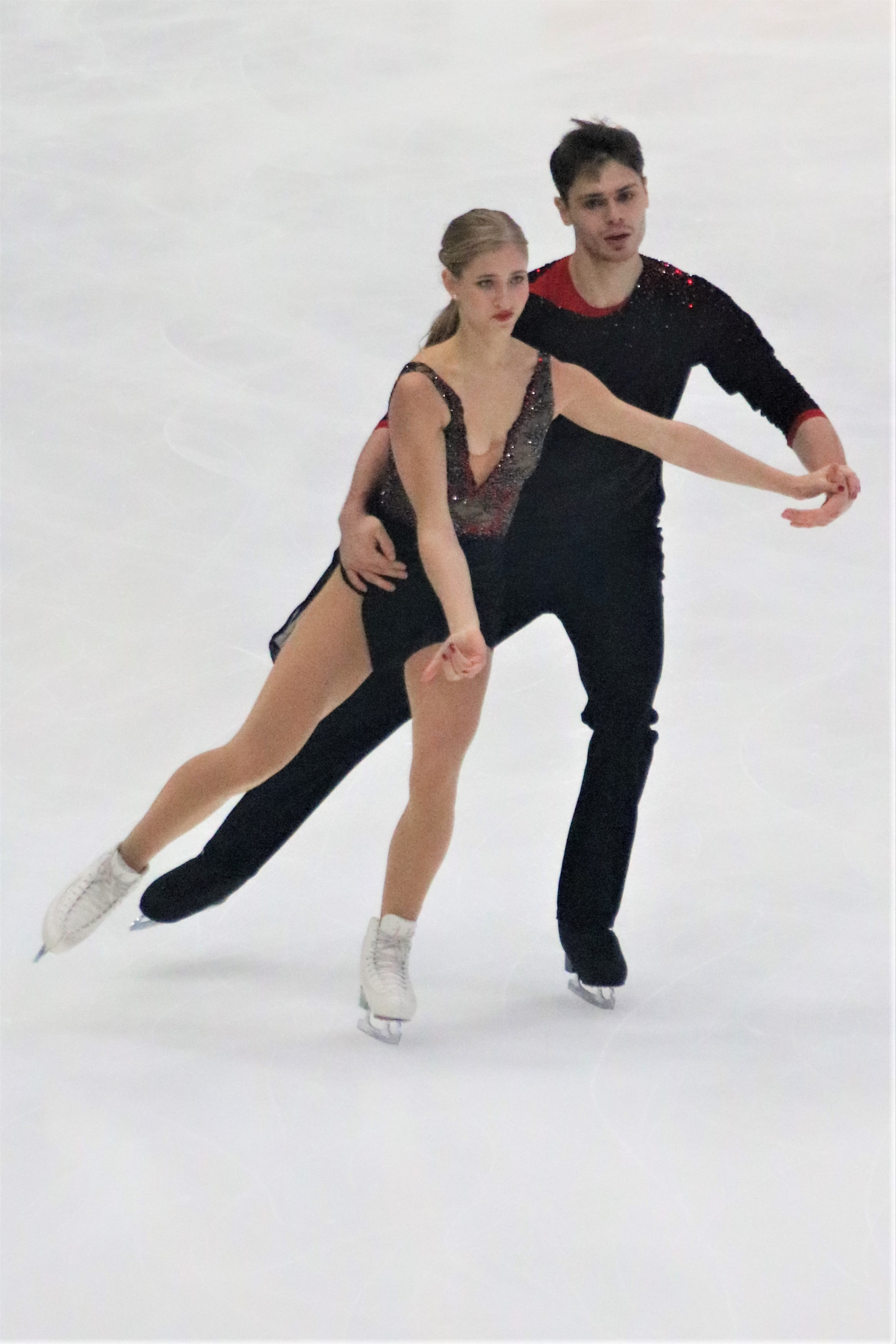
- Hase/Seegert at the 2019 Rostelecom Cup

Personal information
- Born: 11 July 1992 (age 34) Berlin, Germany
- Height: 1.87 m (6 ft 2 in)

Figure skating career
- Country: Germany
- Skating club: SC Berlin
- Began skating: 1999
- Retired: 2023

Nolan Seegert (born 11 July 1992) is a German retired pair skater. With his skating partner, Minerva Fabienne Hase, he was the 2019 Rostelecom Cup bronze medalist, 2021 CS Nebelhorn Trophy champion, and three-time German national champion (2019–20, 2022). The pair represented Germany at the 2022 Winter Olympics.

== Personal life ==
Seegert was born on 11 July 1992 in Berlin. He has studied sports science and biology at Humboldt University Berlin. In 2017, he joined the Bundeswehr's Sportfördergruppe (sports support group).

== Career ==
=== Early career ===
Seegert began learning to skate in 1999. During the 2007–2008 season, he competed with Josephine Klinger in novice pairs. The following season, he continued in the novice ranks with a new partner, Karolin Salatzki. In 2009–2010, Salatzki/Seegert moved up a level and debuted on the ISU Junior Grand Prix (JGP) series. Before ending their partnership, they competed at two more JGP events in 2010–2011.

Seegert's next skating partner was Vanessa Bauer. Making their international debut, the pair won the junior bronze medal at the International Challenge Cup in March 2012. In their second season together, Bauer/Seegert skated at two JGP events and took the junior bronze medal at the 2013 Bavarian Open. Their partnership came to an end after their third season.

=== 2014–2015 season: First season with Hase ===
Seegert teamed up with Minerva Fabienne Hase in 2014. The pair's international debut came in late November, at the 2014 NRW Trophy, where they took the bronze medal. In January 2015, they took bronze at the Toruń Cup before competing at the 2015 European Championships in Stockholm, Sweden; they placed eleventh in the short program, tenth in the free skate, and eleventh overall. They concluded their first season with a bronze at the International Challenge Cup.

=== 2015–2016 season ===
Making their ISU Challenger Series debut, Hase/Seegert placed 6th at the 2015 CS Nebelhorn Trophy. They then won gold at the 2015 NRW Trophy and finished sixth at the 2015 CS Tallinn Trophy. They received silver at the 2016 Sarajevo Open and at the 2016 Bavarian Open.

=== 2016–2017 season ===
In November, Hase/Seegert won gold at the 2016 NRW Trophy and bronze at the 2016 CS Warsaw Cup. The following month, they competed at the German Championships but withdrew following the short program due to an injury to Hase.

In January, Hase/Seegert skated at the 2017 Toruń Cup, placing fourth, and then at the 2017 European Championships in Ostrava; they finished twelfth overall in the Czech Republic after placing thirteenth in the short program and twelfth in the free skate. In March, the pair took bronze at the 2017 Cup of Tyrol before competing at the 2017 World Championships in Helsinki, Finland. They achieved a personal best short program score, of 59.76 points, but their ranking (nineteenth) was insufficient to advance to the final segment.

=== 2017–2018 season ===
In October, Hase/Seegert finished eighth at the 2017 CS Finlandia Trophy and fourth at the 2017 CS Minsk-Arena Ice Star. They outscored Annika Hocke / Ruben Blommaert by 5.77 points for the bronze medal at the 2017 CS Warsaw Cup in November. The following month, the pair won silver behind Aliona Savchenko / Bruno Massot at the German Championships, ranking second in both segments and obtaining 4.33 points more than Hocke/Blommaert. Hase/Seegert were not included in Germany's team to the 2018 Winter Olympics, having finished third overall in the national qualification standings.

Due to a back injury sustained by Hase, the pair was unable to accept a spot at the 2018 European Championships, which became available after Savchenko/Massot withdrew.

=== 2018–2019 season: First national title ===
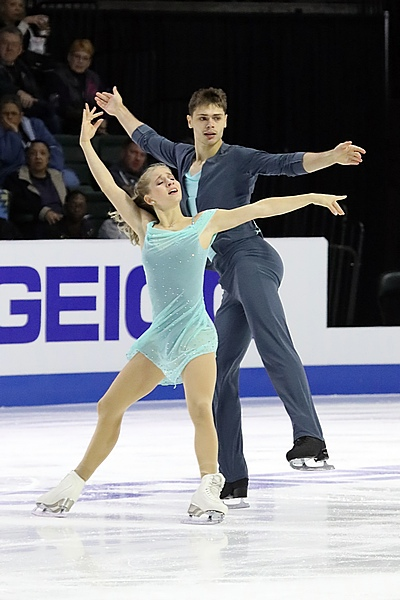
Hase/Seegert at the 2018 Skate America

Hase/Seegert started the new competition season at the 2018 CS Nebelhorn Trophy and finished fourth. The pair received their first Grand Prix invitations. They placed fifth at the 2018 Skate America and seventh at the 2018 Internationaux de France. After participating at the 2018 Golden Spin of Zagreb and placing fourth, they won their first national title at the 2019 German Championships.

Hase/Seegert took sixth place at the 2019 European Championships, and at the 2019 Challenge Cup they won gold at their first international competition with a new best total score of 185.38 points. Hase/Seegert and Hocke/Blommaert were assigned to Germany's two berths at the 2019 World Championships in Saitama. In the short program Hase/Seegert started with a personal best of 64.28 points in the competition and took tenth place. However, an aborted lift towards the end of the free program put them in fourteenth place in that segment (109.76 points); overall, they reached thirteenth place.

=== 2019–2020 season: Grand Prix medal ===
After the pair Hocke/Blommaert announced the end of their common career in April 2019, Hase/Seegert were the only German pair to receive two starting places from the International Skating Union for the 2019–20 Grand Prix season. They placed fifth at the 2019 CS Nebelhorn Trophy, setting new personal bests in the short program and in total score, before placing seventh at the 2019 Internationaux de France. At their second Grand Prix assignment, the 2019 Rostelecom Cup, Hase/Seegert placed fourth in the short program, narrowly behind the new Russian pair of Stolbova/Novoselov. In the free skate, Stolbova/Novoselov performed poorly, while Hase/Seegert nearly equaled their personal best in the segment, placing fourth again, but third overall due to their short program lead over the Austrian team Ziegler/Kiefer. The bronze medal was their first Grand Prix medal, which Seegert called "our biggest moment so far in our career."

After winning the German title for the second consecutive year, Hase/Seegert were assigned to the 2020 European Championships, where they placed fifth in the short program with a new personal best, breaking 70 points in that segment for the first time. Fifth in the free skate as well, they were fifth overall, despite a number of errors that led Hase to deem it "not a good program." This proved to be their final competition for the season, as they had been assigned to compete at the World Championships in Montreal, but these were cancelled as a result of the coronavirus pandemic.

=== 2020–2021 season ===
With the pandemic continuing to affect events, Hase/Seegert made their season debut at the 2020 CS Nebelhorn Trophy, which, due to its being attended only by European pairs, made them the pre-event favourites. They were ranked first after the short program but withdrew before the free skate due to a practice injury.

Hase/Seegert were scheduled to compete in the Grand Prix at the 2020 Internationaux de France, but the event was cancelled due to the pandemic. They were assigned to compete at the 2021 World Championships in Stockholm, but after Hase injured her leg in training, they had to withdraw.

=== 2021–2022 season: Beijing Olympics ===
Recovery from ligament surgery left Hase off the ice for months. They began training in Sochi with new coach Dmitri Savin.

Hase/Seegert began the season at the 2021 CS Nebelhorn Trophy, where they placed second in the short program 0.20 points behind Georgians Safina/Berulava. They were second in the free skate as well, behind Spaniards Barquero/Zandron, but first overall, taking their first Challenger gold. Hase commented on her return to the ice, saying "we did not come here to win, we just were happy to be able to skate again." At their second Challenger event of the season, the 2021 CS Finlandia Trophy, they placed seventh.

At their first Grand Prix assignment, the 2021 Skate Canada International, Hase/Seegert, were third in the short program with a clean skate. A number of imperfect elements in the free skate, particularly Hase's struggles on the throw jumps, dropped them to fifth overall. Hase said afterward "I felt a little bit shaky at the beginning; I was tired. We can still be proud of the program." They were seventh of seven teams at the 2021 NHK Trophy after several errors in both programs. Speaking after the free, Hase said it was "a tough skate for us, mentally and physical. We are not used to skating bad short programs, so it was mentally tough."

After winning their third German national title, Hase/Seegert competed at the 2022 European Championships in Tallinn, finishing eighth.

Hase/Seegert were named as the lone pairs entries for the German Olympic team. However, shortly after arriving in Beijing, Seegert tested positive for COVID-19 and was required to isolate. As a result, they were unable to participate in the Olympic team event, though it remained possible that they would be cleared for the pairs event two weeks later. On February 11, the German Ice Skating Union announced that Seegert had been released from quarantine and would be able to compete. They placed fourteenth in the short program after Hase fell on her jump attempt, qualifying for the free skate. However, due to lack of training time for Seegert during his quarantine, they had a "disastrous" free skate including two aborted lift attempts, finishing last in the free skate and dropping to sixteenth overall. Hase called it "just pure fighting."

Further difficulties awaited the pair immediately after the Olympics, as due to Vladimir Putin's invasion of Ukraine and resulting tensions between Russia and Germany, they were not allowed to return to Russia to train. The International Skating Union banned all Russian and Belarusian skaters from competing at the 2022 World Championships. As well, the Chinese Skating Association opted not to send athletes to compete in Montpellier. As those countries’ athletes comprised the entirety of the top five pairs at the Olympics, this greatly impacted the field. Hase/Seegert were sixth in the short program with a clean skate, with Hase calling it "a program one can end the season with. The audience was very supportive." In the free skate, Seegert put his foot down on a jump and Hase stepped out of a throw, but their 123.32 score was narrowly a new personal best, and they finished fifth overall with another new personal best.

=== Post-competitive career ===
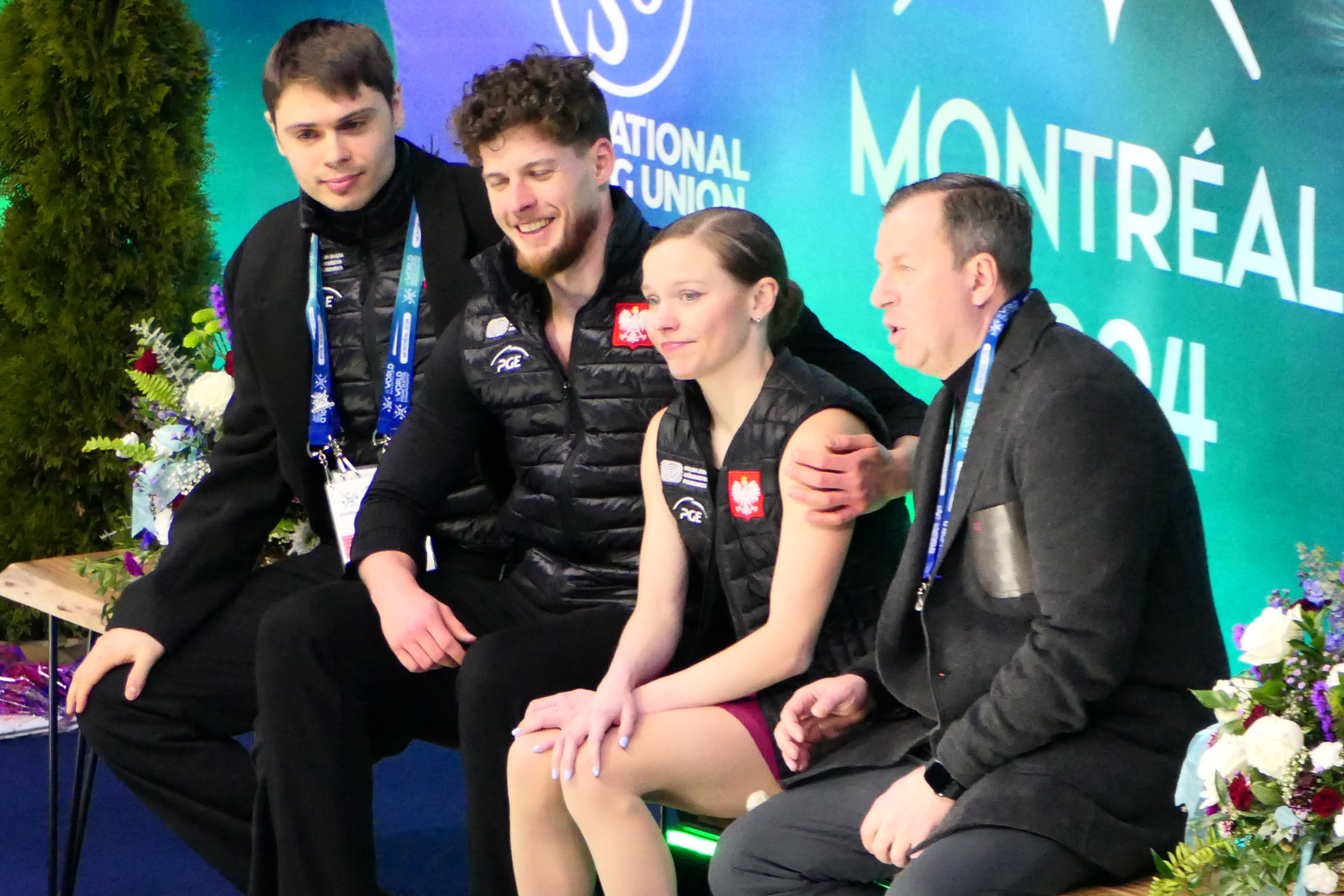
Seegart (far left) in the kiss n' cry with Ioulia Chtchetinina and Michał Woźniak at the 2024 World Championships

Hase and Seegert's partnership came to an end following the Olympic season. Seegert initially sought a new partner, but in January 2023 he informed the German Ice Skating Union that he had not been able to find a suitable one, and that he would be retiring from competition. He announced that he would focus on coaching and his educational studies. Seegert currently works as a coach in Berlin. His students have included:

- (Poland) Ioulia Chtchetinina / Michał Woźniak
- (Germany) Annika Hocke / Robert Kunkel
- (Spain) Brooke McIntosh / Marco Zandron
- (Germany) Katalin Janne Salatzki / Lukas Roeseler

== Programs ==
=== With Hase ===
Season	Short program	Free skating	Exhibition
2021–2022	You Are the Reason by Calum Scott & Leona Lewis choreo. by Mark Pillay	People Help the People by Cherry Ghost performed by Birdy choreo. by Mark Pillay	Breathe Me performed by Jonathan Roy
2020–2021	Open Hands by Trent Dabbs performed by Ingrid Michaelson choreo. by Mark Pillay	People Help the People by Cherry Ghost performed by Birdy choreo. by Mark Pillay	
2019–2020	Open Hands by Trent Dabbs performed by Ingrid Michaelson choreo. by Mark Pillay	The House of the Rising Sun performed by Heavy Young Heathens choreo. by Mark Pillay	
2018–2019	Say Something by A Great Big World performed by Christina Aguilera choreo. by Mark Pillay	The House of the Rising Sun performed by Heavy Young Heathens choreo. by Mark Pillay	
2017–2018	Say Something by A Great Big World performed by Christina Aguilera choreo. by Mark Pillay	New World Coming by DiSa, Benjam Wallfisch	
2016–2017	Torn (High Strung Soundtrack) by Nathan Lanier choreo. by Mark Pillay	Eleanor Rigby by The Beatles performed by Joshua Bell, Frankie Moreno choreo. by Paul Boll	
2015–2016	Music by John Miles choreo. by Paul Boll	Dance of the Knights (from Romeo and Juliet) by Sergei Prokofiev; Romeo and Juliet by Nino Rota choreo. by Paul Boll	
2014–2015	Music by John Miles choreo. by Paul Boll	Beyond Silence by Niki Reiser choreo. by Paul Boll	

=== With Bauer ===
Season	Short program	Free skating
2012–2013	Shall We Dance? by John Altman	Somewhere in Time by John Barry

== Competitive highlights ==
GP: Grand Prix; CS: Challenger Series; JGP: Junior Grand Prix

=== Pair skating with Minerva Fabienne Hase ===
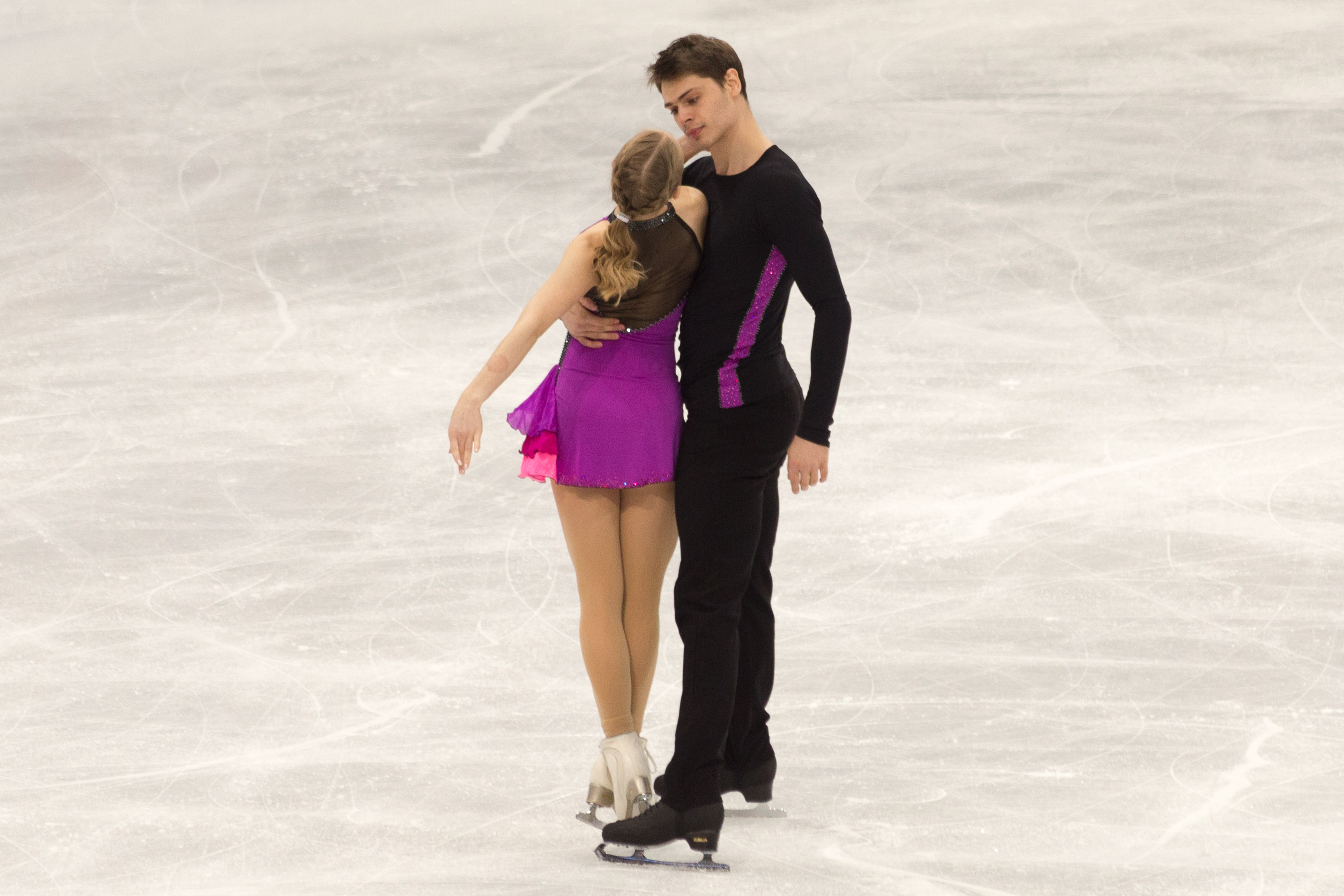
Hase and Seegert at the 2017 World Championships

Competition placements at senior level
Season	2014–15	2015–16	2016–17	2017–18	2018–19	2019–20	2020–21	2021–22
Winter Olympics								16th
World Championships			19th		13th	C		5th
European Championships	11th		12th		6th	5th		8th
German Championships	2nd	3rd	WD	2nd	1st	1st		1st
GP France					7th	7th		
GP NHK Trophy								7th
GP Rostelecom Cup						3rd		
GP Skate America					5th			
GP Skate Canada								5th
CS Finlandia Trophy			7th	8th				7th
CS Golden Spin of Zagreb					4th	3rd		
CS Ice Star				4th				
CS Nebelhorn Trophy		6th	6th		4th	5th	WD	1st
CS Tallinn Trophy		6th						
CS Warsaw Cup			3rd	3rd				
Bavarian Open		2nd						
Challenge Cup	3rd				1st			
Cup of Nice		4th						
Cup of Tyrol			3rd					
Mentor Cup	3rd		4th					
NRW Trophy	3rd	1st	1st				2nd	
Sarajevo Open		2nd						

=== Pairs with Bauer ===
International
Event	11–12	12–13	13–14
JGP Croatia		10th	
JGP Germany		9th	
Bavarian Open		3rd J	
Challenge Cup	3rd J		
NRW Trophy			5th J
Warsaw Cup			4th J
National
Germany		1st J	

=== Pairs with Salatzki ===
International
Event	09–10	10–11
JGP Germany	19th	12th
JGP United Kingdom		12th
NRW Trophy	4th J	
Toruń Cup	1st J	
National
Germany	2nd J	

=== Men's singles ===
Event	07–08	08–09	09–10
National
Germany	10th J	10th J	8th J

== Detailed results ==
Current personal best scores are highlighted in bold.

=== With Hase ===
**2021–2022 season**
Date	Event	SP	FS	Total
November 1–3, 2019	2022 World Championships	6; 66.29	5; **123.32**	5; **189.61**
February 18–19, 2021	2022 Winter Olympics	14; 62.37	16; 87.32	16; 149.69
January 10–16, 2022	2022 European Championships	5; 62.21	9; 106.54	8; 168.75
December 9–11, 2021	2022 German Championships	1; 68.94	1; 128.70	1; 197.64
November 12–14, 2021	2021 NHK Trophy	7; 54.63	7; 107.26	7; 161.89
October 29–31, 2021	2021 Skate Canada International	3; 67.93	5; 118.89	5; 186.82
October 7–10, 2021	2021 CS Finlandia Trophy	5; 65.19	6; 123.18	7; 188.37
September 22–25, 2021	2021 CS Nebelhorn Trophy	2; 66.26	2; 118.99	1; 185.25
**2020–2021 season**
Date	Event	SP	FS	Total
November 26–29, 2020	2020 NRW Trophy	1; 64.46	2; 91.49	2; 155.95
**2019–2020 season**
Date	Event	SP	FS	Total
January 20–26, 2020	2020 European Championships	5; **70.43**	5; 115.96	5; 186.39
January 1–3, 2020	2020 German Championships	1; 67.49	1; 124.42	1; 191.91
December 4–7, 2019	2019 CS Golden Spin of Zagreb	2; 68.30	3; 116.79	3; 185.09
November 15–17, 2019	2019 Rostelecom Cup	4; 67.74	4; 118.42	3; 186.16
November 1–3, 2019	2019 Internationaux de France	6; 59.13	7; 103.96	7; 163.09
September 25–29, 2019	2019 CS Nebelhorn Trophy	3; 67.99	6; 114.31	5; 182.30
**2018–19 season**
Date	Event	SP	FS	Total
March 18–24, 2019	2019 World Championships	10; 64.28	14; 109.76	13; 174.04
February 21–24, 2019	2019 International Challenge Cup	1; 67.56	2; 117.82	1; 185.38
January 21–27, 2019	2019 European Championships	6; 60.08	5; 120.48	6; 180.56
December 21–23, 2018	2019 German Championships	1; 66.86	2; 107.83	1; 174.69
December 5–8, 2018	2018 CS Golden Spin of Zagreb	4; 62.97	4; 109.21	4; 172.18
November 23–25, 2018	2018 Internationaux de France	7; 52.61	6; 102.16	7; 154.77
October 19–21, 2018	2018 Skate America	3; 60.04	5; 102.06	5; 162.10
September 26–29, 2018	2018 CS Nebelhorn Trophy	2; 58.27	6; 103.34	4; 161.61
**2017–18 season**
Date	Event	SP	FS	Total
December 14–16, 2017	2018 German Championships	2; 59.58	2; 109.41	2; 168.99
November 16–19, 2017	2017 CS Warsaw Cup	2; 59.92	3; 107.80	3; 167.72
October 26–29, 2017	2017 CS Ice Star	3; 55.38	4; 97.78	4; 153.16
October 6–8, 2017	2017 CS Finlandia Trophy	8; 45.67	8; 89.71	8; 135.38
**2016–17 season**
Date	Event	SP	FS	Total
March 29–April 2, 2017	2017 World Championships	19; 59.76	–	19; 59.76
February 28–March 5, 2017	2017 Mentor Toruń Cup	3; 58.30	3; 100.40	3; 158.70
January 25–29, 2017	2017 European Championships	13; 51.27	12; 96.13	12; 147.40
January 10–15, 2017	2017 Mentor Toruń Cup	4; 48.62	4; 89.47	4; 138.09
November 30–December 4, 2016	2016 NRW Trophy	2; 49.81	1; 87.22	1; 137.03
November 17–20, 2016	2016 CS Warsaw Cup	3; 49.12	2; 92.50	3; 141.62
October 6–10, 2016	2016 CS Finlandia Trophy	7; 50.28	8; 77.27	7; 127.55
September 22–24, 2016	2016 CS Nebelhorn Trophy	6; 44.00	6; 91.54	6; 135.54
**2015–16 season**
Date	Event	SP	FS	Total
February 17–21, 2016	2016 Bavarian Open	2; 52.06	3; 88.28	2; 140.34
February 4–6, 2016	2016 Sarajevo Open	2; 45.36	2; 86.06	2; 131.42
December 11–13, 2015	2016 German Championships	3; 54.52	3; 89.02	3; 143.54
November 24–29, 2015	2015 NRW Trophy	1; 43.10	1; 72.77	1; 115.87
November 18–22, 2015	2015 CS Tallinn Trophy	4; 50.76	7; 87.46	6; 138.22
October 14–18, 2015	2015 International Cup of Nice	4; 42.78	4; 75.84	4; 118.62
September 24–26, 2015	2015 CS Nebelhorn Trophy	6; 50.29	6; 79.77	6; 130.06
**2014–15 season**
Date	Event	SP	FS	Total
February 19–22, 2015	2015 International Challenge Cup	3; 44.83	3; 82.87	3; 127.70
January 26–February 1, 2015	2015 European Championships	11; 42.13	10; 79.16	11; 121.29
January 7–10, 2015	2014 Mentor Toruń Cup	3; 42.41	3; 78.93	3; 121.34
December 11–13, 2014	2015 German Championships	2; 38.61	2; 79.80	2; 118.41
November 26–30, 2014	2014 NRW Trophy	3; 38.80	3; 63.44	3; 102.24
