= Epica (Audiomachine album) =

Studio album by Audiomachine
- Released: September 7, 2011 (production album); July 10, 2012 (commercial release)
- Length: 43:40
- Producer: Paul Dinletir

Audiomachine chronology
Chronicles (2012)	Epica (2011)	Helios (2012)

Epica is an album by American group Audiomachine, released on 10 July 2012. The album peaked at number five on the Billboard Top Classical Albums chart.

== Track listing ==
No.	Title	Length
1.	"Prologue – Birth"	4:44
2.	"Fire and Honor"	3:15
3.	"Nameless Heroes"	3:52
4.	"Transcendence"	3:43
5.	"Young Blood"	4:15
6.	"Knights and Lords"	2:33
7.	"The New Earth"	3:09
8.	"Flames of War"	2:54
9.	"Maya"	2:55
10.	"Epica"	4:41
11.	"Tribes"	3:29
12.	"Eternal Flame"	4:10

== Charts ==
Chart	Peak position
Top Classical Albums (Billboard)	5
