= 2019 German Figure Skating Championships =

- Type: National Championship
- Date: December 21 – 23, 2018
- Season: 2018–19
- Location: Stuttgart
- Venue: Eissporthalle Stuttgart
- Previous: 2018 German Championships
- Next: 2020 German Championships

The 2019 German Figure Skating Championships (German: Deutsche Meisterschaften im Eiskunstlaufen 2019) was held on December 21–23, 2018 at the Eissporthalle Stuttgart in Stuttgart. Skaters competed in the disciplines of men's singles, women's singles, pair skating, and ice dance on the senior, junior, and novice levels. The results of the national championships were among the criteria used to choose the German teams to the 2019 World Championships and 2019 European Championships.

== Medalists ==
=== Senior ===
Discipline	Gold	Silver	Bronze
Men	Paul Fentz	Thomas Stoll	Catalin Dimitrescu
Ladies	Nicole Schott	Nathalie Weinzierl	Ann-Christin Marold
Pairs	Minerva Fabienne Hase / Nolan Seegert	Annika Hocke / Ruben Blommaert	No other competitors
Ice dance	Shari Koch / Christian Nüchtern	Katharina Müller / Tim Dieck	Jennifer Urban / Benjamin Steffan

== Senior results ==
=== Men's singles ===
Rank	Name	Total points	SP		FS	
1	Paul Fentz	211.49	1	76.41	1	135.08
2	Thomas Stoll	180.84	2	61.22	2	119.62
3	Catalin Dimitrescu	165.01	3	56.94	3	108.07
4	Fabian Piontek	147.22	4	48.34	4	98.88

=== Women's singles ===
Rank	Name	Total points	SP		FS	
1	Nicole Schott	167.67	1	62.59	1	105.08
2	Nathalie Weinzierl	155.91	2	60.38	3	95.53
3	Ann-Christin Marold	143.71	5	42.70	2	101.01
4	Alissa Scheidt	143.14	3	52.74	4	90.40
5	Kristina Isaev	138.90	4	50.24	5	88.66
6	Jasmin Lugert	101.74	6	36.39	6	65.35
7	Celine Göbel	95.96	7	36.14	7	59.82

=== Pair skating ===
Rank	Name	Total points	SP		FS	
1	Minerva Fabienne Hase / Nolan Seegert	174.69	1	66.86	2	107.83
2	Annika Hocke / Ruben Blommaert	169.37	2	57.03	1	112.34

=== Ice dance ===
Rank	Name	Total points	RD		FD	
1	Shari Koch / Christian Nüchtern	181.72	1	71.14	1	110.58
2	Katharina Müller / Tim Dieck	176.40	2	70.21	3	106.19
3	Jennifer Urban / Benjamin Steffan	176.35	3	66.55	2	109.80
