= Minerva Fabienne Hase =

German pair skater (born 1999)

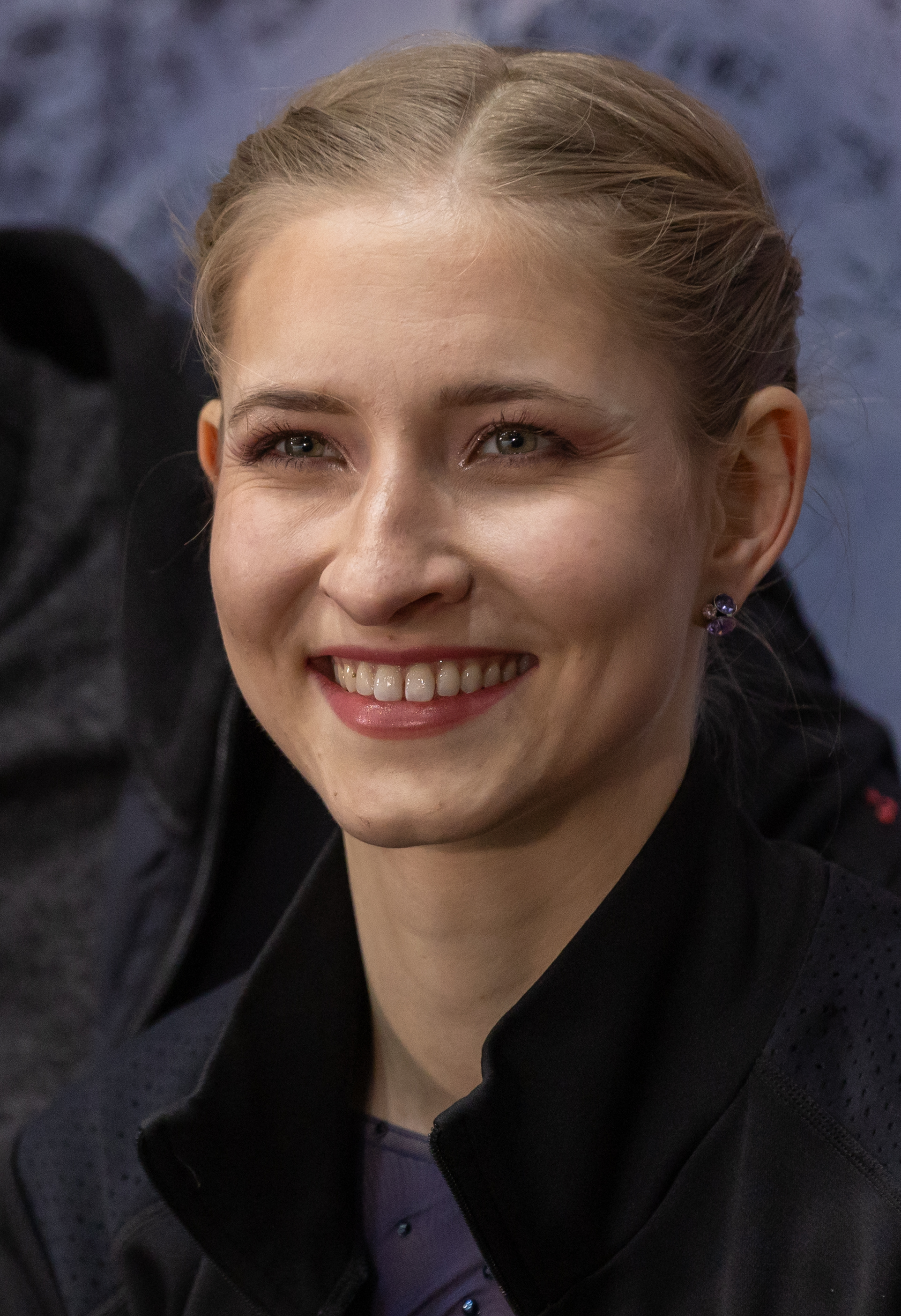
- Minerva Fabienne Hase in 2025

Personal information
- Other names: Minnie
- Born: 10 June 1999 (age 27) Berlin, Germany
- Home town: Berlin, Germany
- Height: 1.67 m (5 ft 6 in)

Figure skating career
- Country: Germany
- Discipline: Pair skating
- Partner: Nikita Volodin (since 2022); Nolan Seegert (2014–22)
- Coach: Dmitri Savin; Knut Schubert; Sidnei Brandão; Rico Rex
- Skating club: BSV 92 Berlin
- Began skating: 2004
- Highest WS: 1st (2025–26)

Medal record
Event	Gold medal – first place	Silver medal – second place	Bronze medal – third place
Olympic Games	0	0	1
World Championships	1	1	1
European Championships	1	1	0
Grand Prix Final	2	0	1
German Championships	5	2	1
Medal list
Olympic Games
Bronze medal – third place	2026 Milano Cortina	Pairs
World Championships
Gold medal – first place	2026 Prague	Pairs
Silver medal – second place	2025 Boston	Pairs
Bronze medal – third place	2024 Montreal	Pairs
European Championships
Gold medal – first place	2025 Tallinn	Pairs
Silver medal – second place	2026 Sheffield	Pairs
Grand Prix Final
Gold medal – first place	2023–24 Beijing	Pairs
Gold medal – first place	2024–25 Grenoble	Pairs
Bronze medal – third place	2025–26 Nagoya	Pairs
German Championships
Gold medal – first place	2019 Stuttgart	Pairs
Gold medal – first place	2020 Oberstdorf	Pairs
Gold medal – first place	2022 Neuss	Pairs
Gold medal – first place	2024 Berlin	Pairs
Gold medal – first place	2025 Oberstdorf	Pairs
Silver medal – second place	2015 Stuttgart	Pairs
Silver medal – second place	2018 Frankfurt	Pairs
Bronze medal – third place	2016 Essen	Pairs

Minerva Fabienne Hase (born 10 June 1999) is a German pair skater. With her current partner, Nikita Volodin, she is the 2026 Winter Olympic bronze medalist, 2026 World gold medalist, 2025 World silver medalist, the 2024 World bronze medalist, the 2025 European champion, a two-time Grand Prix Final champion (2023–24, 2024–25), a seven-time ISU Grand Prix medalist, a five-time ISU Challenger Series medalist, and a three-time German national champion (2023–25).

Hase previously partnered with Nolan Seegert, with whom she was the 2019 Rostelecom Cup bronze medalist, 2021 CS Nebelhorn Trophy champion, and three-time German national champion (2019–20, 2022). The pair represented Germany at the 2022 Winter Olympics.

== Personal life ==
Hase was born on 10 June 1999 in Berlin. She studied at the Schul- und Leistungssportzentrum in Berlin.

Since 2019, Hase has been in a relationship with German basketball player, Jonas Mattisseck, who attended the same high school as her.

== Career ==
=== Single skating ===
Hase began learning to skate in 2004. She skated internationally in the novice ranks until 2013. In January 2016, she finished fifth in the junior ladies' category at the German Youth Championships.

=== Partnership with Nolan Seegert ===
==== 2014–2015 season: First season in pairs ====
Hase teamed up with Nolan Seegert in 2014. The pair's international debut came in late November, at the 2014 NRW Trophy, where they took the bronze medal. In January 2015, they took bronze at the Toruń Cup before competing at the 2015 European Championships in Stockholm, Sweden; they placed eleventh in the short program, tenth in the free skate, and eleventh overall. They concluded their first season with a bronze at the International Challenge Cup.

==== 2015–2016 season ====
Making their ISU Challenger Series debut, Hase/Seegert placed 6th at the 2015 CS Nebelhorn Trophy. They then won gold at the 2015 NRW Trophy and finished sixth at the 2015 CS Tallinn Trophy. They received silver at the 2016 Sarajevo Open and at the 2016 Bavarian Open.

==== 2016–2017 season: World Championships debut ====
In November, Hase/Seegert won gold at the 2016 NRW Trophy and bronze at the 2016 CS Warsaw Cup. The following month, they competed at the German Championships but withdrew following the short program due to an injury to Hase.

In January, Hase/Seegert skated at the 2017 Toruń Cup, placing fourth, and then at the 2017 European Championships in Ostrava; they finished twelfth overall in the Czech Republic after placing thirteenth in the short program and twelfth in the free skate. In March, the pair took bronze at the 2017 Cup of Tyrol before competing at the 2017 World Championships in Helsinki, Finland. They achieved a personal best short program score, of 59.76 points, but their ranking (nineteenth) was insufficient to advance to the final segment.

==== 2017–2018 season ====
In October, Hase/Seegert finished eighth at the 2017 CS Finlandia Trophy and fourth at the 2017 CS Minsk-Arena Ice Star. They outscored Annika Hocke / Ruben Blommaert by 5.77 points for the bronze medal at the 2017 CS Warsaw Cup in November. The following month, the pair won silver behind Aliona Savchenko / Bruno Massot at the German Championships, ranking second in both segments and obtaining 4.33 points more than Hocke/Blommaert. Hase/Seegert were not included in Germany's team to the 2018 Winter Olympics, having finished third overall in the national qualification standings.

Due to a back injury sustained by Hase, the pair was unable to accept a spot at the 2018 European Championships, which became available after Savchenko/Massot withdrew.

==== 2018–2019 season: First national title ====
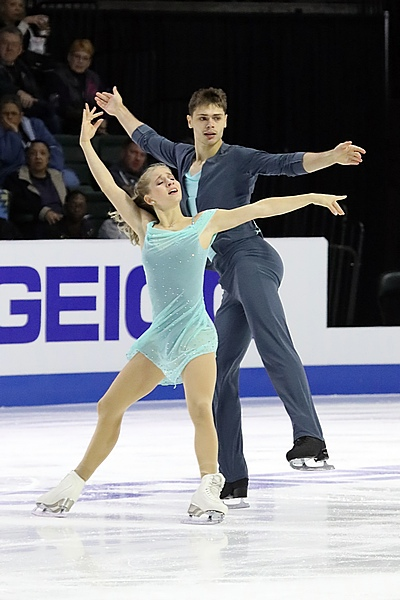
Hase/Seegert at the 2018 Skate America

Hase/Seegert started the new competition season at the 2018 CS Nebelhorn Trophy and finished fourth. The pair received their first Grand Prix invitations. They placed fifth at the 2018 Skate America and seventh at the 2018 Internationaux de France. After participating at the 2018 Golden Spin of Zagreb and placing fourth, they won their first national title at the 2019 German Championships.

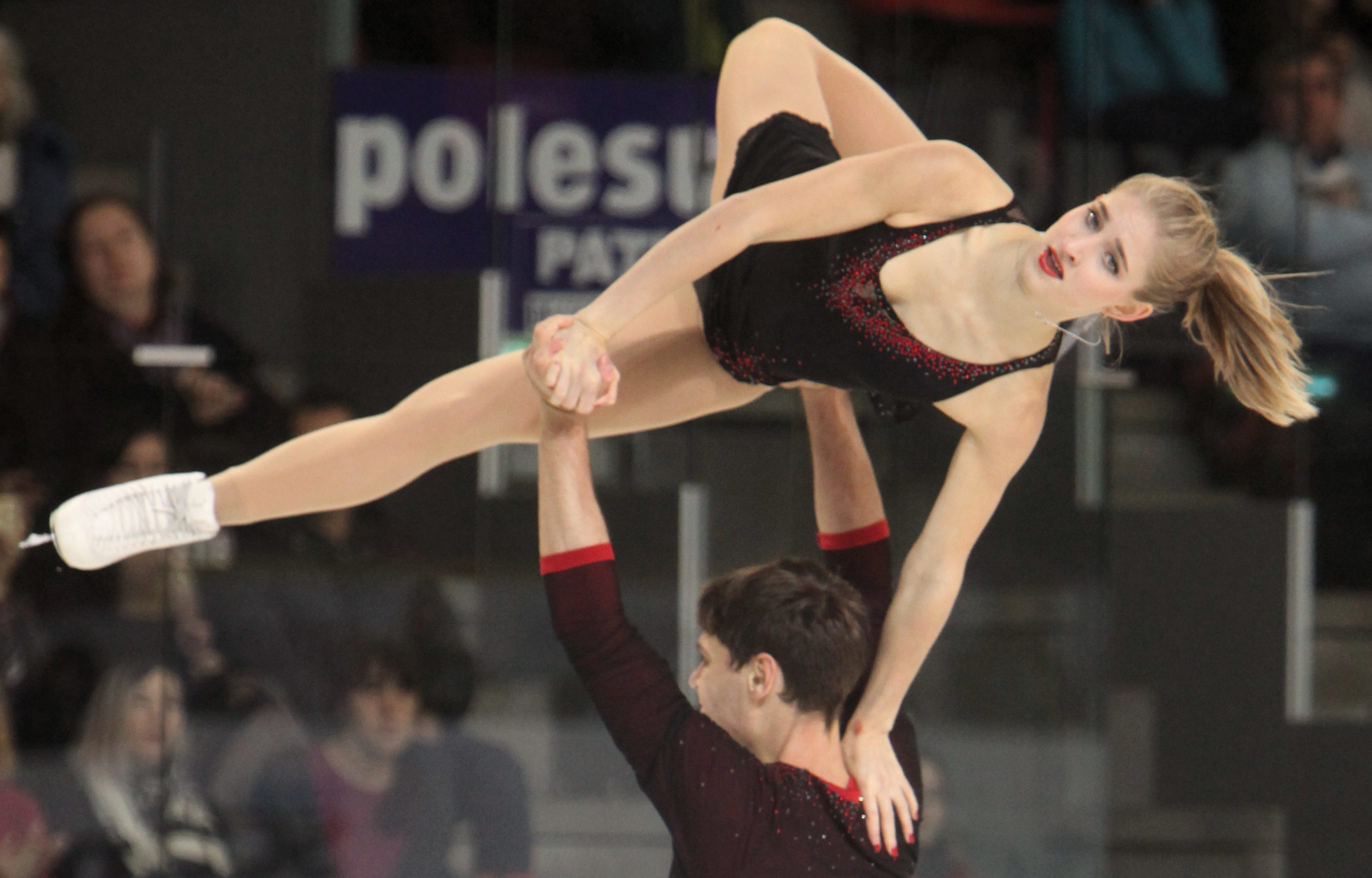
Hase/Seegert performing a lift at the 2018 Internationaux de France

Hase/Seegert took sixth place at the 2019 European Championships, and at the 2019 Challenge Cup they won gold at their first international competition with a new best total score of 185.38 points. Hase/Seegert and Hocke/Blommaert were assigned to Germany's two berths at the 2019 World Championships in Saitama. In the short program Hase/Seegert started with a personal best of 64.28 points in the competition and took tenth place. However, an aborted lift towards the end of the free program put them in fourteenth place in that segment (109.76 points); overall, they reached thirteenth place.

==== 2019–2020 season: Grand Prix bronze ====
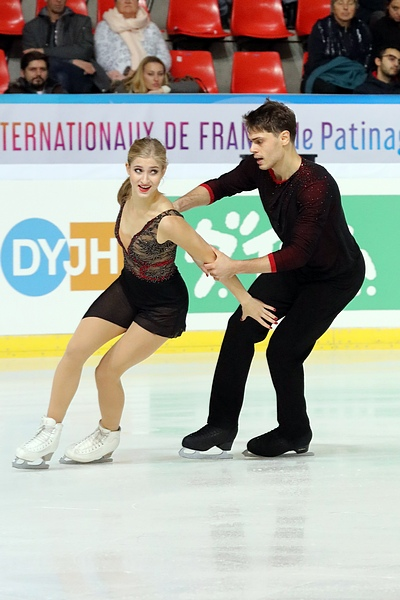
Hase/Seegert at the 2019 Internationaux de France

After the pair Hocke/Blommaert announced the end of their common career in April 2019, Hase/Seegert were the only German pair to receive two starting places from the International Skating Union for the 2019–20 Grand Prix season. They placed fifth at the 2019 CS Nebelhorn Trophy, setting new personal bests in the short program and in total score, before placing seventh at the 2019 Internationaux de France. At their second Grand Prix assignment, the 2019 Rostelecom Cup, Hase/Seegert placed fourth in the short program, narrowly behind the new Russian pair of Stolbova/Novoselov. In the free skate, Stolbova/Novoselov performed poorly, while Hase/Seegert nearly equaled their personal best in the segment, placing fourth again, but third overall due to their short program lead over the Austrian team Ziegler/Kiefer. The bronze medal was their first Grand Prix medal, which Seegert called "our biggest moment so far in our career."

After winning the German title for the second consecutive year, Hase/Seegert were assigned to the 2020 European Championships, where they placed fifth in the short program with a new personal best, breaking 70 points in that segment for the first time. Fifth in the free skate as well, they were fifth overall, despite a number of errors that led Hase to deem it "not a good program." This proved to be their final competition for the season, as they had been assigned to compete at the World Championships in Montreal, but these were cancelled as a result of the coronavirus pandemic.

==== 2020–2021 season: Injury struggles ====
With the pandemic continuing to affect events, Hase/Seegert made their season debut at the 2020 CS Nebelhorn Trophy, which, due to its being attended only by European pairs, made them the pre-event favourites. They were ranked first after the short program but withdrew before the free skate due to a practice injury.

Hase/Seegert were scheduled to compete in the Grand Prix at the 2020 Internationaux de France, but the event was cancelled due to the pandemic. They were assigned to compete at the 2021 World Championships in Stockholm, but after Hase injured her leg in training, they had to withdraw.

==== 2021–2022 season: Beijing Olympics ====
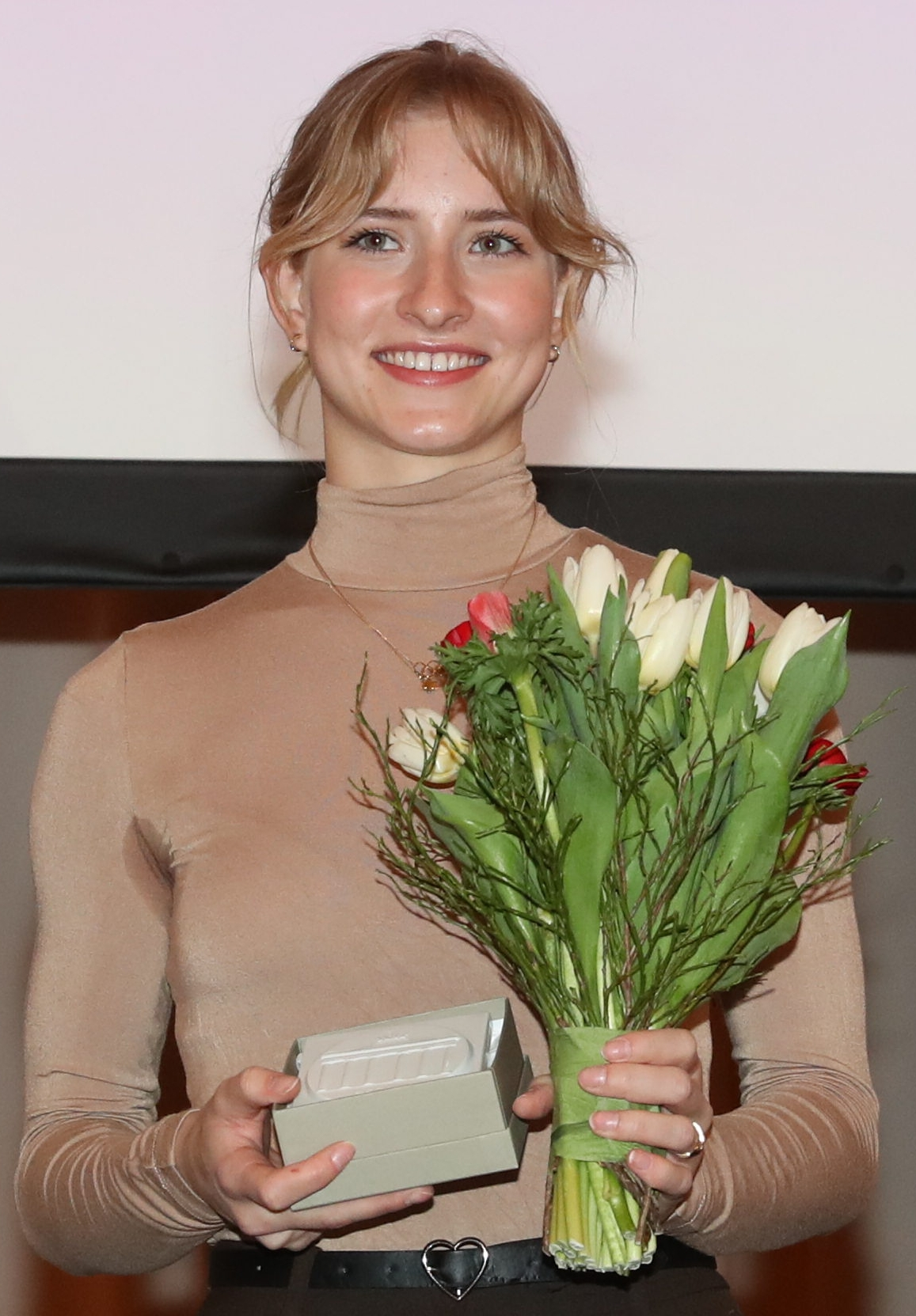
Hase at the 2022 Winter Olympics

Recovery from ligament surgery left Hase off the ice for months. They began training in Sochi with new coach Dmitri Savin.

Hase/Seegert began the season at the 2021 CS Nebelhorn Trophy, where they placed second in the short program 0.20 points behind Georgians Safina/Berulava. They were second in the free skate as well, behind Spaniards Barquero/Zandron, but first overall, taking their first Challenger gold. Hase commented on her return to the ice, saying "we did not come here to win, we just were happy to be able to skate again." At their second Challenger event of the season, the 2021 CS Finlandia Trophy, they placed seventh.

At their first Grand Prix assignment, the 2021 Skate Canada International, Hase/Seegert, were third in the short program with a clean skate. A number of imperfect elements in the free skate, particularly Hase's struggles on the throw jumps, dropped them to fifth overall. Hase said afterward "I felt a little bit shaky at the beginning; I was tired. We can still be proud of the program." They were seventh of seven teams at the 2021 NHK Trophy after several errors in both programs. Speaking after the free, Hase said it was "a tough skate for us, mentally and physical. We are not used to skating bad short programs, so it was mentally tough."

After winning their third German national title, Hase/Seegert competed at the 2022 European Championships in Tallinn, finishing eighth.

Hase/Seegert were named as the lone pairs entries for the German Olympic team. However, shortly after arriving in Beijing, Seegert tested positive for COVID-19 and was required to isolate. As a result, they were unable to participate in the Olympic team event, though it remained possible that they would be cleared for the pairs event two weeks later. On February 11, the German Ice Skating Union announced that Seegert had been released from quarantine and would be able to compete. They placed fourteenth in the short program after Hase fell on her jump attempt, qualifying for the free skate. However, due to lack of training time for Seegert during his quarantine, they had a "disastrous" free skate including two aborted lift attempts, finishing last in the free skate and dropping to sixteenth overall. Hase called it "just pure fighting."

Further difficulties awaited the pair immediately after the Olympics, as due to Vladimir Putin's invasion of Ukraine and resulting tensions between Russia and Germany, they were not allowed to return to Russia to train. The International Skating Union banned all Russian and Belarusian skaters from competing at the 2022 World Championships. As well, the Chinese Skating Association opted not to send athletes to compete in Montpellier. As those countries' athletes comprised the entirety of the top five pairs at the Olympics, this greatly impacted the field. Hase/Seegert were sixth in the short program with a clean skate, with Hase calling it "a program one can end the season with. The audience was very supportive." In the free skate, Seegert put his foot down on a jump and Hase stepped out of a throw, but their 123.32 score was narrowly a new personal best, and they finished fifth overall with another new personal best.

Hase and Seegert's partnership came to an end following the Olympic season. In 2025, Hase shared that the main reason behind their partnership dissolving was because Seegert had only wished to compete for one more season while she wished to continue competing for another Olympic cycle.

=== Partnership with Nikita Volodin ===
In June 2022, Hase was introduced to Russian pair skater, Nikita Volodin, by Dmitri Savin. Agreeing to skate together and represent her country, they trained through the 2022–23 season while waiting for Volodin to be released by the Figure Skating Federation of Russia. Initially, the pair were unable to communicate due to Volodin being unable to speak German nor English at the time. Savin would thus act as the team's translator until Volodin learned to speak English well enough to interact with Hase.

Volodin was released by the Russian federation in May 2022. It was subsequently announced that the pair would train in Berlin under coaches, Rico Rex and Knut Schubert, due to Hase being unable to travel to Russia with the country's ongoing political situation resulted from its invasion of Ukraine. In addition, Savin would continue working with the pair by acting as their coach at international competitions.

==== 2023–24 season: World bronze and Grand Prix Final champions ====
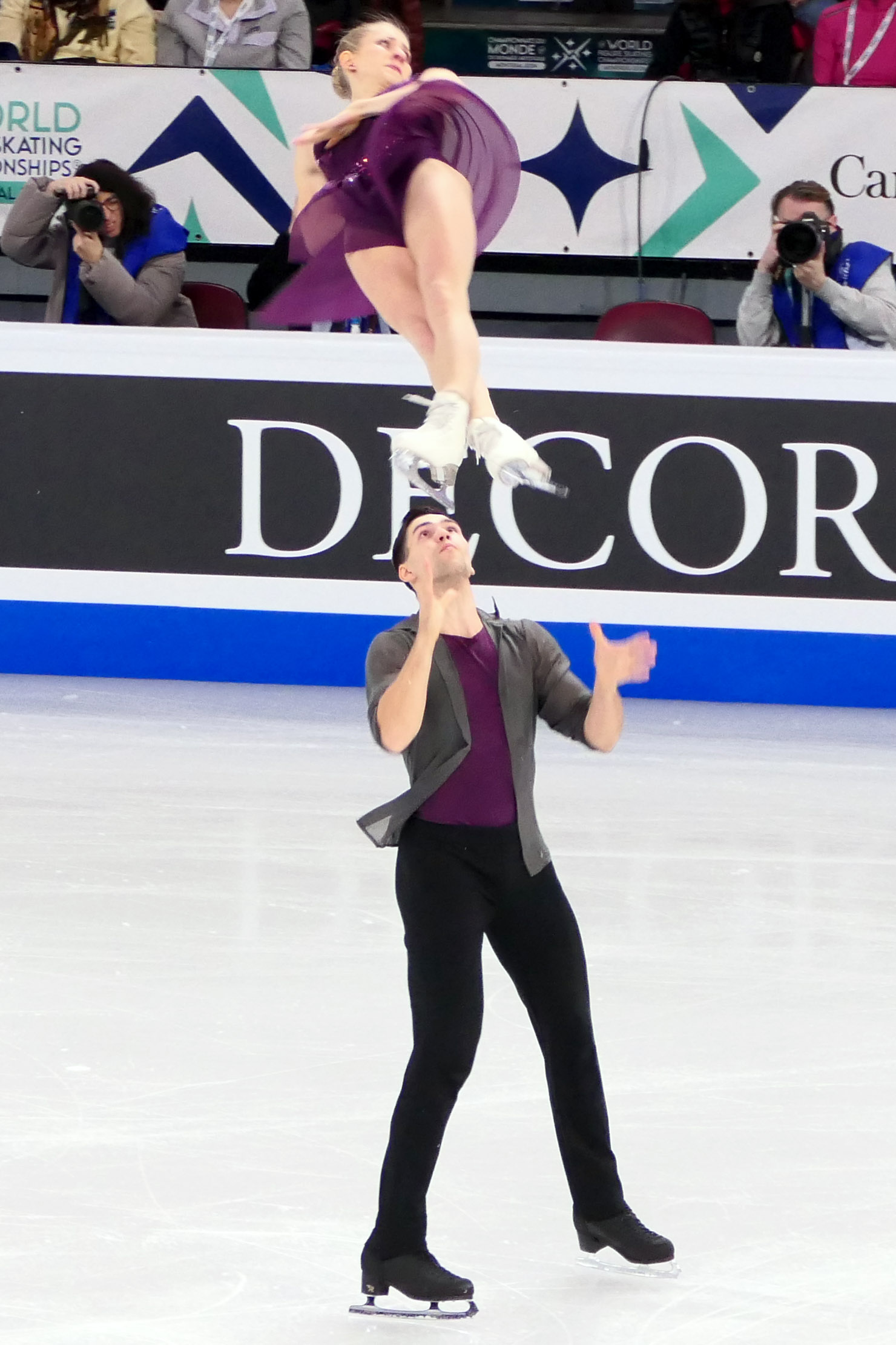
Hase/Volodin performing a split triple twist during their short program at the 2024 World Championships

Hase/Volodin debuted as a team at the 2023 CS Lombardia Trophy, where they won the silver medal behind reigning Italian European champions Conti/Macii, and finishing ahead of domestic rivals Hocke/Kunkel. Hase said it felt "so good to be back and even be on the podium in our first competition." They went on to win a Challenger gold medal on home soil at the 2023 CS Nebelhorn Trophy, after coming back from placing third in the short program.

Hase/Volodin made their senior Grand Prix debut at the 2023 Grand Prix of Espoo. They placed third in the short program behind Shanghai Trophy champions Peng/Wang and Conti/Macii after an error on their throw triple loop, but won the free skate despite jump errors and rose to take the gold medal. Hase admitted that the result felt "very lucky," but that it was "a special moment for both of us." They went on to win the 2023 NHK Trophy as well, improving on all their personal bests in the process and qualifying to the Grand Prix Final as the second seed.

Volodin having become ill following the NHK Trophy, the team was uncertain of their ability to compete. Returning to China for the Final, held in Beijing, they performed their first full run-through since the NHK Trophy in training. Hase/Volodin set a new personal best score to win the short program narrowly over Canadians Stellato-Dudek/Deschamps and Italians Conti/Macii. They finished second in the free skate behind Conti/Macii, but won the gold medal by 0.55 points over the Italian team. Hase said they were "overwhelmed." The following week they won their first German national title.

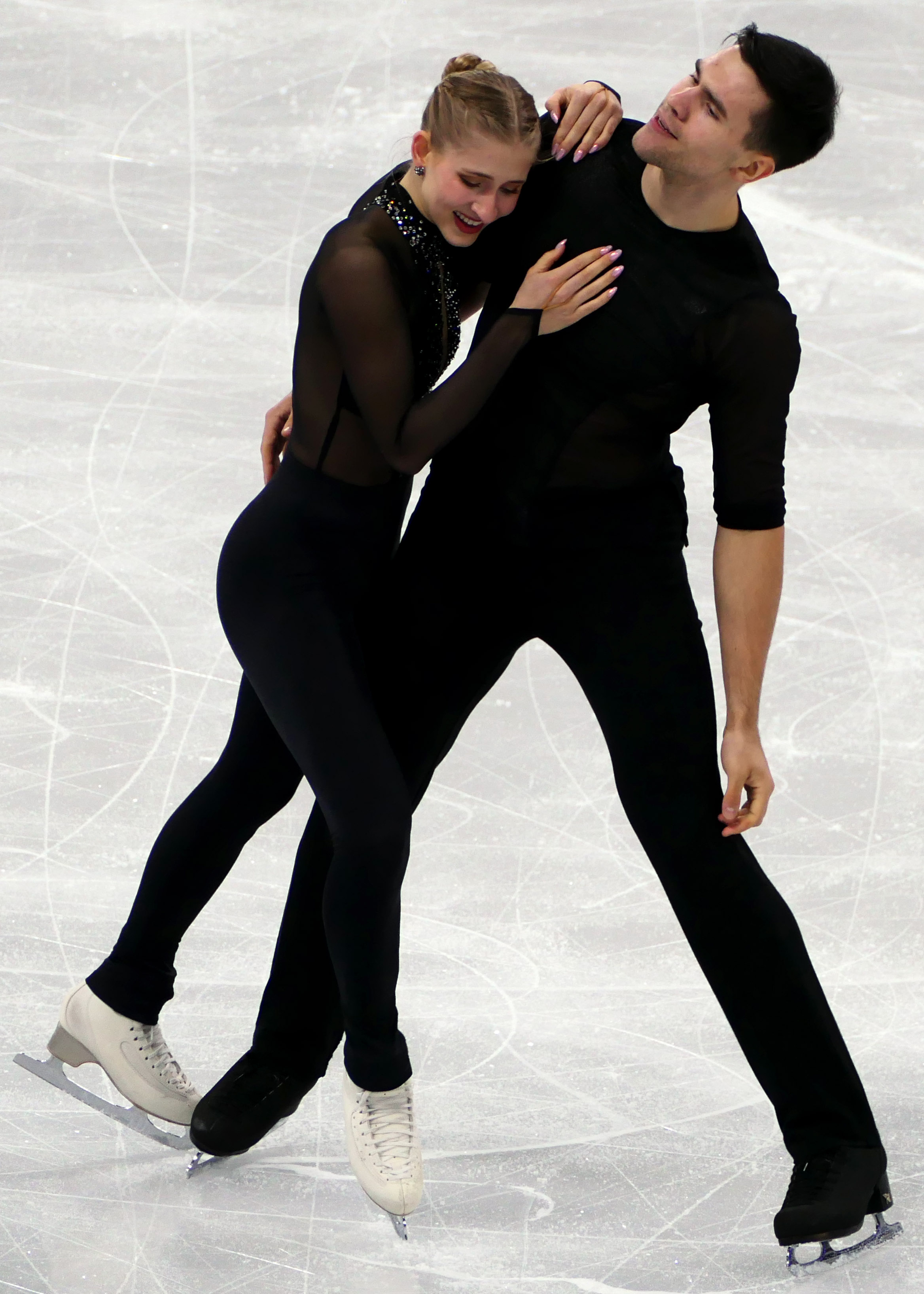
Hase/Volodin during their free skate at the 2024 World Championships

Hase became ill following the German Championships, as a result of which the team had only ten days of training prior to the 2024 European Championships in Kaunas. They entered as perceived favourites, finishing second in the short program. They had an error-riddled free skate, culminating in an aborted lift, that saw them place sixth in the segment and drop to fifth place overall. This was the team's first time missing the podium in competition. Hase said that they "have to appreciate what we have already achieved this season," and vowed that they would get used to the pressure of being the favourites.

Following the disappointment at the European Championships, Hase/Volodin performed in the Art on Ice skating show, which they would later credit with aiding them with performing in front of large audiences. At the 2024 World Championships, they placed fourth in the short program, 0.78 points behind Conti/Macii in third place. Despite Hase making a Salchow error in the free skate, they came third in that segment, and rose to third overall to claim the bronze medal. This was the first World medal for both, and the first for a German skater since Savchenko/Massot's gold medal in 2018. Hase said that "to be able to reward yourself for all these years with a medal at such a big world championship is of course something very special."

==== 2024–25 season: World silver, European champions, and Grand Prix Final champions ====
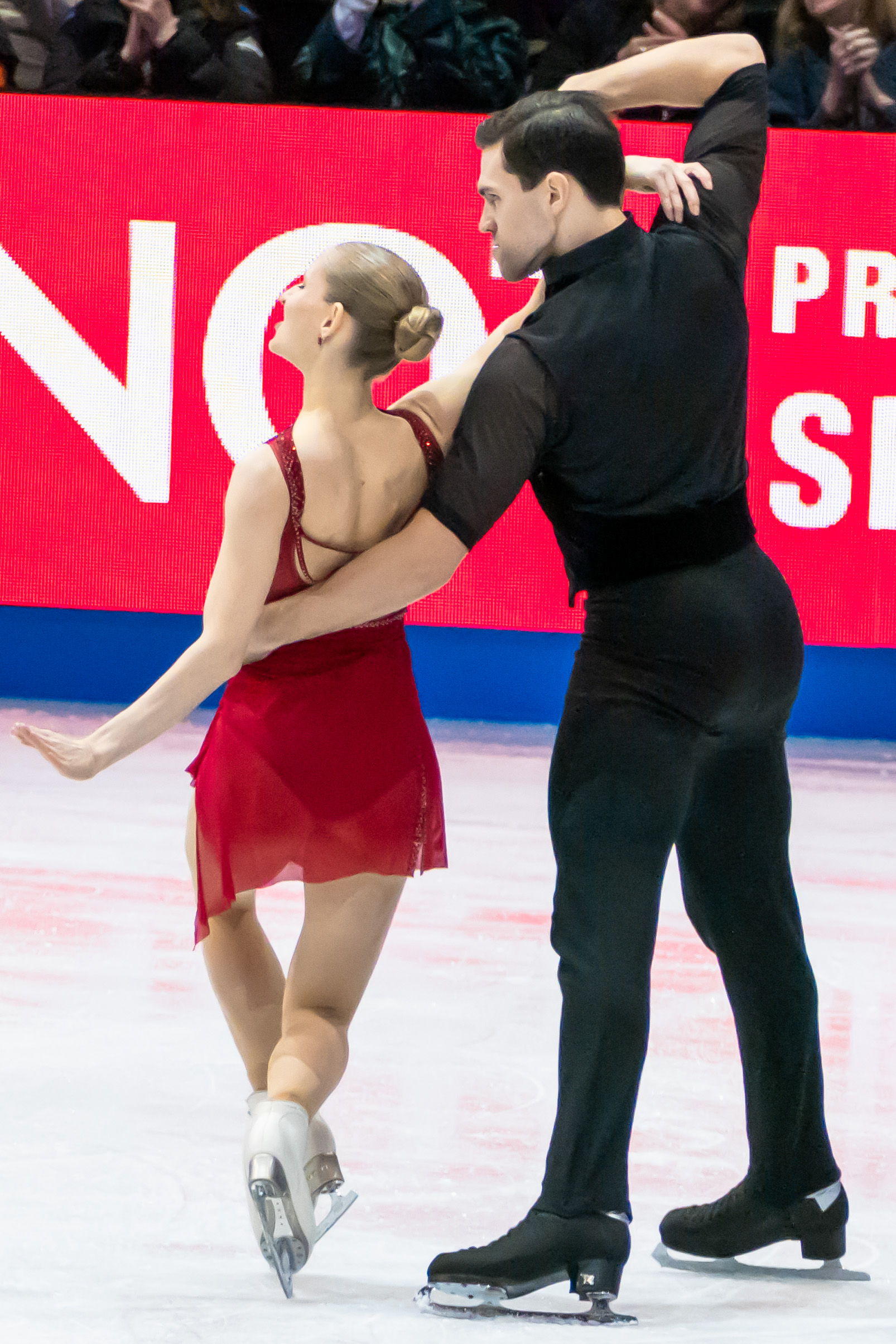
Hase and Volodin during the short program at the 2025 World Championships

Hase/Volodin started the season by winning gold at the 2024 CS Nebelhorn Trophy, defeating reigning World Champions, Stellato-Dudek/Deschamps, and scoring personal bests in all competition segments. They went on to compete at the 2024 Trophée Métropole Nice Côte d'Azur, however after completing the short program segment, the senior pairs free skate event was cancelled due to poor weather conditions. Hase/Volodin were awarded the gold medal based on their short program result.

Going on to compete on the 2024–25 Grand Prix circuit, the team won the gold medal at the 2024 Grand Prix de France. Following the event, Hase shared, "We came here knowing it was possible to win. We are glad we could show a good performance again and proved that Nebelhorn Trophy was not a one-hit-wonder. We are glad we could show consistency and the win is of course very nice." Volodin added, "We try not to think too much about the fact that we won the bronze at Worlds last season, this is a new fresh season." Three weeks later, prior to the pairs short program at the 2024 Cup of China, Hase would suffer with food poisoning. Despite this, the pair would go on to complete their short program, finishing second in that segment behind Conti/Macii due to Volodin taking an unexpected fall during the step sequence. The following day, Hase/Volodin would put forth a strong free skate performance, winning that segment of the competition. Hase/Volodin would finish second overall to Conti/Macii. Following the event, Hase said, "We are relieved, really just relieved. This was a hard work, like this program was hard work from beginning to the end. So, I'm really happy with what we did today. I'm just dead. I'm happy it's done now, that I can like chill now a little bit."

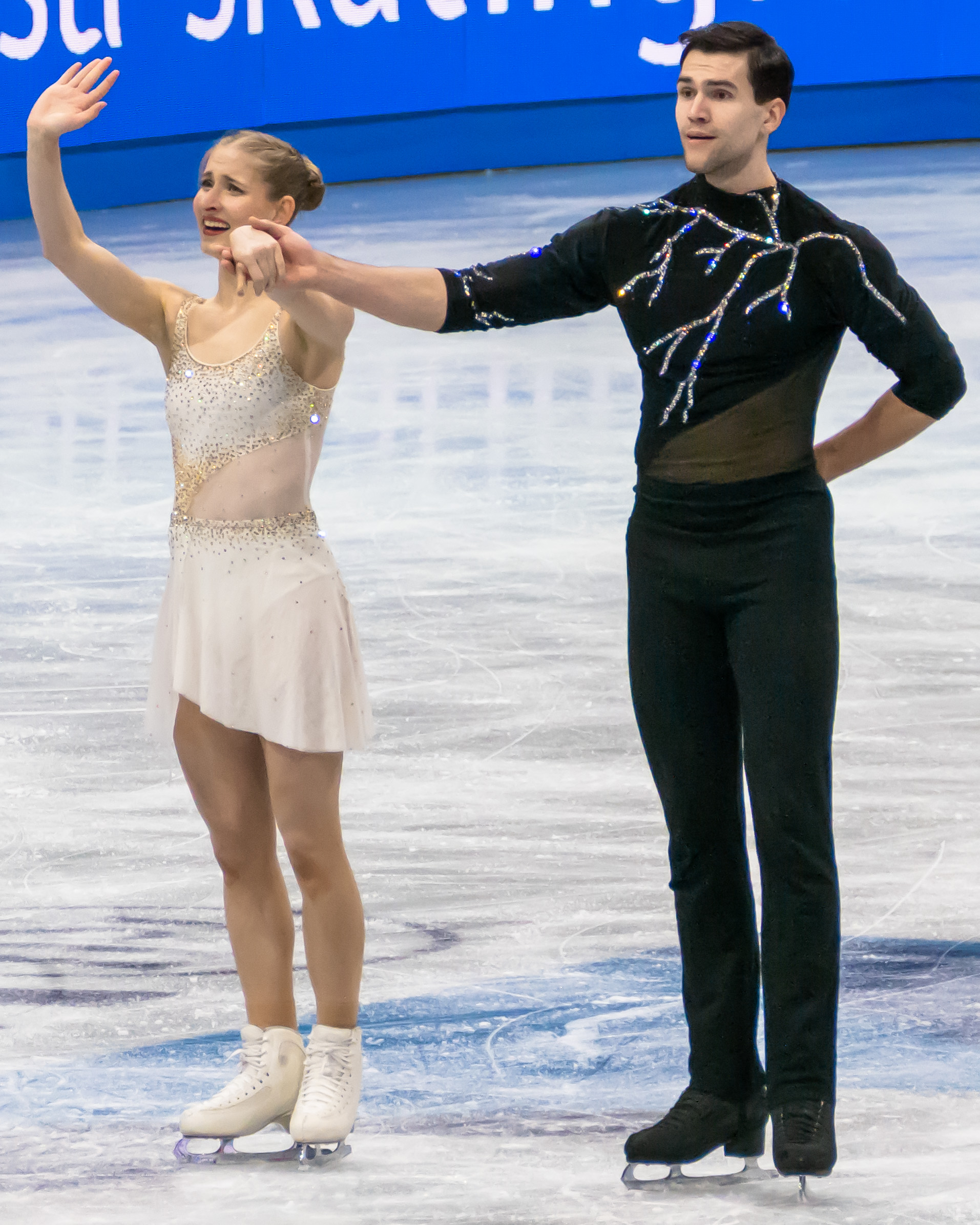
Hase and Volodin after their free skate at the 2025 World Championships

Qualifying for the 2024–25 Grand Prix Final, Hase/Volodin delivered to solid performances in an event that was otherwise riddled with costly errors by the other pair teams, allowing them to win the event for a second consecutive time and by almost twelve points. Following this win, Hase said, "We are incredibly happy. Winning this year was much more difficult than last year. Last year there were no expectations but this year we felt much more pressure." Two weeks later, Hase/Volodin won their second national title at the 2025 German Championships.

Going on to compete at the 2025 European Championships in Tallinn, Estonia, Hase/Volodin skated two clean programs, winning both the short and free program segments, and winning the gold medal overall. Following the event, Hase shared, "It feels incredible to be European champion. The moment we realized it was actually just when the scores came up because we saw that Sara and Niccolo also celebrated after their skate, so we knew that they had had a good skate. We weren’t sure until the last moment that it had been enough. We knew there was still a chance even after this mistake, but we weren’t sure until the very end. This victory shows that all of our hard work paid off—every sweat drop, every training session was worth it, and it’s an incredible feeling."

The following month, Hase/Volodin competed at the 2025 World Championships in Boston, Massachusetts, United States. After placing third in the short program, they managed to deliver a personal best free skate performance despite losing a level on their final lift. Despite winning the latter segment of the competition, Miura/Kihara's lead following the short program was enough for them to remain in first place overall, resulting in Hase/Volodin winning the silver medal. In an interview following their free skate, Hase shared, "It was an amazing feeling. I was so zoned out. I was so anxious to go out and then to put out a skate like this, I don’t have words for that. For one second we hoped it would be enough (to win) but we did everything in this free skate and we cannot be ashamed or regret that we held back. We did our maximum in the program. It was a little bit sad not to win the gold so closely. We are so happy with the skate. And next season, I hope we will make it. We are very happy with our season."

==== 2025–26 season: Milano Cortina Olympic bronze, World champions, European silver, and Grand Prix Final bronze ====
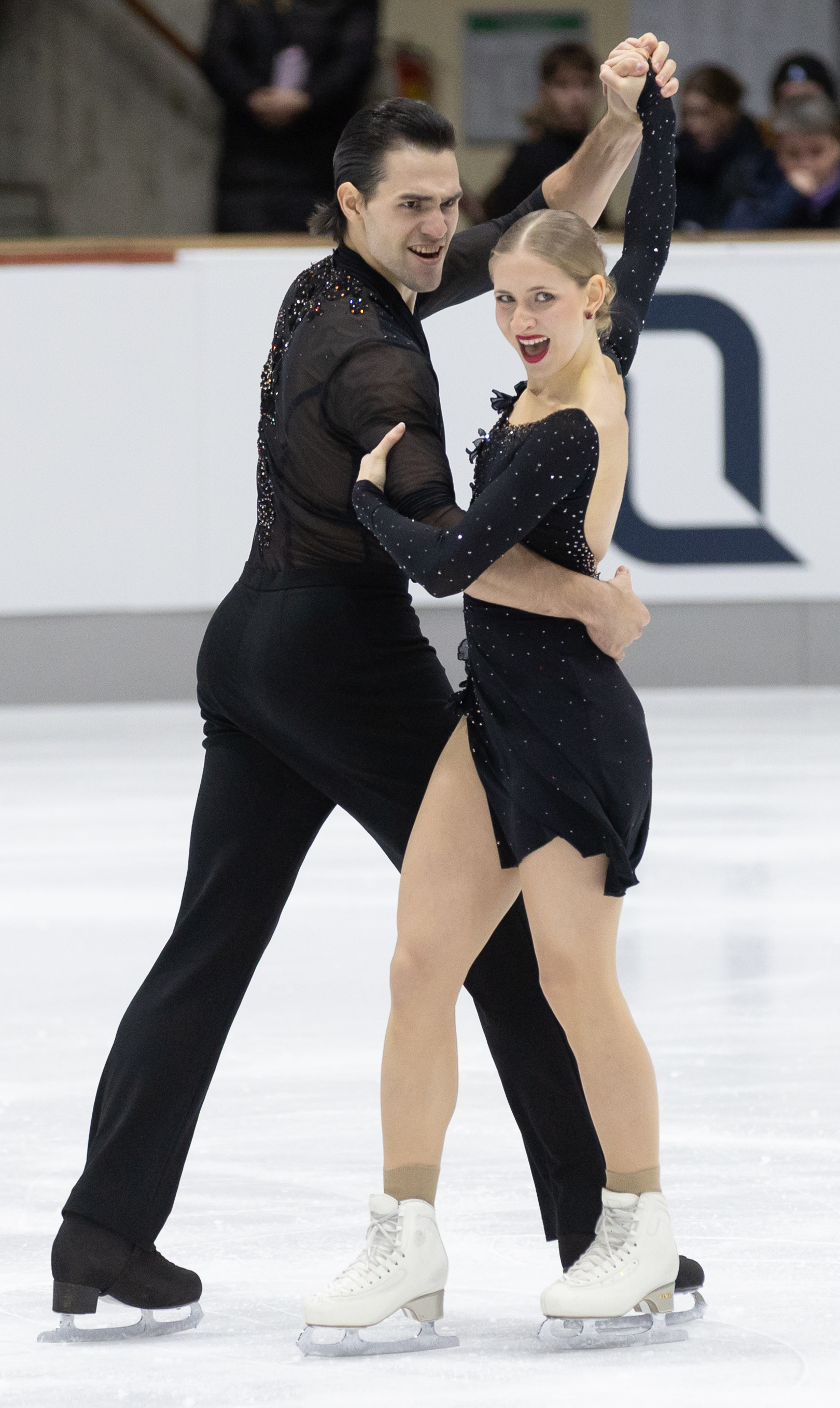
Hase and Volodin during their short program at the 2026 German Championships

Hase and Volodin opened their season at 2025 CS Nebelhorn Trophy where they won their third consecutive gold medal. The following month, they took silver at 2025 CS Trialeti Trophy earning their fifth ISU Challenger Series medal.

Three weeks later, Hase and Volodin competed at 2025 Skate Canada International. They placed first in the short program, but had two falls in the free skate and subsequently finished second overall. “We’re not quite happy with the performance,” said Hase. “There were two big mistakes, but the rest of the elements, besides the mistakes we were really happy with."

Hase and Volodin competed next at 2025 Finlandia Trophy where they won the gold, qualifying for the 2025-26 Grand Prix Final. "For the Final, we want to show even more emotions in both programs," said Volodin. "We were very nervous and made more mistakes at our last competition. In this Final, we want to skate with even more confidence."

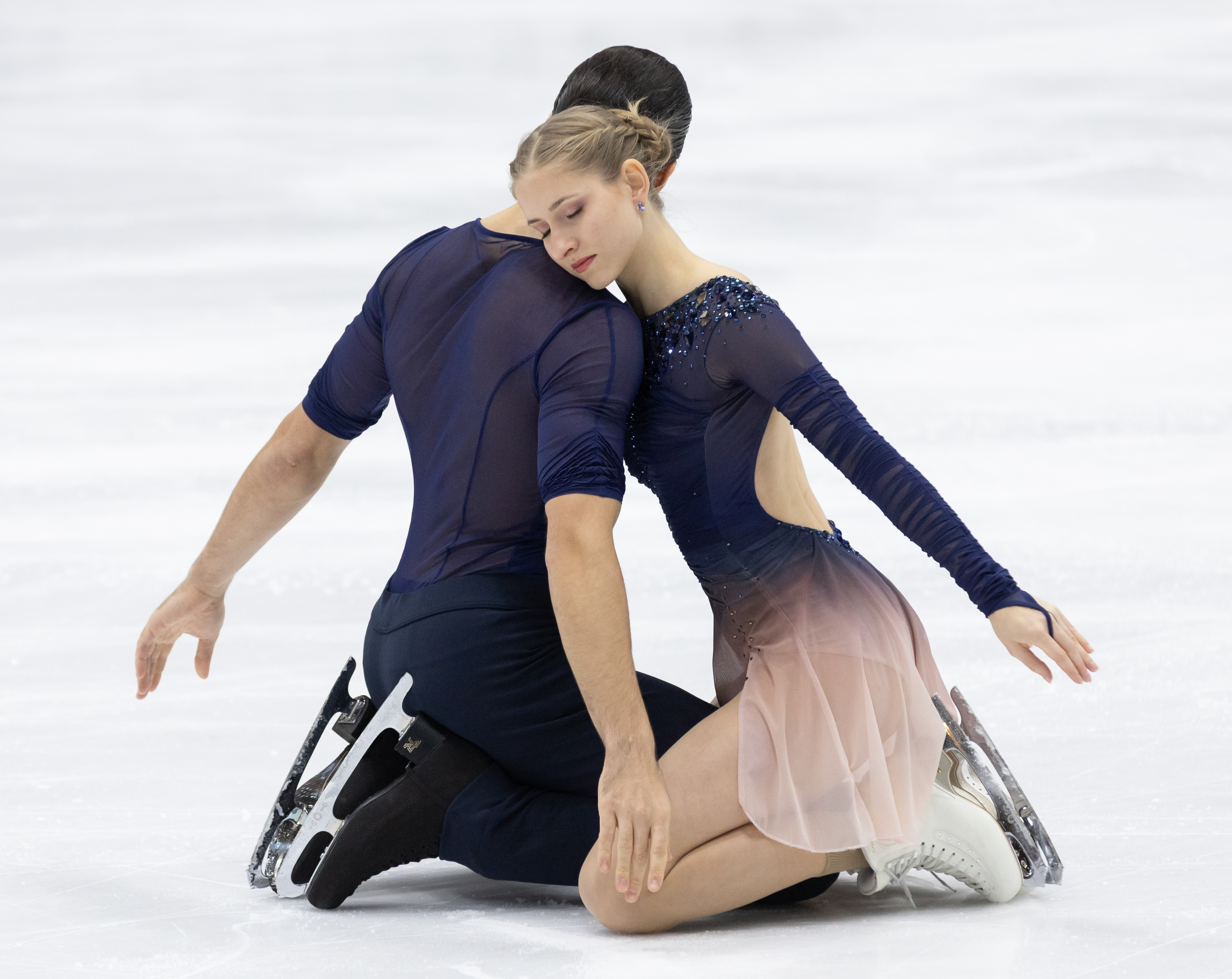
Hase and Volodin doing their opening free skate pose at the 2026 German Championships

The following month, Hase and Volodin competed at the 2025–26 Grand Prix Final where they finished fifth in the short program and first in the free skate with a new personal best. They took third place overall. "We were hoping for the whole season for a free program like that!" said Hase. "Last year it was a little bit easier for us to get a clean free, and this year we had many good shorts, but the free always had some mistakes." One week later, the pair won their third consecutive national title at the 2026 German Championships.

In January, Hase/Volodin won the silver medal at the 2026 European Championships. I think now we got a lot of motivation and energy to go back to practice," said Hase after the free skate. "And in three weeks, everything will hopefully come into place, and we can hopefully show our full potential." The team next competed at the 2026 Winter Olympics. "It's going to get down to who has the best nerves in both programs and who's going to be the most clean," said Hase of the Olympics. "We're all very strong teams. I think the past years of the Olympics, it was never like this, such a range of teams that can make the podium." The team led at the conclusion of the short program, but ultimately placed third, winning the bronze medal.

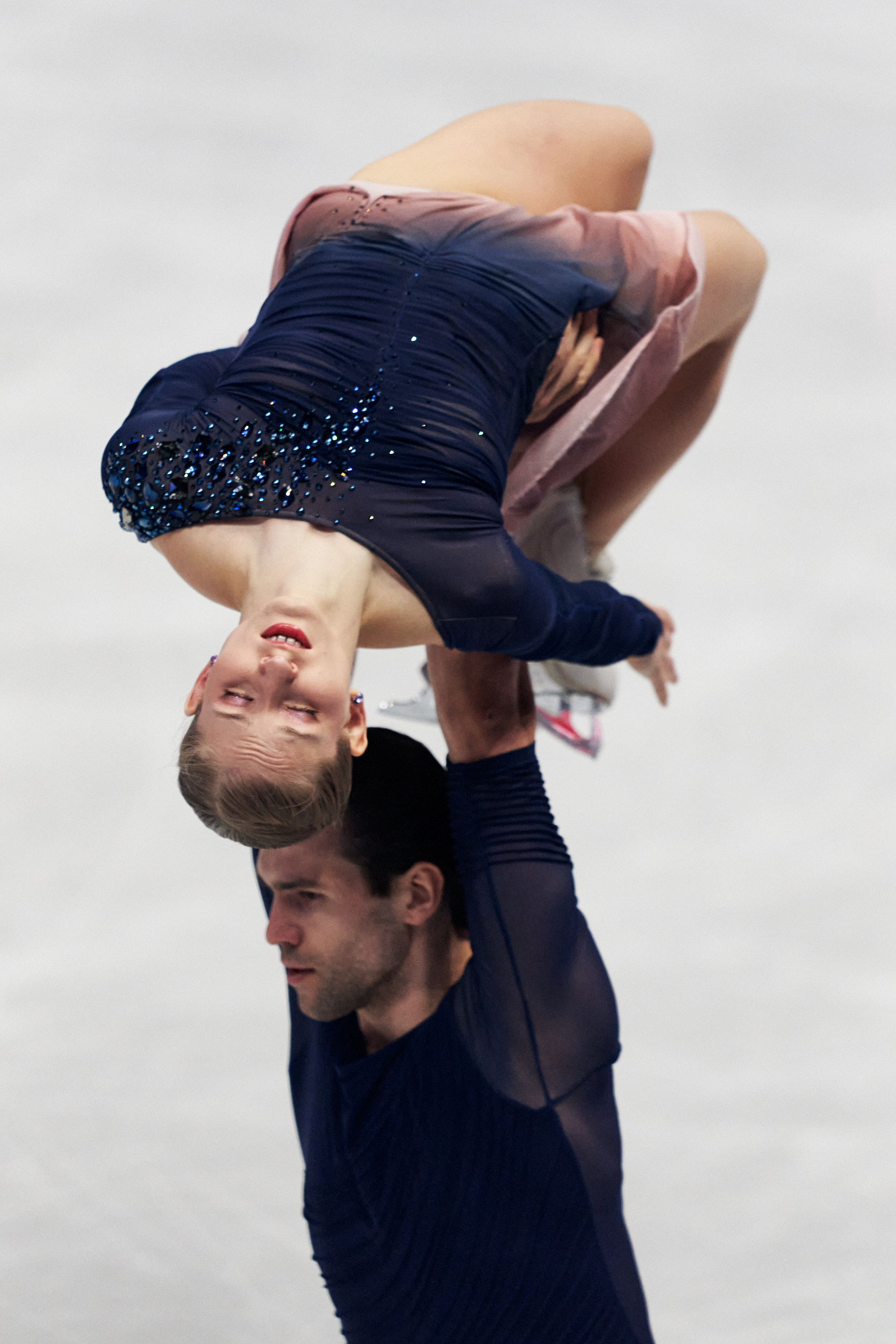
Hase and Volodin performing a lift at the 2026 World Championships

On 15 February, Hase/Volodin competed in the short program at the 2026 Winter Olympics, winning that segment with a personal best score. "We went onto the ice and wanted it to feel like training," said Hase following their short program. "To block out all the stress and the Olympics. It’s just another run. That’s how we went onto the ice. We did our job, and so of course we are very happy with the first part. But the big emotions, we’re saving those for later." The following day, Hase/Volodin placed third in the free skate due to mistakes on the side-by-side jumps, including Hase popping a planned triple Salchow into a single. As a result, they dropped to third overall behind Miura/Kihara and Metelkina/Berulava. Despite this, the pair expressed satisfaction with the result. "We are simply very relieved that it was enough for the bronze medal," Hase stated after their free skate. "No matter what color the medal is, we are just very proud that we were able to take a medal home from our first Olympic Games together, after only three years of skating together. I don’t think many people can say that about themselves. So the pride in our performance today is definitely bigger than anything else." Volodin added, "Bronze is one hundred percent a success. How can an Olympic medal be considered anything but a success? Yes, we were leading, but we knew we had very strong competitors here - the entire top ten. Every mistake is very costly. It’s great that under such conditions we were able to win a bronze medal."

The following month, Hase/Volodin competed at the 2026 World Figure Skating Championships place first in both the short program and free skate, taking the gold. “This medal means a lot,” said Hase. “It shows that we were on the right path and that we worked so hard to get here. Now we have a whole collection—bronze two years ago, silver last year, and now gold. It shows that we are growing as a team and that we can perform under pressure.”

=== 2026–27 season ===
Hase and Volodin began their season in November at the 2026 Skate America, where they secured the gold medal. Reflecting on their performance, Hase acknowledged that there was room for improvement but expressed overall satisfaction with their results. She noted several positive elements in their routines and viewed the competition as a foundation for further progress ahead of the NHK Trophy in Japan, scheduled to take place two weeks later.

== Programs ==
=== Pair skating with Nikita Volodin ===
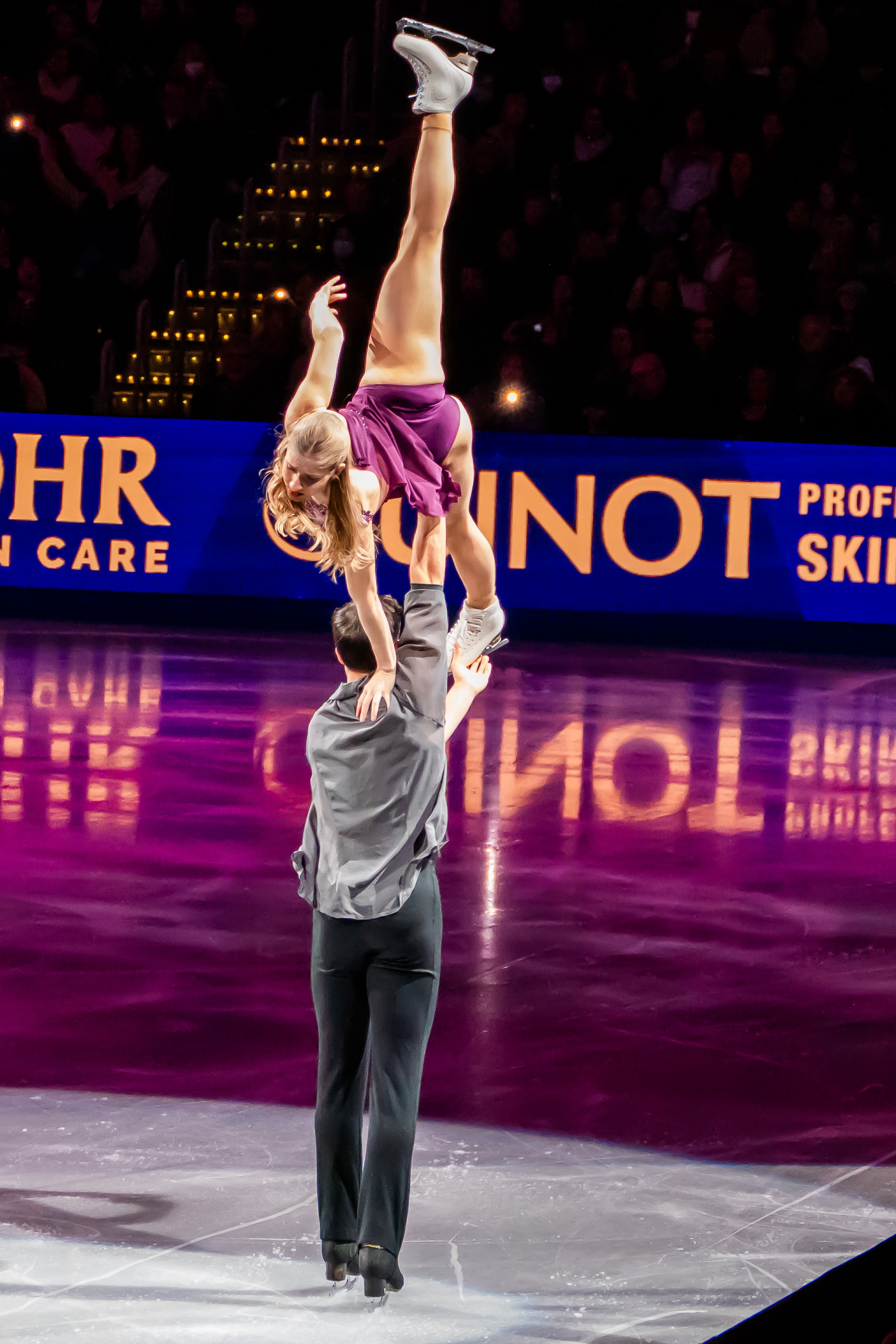
Hase and Volodin performing a lift during their exhibition program at the 2025 World Championships

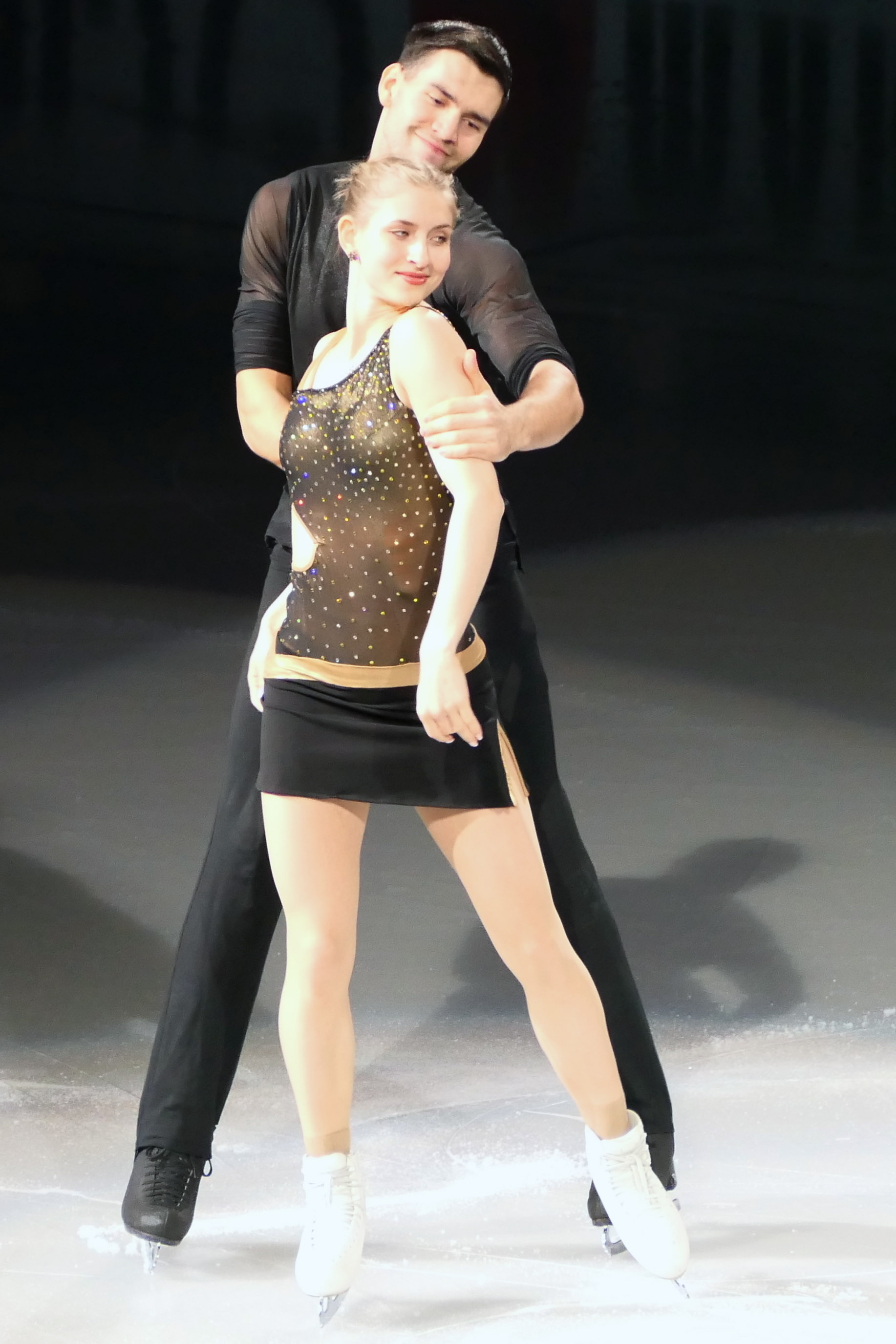
Hase and Volodin performing their exhibition program at the 2024 World Championships

Season	Short program	Free skating	Exhibition
2025–2026	El Abrazo by Maxime Rodriguez & Frédéric Ruiz choreo. by Paul Boll & Mark Pillay	Memoryhouse; Europe, after the Rain; November; Europe, after the Rain; Last Days by Max Richter choreo. by Benoît Richaud	Fortitude by HAEVN; Always Remember Us This Way (from A Star Is Born) by Lady Gaga choreo. by Paul Boll
2024–2025	You Were Mine by Tami Neilson choreo. by Paul Boll & Mark Pillay	The Four Seasons by Antonio Vivaldi; The Four Seasons, Concerto No. 4 in F Minor, RV 297, "Winter"; The Four Seasons - Summer (Re:scored) performed by London Music Works choreo. by Paul Boll & Mark Pillay	Only Love Can Hurt Like This by Paloma Faith choreo. by Paul Boll; The Winner Takes It All by ABBA; Always Remember Us This Way (from A Star Is Born) by Lady Gaga choreo. by Paul Boll; When a Man Loves a Woman by Michael Bolton
2023–2024	Stay by Rihanna & Mikky Ekko choreo. by Paul Boll & Mark Pillay	The Path of Silence; The Power of Mind by Anne-Sophie Versnaeyen, Gabriel Saban & Phillipe Briand choreo. by Paul Boll & Mark Pillay	When a Man Loves a Woman by Michael Bolton; Feel It Still by Portugal. The Man choreo. by Paul Boll

=== Pair skating with Nolan Seegert ===
Season	Short program	Free skating	Exhibition
2021–2022	You Are the Reason by Calum Scott & Leona Lewis choreo. by Mark Pillay	People Help the People by Cherry Ghost performed by Birdy choreo. by Mark Pillay	Breathe Me performed by Jonathan Roy
2020–2021	Open Hands by Trent Dabbs performed by Ingrid Michaelson choreo. by Mark Pillay	People Help the People by Cherry Ghost performed by Birdy choreo. by Mark Pillay	
2019–2020	Open Hands by Trent Dabbs performed by Ingrid Michaelson choreo. by Mark Pillay	The House of the Rising Sun performed by Heavy Young Heathens choreo. by Mark Pillay	
2018–2019	Say Something by A Great Big World performed by Christina Aguilera choreo. by Mark Pillay	The House of the Rising Sun performed by Heavy Young Heathens choreo. by Mark Pillay	
2017–2018	Say Something by A Great Big World performed by Christina Aguilera choreo. by Mark Pillay	New World Coming by DiSa, Benjam Wallfisch	
2016–2017	Torn (High Strung Soundtrack) by Nathan Lanier choreo. by Mark Pillay	Eleanor Rigby by The Beatles performed by Joshua Bell, Frankie Moreno choreo. by Paul Boll	
2015–2016	Music by John Miles choreo. by Paul Boll	Dance of the Knights (from Romeo and Juliet) by Sergei Prokofiev; Romeo and Juliet by Nino Rota choreo. by Paul Boll	
2014–2015	Music by John Miles choreo. by Paul Boll	Beyond Silence by Niki Reiser choreo. by Paul Boll	

== Competitive highlights ==
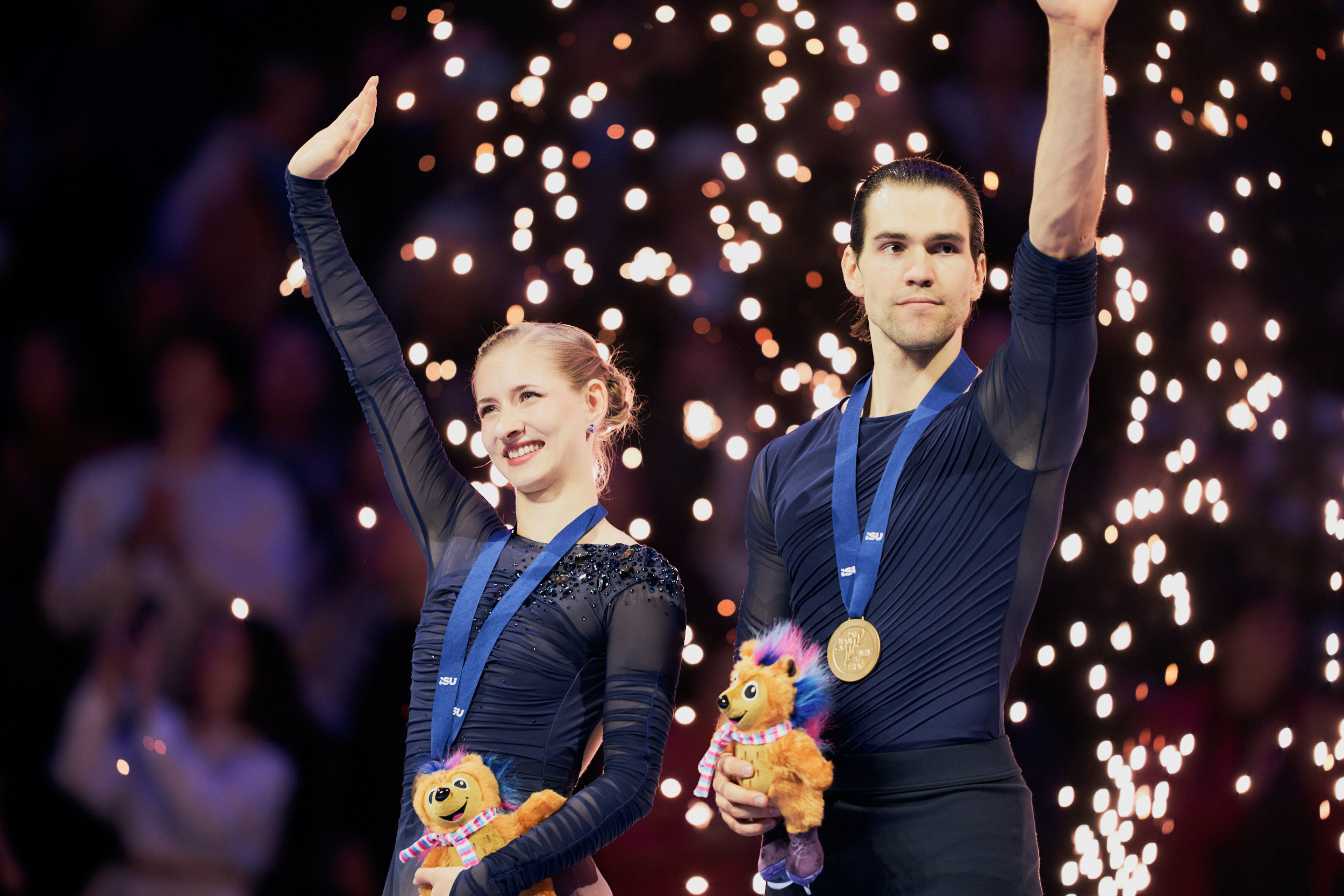
Hase/Volodin winning the gold medal at the 2026 World Championships

- GP – Event of the ISU Grand Prix Series
- JGP – Event of the ISU Junior Grand Prix Series
- CS – Event of the ISU Challenger Series
- TBD – Assigned
- WD – Withdrew from competition
- C – Event was cancelled

=== Pair skating with Nikita Volodin ===
Competition placements at senior level
Season	2023–24	2024–25	2025–26	2026-27
Winter Olympics			3rd	
World Championships	3rd	2nd	1st	
European Championships	5th	1st	2nd	
Grand Prix Final	1st	1st	3rd	
German Championships	1st	1st	1st	
GP Cup of China		2nd		
GP Finland	1st		1st	
GP France		1st		
GP NHK Trophy	1st			TBD
GP Skate America				1st
GP Skate Canada			2nd	
CS Lombardia Trophy	2nd			
CS Nebelhorn Trophy	1st	1st	1st	
CS Trialeti Trophy			2nd	
Budapest Trophy	1st			
Trophée Métropole Nice		1st		

=== Pair skating with Nolan Seegert ===
Competition placements at senior level
Season	2014–15	2015–16	2016–17	2017–18	2018–19	2019–20	2020–21	2021–22
Winter Olympics								16th
World Championships			19th		13th	C		5th
European Championships	11th		12th		6th	5th		8th
German Championships	2nd	3rd	WD	2nd	1st	1st		1st
GP France					7th	7th		
GP NHK Trophy								7th
GP Rostelecom Cup						3rd		
GP Skate America					5th			
GP Skate Canada								5th
CS Finlandia Trophy			7th	8th				7th
CS Golden Spin of Zagreb					4th	3rd		
CS Ice Star				4th				
CS Nebelhorn Trophy		6th	6th		4th	5th	WD	1st
CS Tallinn Trophy		6th						
CS Warsaw Cup			3rd	3rd				
Bavarian Open		2nd						
Challenge Cup	3rd				1st			
Cup of Nice		4th						
Cup of Tyrol			3rd					
Mentor Cup	3rd		4th					
NRW Trophy	3rd	1st	1st				2nd	
Sarajevo Open		2nd						

=== Single skating ===
Competition placements at junior level
Season	2015–16
German Championships	5th

== Detailed results ==
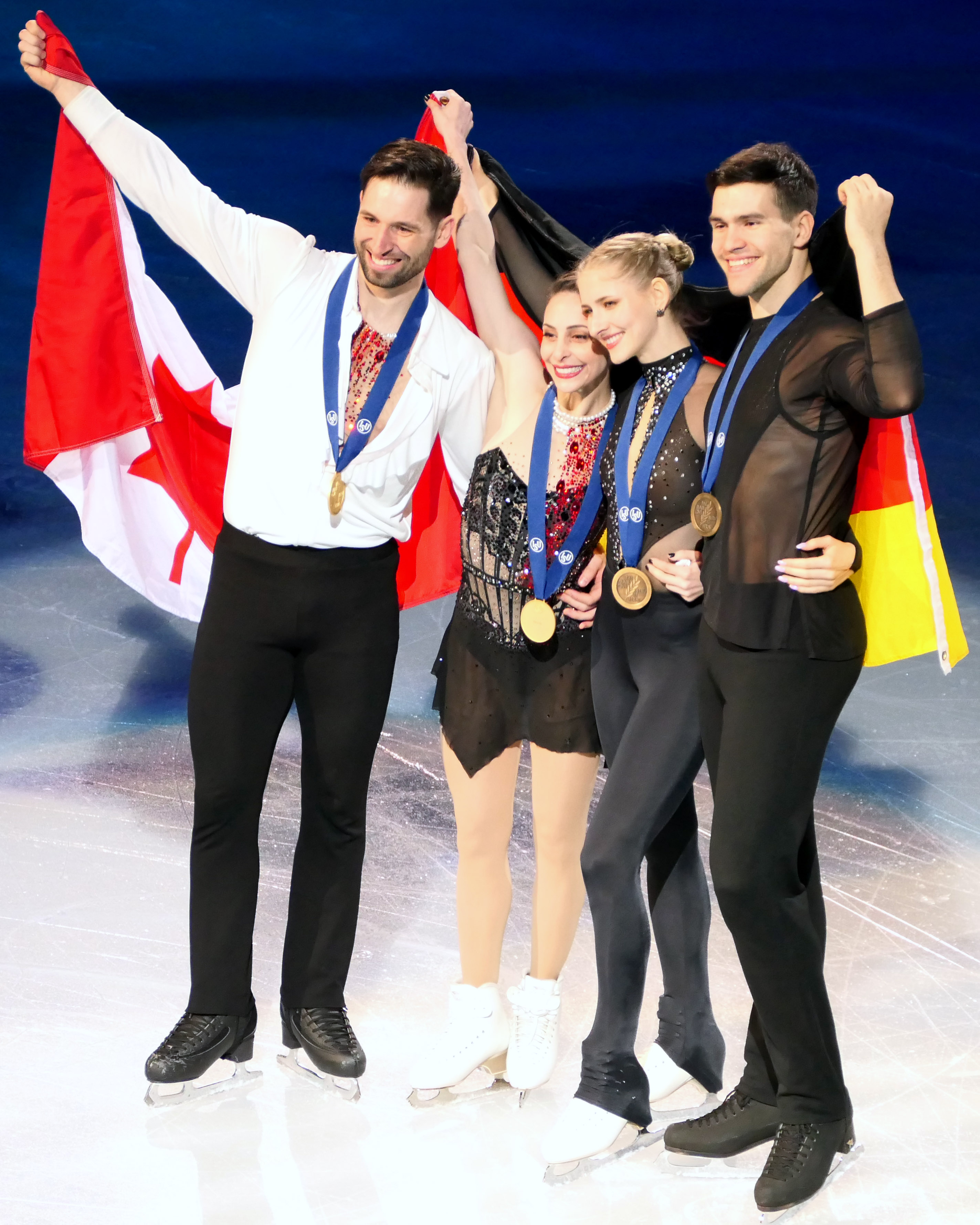
Hase/Volodin with Stellato-Dudek/Deschamps during the medal ceremony at the 2024 World Championships

=== Pair skating with Nikita Volodin ===
ISU personal best scores in the +5/-5 GOE System
Segment	Type	Score	Event
Total	TSS	228.33	2026 World Championships
Short program	TSS	80.01	2026 Winter Olympics
Short program	TES	43.91	2026 Winter Olympics
Short program	PCS	36.28	2026 World Championships
Free skating	TSS	149.57	2025–26 Grand Prix Final
Free skating	TES	78.81	2025–26 Grand Prix Final
Free skating	PCS	71.16	2025 CS Nebelhorn Trophy

- Small medals for the short program and free skating are only awarded at ISU Championships.

Results in the 2023–24 season
Date	Event	SP		FS		Total	
Date	Event	P	Score	P	Score	P	Score
Sep 8–10, 2023	(Italy) 2023 CS Lombardia Trophy	3	66.22	2	128.30	2	194.52
Sep 20–23, 2023	(Germany) 2023 CS Nebelhorn Trophy	3	62.85	1	132.11	1	194.96
Oct 13–15, 2023	(Hungary) 2023 Budapest Trophy	2	62.51	1	133.73	1	196.24
Nov 17–19, 2023	(Finland) 2023 Grand Prix of Espoo	3	63.59	1	129.13	1	192.72
Nov 24–26, 2023	(Japan) 2023 NHK Trophy	1	67.23	1	135.28	1	202.51
Dec 7–10, 2023	(China) 2023–24 Grand Prix Final	1	72.56	2	133.87	1	206.43
Dec 14–16, 2023	(Germany) 2024 German Championships	1	77.38	1	141.39	1	218.77
Jan 8–14, 2024	(Lithuania) 2024 European Championships	2	69.63	6	121.06	5	190.69
Mar 18–24, 2024	(Canada) 2024 World Championships	4	72.10	3	138.30	3	210.40

Results in the 2024–25 season
Date	Event	SP		FS		Total	
Date	Event	P	Score	P	Score	P	Score
Sep 19–21, 2024	(Germany) 2024 CS Nebelhorn Trophy	1	73.94	1	144.50	1	218.44
Oct 16–20, 2024	(France) 2024 Trophée Métropole Nice Côte d'Azur	1	71.66	—N/a	—N/a	1	71.66
Nov 1–3, 2024	2024 Grand Prix de France	1	73.72	1	137.97	1	211.69
Nov 22–24, 2024	2024 Cup of China	2	68.44	1	140.92	2	209.36
Dec 5–8, 2024	(France) 2024–25 Grand Prix Final	1	76.72	1	141.38	1	218.10
Dec 16–21, 2024	(Germany) 2025 German Championships	1	70.35	1	129.18	1	199.53
Jan 28 – Feb 2, 2025	(Estonia) 2025 European Championships	1	71.59	1	140.89	1	212.48
Mar 25–30, 2025	(United States) 2025 World Championships	3	73.59	1	145.49	2	219.08

Note: The senior pairs free skate at the 2024 Trophée Métropole Nice Côte d'Azur was cancelled on account of inclement weather. It was later announced that the short program results would be considered as the final results for the competition.

Results in the 2025–26 season
Date	Event	SP		FS		Total	
Date	Event	P	Score	P	Score	P	Score
Sep 25–27, 2025	(Germany) 2025 CS Nebelhorn Trophy	2	77.61	1	143.77	1	221.38
Oct 8–11, 2025	(Georgia (country)) 2025 CS Trialeti Trophy	2	74.67	2	133.61	2	208.28
Oct 31 – Nov 2, 2025	2025 Skate Canada International	1	77.53	3	129.65	2	207.18
Nov 21–23, 2025	(Finland) 2025 Finlandia Trophy	1	70.40	1	136.48	1	206.88
Dec 4–7, 2025	(Japan) 2025-26 Grand Prix Final	5	71.68	1	149.57	3	221.25
Dec 8–13, 2025	(Germany) 2026 German Championships	1	77.27	1	145.86	1	223.13
Jan 13–18, 2026	(United Kingdom) 2026 European Championships	2	74.81	3	129.06	2	203.87
Feb 6–19, 2026	(Italy) 2026 Winter Olympics	1	80.01	4	139.08	3	219.09
Mar 24–29, 2026	(Czech Republic) 2026 World Championships	1	79.78	1	148.55	1	228.33

Results in the 2026–27 season
Date	Event	SP		FS		Total	
Date	Event	P	Score	P	Score	P	Score
Nov 13-15, 2026	(United States) 2026 Skate America	1	72.71	1	128.08	1	200.79

=== Pair skating with Nolan Seegert ===
Results in the 2020–21 season
Date	Event	SP		FS		Total	
Date	Event	P	Score	P	Score	P	Score
Sep 23–26, 2020	(Germany) 2020 CS Nebelhorn Trophy	1	63.91	–	–	–	WD
Nov 26–29, 2020	(Germany) 2020 NRW Trophy	1	64.46	2	91.49	2	155.95

Results in the 2021–22 season
Date	Event	SP		FS		Total	
Date	Event	P	Score	P	Score	P	Score
Sep 22–25, 2021	(Germany) 2021 CS Nebelhorn Trophy	2	66.26	2	118.99	1	185.25
Oct 7–10, 2021	(Finland) 2021 CS Finlandia Trophy	5	65.19	6	123.18	7	188.37
Oct 29–31, 2021	2021 Skate Canada International	3	67.93	5	118.89	5	186.82
Nov 12–14, 2021	(Japan) 2021 NHK Trophy	7	54.63	7	107.26	7	161.89
Dec 9–11, 2021	(Germany) 2022 German Championships	1	68.94	1	128.70	1	197.64
Jan 10–16, 2022	(Estonia) 2022 European Championships	5	62.21	9	106.54	8	168.75
Feb 18–19, 2022	(China) 2022 Winter Olympics	14	62.37	16	87.32	16	149.69
Mar 21–27, 2022	(France) 2022 World Championships	6	66.29	5	123.32	5	189.61

2019–20 season
Date	Event	SP	FS	Total
January 20–26, 2020	2020 European Championships	5; 70.43	5; 115.96	5; 186.39
January 1–3, 2020	2020 German Championships	1; 67.49	1; 124.42	1; 191.91
December 4–7, 2019	2019 CS Golden Spin of Zagreb	2; 68.30	3; 116.79	3; 185.09
November 15–17, 2019	2019 Rostelecom Cup	4; 67.74	4; 118.42	3; 186.16
November 1–3, 2019	2019 Internationaux de France	6; 59.13	7; 103.96	7; 163.09
September 25–29, 2019	2019 CS Nebelhorn Trophy	3; 67.99	6; 114.31	5; 182.30
2018–19 season
Date	Event	SP	FS	Total
March 18–24, 2019	2019 World Championships	10; 64.28	14; 109.76	13; 174.04
February 21–24, 2019	2019 International Challenge Cup	1; 67.56	2; 117.82	1; 185.38
January 21–27, 2019	2019 European Championships	6; 60.08	5; 120.48	6; 180.56
December 21–23, 2018	2019 German Championships	1; 66.86	2; 107.83	1; 174.69
December 5–8, 2018	2018 CS Golden Spin of Zagreb	4; 62.97	4; 109.21	4; 172.18
November 23–25, 2018	2018 Internationaux de France	7; 52.61	6; 102.16	7; 154.77
October 19–21, 2018	2018 Skate America	3; 60.04	5; 102.06	5; 162.10
September 26–29, 2018	2018 CS Nebelhorn Trophy	2; 58.27	6; 103.34	4; 161.61
2017–18 season
Date	Event	SP	FS	Total
December 14–16, 2017	2018 German Championships	2; 59.58	2; 109.41	2; 168.99
November 16–19, 2017	2017 CS Warsaw Cup	2; 59.92	3; 107.80	3; 167.72
October 26–29, 2017	2017 CS Ice Star	3; 55.38	4; 97.78	4; 153.16
October 6–8, 2017	2017 CS Finlandia Trophy	8; 45.67	8; 89.71	8; 135.38
2016–17 season
Date	Event	SP	FS	Total
March 29–April 2, 2017	2017 World Championships	19; 59.76	–	19; 59.76
February 28–March 5, 2017	2017 Mentor Toruń Cup	3; 58.30	3; 100.40	3; 158.70
January 25–29, 2017	2017 European Championships	13; 51.27	12; 96.13	12; 147.40
January 10–15, 2017	2017 Mentor Toruń Cup	4; 48.62	4; 89.47	4; 138.09
November 30–December 4, 2016	2016 NRW Trophy	2; 49.81	1; 87.22	1; 137.03
November 17–20, 2016	2016 CS Warsaw Cup	3; 49.12	2; 92.50	3; 141.62
October 6–10, 2016	2016 CS Finlandia Trophy	7; 50.28	8; 77.27	7; 127.55
September 22–24, 2016	2016 CS Nebelhorn Trophy	6; 44.00	6; 91.54	6; 135.54
2015–16 season
Date	Event	SP	FS	Total
February 17–21, 2016	2016 Bavarian Open	2; 52.06	3; 88.28	2; 140.34
February 4–6, 2016	2016 Sarajevo Open	2; 45.36	2; 86.06	2; 131.42
December 11–13, 2015	2016 German Championships	3; 54.52	3; 89.02	3; 143.54
November 24–29, 2015	2015 NRW Trophy	1; 43.10	1; 72.77	1; 115.87
November 18–22, 2015	2015 CS Tallinn Trophy	4; 50.76	7; 87.46	6; 138.22
October 14–18, 2015	2015 International Cup of Nice	4; 42.78	4; 75.84	4; 118.62
September 24–26, 2015	2015 CS Nebelhorn Trophy	6; 50.29	6; 79.77	6; 130.06
2014–15 season
Date	Event	SP	FS	Total
February 19–22, 2015	2015 International Challenge Cup	3; 44.83	3; 82.87	3; 127.70
January 26–February 1, 2015	2015 European Championships	11; 42.13	10; 79.16	11; 121.29
January 7–10, 2015	2014 Mentor Toruń Cup	3; 42.41	3; 78.93	3; 121.34
December 11–13, 2014	2015 German Championships	2; 38.61	2; 79.80	2; 118.41
November 26–30, 2014	2014 NRW Trophy	3; 38.80	3; 63.44	3; 102.24
