= 2015 German Figure Skating Championships =

- Type: National championship
- Date: December 12 – 14, 2014
- Season: 2014–15
- Location: Stuttgart
- Venue: Eiswelt Stuttgart
- Previous: 2014 German Championships
- Next: 2016 German Championships

The 2015 German Figure Skating Championships (German: Deutsche Meisterschaften im Eiskunstlaufen 2015) was held on December 12–14, 2014 at the Eiswelt Stuttgart in Stuttgart. Medals were awarded in the disciplines of men's singles, women's singles, pair skating, and ice dance. The results are part of the criteria used to choose the German teams to the 2015 World Championships and 2015 European Championships.

== Medalists ==
=== Senior ===
Discipline	Gold	Silver	Bronze
Men	Franz Streubel	Paul Fentz	Christopher Berneck
Ladies	Nicole Schott	Nathalie Weinzierl	Lutricia Bock
Pairs	Mari Vartmann / Aaron van Cleave	Minerva-Fabienne Hase / Nolan Seegert	No other competitors
Ice dancing	Nelli Zhiganshina / Alexander Gazsi	Jennifer Urban / Sevan Lerche	Nathalie Rehfeld / Bennet Preiss

=== Junior ===
Discipline	Gold	Silver	Bronze
Men	Anton Kempf	Catalin Dimitrescu	Dave Kötting
Ladies	Lea Johanna Dastich	Maria Katharina Herceg	Kristina Isaev
Pairs	Minori Yuge / Jannis Bronisefski	No other competitors	
Ice dancing	Katharina Müller / Tim Dieck	Ria Schwendinger / Valentin Wunderlich	Leah-Magdalena Steffan / Benjamin Steffan

== Senior results ==
The Deutsche Eislauf Union published the list of entries in November 2014.

=== Men's singles ===
Rank	Name	Total points	SP		FS	
1	Franz Streubel	209.63	2	70.74	1	138.89
2	Paul Fentz	206.13	1	72.62	2	133.51
3	Christopher Berneck	178.95	4	63.15	3	115.80
4	Martin Rappe	162.32	5	57.87	5	104.45
5	Alexander Bjelde	157.27	6	51.52	4	105.75
6	Panagiotis Polizoakis	152.28	8	48.23	6	104.05
7	Niko Ulanovsky	139.70	7	51.31	7	88.39
WD	Peter Liebers	WD	3	66.62	Withdrew from competition	
WD	Alexander Betke	WD	9	33.23	Withdrew from competition	

=== Women's singles ===
Rank	Name	Total points	SP		FS	
1	Nicole Schott	165.28	2	58.01	1	107.27
2	Nathalie Weinzierl	156.09	1	58.20	2	97.89
3	Lutricia Bock	145.85	3	57.19	4	88.66
4	Sarah Hecken	134.71	6	40.37	3	94.34
5	Anne Zetzsche	121.56	4	41.66	5	79.90
6	Jennifer Parker	118.11	5	40.79	6	77.32
7	Anneli Kawelke	104.86	8	34.19	7	70.67
8	Alina Mayer	100.62	9	33.17	8	67.45

=== Pair skating ===
Rank	Name	Total points	SP		FS	
1	Mari Vartmann / Aaron Van Cleave	154.61	1	56.38	1	98.23
2	Minerva-Fabienne Hase / Nolan Seegert	118.41	2	38.61	2	79.80

=== Ice dance ===
Rank	Name	Total points	SD		FD	
1	Nelli Zhiganshina / Alexander Gazsi	164.84	1	66.08	1	98.76
2	Jennifer Urban / Sevan Lerche	120.17	2	47.27	2	72.90
3	Nathalie Rehfeld / Bennet Preiss	94.30	3	33.73	3	60.57
