= Audiomachine =

American production music company

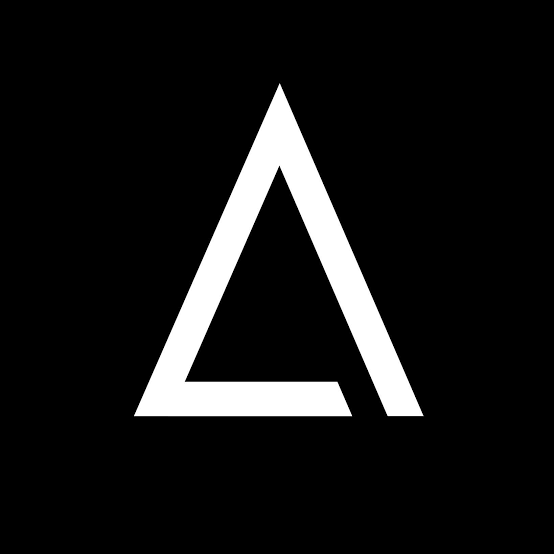
- Genre: Trailer music, symphonic, electronic, instrumental
- Founded: August 20, 2005
- Founders: Paul Dinletir; Carol Sovinski
- Headquarters: Beverly Hills, California, U.S.
- Products: Music production
- Members: Paul Dinletir; Kevin Rix; Dean Grinsfelder; Greg Townley; Jeffrey R. Marsh; Jochen Flach; John Allen Graves; Ken Berry; Martyn Corbet; Matt McKenna; Michael Patti; Michael Rubino
- Website: audiomachine.com

Audiomachine is an American production music company based in Beverly Hills, California. The company was founded by Paul Dinletir and Carol Sovinski in August 2005, producing music composed by Paul Dinletir and Kevin Rix.

== About the company ==
Audiomachine initially focused on producing music for movie trailers and advertisements. Its music has also been featured in the 2010, 2012 and 2014 Olympic games official program labeled as Epic Music.

Many of Audiomachine's tracks have been featured in theatrical movie trailers, including those of Avatar, The Chronicles of Narnia films, Iron Man, Venom, Avengers: Endgame, and Dune.

Originally, Audiomachine released albums only for the film industry's professional use, but since 2012 it has released selected albums and compilations for the general public as well. The industry-released albums include Deus Ex Machina, Phenomena, Origins, Leviathan, Awakenings, Millennium, and Monolith.

== Composers ==
=== Paul Dinletir ===
Paul Dinletir initially just played piano and wanted to be a songwriter and jazz pianist. His wife was able to get him into a film and television music UCLA taught by Robert Etoll, who became a collaborator. This led to him becoming a composer for X-Ray Dog, where he composed trailers for cartoons (such as Samurai Jack until season 4) and reality TV shows; due to his enjoyment from trailer music, he begun to work on it full-time. Dinletir's influences are Mozart, Beethoven, and Debussy. He used Logic Pro software for 15 years and switched to Steinberg Cubase.

=== Kevin Rix ===
Kevin Rix started out playing guitar and was in various rock bands growing up. At music school, where he was introduced to classical music and jazz, he started realizing his interests in composing and in working with different instruments and sounds. After a few years he decided to compose professionally. At first he wanted to get into writing film soundtracks. While he was working on a demo reel, he obtained a job editing and mixing ringtones for a company, where he met Dinletir. He started in the profession as Dinletir's assistant doing sound design. Rix's influences include Mozart, Bach, Debussy, Rush, Mastodon, Soundgarden, Hans Zimmer, and Harry Gregson-Williams.

== Placements ==
Along with Harry Gregson-Williams, Audiomachine is responsible for the soundtrack of the 2014 video game Call of Duty: Advanced Warfare, the first game in the Call of Duty series to be developed by Sledgehammer Games.

Music from its albums was used in:

- Trailers, teasers for movies: Hancock, Fantastic Four: Rise of the Silver Surfer, Harry Potter and the Order of the Phoenix, Kung Fu Panda, Spider-Man 3, Transformers, Angels & Demons, Venom, Avatar, Hellboy II: The Golden Army, Hugo, I Am Legend, Live Free or Die Hard, Pride and Glory, Prometheus, Rise of the Guardians, The Hobbit: An Unexpected Journey, The Hobbit: The Desolation of Smaug, Up, Thor: The Dark World, Noah, Exodus: Gods and Kings, How to Train Your Dragon 2, Inkheart, Blood Diamond, The Prestige, Cinderella, Beauty and the Beast, Hidden Figures, Rogue One, A Cure for Wellness, The Lost City of Z, Spider-Man: Homecoming, Split, Monster Trucks, Storks, Fantastic Beasts and Where to Find Them, Miss Peregrine's Home for Peculiar Children, The Martian, Avengers: Infinity War, Christopher Robin, Avengers: Endgame, Frozen 2. and Black Widow.
- Trailers, teasers for TV series: iBoy, Prison Break, Game of Thrones, Westworld, Voltron: Legendary Defender, and The Last Kingdom.
- Others:
  - The track "Carpe Diem" from album Magnus: B Sides was used in the highlight clip Porsche's win of the FIA WEC 2016. Also, "An Unfinished Life" from album Tree of Life was used in the clip Porsche Le Mans 2016.
  - "Warland's Fury," "The Lion's Heart" and "Voyage of Dreams" from the public release Decimus were featured in the NBC's 2016 Summer Olympics Opening Montage.
  - "Gathering of the Clans" was featured throughout the entire opening montage of the 88th Academy Awards broadcasts.
  - "Akkadian Empire" was used in the launch trailer of StarCraft II: Wings of Liberty.
  - "The Final Hour" from the album Magnus was used in the credits of Channel 4's SAS: Who Dares Wins (series 3).
  - "Eternal Flame" from Epica was used in the final video of the 2016 convention of Jehovah's Witnesses - Jehovah Will Treat His Loyal One in a Special Way.
  - "Dauntless" was featured in the Mass Effect Legendary Edition reveal trailer.

== Discography ==
=== Studio albums ===
Year	Title	Public release	Peak chart positions
Year	Title	Public release	US Classical
2005	Big, Big and Bigger	ー	×
2005	Tools of the Trade 1	ー	×
2006	Atomic Music Station	ー	×
2006	Trailer Acts	ー	×
2006	Tools of the Trade 2	ー	×
2007	The Platinum Series I	ー	×
2007	The Lighter Side	ー	×
2007	Blood, Death & Fears	ー	×
2008	The Platinum Series II	ー	×
2008	Tools of the Trade 3	ー	×
2008	Terminus	ー	×
2009	The Platinum Series III: Eterna	ー	×
2009	Trailer Acts 2	ー	×
2009	Maelstrom	ー	×
2010	The Platinum Series IV: Labyrinth	ー	×
2010	Deus Ex Machina	ー	×
2010	The Ensemble Series: Volume 1	ー	×
2011	Blood Bath and Beyond	ー	×
2011	Drumscores	ー	×
2011	Epica	○	5
2012	Tools of the Trade 4	ー	×
2012	Leviathan	ー	×
2012	Helios	○	ー
2012	Awakenings	ー	×
2013	Millennium	ー	×
2013	Origins	ー	×
2013	Phenomena	○	2
2014	Tools of the Trade 5: Tones Textures and Transitions	ー	×
2014	Monolith	ー	×
2014	Phantasm	ー	×
2014	Psychosis	ー	×
2015	Intros	ー	×
2015	Titan	ー	×
2015	Decimus	○	13
2016	Prototype	ー	×
2016	Worlds of Wonder	○	ー
2016	Drumscores 2	ー	×
2017	Tools of the Trade: Epic Spaces	ー	×
2017	Tools of the Trade: Rises	ー	×
2017	Tools of the Trade: Epic Foley	ー	×
2017	Modern Tension: Cold Sweat	ー	×
2017	Pulses: Palpitate	ー	×
2017	Percussive Mayhem: Anarchy	ー	×
2017	Eternal Rest	ー	×
2017	Piano Premontions: Parallels	ー	×
2017	Life	○	15
2018	Tools of the Trade: Submerged	ー	×
2018	Tools of the Trade: Pings and Powerdowns	ー	×
2018	Chrome Over Brass	ー	×
2018	Trailerized: Covers and Originals	○	ー
2018	Tools of the Trade: Scapes	ー	×
2018	La Belle Époque	○	21
2018	Synesthesia	ー	×
2018	Volturnus	○	ー
2018	The 11th Hour	ー	×
2018	Percussive Mayhem: Odd Rhythms	ー	×
2018	Kill Process	ー	×
2018	The Wicked Will Rot	ー	×
2018	Ascendance	○	9
2018	Exogenesis	○	ー
2018	Intros 2	ー	×
2018	Prototype: Source Code	ー	×
2018	A Measure of Darkness	ー	×
2018	Mental Minefield	ー	×
2019	Banshee	ー	×
2019	Retrograde	ー	×
2019	Here and Now	ー	×
2019	Burn Point	ー	×
2019	Another Sky	○	ー
2019	Reimagined	○	ー
2019	Nomad	ー	×
2019	Chrome Over Brass 2	ー	×
2019	Percussive Mayhem: Modern Rhythms	ー	×
2020	Insomnia	ー	×
2020	The Best Things in Life	ー	×
2020	Lineage	ー	×
2021	Cinematix	○	ー
2021	Viscera	ー	×
2021	Inertia	ー	×
2021	Promethium	ー	×
2021	Believe	ー	×
2021	War for Light	ー	×
2021	'Twas the Night	ー	×
2021	The Fire and the Fury	○	ー
2021	Ophelia Riddle and the Book of Secret Stories	ー	×
2021	Decadence	ー	×
2021	The Devil Doesn't Sleep	ー	×
2021	Dominion	ー	×
2022	Prototype: Natural Selection	ー	×
2022	Amongst the Shimmering Light	ー	×
2022	Intros 3	ー	×
2022	Disciple	ー	×
2022	Rise	○	×
2022	Colony	○	×
2022	It All Ends Now	○	×
2026	Equilibrium	○	×

=== Remix albums ===
Year	Title	Public release
2014	Remixed	○

=== Studio Series ===
Year	Title	Public release
2020	Human	ー
2020	Touchstone	ー
2020	True Crime	ー
2020	Ohms	ー
2020	Body Beats	ー
2020	Criminal Underground	ー
2020	Replicant	ー
2020	Exit Strategy	ー
2020	Scorched Earth	ー
2020	Black Tie	ー
2020	Timber and Tumbleweeds	ー
2020	Ministry of Silly Strings	ー
2020	Analog Prophecies	ー
2020	The Road Back	ー
2020	Percussive Pacesetters	ー
2020	Fragmented Reality	ー
2020	Punchline	ー
2020	Lucid	ー
2020	State of Grace	ー
2020	In a Daydream	ー
2020	Inside Joke	ー
2020	The Face of Light	ー
2020	Storytellers	ー
2020	Dawn Patrol	ー
2020	Stricks and Bones	ー
2020	Emergence	ー
2020	Strummin' Summer	ー
2020	Ultra	ー
2020	Dyad	ー
2020	Living Dust	ー
2020	Kicks and Shakers	ー
2020	The Measure of Moments	ー
2020	Dark Web	ー
2020	Ritmo de la Gente	ー
2021	Axiom	ー
2021	Ecosystem	ー
2021	Sora	ー
2021	Kaleidoscope	ー
2021	Be Yourself	ー
2021	Strung Out	ー
2021	Rise of a Champion	ー
2021	Get Down	ー
2021	Be Free	ー

=== Compilation albums ===
Year	Title	Public release	Peak chart positions
Year	Title	Public release	US Classical
2012	Chronicles	○	5
2012	Uplifting and Inspiration Volume One	ー	×
2013	Tree of Life	○	2
2013	50,000 Likes Fan Appreciation Compilation	ー	×
2013	Existence	○	ー
2014	Summer Blockbuster Volume 1	ー	×
2014	Suspense and Horror Volume 1	ー	×
2015	Magnus	○	2
2016	Magnus: B-Sides	○	ー
2022	Greatest Hits	○	ー

=== Singles and EPs ===
Year	Title	Public release
2013	Trilogy	○
2013	Blood and Stone	○
2014	Champions Will Rise: Epic Music from the 2014 Winter Olympics	○
2020	We Are Gods	○

=== Soundtracks ===
Year	Title
2014	Call of Duty: Advanced Warfare (Original Game Soundtrack)
2021	SAS: Who Dares Wins Season 1-5 (Original Series Soundtrack)
2021	Anchorage Alaska Air National Guard / Demo Video by Dustin Farrell Phantom of the Raptor
