= 2017 German Figure Skating Championships =

- Type: National Championship
- Date: December 15 – 17, 2016
- Season: 2016–17
- Location: Berlin
- Venue: Erika-Heß-Eisstadion
- Previous: 2016 German Championships
- Next: 2018 German Championships

The 2017 German Figure Skating Championships (German: Deutsche Meisterschaften im Eiskunstlaufen 2017) was held on December 15–17, 2016 at the Erika-Heß-Eisstadion in Berlin. Skaters competed in the disciplines of men's singles, women's singles, pair skating, ice dance, and synchronized skating on the senior, junior, and novice levels. The results of the national championships were among the criteria used to choose the German teams to the 2017 World Championships and 2017 European Championships.

== Medalists ==
=== Senior ===
Discipline	Gold	Silver	Bronze
Men	Peter Liebers	Paul Fentz	Franz Streubel
Ladies	Nathalie Weinzierl	Lea Johanna Dastich	Annika Hocke
Pairs	Mari Vartmann / Ruben Blommaert	~~Minerva-Fabienne Hase / Nolan Seegert~~	No other competitors
Ice dancing	Kavita Lorenz / Joti Polizoakis	Katharina Müller / Tim Dieck	Shari Koch / Christian Nüchtern
Synchronized	Team Berlin 1	Skating Graces	No other competitors

=== Junior ===
Discipline	Gold	Silver	Bronze
Men			
Ladies			
Pairs			
Ice dancing			
Synchronized			

== Senior results ==
=== Men's singles ===
Rank	Name	Total points	SP		FS	
1	Peter Liebers	222.83	1	78.13	1	144.70
2	Paul Fentz	218.63	2	74.42	2	144.21
3	Franz Streubel	210.26	3	72.19	3	138.07
4	Anton Kempf	166.37	4	58.03	4	108.34
5	Fabian Piontek	153.39	5	49.93	5	103.46
6	Dave Kötting	128.09	6	38.50	6	89.59

=== Women's singles ===
Rank	Name	Total points	SP		FS	
1	Nathalie Weinzierl	168.26	1	63.66	1	104.60
2	Lea Johanna Dastich	139.87	2	46.05	2	93.82
3	Annika Hocke	135.44	3	45.86	3	89.58
4	Kristina Isaev	125.23	4	44.34	4	80.89
5	Alina Mayer	102.32	5	35.76	5	66.56

=== Pair skating ===
Rank	Name	Total points	SP		FS	
1	Mari Vartmann / Ruben Blommaert	180.90	1	61.22	1	119.68
WD	Minerva-Fabienne Hase / Nolan Seegert	WD	2	47.74	Withdrew from competition	

=== Ice dance ===
Rank	Name	Total points	SD		FD	
1	Kavita Lorenz / Joti Polizoakis	172.20	1	67.24	1	104.96
2	Katharina Müller / Tim Dieck	146.88	2	63.44	4	83.44
3	Shari Koch / Christian Nüchtern	143.94	3	59.84	3	84.10
4	Jennifer Urban / Benjamin Steffan	142.15	4	53.75	2	88.40

=== Synchronized skating ===
Rank	Name	Total points	SP		FS	
1	Team Berlin 1	165.97	1	56.80	1	109.17
2	Skating Graces	123.24	2	40.11	2	83.13
