= 2016 German Figure Skating Championships =

- Type: National championships
- Date: December 11 – 13, 2015
- Season: 2015–16
- Location: Essen
- Venue: Eissporthalle Essen West
- Previous: 2015 German Championships
- Next: 2017 German Championships

The 2016 German Figure Skating Championships (German: Deutsche Meisterschaften im Eiskunstlaufen 2016) was held on December 11–13, 2015 at the Eissporthalle Essen West in Essen. Skaters competed in the disciplines of men's singles, women's singles, pair skating, and ice dance at the senior, junior, and novice levels. The results of the national championships were among the criteria used to choose the German teams to the 2016 World Championships and 2016 European Championships.

== Medalists ==
=== Senior ===
Discipline	Gold	Silver	Bronze
Men	Franz Streubel	Paul Fentz	Niko Ulanovsky
Ladies	Lutricia Bock	Nathalie Weinzierl	Nicole Schott
Pairs	Aljona Savchenko / Bruno Massot	Mari Vartmann / Ruben Blommaert	Minerva-Fabienne Hase / Nolan Seegert
Ice dancing	Kavita Lorenz / Panagiotis Polizoakis	Katharina Müller / Tim Dieck	Aurelija Ippolito / Bennet Preiss

=== Junior ===
Discipline	Gold	Silver	Bronze
Men			
Ladies			
Pairs			
Ice dancing			

== Senior results ==
=== Men ===
Rank	Name	Total points	SP		FS	
1	Franz Streubel	216.22	2	70.04	1	146.18
2	Paul Fentz	206.92	1	71.94	2	134.98
3	Niko Ulanovsky	188.57	3	65.07	3	123.50
4	Alexander Bjelde	181.95	4	63.09	4	118.86
5	Anton Kempf	176.20	5	60.60	5	115.60
6	Martin Rappe	169.07	6	60.59	6	108.48
7	Marco Asam	140.17	7	46.69	7	93.48
8	Alexander Betke	128.32	8	42.32	8	86.00

=== Ladies ===
Rank	Name	Total points	SP		FS	
1	Lutricia Bock	164.94	1	59.32	2	105.62
2	Nathalie Weinzierl	163.11	3	54.64	1	108.47
3	Nicole Schott	156.89	2	56.32	3	100.57
4	Lea Johanna Dastich	147.53	4	48.54	4	98.99
5	Alina Mayer	98.16	5	32.86	5	65.30

=== Pairs ===
Rank	Name	Total points	SP		FS	
1	Aljona Savchenko / Bruno Massot	222.22	1	80.61	1	141.61
2	Mari Vartmann / Ruben Blommaert	179.10	2	67.09	2	112.01
3	Minerva-Fabienne Hase / Nolan Seegert	143.54	3	54.52	3	89.02

=== Ice dancing ===
Rank	Name	Total points	SD		FD	
1	Kavita Lorenz / Panagiotis Polizoakis	146.16	2	56.06	1	90.10
2	Katharina Müller / Tim Dieck	139.57	1	56.10	2	83.47
3	Aurelija Ippolito / Bennet Preiss	90.81	3	36.21	3	54.60
