= 2018 German Figure Skating Championships =

- Type: National Championship
- Date: December 14 – 16, 2017
- Season: 2017–18
- Location: Frankfurt
- Venue: Eissporthalle Frankfurt
- Previous: 2017 German Championships
- Next: 2019 German Championships

The 2018 German Figure Skating Championships (German: Deutsche Meisterschaften im Eiskunstlaufen 2018) was held on December 14–16, 2017 at the Eissporthalle Frankfurt in Frankfurt. Skaters competed in the disciplines of men's singles, women's singles, pair skating, ice dance, and synchronized skating at the senior, junior, and novice levels. The results of the national championships were among the criteria used to choose the German teams to the 2018 World Championships and 2018 European Championships.

== Medalists ==
=== Senior ===
Discipline	Gold	Silver	Bronze
Men	Paul Fentz	Peter Liebers	Catalin Dimitrescu
Ladies	Nicole Schott	Nathalie Weinzierl	Lea Johanna Dastich
Pairs	Aljona Savchenko / Bruno Massot	Minerva-Fabienne Hase / Nolan Seegert	Annika Hocke / Ruben Blommaert
Ice dance	Kavita Lorenz / Panagiotis Polizoakis	Katharina Müller / Tim Dieck	Shari Koch / Christian Nüchtern
Synchronized	Team Berlin 1	Skating Graces	No other competitors

=== Junior ===
Discipline	Gold	Silver	Bronze
Men			
Ladies			
Pairs			
Ice dance			
Synchronized			

== Senior results ==
=== Men's singles ===
Rank	Name	Total points	SP		FS	
1	Paul Fentz	231.60	1	74.59	1	157.01
2	Peter Liebers	207.59	2	60.18	2	147.41
3	Catalin Dimitrescu	173.42	3	58.89	3	114.53
4	Thomas Stoll	156.93	4	55.97	4	100.96
5	Fabian Piontek	148.06	5	53.46	5	94.60

=== Women's singles ===
Rank	Name	Total points	SP		FS	
1	Nicole Schott	177.86	1	59.20	1	118.66
2	Nathalie Weinzierl	166.45	2	57.70	2	108.75
3	Lea Johanna Dastich	162.42	3	55.59	3	106.83
4	Jasmin Lugert	123.15	4	43.75	4	79.40
5	Alissa Scheidt	110.72	5	38.47	6	72.25
6	Sarah Anderson	108.81	7	35.23	5	73.58
7	Alina Mayer-Virtanen	107.85	6	36.52	7	71.33
8	Sofie Barnova	101.24	8	35.05	8	66.19

=== Pair skating ===
Rank	Name	Total points	SP		FS	
1	Aljona Savchenko / Bruno Massot	229.38	1	76.29	1	153.09
2	Minerva-Fabienne Hase / Nolan Seegert	168.99	2	59.58	2	109.41
3	Annika Hocke / Ruben Blommaert	164.66	3	57.19	3	107.47

=== Ice dance ===
Rank	Name	Total points	SD		FD	
1	Kavita Lorenz / Panagiotis Polizoakis	165.07	1	63.65	1	101.42
2	Katharina Müller / Tim Dieck	158.66	2	61.29	2	97.37
3	Shari Koch / Christian Nüchtern	156.17	3	59.70	3	96.47
4	Jennifer Urban / Benjamin Steffan	136.33	4	53.97	4	82.36

=== Synchronized skating ===
Rank	Name	Total points	SP		FS	
1	Team Berlin 1	154.16	1	58.43	1	95.73
2	Skating Graces	122.69	2	44.95	2	77.74
