= 2016 CS Nebelhorn Trophy =

- Type: ISU Challenger Series
- Date: September 22 – 24
- Season: 2016–17
- Location: Oberstdorf
- Venue: Eissportzentrum Oberstdorf

Champions
- Men's singles: (Russia) Alexander Petrov
- Ladies' singles: (Japan) Mai Mihara
- Pairs: (Germany) Aliona Savchenko / Bruno Massot
- Ice dance: (Italy) Anna Cappellini / Luca Lanotte
- Previous: 2015 CS Nebelhorn Trophy
- Next: 2017 CS Nebelhorn Trophy

The 2016 CS Nebelhorn Trophy was a senior international figure skating competition held in September 2016 at the Eissportzentrum Oberstdorf. It was part of the 2016–17 ISU Challenger Series. Medals were awarded in the disciplines of men's singles, ladies' singles, pair skating, and ice dance.

== Entries ==
Country	Men	Ladies	Pairs	Ice dance
Australia		Brooklee Han		
Belarus				Viktoria Kavaliova / Yurii Bieliaiev
Belgium	Jorik Hendrickx	Loena Hendrickx		
Brazil		Isadora Williams		
Canada	Liam Firus	Gabrielle Daleman	Lubov Ilyushechkina / Dylan Moscovitch	Piper Gilles / Paul Poirier
Chinese Taipei	Meng Ju Lee			
Czech Republic		Elizaveta Ukolova		
Finland	Valtter Virtanen; Tomi Pulkkinen	Karoliina Luhtonen; Emmi Peltonen		
France				Lorenza Alessandrini / Pierre Souquet
Germany	Paul Fentz; Franz Streubel	Lutricia Bock	Minerva Fabienne Hase / Nolan Seegert; Aliona Savchenko / Bruno Massot; Mari Vartmann / Ruben Blommaert	Kavita Lorenz / Joti Polizoakis; Katharina Müller / Tim Dieck
Italy				Anna Cappellini / Luca Lanotte
Japan	Sei Kawahara	Mai Mihara		
Malaysia	Julian Zhi Jie Yee			
Russia	Artur Dmitriev Jr. Alexander Petrov	Serafima Sakhanovich; Elizaveta Tuktamysheva		
Slovakia	Marco Klepoch			
South Korea		Park So-youn		Yura Min / Alexander Gamelin
Switzerland		Jérômie Repond	Ioulia Chtchetinina / Noah Scherer; Alexandra Herbriková / Nicolas Roulet	
United Kingdom		Karly Robertson		Ekaterina Fedyushchenko / Lucas Kitteridge
United States	Timothy Dolensky; Grant Hochstein	Amber Glenn; Angela Wang	Ashley Cain / Timothy Leduc; Erika Smith / AJ Reiss	Madison Chock / Evan Bates; Elliana Pogrebinsky / Alex Benoit

Withdrew before starting orders drawn

- Men: Alexander Majorov (SWE), Nicola Todeschini (SUI), Alexander Bjelde (GER), Anton Kempf (GER)
- Ladies: Jenni Saarinen (FIN), Michaela-Lucie Hanzliková (CZE), Jelizaveta Leonova (EST), Simona Gospodinova (BUL), Angela Wang (USA)
- Pairs: Tarah Kayne / Daniel O'Shea (USA)
- Ice dance: Lilah Fear / Lewis Gibson (GBR), Elena Ilinykh / Ruslan Zhiganshin (RUS)

Added

- Ladies: Karoliina Luhtonen (FIN), Brooklee Han (AUS)
- Pairs: Ashley Cain / Timothy Leduc (USA)

== Results ==
=== Men ===
Rank	Name	Nation	Total points	SP		FS	
1	Alexander Petrov	Russia	232.21	1	75.13	1	157.08
2	Jorik Hendrickx	Belgium	223.04	5	71.90	2	151.14
3	Grant Hochstein	United States	217.25	2	75.00	3	142.25
4	Julian Zhi Jie Yee	Malaysia	212.27	4	72.59	5	139.68
5	Liam Firus	Canada	210.09	3	74.57	7	135.52
6	Artur Dmitriev Jr.	Russia	209.19	6	71.36	6	137.83
7	Timothy Dolensky	United States	207.49	7	67.76	4	139.73
8	Paul Fentz	Germany	199.20	8	65.63	8	133.57
9	Sei Kawahara	Japan	184.43	9	63.04	9	121.39
10	Franz Streubel	Germany	174.37	10	69.21	10	115.16
11	Meng Ju Lee	Chinese Taipei	128.19	11	40.92	11	87.27
12	Marco Klepoch	Slovakia	121.17	12	39.15	12	82.02

=== Ladies ===
Rank	Name	Nation	Total points	SP		FS	
1	Mai Mihara	Japan	189.03	2	63.11	1	125.92
2	Elizaveta Tuktamysheva	Russia	185.93	1	65.20	2	120.73
3	Gabrielle Daleman	Canada	175.40	3	60.15	3	115.25
4	Park So-youn	South Korea	161.95	5	55.71	4	106.24
5	Amber Glenn	United States	157.68	4	55.92	6	101.76
6	Serafima Sakhanovich	Russia	154.68	6	52.69	5	101.99
7	Loena Hendrickx	Belgium	139.43	10	45.36	7	94.07
8	Lutricia Bock	Germany	129.62	8	50.82	8	78.80
9	Karly Robertson	United Kingdom	126.79	7	51.11	11	75.68
10	Elizaveta Ukolova	Czech Republic	123.96	9	49.87	12	74.09
11	Brooklee Han	Australia	121.26	12	44.53	10	76.73
12	Karoliina Luhtonen	Finland	113.06	13	36.12	9	76.94
13	Jérômie Repond	Switzerland	94.35	14	31.65	13	62.70
WD	Isadora Williams	Brazil	N/A	11	45.31		
WD	Emmi Peltonen	Finland	N/A				

=== Pairs ===
Rank	Name	Nation	Total points	SP		FS	
1	Aliona Savchenko / Bruno Massot	Germany	203.04	1	74.24	1	128.80
2	Lubov Ilyushechkina / Dylan Moscovitch	Canada	184.40	2	65.98	2	118.42
3	Mari Vartmann / Ruben Blommaert	Germany	162.38	3	57.74	3	104.64
4	Ashley Cain / Timothy Leduc	United States	150.40	5	52.40	4	98.00
5	Erika Smith / AJ Reiss	United States	148.84	4	56.20	5	92.64
6	Minerva Fabienne Hase / Nolan Seegert	Germany	135.54	6	44.00	6	91.54
7	Ioulia Chtchetinina / Noah Scherer	Switzerland	109.00	7	36.96	8	72.04
8	Alexandra Herbriková / Nicolas Roulet	Switzerland	108.46	8	35.16	7	73.30

=== Ice dance ===
Rank	Name	Nation	Total points	SD		FD	
1	Anna Cappellini / Luca Lanotte	Italy	180.50	1	71.42	1	109.08
2	Madison Chock / Evan Bates	United States	179.18	2	70.78	2	108.40
3	Piper Gilles / Paul Poirier	Canada	176.84	3	70.32	3	106.52
4	Elliana Pogrebinsky / Alex Benoit	United States	155.20	4	63.06	4	92.14
5	Kavita Lorenz / Joti Polizoakis	Germany	139.94	5	59.18	6	80.76
6	Yura Min / Alexander Gamelin	South Korea	139.26	6	55.38	5	83.88
7	Lorenza Alessandrini / Pierre Souquet	France	131.78	8	51.22	7	80.56
8	Viktoria Kavaliova / Yurii Bieliaiev	Belarus	127.28	9	49.88	8	77.40
9	Katharina Müller / Tim Dieck	Germany	125.88	7	53.60	9	72.28
10	Ekaterina Fedyushchenko / Lucas Kitteridge	United Kingdom	110.90	10	42.26	10	68.64
