= 2015 CS Warsaw Cup =

2015 Warsaw Cup
- Type: ISU Challenger Series
- Date: 27 – 29 November 2015
- Season: 2015–16
- Location: Warsaw, Poland
- Venue: Torwar

Champions
- Men's singles: (Russia) Alexander Samarin
- Ladies' singles: (Russia) Elizaveta Tuktamysheva
- Pairs: (Germany) Aliona Savchenko / Bruno Massot
- Ice dance: (Italy) Charlène Guignard / Marco Fabbri
- Previous: 2014 Warsaw Cup
- Next: 2016 Warsaw Cup

The 2015 Warsaw Cup was a senior international figure skating competition held in November 2015 in Warsaw, Poland. It was part of the 2015–16 ISU Challenger Series. Medals were awarded in the disciplines of men's singles, ladies' singles, pair skating, and ice dancing.

== Entries ==
The preliminary entries were published on 5 November 2015.

Country	Men	Ladies	Pairs	Ice dancing
Armenia		Milena Danielyan; Anastasia Galustyan		
Austria		Kerstin Frank; Christina Grill		
Belarus			Tatiana Danilova / Mikalai Kamianchuk	Viktoria Kavaliova / Yurii Bieliaiev
Croatia			Lana Petranović / Michael Lueck	
Czech Republic		Aneta Janiczková		
Estonia		Helery Hälvin		
Finland		Juulia Turkkila		Cecilia Törn / Jussiville Partanen
Germany	Franz Streubel	Nicole Schott	Aliona Savchenko / Bruno Massot	Kavita Lorenz / Panagiotis Polizoakis
Italy	Ivan Righini; Matteo Rizzo; Marco Zandron		Nicole Della Monica / Matteo Guarise; Bianca Manacorda / Niccolò Macii; Valentina Marchei / Ondřej Hotárek	Charlène Guignard / Marco Fabbri
Kazakhstan	Abzal Rakimgaliev			
Lithuania		Aleksandra Golovkina; Elžbieta Kropa	Goda Butkutė / Nikita Ermolaev	Taylor Tran / Saulius Ambrulevičius
Norway	Sondre Oddvoll Bøe			Thea Rabe / Timothy Koleto
Philippines	Michael Christian Martinez			
Poland	Krzysztof Gała; Łukasz Kędzierski; Patrick Myzyk	Agnieszka Rejment		Natalia Kaliszek / Maksym Spodyriev
Russia	Zhan Bush; Alexander Samarin; Anton Shulepov	Serafima Sakhanovich; Elizaveta Tuktamysheva		Anastasia Safronova / Ilia Zimin
Slovakia	Marco Klepoch; Michael Neuman	Nina Letenayová; Nicole Rajičová		
South Korea				Yura Min / Alexander Gamelin
Spain			Marcelina Lech / Aritz Maestu	
Switzerland	Nicolas Dubois; Stéphane Walker	Laure Nicodet	Ioulia Chtchetinina / Noah Scherer; Alexandra Herbríková / Nicolas Roulet	
Ukraine	Yaroslav Paniot			

== Results ==
=== Men ===
Rank	Name	Nation	Total	SP		FS	
1	Alexander Samarin	Russia	225.27	2	76.44	1	148.83
2	Anton Shulepov	Russia	223.52	1	78.64	3	144.88
3	Zhan Bush	Russia	206.63	8	61.60	2	145.03
4	Michael Christian Martinez	Philippines	206.30	6	65.64	4	140.66
5	Matteo Rizzo	Italy	205.05	3	73.29	6	131.76
6	Ivan Righini	Italy	202.52	4	67.76	5	134.76
7	Franz Streubel	Germany	195.26	5	66.39	7	128.87
8	Yaroslav Paniot	Ukraine	180.63	7	63.60	8	117.03
9	Stéphane Walker	Switzerland	172.87	9	60.77	10	112.10
10	Sondre Oddvoll Bøe	Norway	168.42	10	56.04	9	112.38
11	Abzal Rakimgaliev	Kazakhstan	157.24	13	51.54	11	105.70
12	Michael Neuman	Slovakia	154.93	11	53.92	12	101.01
13	Krzysztof Gała	Poland	151.45	12	51.72	13	99.73
14	Nicolas Dubois	Switzerland	144.89	14	51.52	14	93.37
15	Łukasz Kędzierski	Poland	138.06	16	49.07	15	88.99
16	Marco Klepoch	Slovakia	138.06	15	49.19	16	88.87
17	Patrick Myzyk	Poland	129.94	18	45.45	17	84.49
18	Marco Zandron	Italy	123.12	17	48.26	18	74.86

=== Ladies ===
Rank	Name	Nation	Total	SP		FS	
1	Elizaveta Tuktamysheva	Russia	192.93	1	64.18	1	128.75
2	Serafima Sakhanovich	Russia	176.41	3	53.89	2	122.52
3	Anastasia Galustyan	Armenia	162.68	2	58.51	3	104.17
4	Nicole Schott	Germany	140.91	5	48.84	4	92.07
5	Nicole Rajičová	Slovakia	137.93	9	45.91	5	92.02
6	Juulia Turkkila	Finland	135.65	4	49.67	6	85.98
7	Aleksandra Golovkina	Lithuania	131.16	7	47.87	7	83.29
8	Helery Hälvin	Estonia	129.92	6	48.17	8	81.75
9	Kerstin Frank	Austria	121.79	8	47.24	9	74.55
10	Nina Letenayová	Slovakia	113.51	10	39.99	10	73.52
11	Laure Nicodet	Switzerland	107.04	12	35.81	11	71.23
12	Aneta Janiczková	Czech Republic	100.18	11	37.21	12	62.97
13	Agnieszka Rejment	Poland	97.71	13	34.76	13	62.95
14	Christina Grill	Austria	86.36	15	28.30	14	58.06
WD	Elžbieta Kropa	Lithuania		14	29.31		
WD	Milena Danielyan	Armenia					

=== Pairs ===
Rank	Name	Nation	Total	SP		FS	
1	Aliona Savchenko / Bruno Massot	Germany	209.60	1	76.30	1	133.30
2	Nicole Della Monica / Matteo Guarise	Italy	191.98	2	65.36	2	126.62
3	Goda Butkutė / Nikita Ermolaev	Lithuania	149.84	3	45.34	3	104.50
4	Tatiana Danilova / Mikalai Kamianchuk	Belarus	138.50	4	45.34	4	93.16
5	Bianca Manacorda / Niccolò Macii	Italy	121.00	5	41.22	5	79.78
6	Ioulia Chtchetinina / Noah Scherer	Switzerland	114.60	6	36.86	6	77.74
7	Alexandra Herbríková / Nicolas Roulet	Switzerland	109.94	7	36.10	7	73.84
8	Marcelina Lech / Aritz Maestu	Spain	101.86	8	32.30	8	69.56
9	Lana Petranović / Michael Lueck	Croatia	97.78	9	28.52	9	69.26
WD	Valentina Marchei / Ondřej Hotárek	Italy					

=== Ice dancing ===
Rank	Name	Nation	Total	SD		FD	
1	Charlène Guignard / Marco Fabbri	Italy	169.72	1	67.44	1	102.28
2	Natalia Kaliszek / Maksym Spodyriev	Poland	147.52	2	59.14	2	88.38
3	Cecilia Törn / Jussiville Partanen	Finland	136.92	3	55.58	4	81.34
4	Viktoria Kavaliova / Yurii Bieliaiev	Belarus	136.46	4	52.76	3	83.70
5	Kavita Lorenz / Panagiotis Polizoakis	Germany	133.26	5	52.72	5	80.54
6	Taylor Tran / Saulius Ambrulevičius	Lithuania	123.72	6	50.16	6	73.56
7	Yura Min / Alexander Gamelin	South Korea	119.84	7	46.50	7	73.34
8	Thea Rabe / Timothy Koleto	Norway	107.80	8	42.66	8	65.14
9	Anastasia Safronova / Ilia Zimin	Russia	99.44	9	37.74	9	61.70
