= 2015 CS Nebelhorn Trophy =

2015 Nebelhorn Trophy
- Type: ISU Challenger Series
- Date: September 24 – 26
- Season: 2015–16
- Location: Oberstdorf
- Venue: Eislaufzentrum Oberstdorf

Champions
- Men's singles: (Canada) Elladj Baldé
- Ladies' singles: (Canada) Kaetlyn Osmond
- Pairs: (Russia) Tatiana Volosozhar / Maxim Trankov
- Ice dance: (United States) Madison Chock / Evan Bates
- Previous: 2014 CS Nebelhorn Trophy
- Next: 2016 CS Nebelhorn Trophy

The 2015 Nebelhorn Trophy was a senior international figure skating competition in the 2015–16 season. Part of the 2015–16 ISU Challenger Series, it was held on September 24–26, 2015 at the Eislaufzentrum Oberstdorf. Medals were awarded in men's and ladies' singles, pair skating, and ice dance.

== Entries ==
Country	Men	Ladies	Pairs	Ice dance
Australia	Andrew Dodds	Kailani Craine; Brooklee Han	Paris Stephens / Matthew Dodds	
Belgium	Jorik Hendrickx			
Canada	Elladj Baldé	Alaine Chartrand; Kaetlyn Osmond	Julianne Séguin / Charlie Bilodeau	Lauren Collins / Shane Firus; Alexandra Paul / Mitchell Islam
Czech Republic	Michal Březina	Elizaveta Ukolova		
Finland	Valtter Virtanen	Karoliina Luhtonen; Juulia Turkkila		
France	Florent Amodio		Vanessa James / Morgan Ciprès	Lorenza Alessandrini / Pierre Souquet
Germany	Alexander Bjelde; Peter Liebers; Franz Streubel	Lea Johanna Dastich; Nathalie Weinzierl	Minerva Fabienne Hase / Nolan Seegert; Mari Vartmann / Ruben Blommaert	Kavita Lorenz / Panagiotis Polizoakis; Katharina Müller / Tim Dieck; Jennifer Urban / Sevan Lerche
Ireland	Conor Stakelum			
Japan		Mariko Kihara		
Malaysia	Julian Zhi Jie Yee			
Netherlands		Niki Wories		
Poland				Natalia Kaliszek / Maksym Spodyriev
Russia	Konstantin Menshov	Alena Leonova	Tatiana Volosozhar / Maxim Trankov	
Sweden	Marcus Björk			
Switzerland		Matilde Gianocca; Tanja Odermatt		Katarina Paice / Yuri Eremenko
Turkey				Alisa Agafonova / Alper Uçar
United Kingdom	Phillip Harris		Amani Fancy / Christopher Boyadji	
United States	Max Aaron; Grant Hochstein	Courtney Hicks; Mirai Nagasu	Alexa Scimeca / Chris Knierim	Anastasia Cannuscio / Colin McManus; Madison Chock / Evan Bates

== Results ==
=== Men ===
Rank	Name	Nation	Total points	SP		FS	
1	Elladj Baldé	Canada	242.36	2	78.56	1	163.80
2	Max Aaron	United States	222.94	1	83.46	3	139.48
3	Konstantin Menshov	Russia	218.14	6	70.30	2	147.84
4	Florent Amodio	France	207.96	7	69.74	4	138.22
5	Peter Liebers	Germany	204.41	5	73.33	5	131.08
6	Michal Březina	Czech Republic	203.61	3	74.12	6	129.49
7	Grant Hochstein	United States	194.88	8	69.60	8	125.28
8	Jorik Hendrickx	Belgium	193.72	4	73.88	9	119.84
9	Julian Zhi Jie Yee	Malaysia	191.27	9	65.89	7	125.38
10	Phillip Harris	United Kingdom	172.62	10	65.76	12	106.86
11	Franz Streubel	Germany	172.12	13	58.77	10	113.35
12	Valtter Virtanen	Finland	168.88	11	60.37	11	108.51
13	Marcus Björk	Sweden	146.12	16	45.75	13	100.37
14	Andrew Dodds	Australia	139.62	14	53.89	14	85.73
15	Conor Stakelum	Ireland	112.47	15	47.93	15	64.54
–	Alexander Bjelde	Germany	withdrew	12	59.19	withdrew	

=== Ladies ===
Rank	Name	Nation	Total points	SP		FS	
1	Kaetlyn Osmond	Canada	179.41	1	59.67	1	119.74
2	Alena Leonova	Russia	165.61	4	56.41	3	109.20
3	Courtney Hicks	United States	162.85	3	57.65	4	105.20
4	Alaine Chartrand	Canada	161.35	2	58.73	5	102.62
5	Mirai Nagasu	United States	159.67	11	48.09	2	111.58
6	Mariko Kihara	Japan	155.65	5	54.72	6	100.93
7	Brooklee Han	Australia	151.90	6	51.92	7	99.98
8	Kailani Craine	Australia	144.58	8	50.42	8	94.16
9	Nathalie Weinzierl	Germany	138.65	10	48.22	9	90.43
10	Juulia Turkkila	Finland	138.53	7	51.13	10	87.40
11	Karoliina Luhtonen	Finland	125.00	9	48.59	13	76.41
12	Tanja Odermatt	Switzerland	121.77	12	45.20	12	76.57
13	Elizaveta Ukolova	Czech Republic	113.15	16	30.21	11	82.94
14	Lea Johanna Dastich	Germany	108.04	13	43.80	14	64.24
15	Niki Wories	Netherlands	103.60	14	41.07	16	62.53
16	Matilde Gianocca	Switzerland	99.43	15	35.87	15	63.56

=== Pairs ===
Rank	Name	Nation	Total points	SP		FS	
1	Tatiana Volosozhar / Maxim Trankov	Russia	202.79	1	64.87	1	137.92
2	Alexa Scimeca / Chris Knierim	United States	179.56	4	58.00	2	121.56
3	Vanessa James / Morgan Ciprès	France	172.18	3	58.34	3	113.84
4	Mari Vartmann / Ruben Blommaert	Germany	166.50	2	61.10	4	105.40
5	Julianne Séguin / Charlie Bilodeau	Canada	150.32	5	57.81	5	92.51
6	Minerva Fabienne Hase / Nolan Seegert	Germany	130.06	6	50.29	6	79.77
7	Paris Stephens / Matthew Dodds	Australia	86.48	8	27.28	7	59.20
–	Amani Fancy / Christopher Boyadji	United Kingdom	withdrew	7	48.75	withdrew	

=== Ice dance ===
Rank	Name	Nation	Total points	SD		FD	
1	Madison Chock / Evan Bates	United States	169.50	1	67.74	1	101.76
2	Alexandra Paul / Mitchell Islam	Canada	148.12	2	60.52	2	87.60
3	Anastasia Cannuscio / Colin McManus	United States	137.38	4	54.34	4	83.04
4	Kavita Lorenz / Panagiotis Polizoakis	Germany	136.02	8	51.34	3	84.68
5	Lauren Collins / Shane Firus	Canada	132.42	7	52.66	5	79.76
6	Alisa Agafonova / Alper Uçar	Turkey	132.38	3	55.26	6	77.12
7	Natalia Kaliszek / Maksym Spodyriev	Poland	131.06	5	54.28	7	76.78
8	Lorenza Alessandrini / Pierre Souquet	France	124.84	6	53.42	9	71.42
9	Jennifer Urban / Sevan Lerche	Germany	116.60	10	42.38	8	74.22
10	Katharina Müller / Tim Dieck	Germany	110.68	9	45.68	10	65.00
11	Katarina Paice / Yuri Eremenko	Switzerland	92.32	11	35.96	11	56.36
