= Grant Hochstein =

American figure skater (born 1990)

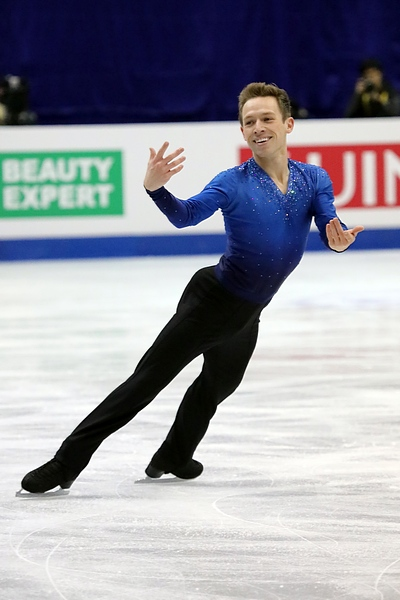
- Hochstein in 2018

Personal information
- Born: July 16, 1990 (age 36) Detroit, Michigan, U.S.
- Home town: Anaheim, California, U.S.
- Height: 5 ft 5 in (1.65 m)

Figure skating career
- Country: United States
- Discipline: Men's singles
- Began skating: 1999
- Retired: August 3, 2018

Grant Hochstein (born July 16, 1990) is an American former figure skater. He is the 2016 CS Nebelhorn Trophy bronze medalist and a two-time U.S. national pewter medalist (2016, 2017). He has finished in the top ten at three ISU Championships, including the 2016 World Championships.

== Personal life ==
Hochstein was born on July 16, 1990, in Warren, Michigan. After high school, he began studying history at Wayne State University in Detroit, but paused his studies in 2012 when he moved to California. He works as a coach in addition to competing.

On April 5, 2016, he announced his engagement to fellow figure skater Caroline Zhang. They were married on August 18, 2018. On April 19, 2021, Zhang gave birth to a daughter.

== Career ==
Hochstein won the pewter medal (fourth place) on the junior level at the 2009 U.S. Championships.

His ISU Junior Grand Prix debut came in the 2009–2010 season. Hochstein won silver in Budapest and placed fourth in Dresden, earning qualification to the ISU Junior Grand Prix Final, where he placed 5th. After finishing 7th on the senior level at the 2010 U.S. Championships, he was assigned to the 2010 World Junior Championships in The Hague, Netherlands. He placed first in the short program, 7th in the free skate, and 5th overall.

In 2010–2011, Hochstein was invited to the 2010 Skate Canada International and finished 10th in his first Grand Prix appearance. He was 12th at the 2011 and 2012 U.S. Championships. Peter Oppegard and Karen Kwan-Oppegard became his coaches in 2012, after Hochstein's move to California. He placed 15th at the 2013 U.S. Championships, 11th in 2014, and 9th in 2015.

In the 2015–2016 season, Hochstein was invited to two Grand Prix events, the 2015 Cup of China and 2015 NHK Trophy, and finished fourth at both. At the 2016 U.S. Championships, he was awarded the pewter medal after placing 6th in the short program, 4th in the free skate, and 4th overall. After the event, he was named in the U.S. team to the 2016 Four Continents, and a week later, he was added to the World Championships, replacing the injured Nathan Chen. Ranked 6th in the short and 10th in the free, Hochstein finished 8th overall at Four Continents in Taipei. At Worlds in Boston, he placed 16th in the short, 9th in the free, and 10th overall.

On August 3, 2018, U.S. Figure Skating announced Hochstein's retirement from competitive skating.

== Programs ==
Season	Short program	Free skating	Exhibition
2017–2018	Your Song (from Moulin Rouge! soundtrack)	The Phantom of the Opera by Andrew Lloyd Webber	
2016–2017	Due Tramonti by Ludovico Einaudi; Rhapsody in Blue performed by Duke Ellington choreo. by Peter Oppegard	Pagliacci by Ruggero Leoncavallo choreo. by Peter Oppegard	
2015–2016	Due Tramonti by Ludovico Einaudi	Les Misérables by Claude-Michel Schönberg	The Time of My Life by David Cook; Unconditionally by Katy Perry performed by The George Twins
2014–2015	O Fortuna (from Carmina Burana) by Carl Orff choreo. by Karen Kwan	Don Quixote by Ludwig Minkus choreo. by Peter Oppegard	
2013–2014	La califfa by Ennio Morricone	Trio élégiaque No. 2; Piano Concerto No. 3 by Sergei Rachmaninoff; Dumky trio by Antonín Dvořák choreo. by Karen Kwan	
2012–2013	La califfa by Ennio Morricone	King Arthur by Hans Zimmer; Troy by James Horner	
2011–2012	Claire de Lune by Claude Debussy	The Mission by Ennio Morricone	
2010–2011	Suite No. 3 by Jules Massenet; Hérodiade by Jules Massenet, performed by the New Zealand Symphony Orchestra	Adagio of Spartacus and Phrygia by Aram Khachaturian	
2009–2010	The Sleeping Beauty by Pyotr Tchaikovsky	Romeo and Juliet by Pyotr Tchaikovsky	
2008–2009	Seville (from Mission: Impossible 2) by Hans Zimmer	Rhapsody on a Theme of Paganini by Sergei Rachmaninoff	
2007–2008	Europa; Black Magic Woman by Santana	Rhapsody on a Theme of Paganini by Sergei Rachmaninoff	
2006–2007	Casablanca by Max Steiner	Henry V by Patrick Doyle	

== Competitive highlights ==
- GP – Event of the ISU Grand Prix Series
- JGP – Event of the ISU Junior Grand Prix Series
- CS – Event of the ISU Challenger Series

Competition placements at senior level
Season	2009–10	2010–11	2011–12	2012–13	2013–14	2014–15	2015–16	2016–17	2017–18
World Championships							10th		
Four Continents Championships							8th	9h	11th
U.S. Championships	7th	12th	12th	15th	11th	9th	4th	4th	5th
GP Cup of China							4th		9th
GP NHK Trophy							4th	11th	
GP Rostelecom Cup									11th
GP Skate Canada		10th						11th	
CS Golden Spin of Zagreb						4th			
CS Lombardia Trophy						4th		5th	
CS Nebelhorn Trophy							7th	3rd	
CS Ondrej Nepela Trophy			5th						4th
Finlandia Trophy		4th							
U.S. Classic					4th				

Competition placements at junior level
Season	2006–07	2007–08	2008–09	2009–10
World Junior Championships				5th
Junior Grand Prix Final				5th
U.S. Championships	12th	11th	4th	
JGP Germany				4th
JGP Hungary				2nd
Gardena Spring Trophy		1st		

== Detailed results ==
ISU personal best scores in the +3/-3 GOE System
Segment	Type	Score	Event
Total	TSS	237.25	2016 World Championships
Short program	TSS	81.94	2017 Four Continents Championships
Short program	TES	42.93	2017 CS Ondrej Nepela Trophy
Short program	PCS	39.60	2017 Four Continents Championships
Free skating	TSS	162.44	2016 World Championships
Free skating	TES	85.81	2015 NHK Trophy
Free skating	PCS	79.02	2017 Four Continents Championships

- At national events in the United States, pewter medals are awarded for fourth place.

=== Senior level ===
Results in the 2009–10 season
Date	Event	SP		FS		Total	
Date	Event	P	Score	P	Score	P	Score
Jan 14–24, 2010	(United States) 2010 U.S. Championships	8	65.55	7	127.18	7	192.73

Results in the 2010–11 season
Date	Event	SP		FS		Total	
Date	Event	P	Score	P	Score	P	Score
Oct 8–10, 2010	(Finland) 2010 Finlandia Trophy	6	56.90	2	126.61	4	183.51
Oct 28–31, 2010	2010 Skate Canada International	12	56.98	10	124.67	10	181.65
Jan 22–30, 2011	(United States) 2011 U.S. Championships	10	65.76	13	117.61	12	183.37

Results in the 2011–12 season
Date	Event	SP		FS		Total	
Date	Event	P	Score	P	Score	P	Score
Sep 28 – Oct 3, 2011	(Slovakia) 2011 Ondrej Nepela Memorial	2	69.77	7	119.81	5	189.58
Jan 22–29, 2012	(United States) 2012 U.S. Championships	10	67.89	11	138.74	12	206.23

Results in the 2012–13 season
Date	Event	SP		FS		Total	
Date	Event	P	Score	P	Score	P	Score
Jan 19–27, 2013	(United States) 2013 U.S. Championships	11	65.68	17	122.89	18	188.57

Results in the 2013–14 season
Date	Event	SP		FS		Total	
Date	Event	P	Score	P	Score	P	Score
Sep 12–14, 2013	(United States) 2013 U.S. International Classic	4	63.29	4	128.62	4	191.91
Jan 5–12, 2014	(United States) 2014 U.S. Championships	10	64.62	12	133.88	11	198.50

Results in the 2014–15 season
Date	Event	SP		FS		Total	
Date	Event	P	Score	P	Score	P	Score
Sep 18–21, 2014	(Italy) 2014 CS Lombardia Trophy	3	72.92	6	131.45	4	204.37
Dec 4–7, 2014	(Croatia) 2014 CS Golden Spin of Zagreb	6	69.69	3	150.13	4	219.82
Jan 18–25, 2015	(United States) 2015 U.S. Championships	9	75.70	9	184.58	9	230.28

Results in the 2015–16 season
Date	Event	SP		FS		Total	
Date	Event	P	Score	P	Score	P	Score
Sep 24–26, 2015	(Germany) 2015 CS Nebelhorn Trophy	8	69.60	8	125.28	7	194.88
Nov 6–8, 2015	2015 Cup of China	5	74.27	4	148.47	4	222.74
Nov 27–29, 2015	(Japan) 2015 NHK Trophy	5	74.30	4	161.33	4	235.63
Jan 16–24, 2016	(United States) 2016 U.S. Championships	6	79.26	4	173.58	4	252.84
Feb 16–21, 2016	(Taiwan) 2016 Four Continents Championships	6	75.79	10	140.55	8	216.34
Mar 28 – Apr 3, 2016	(United States) 2016 World Championships	16	74.81	9	162.44	10	237.25

Results in the 2016–17 season
Date	Event	SP		FS		Total	
Date	Event	P	Score	P	Score	P	Score
Sep 8–11, 2016	(Italy) 2016 CS Lombardia Trophy	5	64.95	3	133.82	5	198.77
Sep 22–24, 2016	(Germany) 2016 CS Nebelhorn Trophy	2	75.00	3	142.25	3	217.25
Oct 28–30, 2016	2016 Skate Canada International	12	60.20	8	144.49	11	204.69
Nov 25–27, 2016	(Japan) 2016 NHK Trophy	11	68.31	10	123.09	11	191.40
Jan 14–22, 2017	(United States) 2017 U.S. Championships	5	79.10	4	169.21	4	248.31
Feb 14–19, 2017	(South Korea) 2017 Four Continents Championships	7	81.94	9	153.78	9	235.72

Results in the 2017–18 season
Date	Event	SP		FS		Total	
Date	Event	P	Score	P	Score	P	Score
Sep 21–23, 2017	(Slovakia) 2017 CS Ondrej Nepela Trophy	2	79.98	6	137.54	4	217.52
Oct 20–22, 2017	(Russia) 2017 Rostelecom Cup	11	67.56	10	138.53	11	206.39
Nov 3–5, 2017	2017 Cup of China	7	80.55	9	135.89	9	216.44
Dec 29, 2017 – Jan 8, 2018	(United States) 2018 U.S. Championships	4	92.18	5	163.13	5	255.31
Jan 22–28, 2018	(Taiwan) 2018 Four Continents Championships	15	70.80	9	155.59	11	226.39

=== Junior level ===
Results in the 2006–07 season
Date	Event	SP		FS		Total	
Date	Event	P	Score	P	Score	P	Score
Jan 21–28, 2007	(United States) 2007 U.S. Championships (Junior)	11	46.26	11	94.25	12	140.51

Results in the 2007–08 season
Date	Event	SP		FS		Total	
Date	Event	P	Score	P	Score	P	Score
Jan 20–27, 2008	(United States) 2008 U.S. Championships (Junior)	8	53.84	11	108.28	11	162.12
Mar 27–31, 2008	(Italy) 2008 Gardena Spring Trophy	1	56.27	2	95.38	1	151.65

Results in the 2008–09 season
Date	Event	SP		FS		Total	
Date	Event	P	Score	P	Score	P	Score
Jan 18–25, 2009	(United States) 2009 U.S. Championships (Junior)	9	51.24	4	110.91	4	162.15

Results in the 2009–10 season
Date	Event	SP		FS		Total	
Date	Event	P	Score	P	Score	P	Score
Aug 26–29, 2009	2009 JGP Hungary	1	63.38	2	115.65	2	179.03
Sep 30 – Oct 3, 2009	2009 JGP Germany	2	60.64	5	109.21	4	169.85
Dec 2–6, 2009	(Japan) 2009–10 JGP Final	4	66.45	5	121.47	5	187.92
Mar 9–13, 2010	(Netherlands) 2010 World Junior Championships	1	71.35	7	122.95	5	194.30
