= Ruben Blommaert =

Belgian-born German pair skater

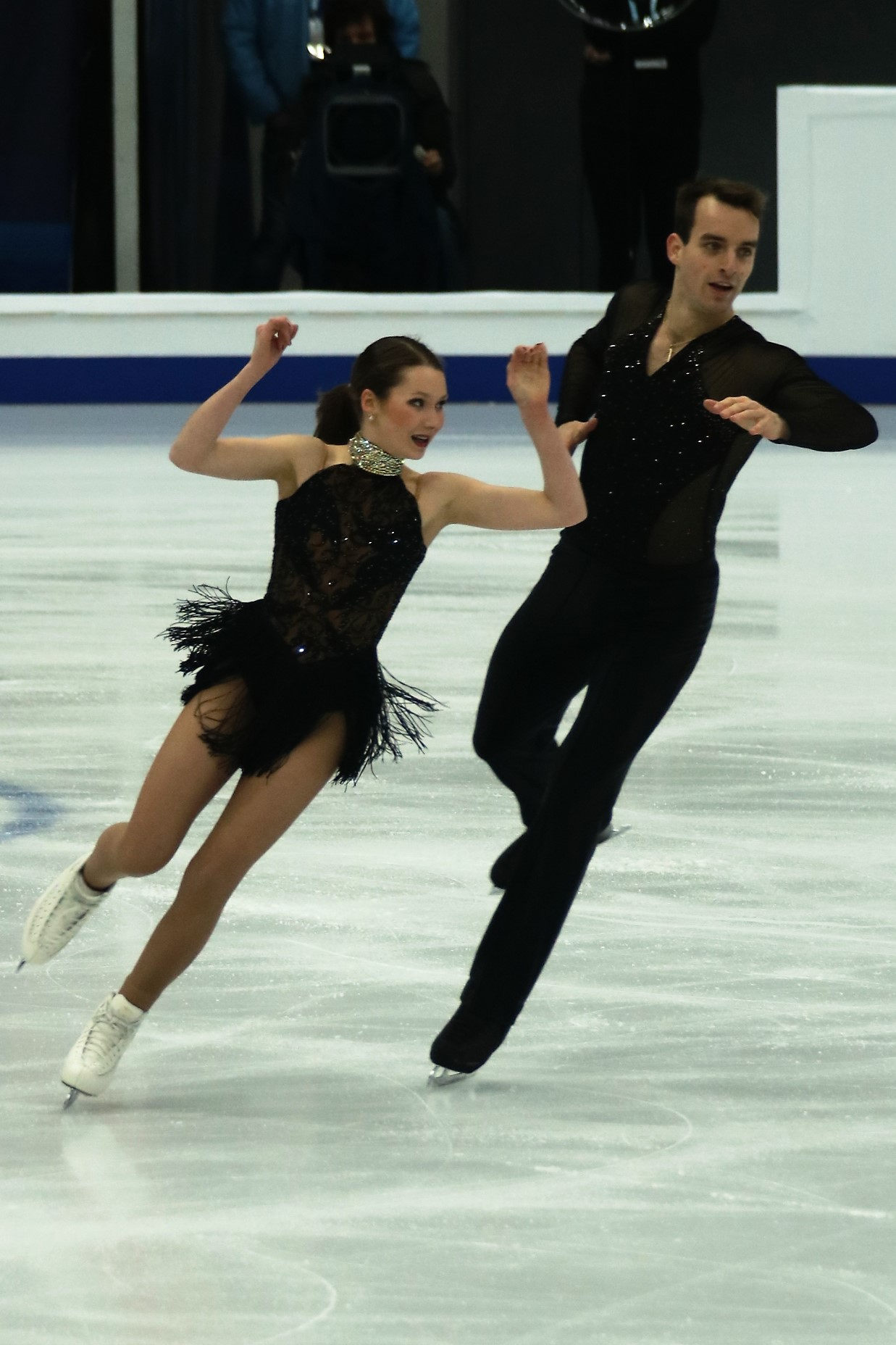
- Annika Hocke and Ruben Blommaert at the 2018 European Championships

Personal information
- Born: 5 March 1992 (age 34) Bruges, Belgium
- Home town: Oberstdorf, Germany
- Height: 1.80 m (5 ft 11 in)

Figure skating career
- Country: Germany (2011–23); Belgium (2006–10)
- Discipline: Pair skating (since 2011); Men's singles (2006–10)
- Partner: Alisa Efimova (2021–23); Elena Pavlova (2019–20); Annika Hocke (2017–19); Mari Vartmann (2015–17); Annabelle Prölß (2011–15)
- Began skating: 1998
- Retired: 2023

Medal record
Representing Germany
German Championships
Gold medal – first place	2013 Hamburg	Pairs
Gold medal – first place	2017 Berlin	Pairs
Silver medal – second place	2016 Essen	Pairs
Silver medal – second place	2019 Stuttgart	Pairs
Silver medal – second place	2022 Neuss	Pairs
Bronze medal – third place	2018 Frankfurt	Pairs
Representing Belgium
Belgian Championships
Silver medal – second place	2010 Liège	Singles

Ruben Blommaert (born 5 March 1992) is a retired Belgian-born German pair skater. With his skating partner, Alisa Efimova, he is the 2022 Grand Prix of Espoo silver medalist.

He also holds Belgian citizenship and competed for Belgium in single skating until 2010. Blommaert began representing Germany after teaming up with Annabelle Prölß to compete in pairs. They won the 2013 Cup of Nice and the 2013 German national title. He and his next partner, Mari Vartmann, won four ISU Challenger Series medals and the 2015 Cup of Nice. With Annika Hocke, Blommaert won silver medals at the 2017 CS Minsk-Arena Ice Star and 2017 International Cup of Nice and competed at the 2018 Winter Olympics. He competed for one season with Elena Pavlova.

== Personal life ==
Ruben Blommaert was born on 5 March 1992 in Bruges, Belgium. He became a German citizen on 1 July 2014 while retaining his Belgian citizenship. He has a twin brother, Sander, who dances with the Royal Ballet in London.

== Career ==
Blommaert began learning to skate in 1998. He competed for Belgium in single skating until 2010, appearing at the European Championships (finishing twenty-fifth in 2008 and 2009) and the Junior World Championships (finishing thirty-eighth in 2008 and twenty-eighth in 2009).

=== Partnership with Prölß ===
Blommaert teamed up with Annabelle Prölß in October 2011. They won the junior pairs title at the 2012 German Junior Championships.

In 2012–13, Prölß/Blommaert made their Junior Grand Prix debut in Lake Placid, finishing 6th, and then placed 4th in Germany. They won gold medals in the junior events at the 2013 Ice Challenge and 2013 Bavarian Open. Prölß/Blommaert won gold in their senior national debut at the 2013 German Championships. They finished 7th at the 2013 World Junior Championships.

In 2013–14, Prölß/Blommaert debuted on the senior international level. After finishing 4th at their first two events, they took gold at the International Cup of Nice. They received their first senior Grand Prix assignment, the 2013 Trophée Éric Bompard, after France's Daria Popova / Bruno Massot withdrew, finishing seveneth. They then closed their season with a silver medal at the 2014 International Challenge Cup.

In 2014–15, Prölß/Blommaert placed seventh at 2014 Skate America and sixth at the 2014 Rostelecom Cup. The pair soon parted ways after that.

=== Partnership with Vartmann ===
In the 2015–16 season, Blommaert started skating with Mari Vartmann. They won the 2015 Cup of Nice. At the 2016 Europeans, they placed 4th in the short program, 8th in the free program and 8th overall.

Vartmann and Blommaert started the 2016–17 season on the Challenger Series, winning bronze at both Nebelhorn Trophy and Finlandia Trophy. On 10 January 2017, the Deutsche Eislauf-Union announced that the two had parted ways.

=== Partnership with Hocke ===
Blommaert and Annika Hocke announced their partnership on 9 February 2017. They competed at the 2018 Winter Olympics in Pyeongchang, South Korea, as well as at the 2018 and 2019 World Championships, before dissolving their partnership.

=== Partnership with Pavlova ===
Blommaert announced in July 2019 that he had formed a new partnership with Russian pair skater Elena Pavlova. Due to Pavlova's visa issues, they indicated they would initially have to split time training between Russia and Germany. The pair split after one season.

=== Partnership with Efimova ===
Blommaert formed a new partnership with Alisa Efimova, who had previously competed with Alexander Korovin for Russia. They placed 2nd at the 2022 German Championships but were not allowed compete internationally until Efimova had been released by the Russian federation. They had their international debut at the 2022 Nebelhorn Trophy, where they placed second.

Competing on the Grand Prix series, Efimova/Bloomaert competed at 2022 Skate Canada International, however, after a hard fall on a throw in the short program, Efimova bruised her thigh and the pair withdrew from the event before the free skate. Going on to compete at the 2022 Grand Prix of Espoo, Efimova/Bloomaert won the silver medal behind Rebecca Ghilardi / Filippo Ambrosini of Italy. At the 2022 CS Golden Spin of Zagreb, Efimova/Bloomaert finished fifth.

The pair didn't compete at the 2023 German Championships due to Bloomaert coming down with a high fever a couple of days before the event.

Regardless, they were still selected to compete at the 2023 European Championships in Espoo, Finland, Efimova/Bloomaert placed third in the short program but fifth in the free skate and dropped to fifth place overall.

Going on to compete at the 2023 World Championships in Saitama, Japan, Efimova/Bloomaert placed seventh in the short program and tenth in the free skate, finishing in tenth place overall.

Bloomaert retired from competitive figure skating following the season, citing a lack of funding from the German Skating Union as one of the main reasons.

== Programs ==
=== Pair skating with Alisa Efimova (for Germany) ===
Season	Short program	Free skating	Exhibition
2022–23	Piano Sonata No. 14 by Ludwig van Beethoven performed by Arthur Rubinstein; Moonlight Sonata (Epic Trailer Version) performed by Hidden Citizen choreo. by Benjamin Steffan, Rostislav Sinicyn	Private Investigations by Dire Straits & Mark Knopfler; Sold My Soul by Two Wooden Stones choreo. by Benjamin Steffan, Rostislav Sinicyn	The Danger Zone by Ray Charles; Hit the Road Jack by Ray Charles performed by The Overtones ft. Beverley Knight

=== Pair skating with Elena Pavlova (for Germany) ===
Season	Short program	Free skating
2019–20	Bloodstream by Tokio Myers	Unsteady by X Ambassadors

=== Pair skating with Annika Hocke (for Germany) ===
Season	Short program	Free skating
2018–19	Malagueña by Ernesto Lecuona performed by Stanley Black & His Orchestra	Land of All by Woodkid
2017–18	Big Spender Cy Coleman, Dorothy Fields	Romeo & Juliet by Abel Korzeniowski

=== Pair skating with Mari Vartmann (for Germany) ===
Season	Short program	Free skating	Exhibition
2016–17	They Don't Care About Us by Michael Jackson	Second Law by Muse	I Put a Spell on You by Nina Simone
2015–16	Stranger in Paradise (based on Polovtsian Dances by Alexander Borodin) performed by Sarah Brightman choreo. by Mark Pillay	West Side Story by Leonard Bernstein choreo. by Mark Pillay	I Put a Spell on You by Nina Simone

=== Pair skating with Annabelle Prölß (for Germany) ===
Season	Short program	Free skating	Exhibition
2014–2015	O mio babbino caro (from Gianni Schicchi) by Giacomo Puccini choreo. by Rostislav Sinicyn	The Artist by Ludovic Bource choreo. by Lori Nichol	
2013–2014	O mio babbino caro (from Gianni Schicchi) by Giacomo Puccini choreo. by Rostislav Sinicyn	Pirates of the Caribbean by Hans Zimmer, Klaus Badelt	Maria (from West Side Story) by Leonard Bernstein, Stephen Sondheim
2012–2013	Italian Fantasia performed by Orchestra Mantovani	Robin Hood by Marc Streitenfeld	Beauty and the Beast by Alan Menken, Howard Ashman performed by Celine Dion and Peabo Bryson

=== Single skating (for Belgium) ===
Season	Short program	Free skating
2009–2010	Bolero (from Moulin Rouge!)	Henry V by Patrick Doyle
2008–2009	Reel Around the Sun (from Riverdance) by Bill Whelan	Blood Diamond by James Newton Howard
2007–2008	Moonlight Sonata by Ludwig van Beethoven (modern arrangement)	Soundtracks by Ennio Morricone
2006–2007	Fire by Buddha Bar	Guerilleros by Maxime Rodriguez

== Competitive highlights ==
- GP – Event of the ISU Grand Prix Series
- JGP – Event of the ISU Junior Grand Prix Series
- CS – Event of the ISU Challenger Series
- WD – Withdrew from competition

=== Pair skating with Alisa Efimova (for Germany) ===
Competition placements at senior level
Season	2021–22	2022–23
World Championships		10th
European Championships		4th
German Championships	2nd	
GP Finland		2nd
GP Skate Canada		WD
CS Finlandia Trophy		2nd
CS Golden Spin of Zagreb		5th
CS Nebelhorn Trophy		2nd

=== Pair skating with Elena Pavlova (for Germany) ===
Competition placements at senior level
Season	2019–20
CS Golden Spin of Zagreb	10th
CS Warsaw Cup	5th
Volvo Open Cup	4th

=== Pair skating with Annika Hocke (for Germany) ===
Competition placements at senior level
Season	2017–18	2018–19
Winter Olympics	16th	
World Championships	13th	14th
European Championships	8th	
German Championships	3rd	2nd
GP Skate America		7th
CS Golden Spin of Zagreb		6th
CS Ice Star	2nd	
CS Nebelhorn Trophy	5th	
CS Warsaw Cup	4th	
Bavarian Open		2nd
Challenge Cup		3rd
Cup of Nice	2nd	

=== Pair skating with Mari Vartmann (for Germany) ===
Competition placements at senior level
Season	2015–16	2016–17
European Championships	8th	
German Championships	2nd	1st
GP Cup of China	6th	7th
GP NHK Trophy		5th
CS Finlandia Trophy		3rd
CS Ice Challenge	2nd	
CS Nebelhorn Trophy	4th	3rd
CS Tallinn Trophy	2nd	
Cup of Nice	1st	

=== Pair skating with Annabelle Prölß (for Germany) ===
Competition placements at senior level
Season	2012–13	2013–14	2014–15
German Championships	1st		
GP Rostelecom Cup			6th
GP Skate America			7th
GP Trophée Éric Bompard		7th	
Challenge Cup		2nd	
Cup of Nice		1st	
Lombardia Trophy		4th	
Nebelhorn Trophy		4th	

Competition placements at junior level
Season	2011–12	2012–13
World Junior Championships		7th
German Championships	1st	
JGP Germany		4th
JGP United States		6th
Bavarian Open		1st
Ice Challenge		1st
NRW Trophy		1st
Warsaw Cup		2nd

=== Single skating (for Belgium) ===
Competition placements at senior level
Season	2007–08	2008–09	2009–10
European Championships	25th	25th	
Belgian Championships			2nd
Challenge Cup		WD	
Merano Cup			19th
Triglav Trophy			12th

Competition placements at junior level
Season	2006–07	2007–08	2008–09	2009–10
World Junior Championships		38th	28th	
Belgian Championships	1st	1st	2nd	
JGP Bulgaria		17th		
JGP Great Britain		17th	10th	
JGP Italy			11th	
JGP Netherlands	24th			
JGP United States				16th
Challenge Cup		10th		
European Youth Olympic Festival	13th			
Warsaw Cup			2nd	

== Detailed results ==
=== Pair skating with Alisa Efimova (for Germany) ===
2022–2023 season
Date	Event	SP	FS	Total
March 22–26, 2023	2023 World Championships	7; 65.23	10; 119.23	10; 184.46
January 25–29, 2023	2023 European Championships	3; 62.77	5; 110.89	4; 173.66
November 25–27, 2022	2022 Grand Prix of Espoo	4; 62.46	2; 108.29	2; 170.75
October 28–30, 2022	2022 Skate Canada International	7; 51.49	WD	WD
October 4–9, 2022	2022 CS Finlandia Trophy	2; 62.54	2; 114.57	2; 177.11
September 21–24, 2022	2022 CS Nebelhorn Trophy	3; 67.05	2; 119.12	2; 186.17
2021–2022 season
Date	Event	SP	FS	Total
December 9–11, 2021	2022 German Championships	2; 66.20	2; 118.03	2; 184.23

=== Pair skating with Elena Pavlova (for Germany) ===
2019–2020 season
Date	Event	SP	FS	Total
December 4–7, 2019	2019 CS Golden Spin of Zagreb	5; 59.40	12; 92.41	10; 151.81
November 14–17, 2019	2019 CS Warsaw Cup	11; 51.38	5; 104.59	5; 155.97
November 5–10, 2019	2019 Volvo Open Cup	3; 54.19	5; 91.70	4; 145.89

=== Pair skating with Annika Hocke (for Germany) ===
2018–19 season
Date	Event	SP	FS	Total
March 18–24, 2019	2019 World Championships	16; 53.16	13; 113.20	14; 166.36
February 21–24, 2019	2019 International Challenge Cup	3; 58.67	3; 108.46	3; 167.13
February 5–10, 2019	2019 Bavarian Open	2; 55.34	1; 108.92	2; 164.26
December 21–23, 2018	2019 German Championships	2; 57.03	2; 112.34	2; 169.37
December 5–8, 2018	2018 CS Golden Spin of Zagreb	6; 59.34	6; 101.13	6; 160.47
October 19–21, 2018	2018 Skate America	6; 53.36	7; 91.17	7; 144.53
2017–18 season
Date	Event	SP	FS	Total
March 19–25, 2018	2018 World Championships	16; 63.26	13; 121.57	13; 184.83
February 14–15, 2018	2018 Winter Olympics	16; 63.04	16; 108.94	16; 171.98
January 15–21, 2018	2018 European Championships	9; 57.05	8; 113.16	8; 170.21
December 14–16, 2017	2018 German Championships	3; 57.19	3; 107.47	3; 164.66
November 16–19, 2017	2017 CS Warsaw Cup	3; 58.84	4; 103.11	4; 161.95
October 26–29, 2017	2017 CS Ice Star	2; 59.58	2; 113.06	2; 172.64
October 11–15, 2017	2017 International Cup of Nice	2; 55.86	2; 116.84	2; 172.70
September 27–30, 2017	2017 CS Nebelhorn Trophy	8; 56.76	4; 123.61	5; 180.37

=== Pair skating with Mari Vartmann (for Germany) ===
2016–17 season
Date	Event	SP	FS	Total
December 15–17, 2016	2017 German Championships	1; 61.22	1; 119.68	1; 180.90
November 25–27, 2016	2016 NHK Trophy	4; 61.23	6; 109.47	5; 170.70
November 18–20, 2016	2016 Cup of China	7; 60.88	5; 113.00	7; 173.88
October 6–10, 2016	2016 CS Finlandia Trophy	3; 56.58	3; 108.33	3; 164.91
September 22–24, 2016	2016 CS Nebelhorn Trophy	3; 57.74	3; 104.64	3; 162.38
2015–16 season
Date	Event	SP	FS	Total
January 25–31, 2016	2016 European Championships	4; 62.90	8; 108.40	8; 171.30
December 11–13, 2015	2016 German Championships	2; 67.09	2; 112.01	2; 179.10
November 18–22, 2015	2015 CS Tallinn Trophy	2; 61.62	2; 115.75	2; 177.04
November 6–8, 2015	2015 Cup of China	5; 63.45	7; 107.96	6; 171.41
October 27–31, 2015	2015 CS Ice Challenge	3; 56.38	2; 99.24	2; 155.62
October 14–18, 2015	2015 International Cup of Nice	1; 59.42	1; 105.98	1; 165.40
September 24–26, 2015	2015 CS Nebelhorn Trophy	2; 61.10	4; 105.40	4; 166.50

=== Pair skating with Annabelle Prölß (for Germany) ===
2014–2015 season
Date	Event	Level	SP	FS	Total
November 14–16, 2014	2014 Rostelecom Cup	Senior	6; 48.69	6; 96.47	6; 145.16
October 24–26, 2014	2014 Skate America	Senior	7; 48.87	8; 87.48	7; 136.35
2013–2014 season
Date	Event	Level	SP	FS	Total
March 6–9, 2014	2014 International Challenge Cup	Senior	3; 49.21	2; 90.83	2; 140.04
November 15–17, 2013	2013 Trophée Éric Bompard	Senior	7; 54.18	7; 103.44	7; 157.62
October 23–27, 2013	2013 International Cup of Nice	Senior	2; 57.44	3; 102.81	1; 160.25
September 26–28, 2013	2013 Nebelhorn Trophy	Senior	5; 55.24	4; 103.14	4; 158.38
September 19–22, 2013	2013 Lombardia Trophy	Senior	2; 57.88	4; 98.14	4; 156.02
2012–2013 season
Date	Event	Level	SP	FS	Total
February 27–March 3, 2013	2013 World Junior Championships	Junior	6; 49.95	4; 97.88	7; 147.83
February 6–11, 2013	2013 Bavarian Open	Junior	1; 50.25	1; 99.35	1; 149.60
December 21–22, 2012	2013 German Championships	Senior	1; 50.60	2; 97.02	1; 147.62
December 4–9, 2012	2012 NRW Trophy	Junior	1; 46.36	1; 94.27	1; 140.63
November 15–18, 2012	2013 Warsaw Cup	Junior	2; 48.68	2; 88.17	2; 136.85
November 6–11, 2012	2012 Ice Challenge	Junior	1; 40.83	1; 80.52	1; 121.35
October 10–13, 2012	2012 JGP Germany	Junior	2; 47.84	5; 85.64	4; 133.48
August 30–September 1, 2012	2012 JGP USA	Junior	7; 40.53	6; 81.92	6; 122.45
2011–2012 season
Date	Event	Level	SP	FS	Total
January 6–7, 2012	2012 German Championships	Junior	1 -	1 -	1; 118.01
