= Mari Vartmann =

German pair skater (born 1988)

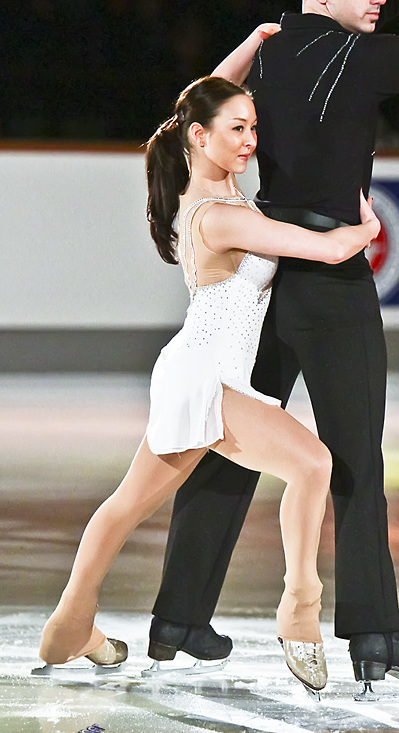
- Vartmann with Aaron Van Cleave during the exhibitions at the 2011 German Championships

Personal information
- Born: 25 December 1988 (age 37) Neuss, West Germany
- Height: 1.53 m (5 ft 0 in)

Figure skating career
- Country: Germany
- Partner: Matti Landgraf
- Coach: Maylin Wende, Daniel Wende
- Skating club: Düsseldorfer EG
- Began skating: 1995

Mari-Doris Vartmann (born 25 December 1988) is a German pair skater. With Ruben Blommaert, she won four ISU Challenger Series medals. With Aaron Van Cleave, she is the 2015 German national champion, the 2011 NRW Trophy champion, and 2010 Warsaw Cup champion.

== Personal life ==
Vartmann was born on 25 December 1988 in Neuss, West Germany. She is of German and Japanese descent.

== Career ==
=== Early career ===
Vartmann started skating at the age of five in her home town of Neuss. Four years later she moved to the Düsseldorfer club. In January 2004, she turned to pair skating and was partnered with Florian Just. The pair was coached by Knut Schubert mainly in Dortmund.

Vartmann/Just became three-time German national medalists and appeared at four ISU Championships, finishing 18th at the 2006 Worlds in Calgary, Alberta, Canada; 7th at the 2007 Europeans in Warsaw, Poland; 18th at the 2007 Worlds in Tokyo, Japan; and 7th at the 2008 Europeans in Zagreb, Croatia. They parted ways just after the 2009 NRW Trophy.

=== Partnership with Van Cleave ===
In 2010, Vartmann teamed up with Canadian-American skater Aaron Van Cleave to compete for Germany. The pair made their international debut at the 2010 Warsaw Cup where they won the gold medal. Their first major international event was the 2012 European Championships. On 26 January, during the morning practice before the long programs, Vartmann collided with Daniel Wende while they were attempting to avoid a French couple. Vartmann and Van Cleave finished 5th at the event. They were coached by Knut Schubert in Berlin.

Vartmann and Van Cleave withdrew from the 2012 Nebelhorn Trophy following the short program – Vartmann picked into her right foot when she fell on a throw triple loop during the short and was unable to put on her skate the next day due to swelling. They withdrew from the 2012 Coupe de Nice and their first assigned Grand Prix event, the 2012 Cup of Russia, after Van Cleave sustained a broken cheekbone while catching Vartmann on a triple twist. They later withdrew from their second GP, the 2012 NHK Trophy.

The pair was coached by Knut Schubert and Stefan Lindemann in Berlin in the first half of the 2014–15 season. In December 2014, they joined Maylin Wende and Daniel Wende in Oberstdorf. They won the pairs title at the 2015 German Championships.

=== Partnership with Blommaert ===
In the 2015–16 season, Vartmann started skating with Ruben Blommaert. They won the 2015 Cup of Nice. At the 2016 Europeans they placed 4th in the short program, 8th in the free program and 8th overall.

Vartmann and Blommaert started the 2016–17 season on the Challenger Series, winning bronze at both Nebelhorn Trophy and Finlandia Trophy. On 10 January 2017, the Deutsche Eislauf-Union announced that their partnership had come to an end.

=== Partnership with Landgraf ===
On 22 February 2017, German media announced that Vartmann would compete with Matti Landgraf, a German skater whose cruise ship contract ran until the end of March 2017. Daniel Wende would coach the pair in Oberstdorf.

== Programs ==
=== With Blommaert ===
Season	Short program	Free skating	Exhibition
2016–17	They Don't Care About Us by Michael Jackson	Second Law by Muse	I Put a Spell on You by Nina Simone
2015–16	Stranger in Paradise (based on Polovtsian Dances by Alexander Borodin) performed by Sarah Brightman choreo. by Mark Pillay	West Side Story by Leonard Bernstein choreo. by Mark Pillay	I Put a Spell on You by Nina Simone

=== With Van Cleave ===
Season	Short program	Free skating	Exhibition
2014–15	Waltz from Petersburg Secrets (Петербургские тайны) by Andrei Petrov	Concierto de Aranjuez by Joaquín Rodrigo	
2013–14	Where the light gets in by Sennen	Notre-Dame de Paris by Riccardo Cocciante	Skyfall by Adele
2012–13	The Messiah Will Come Again by Gary Moore	The Passion of the Christ by John Debney; Blood and Glory by Audiomachine	
2011–12	Sarabande (modern arrangement) by George Frideric Handel	The Island by Steve Jablonsky; Epicon by Globus	Le temps des cathédrales (from Notre-Dame de Paris) by Riccardo Cocciante
2010–11	The Untouchables by Ennio Morricone	The Island by Steve Jablonsky; Epicon by Globus	

=== With Just ===
Season	Short program	Free skating	Exhibition
2007–08	Shine On You Crazy Diamond by Pink Floyd	Memoirs of a Geisha by John Williams	
2006–07	Nyah (from Mission: Impossible II) by Hans Zimmer	The Promise by Klaus Badelt	
2005–06	Libertango by Astor Piazzolla performed by Bond	Once Upon a Time in America by Ennio Morricone	You're the One That I Want

== Competitive highlights ==
GP: Grand Prix; CS: Challenger Series

=== Pair skating with Ruben Blommaert ===
Competition placements at senior level
Season	2015–16	2016–17
European Championships	8th	
German Championships	2nd	1st
GP Cup of China	6th	7th
GP NHK Trophy		5th
CS Finlandia Trophy		3rd
CS Ice Challenge	2nd	
CS Nebelhorn Trophy	4th	3rd
CS Tallinn Trophy	2nd	
Cup of Nice	1st	

=== Pairs with Van Cleave ===
International
Event	10–11	11–12	12–13	13–14	14–15
Worlds		14th	16th		15th
Europeans		5th	8th	9th	7th
GP Cup of Russia			WD		
GP NHK Trophy			WD		5th
GP Skate Canada				7th	8th
Bavarian Open	3rd		3rd		
Challenge Cup			3rd		
Cup of Nice		6th	WD		3rd
Golden Spin	5th				
Ice Challenge		2nd			
Lombardia Trophy				6th	
Nebelhorn Trophy		8th	WD	3rd	
NRW Trophy	4th	1st	5th		
Warsaw Cup	1st				
National
German Champ.	2nd	2nd	2nd	3rd	1st
WD = Withdrew

=== Pairs with Just ===
International
Event	04–05	05–06	06–07	07–08	08–09	09–10
Worlds		18th	18th			
Europeans			7th	7th		
GP Cup of China				WD		
GP NHK Trophy			8th			
Cup of Nice				3rd		4th
Finlandia Trophy				3rd		
Nebelhorn Trophy		6th	WD			
NRW Trophy					2nd	3rd
National
German Champ.	4th	4th	2nd	2nd	3rd	
WD = Withdrew

=== Ladies' singles ===
Event	2000–01	2001–02	2002–03	2003–04
German Champ.	3rd J	1st J	12th	8th
J = Junior level

== Detailed results ==
=== With Blommaert ===
2016–17 season
Date	Event	SP	FS	Total
15–17 December 2016	2017 German Championships	1; 61.22	1; 119.68	1; 180.90
25–27 November 2016	2016 NHK Trophy	4; 61.23	6; 109.47	5; 170.70
18–20 November 2016	2016 Cup of China	7; 60.88	5; 113.00	7; 173.88
6–10 October 2016	2016 CS Finlandia Trophy	3; 56.58	3; 108.33	3; 164.91
22–24 September 2016	2016 CS Nebelhorn Trophy	3; 57.74	3; 104.64	3; 162.38
2015–16 season
Date	Event	SP	FS	Total
25–31 January 2016	2016 European Championships	4; 62.90	8; 108.40	8; 171.30
11–13 December 2015	2016 German Championships	2; 67.09	2; 112.01	2; 179.10
18–22 November 2015	2015 CS Tallinn Trophy	2; 61.62	2; 115.75	2; 177.04
6–8 November 2015	2015 Cup of China	5; 63.45	7; 107.96	6; 171.41
27–31 October 2015	2015 CS Ice Challenge	3; 56.38	2; 99.24	2; 155.62
14–18 October 2015	2015 International Cup of Nice	1; 59.42	1; 105.98	1; 165.40
24–26 September 2015	2015 CS Nebelhorn Trophy	2; 61.10	4; 105.40	4; 166.50
