= 2015–16 ISU Challenger Series =

- Type: ISU Challenger Series
- Date: September 16 – December 5, 2015
- Season: 2015–16
- Previous: 2014–15 ISU Challenger Series
- Next: 2016–17 ISU Challenger Series

The 2015–16 ISU Challenger Series was held from September to December 2015. It was the second season that the ISU Challenger Series, a group of senior-level international figure skating competitions, was held.

== Competitions ==
This season, the series included the following events.

| Date | Event | Location | Results |
|---|---|---|---|
| September 16–20 | (United States) 2015 U.S. International Classic | Salt Lake City, Utah, United States | Details |
| September 24–26 | (Germany) 2015 Nebelhorn Trophy | Oberstdorf, Germany | Details |
| October 1–3 | (Slovakia) 2015 Ondrej Nepela Trophy | Bratislava, Slovakia | Details |
| October 8–11 | (Finland) 2015 Finlandia Trophy | Espoo, Finland | Details |
| October 15–18 | (Russia) 2015 Mordovian Ornament | Saransk, Russia | Details |
| October 20–25 | (Bulgaria) 2015 Denkova-Staviski Cup | Sofia, Bulgaria | Details |
| October 27 – November 1 | (Austria) 2015 Ice Challenge | Graz, Austria | Details |
| November 18–22 | (Estonia) 2015 Tallinn Trophy | Tallinn, Estonia | Details |
| November 26–29 | (Poland) 2015 Warsaw Cup | Warsaw, Poland | Details |
| December 2–5 | (Croatia) 2015 Golden Spin of Zagreb | Zagreb, Croatia | Details |

== Medal summary ==
=== Men's singles ===
| Competition | Gold | Silver | Bronze | Results |
|---|---|---|---|---|
| (United States) U.S. International Classic | (Israel) Daniel Samohin | (Japan) Keiji Tanaka | (United States) Ross Miner | Details |
| (Germany) Nebelhorn Trophy | (Canada) Elladj Baldé | (United States) Max Aaron | (Russia) Konstantin Menshov | Details |
| (Slovakia) Ondrej Nepela Trophy | (United States) Jason Brown | (Russia) Mikhail Kolyada | (Russia) Gordei Gorshkov | Details |
| (Finland) Finlandia Trophy | (Russia) Konstantin Menshov | (United States) Adam Rippon | (Russia) Sergei Voronov | Details |
| (Russia) Mordovian Ornament | (Russia) Maxim Kovtun | (Israel) Daniel Samohin | (Russia) Moris Kvitelashvili | Details |
| (Bulgaria) Denkova-Staviski Cup | (Uzbekistan) Misha Ge | (Malaysia) Julian Zhi Jie Yee | (Italy) Matteo Rizzo | Details |
| (Austria) Ice Challenge | (Russia) Artur Dmitriev | (United States) Jason Brown | (Russia) Mikhail Kolyada | Details |
| (Estonia) Tallinn Trophy | (United States) Max Aaron | (Russia) Dmitri Aliev | (Latvia) Deniss Vasiļjevs | Details |
| (Poland) Warsaw Cup | (Russia) Alexander Samarin | (Russia) Anton Shulepov | (Russia) Zhan Bush | Details |
| (Croatia) Golden Spin of Zagreb | (Kazakhstan) Denis Ten | (United States) Adam Rippon | (Russia) Adian Pitkeev | Details |

=== Ladies' singles ===
| Competition | Gold | Silver | Bronze | Results |
|---|---|---|---|---|
| (United States) U.S. International Classic | (Japan) Satoko Miyahara | (Kazakhstan) Elizabet Tursynbayeva | (United States) Angela Wang | Details |
| (Germany) Nebelhorn Trophy | (Canada) Kaetlyn Osmond | (Russia) Alena Leonova | (United States) Courtney Hicks | Details |
| (Slovakia) Ondrej Nepela Trophy | (Russia) Evgenia Medvedeva | (Russia) Anna Pogorilaya | (Russia) Maria Artemieva | Details |
| (Finland) Finlandia Trophy | (Japan) Rika Hongo | (Russia) Yulia Lipnitskaya | (Sweden) Joshi Helgesson | Details |
| (Russia) Mordovian Ornament | (Russia) Anna Pogorilaya | (Russia) Adelina Sotnikova | (Russia) Maria Artemieva | Details |
| (Bulgaria) Denkova-Staviski Cup | (Sweden) Isabelle Olsson | (Latvia) Angelīna Kučvaļska | (Norway) Anne Line Gjersem | Details |
| (Austria) Ice Challenge | (United States) Mirai Nagasu | (Russia) Maria Artemieva | (United States) Tyler Pierce | Details |
| (Estonia) Tallinn Trophy | (Russia) Maria Sotskova | (Kazakhstan) Elizabet Tursynbayeva | (United States) Tyler Pierce | Details |
| (Poland) Warsaw Cup | (Russia) Elizaveta Tuktamysheva | (Russia) Serafima Sakhanovich | (Armenia) Anastasia Galustyan | Details |
| (Croatia) Golden Spin of Zagreb | (Russia) Elizaveta Tuktamysheva | (Kazakhstan) Elizabet Tursynbayeva | (United States) Karen Chen | Details |

=== Pairs ===
| Competition | Gold | Silver | Bronze | Results |
|---|---|---|---|---|
| (United States) U.S. International Classic | (United States) Tarah Kayne / Daniel O'Shea | (United States) Marissa Castelli / Mervin Tran | (Canada) Kirsten Moore-Towers / Michael Marinaro | Details |
| (Germany) Nebelhorn Trophy | (Russia) Tatiana Volosozhar / Maxim Trankov | (United States) Alexa Scimeca / Chris Knierim | (France) Vanessa James / Morgan Ciprès | Details |
| (Slovakia) Ondrej Nepela Trophy | (Russia) Ksenia Stolbova / Fedor Klimov | (Russia) Kristina Astakhova / Alexei Rogonov | (Russia) Evgenia Tarasova / Vladimir Morozov | Details |
| (Russia) Mordovian Ornament | (Russia) Yuko Kavaguti / Alexander Smirnov | (Russia) Natalja Zabijako / Alexander Enbert | (Lithuania) Goda Butkute / Nikita Ermolaev | Details |
| (Austria) Ice Challenge | (United States) Alexa Scimeca / Chris Knierim | (Germany) Mari Vartmann / Ruben Blommaert | (Italy) Nicole Della Monica / Matteo Guarise | Details |
| (Estonia) Tallinn Trophy | (Germany) Aliona Savchenko / Bruno Massot | (Germany) Mari Vartmann / Ruben Blommaert | (United Kingdom) Amani Fancy / Christopher Boyadji | Details |
| (Poland) Warsaw Cup | (Germany) Aliona Savchenko / Bruno Massot | (Italy) Nicole Della Monica / Matteo Guarise | (Lithuania) Goda Butkute / Nikita Ermolaev | Details |
| (Croatia) Golden Spin of Zagreb | (Russia) Evgenia Tarasova / Vladimir Morozov | (Russia) Kristina Astakhova / Alexei Rogonov | (United States) Tarah Kayne / Daniel O'Shea | Details |

=== Ice dance ===
| Competition | Gold | Silver | Bronze | Results |
|---|---|---|---|---|
| (United States) U.S. International Classic | (United States) Madison Hubbell / Zachary Donohue | (Denmark) Laurence Fournier Beaudry / Nikolaj Sørensen | (Canada) Élisabeth Paradis / François-Xavier Ouellette | Details |
| (Germany) Nebelhorn Trophy | (United States) Madison Chock / Evan Bates | (Canada) Alexandra Paul / Mitchell Islam | (United States) Anastasia Cannuscio / Colin McManus | Details |
| (Slovakia) Ondrej Nepela Trophy | (Canada) Piper Gilles / Paul Poirier | (United Kingdom) Penny Coomes / Nicholas Buckland | (United States) Maia Shibutani / Alex Shibutani | Details |
| (Finland) Finlandia Trophy | (Canada) Kaitlyn Weaver / Andrew Poje | (Israel) Isabella Tobias / Ilia Tkachenko | (Denmark) Laurence Fournier Beaudry / Nikolaj Sørensen | Details |
| (Russia) Mordovian Ornament | (Russia) Elena Ilinykh / Ruslan Zhiganshin | (Israel) Isabella Tobias / Ilia Tkachenko | (Poland) Natalia Kaliszek / Maxim Spodirev | Details |
| (Bulgaria) Denkova-Staviski Cup | (Turkey) Alisa Agafonova / Alper Uçar | (Belarus) Viktoria Kavaliova / Yurii Bieliaiev | (Russia) Ludmila Sosnitskaia / Pavel Golovishnokov | Details |
| (Austria) Ice Challenge | (United States) Danielle Thomas / Daniel Eaton | (Italy) Misato Komatsubara / Andrea Fabbri | (Finland) Olesia Karmi / Max Lindholm | Details |
| (Estonia) Tallinn Trophy | (Israel) Isabella Tobias / Ilia Tkachenko | (Slovakia) Federica Testa / Lukas Csolley | (Finland) Cecilia Törn / Jussiville Partanen | Details |
| (Poland) Warsaw Cup | (Italy) Charlène Guignard / Marco Fabbri | (Poland) Natalia Kaliszek / Maksym Spodyriev | (Finland) Cecilia Törn / Jussiville Partanen | Details |
| (Croatia) Golden Spin of Zagreb | (Italy) Charlène Guignard / Marco Fabbri | (United States) Kaitlin Hawayek / Jean-Luc Baker | (Armenia) Tina Garabedian / Simon Proulx-Sénécal | Details |

== Medal standings ==
| Rank | Nation | Gold | Silver | Bronze | Total |
|---|---|---|---|---|---|
| 1 | Russia (RUS) | 14 | 12 | 11 | 37 |
| 2 | United States (USA) | 8 | 7 | 9 | 24 |
| 3 | Canada (CAN) | 4 | 1 | 2 | 7 |
| 4 | Israel (ISR) | 2 | 3 | 0 | 5 |
| 5 | Italy (ITA) | 2 | 2 | 2 | 6 |
| 6 | Germany (GER) | 2 | 2 | 0 | 4 |
| 7 | Japan (JPN) | 2 | 1 | 0 | 3 |
| 8 | Kazakhstan (KAZ) | 1 | 3 | 0 | 4 |
| 9 | Sweden (SWE) | 1 | 0 | 1 | 2 |
| 10 | Turkey (TUR) | 1 | 0 | 0 | 1 |
| 10 | Uzbekistan (UZB) | 1 | 0 | 0 | 1 |
| 12 | Denmark (DEN) | 0 | 1 | 1 | 2 |
| 12 | Great Britain (GBR) | 0 | 1 | 1 | 2 |
| 12 | Latvia (LAT) | 0 | 1 | 1 | 2 |
| 12 | Poland (POL) | 0 | 1 | 1 | 2 |
| 16 | Belarus (BLR) | 0 | 1 | 0 | 1 |
| 16 | Malaysia (MAS) | 0 | 1 | 0 | 1 |
| 16 | Slovakia (SVK) | 0 | 1 | 0 | 1 |
| 19 | Finland (FIN) | 0 | 0 | 3 | 3 |
| 20 | Armenia (ARM) | 0 | 0 | 2 | 2 |
| 20 | Lithuania (LTU) | 0 | 0 | 2 | 2 |
| 22 | France (FRA) | 0 | 0 | 1 | 1 |
| 22 | Norway (NOR) | 0 | 0 | 1 | 1 |
| Totals (23 entries) | | 38 | 38 | 38 | 114 |

== Challenger Series rankings ==
The ISU Challenger Series rankings were formed by combining the two highest final scores of each skater or team.

=== Men's singles ===
| No. | Skater | Nation | First event | Score | Second event | Score | Total score |
|---|---|---|---|---|---|---|---|
| 1 | Jason Brown | United States | Ondrej Nepela Trophy | 239.37 | Ice Challenge | 240.65 | 480.02 |
| 2 | Max Aaron | United States | Nebelhorn Trophy | 222.94 | Tallinn Trophy | 252.16 | 475.10 |
| 3 | Mikhail Kolyada | Russia | Ondrej Nepela Trophy | 229.59 | Ice Challenge | 239.77 | 469.36 |
| 4 | Adam Rippon | United States | Finlandia Trophy | 224.18 | Golden Spin of Zagreb | 237.87 | 462.05 |
| 5 | Daniel Samohin | Israel | U.S. International Classic | 223.67 | Mordovian Ornament | 235.14 | 458.81 |

=== Ladies' singles ===
| No. | Skater | Nation | First event | Score | Second event | Score | Total score |
|---|---|---|---|---|---|---|---|
| 1 | Elizaveta Tuktamysheva | Russia | Warsaw Cup | 192.93 | Golden Spin of Zagreb | 201.33 | 394.26 |
| 2 | Anna Pogorilaya | Russia | Ondrej Nepela Trophy | 178.38 | Mordovian Ornament | 214.07 | 392.45 |
| 3 | Adelina Sotnikova | Russia | Mordovian Ornament | 203.89 | Golden Spin of Zagreb | 159.80 | 363.69 |
| 4 | Elizabet Tursynbayeva | Kazakhstan | U.S. International Classic | 177.91 | Golden Spin of Zagreb | 176.33 | 354.24 |
| 5 | Maria Artemieva | Russia | Ondrej Nepela Trophy | 177.21 | Mordovian Ornament | 173.87 | 351.08 |

=== Pairs ===
| No. | Team | Nation | First event | Score | Second event | Score | Total score |
|---|---|---|---|---|---|---|---|
| 1 | Aliona Savchenko / Bruno Massot | Germany | Tallinn Trophy | 214.42 | Warsaw Cup | 209.60 | 424.02 |
| 2 | Evgenia Tarasova / Vladimir Morozov | Russia | Ondrej Nepela Trophy | 184.28 | Golden Spin of Zagreb | 192.22 | 376.50 |
| 3 | Natalja Zabijako / Alexander Enbert | Russia | Mordovian Ornament | 196.22 | Golden Spin of Zagreb | 173.62 | 369.84 |
| 4 | Kristina Astakhova / Alexei Rogonov | Russia | Ondrej Nepela Trophy | 185.00 | Golden Spin of Zagreb | 183.88 | 368.88 |
| 5 | Alexa Scimeca / Chris Knierim | United States | Nebelhorn Trophy | 179.56 | Ice Challenge | 189.28 | 368.84 |

=== Ice dance ===
| No. | Team | Nation | First event | Score | Second event | Score | Total score |
|---|---|---|---|---|---|---|---|
| 1 | Charlène Guignard / Marco Fabbri | Italy | Warsaw Cup | 169.72 | Golden Spin of Zagreb | 172.28 | 342.00 |
| 2 | Isabella Tobias / Ilia Tkachenko | Israel | Mordovian Ornament | 160.98 | Tallinn Trophy | 160.84 | 321.82 |
| 3 | Natalia Kaliszek / Maxim Spodirev | Poland | Mordovian Ornament | 150.60 | Warsaw Cup | 147.52 | 298.12 |
| 4 | Alisa Agafonova / Alper Uçar | Turkey | Mordovian Ornament | 145.34 | Denkova-Staviski Cup | 151.74 | 297.08 |
| 5 | Viktoria Kavaliova / Yurii Bieliaiev | Belarus | Mordovian Ornament | 142.86 | Denkova-Staviski Cup | 148.08 | 290.94 |

== Top scores ==
=== Men's singles ===
Top 10 best scores in the men's combined total
| No. | Skater | Nation | Score | Event |
|---|---|---|---|---|
| 1 | Denis Ten | Kazakhstan | 276.39 | 2015 Golden Spin of Zagreb |
| 2 | Max Aaron | United States | 252.16 | 2015 Tallinn Trophy |
| 3 | Artur Dmitriev | Russia | 247.57 | 2015 Ice Challenge |
| 4 | Elladj Baldé | Canada | 242.36 | 2015 Nebelhorn Trophy |
| 5 | Jason Brown | United States | 240.65 | 2015 Ice Challenge |
| 6 | Mikhail Kolyada | Russia | 239.77 | 2015 Ice Challenge |
| 7 | Adam Rippon | United States | 237.87 | 2015 Golden Spin of Zagreb |
| 8 | Maxim Kovtun | Russia | 236.38 | 2015 Mordovian Ornament |
| 9 | Daniel Samohin | Israel | 235.14 | 2015 Mordovian Ornament |
| 10 | Jorik Hendrickx | Belgium | 233.47 | 2015 Ice Challenge |

=== Ladies' singles ===
Top 10 best scores in the ladies' combined total
| No. | Skater | Nation | Score | Event |
|---|---|---|---|---|
| 1 | Anna Pogorilaya | Russia | 214.07 | 2015 Mordovian Ornament |
| 2 | Adelina Sotnikova | Russia | 203.89 | 2015 Mordovian Ornament |
| 3 | Elizaveta Tuktamysheva | Russia | 201.33 | 2015 Golden Spin of Zagreb |
| 4 | Rika Hongo | Japan | 187.45 | 2015 Finlandia Trophy |
| 5 | Maria Sotskova | Russia | 186.30 | 2015 Tallinn Trophy |
| 6 | Evgenia Medvedeva | Russia | 183.94 | 2015 Ondrej Nepela Trophy |
| 7 | Satoko Miyahara | Japan | 183.64 | 2015 U.S. International Classic |
| 8 | Kaetlyn Osmond | Canada | 179.41 | 2015 Nebelhorn Trophy |
| 9 | Elizabet Tursynbayeva | Kazakhstan | 177.91 | 2015 U.S. International Classic |
| 10 | Maria Artemieva | Russia | 177.21 | 2015 Ondrej Nepela Trophy |

=== Pairs ===
Top 10 best scores in the pairs' combined total
| No. | Team | Nation | Score | Event |
|---|---|---|---|---|
| 1 | Aliona Savchenko / Bruno Massot | Germany | 214.42 | 2015 Tallinn Trophy |
| 2 | Yuko Kavaguti / Alexander Smirnov | Russia | 214.05 | 2015 Mordovian Ornament |
| 3 | Tatiana Volosozhar / Maxim Trankov | Russia | 202.79 | 2015 Nebelhorn Trophy |
| 4 | Natalja Zabijako / Alexander Enbert | Russia | 196.22 | 2015 Mordovian Ornament |
| 5 | Evgenia Tarasova / Vladimir Morozov | Russia | 192.22 | 2015 Golden Spin of Zagreb |
| 6 | Nicole Della Monica / Matteo Guarise | Italy | 191.98 | 2015 Warsaw Cup |
| 7 | Ksenia Stolbova / Fedor Klimov | Russia | 190.28 | 2015 Ondrej Nepela Trophy |
| 8 | Alexa Scimeca / Chris Knierim | United States | 189.28 | 2015 Ice Challenge |
| 9 | Kristina Astakhova / Alexei Rogonov | Russia | 185.00 | 2015 Ondrej Nepela Trophy |
| 10 | Mari Vartmann / Ruben Blommaert | Germany | 177.04 | 2015 Tallinn Trophy |

=== Ice dance ===
Top 10 best scores in the combined total (ice dance)
| No. | Team | Nation | Score | Event |
|---|---|---|---|---|
| 1 | Elena Ilinykh / Ruslan Zhiganshin | Russia | 176.70 | 2015 Mordovian Ornament |
| 2 | Charlène Guignard / Marco Fabbri | Italy | 172.28 | 2015 Golden Spin of Zagreb |
| 3 | Madison Chock / Evan Bates | United States | 169.50 | 2015 Nebelhorn Trophy |
| 4 | Kaitlyn Weaver / Andrew Poje | Canada | 161.67 | 2015 Finlandia Trophy |
| 5 | Isabella Tobias / Ilia Tkachenko | Israel | 160.98 | 2015 Mordovian Ornament |
| 6 | Piper Gilles / Paul Poirier | Canada | 159.14 | 2015 Ondrej Nepela Trophy |
| 7 | Penny Coomes / Nicholas Buckland | Great Britain | 156.22 | 2015 Ondrej Nepela Trophy |
| 8 | Maia Shibutani / Alex Shibutani | United States | 154.34 | 2015 Ondrej Nepela Trophy |
| 9 | Madison Hubbell / Zachary Donohue | United States | 153.62 | 2015 U.S. International Classic |
| 10 | Kaitlin Hawayek / Jean-Luc Baker | United States | 153.06 | 2015 Golden Spin of Zagreb |
