= Katharina Müller =

German ice dancer (born 1995)

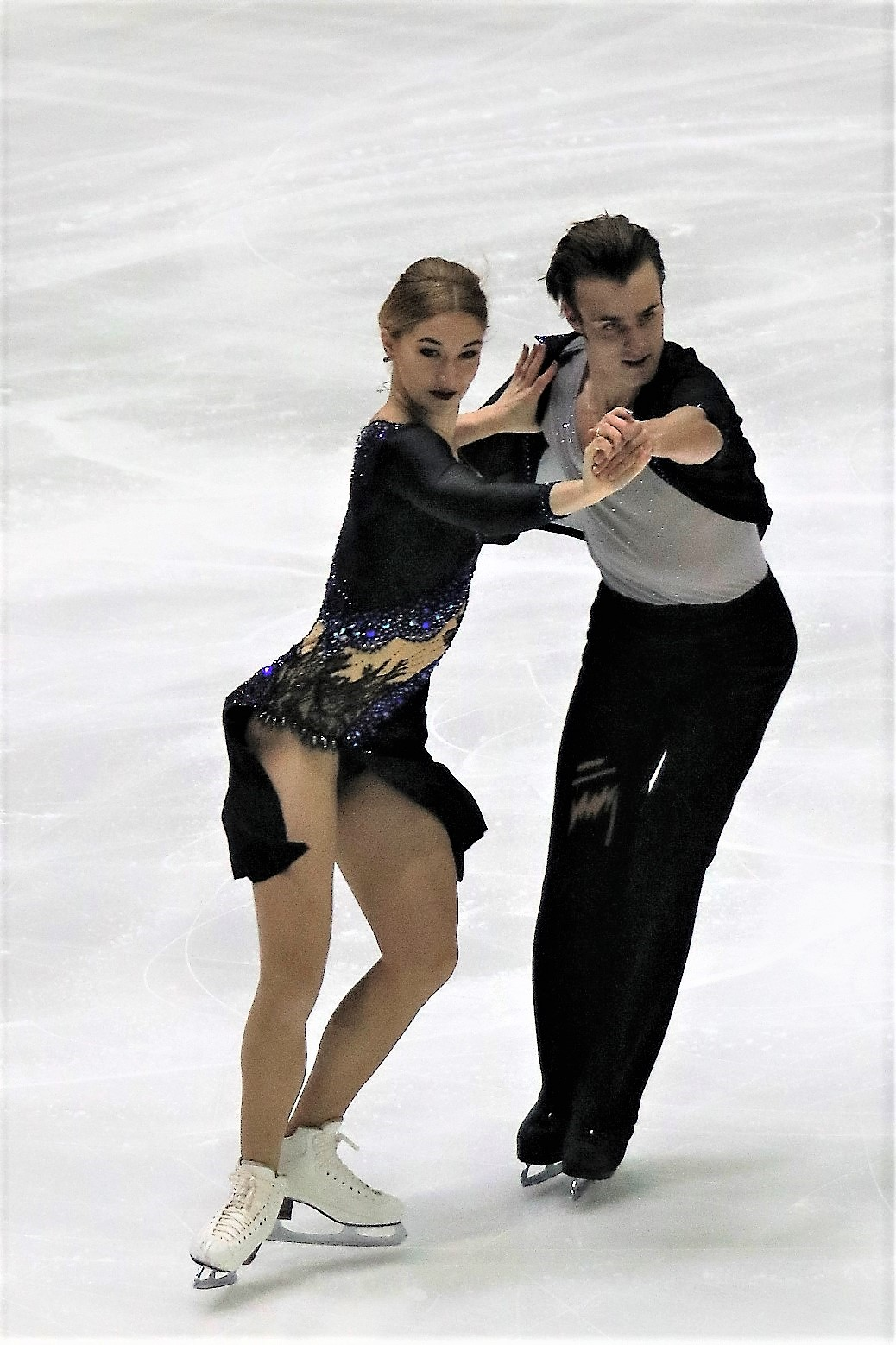

Personal information
- Other names: Mueller
- Born: 12 September 1995 (age 31) Nizhnevartovsk, Russia
- Home town: Gütersloh, Germany
- Height: 1.70 m (5 ft 7 in)

Figure skating career
- Country: Germany
- Skating club: ERC Westfalen
- Began skating: 2000
- Retired: December 21, 2023

Katharina Müller (born 12 September 1995) is a retired German competitive ice dancer. With her skating partner Tim Dieck, she is a two-time German national champion and has won many senior international medals, including two silver medals on the ISU Challenger Series and three gold medals at the German NRW Trophy. They have represented Germany at the European and World championships.

== Personal life ==
Katharina Müller was born on 12 September 1995 in Nizhnevartovsk, Russia. She moved with her family to Germany in 1999. As of 2017, she is studying teaching, English, and sports science at Ruhr University Bochum.

== Competitive career ==
=== Early career ===
Müller began skating in 2000 in Bielefeld. She took up ice dancing in 2009, teaming up with Justin Gerke. The two were coached by Vladimir Tsvetkov in Berlin. They parted ways after the 2012–13 season, Gerke having decided to retire from competition.

=== 2014–15 season ===
Vitali Schulz arranged a tryout between Müller and Tim Dieck. They teamed up in April 2014, coached by Schulz und James Young in Dortmund. Assigned to two Junior Grand Prix events, they placed eighth in Ljubljana, Slovenia, and seventh in Aichi, Japan. After winning the 2015 German junior national title, they were sent to the 2015 World Junior Championships in Tallinn, Estonia; ranked thirteenth in the short dance, they qualified for the final segment and finished twelfth overall.

=== 2015–16 season ===
Competing in the Challenger Series (CS), Müller/Dieck finished tenth in September at the 2015 Nebelhorn Trophy – their first senior international – and eighth the following month at the 2015 Mordovian Ornament. In November, they won bronze at the 2015 NRW Trophy before appearing at their third CS event, the 2015 Tallinn Trophy, where they placed fifth. They were awarded the silver medal at the German Championships in December, having finished second to Lorenz/Polizoakis, and took bronze at the Toruń Cup. Müller/Dieck were included in Germany's team to the 2016 European Championships in Bratislava, Slovakia, but were eliminated after placing twenty-third in the short dance.

In spring 2016, Müller/Dieck began training under Marina Zueva in Canton, Michigan, in addition to Schulz and Young in Dortmund.

=== 2016–17 season ===
Müller/Dieck competed at two Challenger events, placing twelfth at the 2016 CS U.S. Classic and ninth at the 2016 CS Nebelhorn Trophy. They won gold at the NRW Trophy for the first time, and were the German national silver medalists for the second consecutive year

=== 2017–18 season ===
Competing three times on the Challenger series, Müller/Dieck were fifth at the 2017 CS Warsaw Cup, sixth at the 2017 CS Ice Star, and eleventh at the 2017 CS Golden Spin of Zagreb. They won the silver medal at the German championships for the third consecutive year.

=== 2018–19 season ===
Again competing on the Challenger series three times, Müller/Dieck were seventh at both the 2018 CS Nebelhorn Trophy and the 2018 CS Golden Spin of Zagreb and ninth at the 2018 CS Ondrej Nepela Trophy. They were invited to make their Grand Prix debut, placing seventh at the 2018 Skate America and tenth at the 2018 Grand Prix of Helsinki. NRW Trophy champions for the second time, they then won their fourth consecutive silver medal at the German championships.

=== 2019–20 season ===
Müller/Dieck's three Challenger competitions for the year were the 2019 CS Ondrej Nepela Memorial, the 2019 CS Ice Star and the 2019 CS Golden Spin of Zagreb, where they placed eighth, sixth and sixth, respectively. They did not return to the Grand Prix, but won the inaugural Denis Ten Memorial Challenge and the Open d'Andorra, followed by becoming German national champions for the first time.

Müller/Dieck attended the European Championships for the first time in four seasons, placing thirteenth. They were supposed to make their World Championship debut at the 2020 edition in Montreal, but these were cancelled as a result of the COVID-19 pandemic.

=== 2020–21 season ===
Despite the continued limitations of the pandemic on international competition, Müller/Dieck won their first Challenger medal, a silver at the 2020 CS Budapest Trophy, as well as their third gold medal at the NRW Trophy. Repeating as German national champions, they went on to make their World Championship debut at the 2021 World Championships in Stockholm, where they came in eighteenth. This result qualified a berth for a German ice dance team at the 2022 Winter Olympics in Beijing.

=== 2021–22 season ===
Müller/Dieck began the season at the 2021 CS Nebelhorn Trophy, winning the silver medal. Dieck noted that it was "always special to win a medal in Germany", while Müller said "we were not competing for an Olympic spot here, but it was important to us for our national qualification and to prove that we are ready and want to go to the Olympic Games." They came ninth at the 2021 CS Finlandia Trophy.

Initially assigned to the 2021 Cup of China on the Grand Prix, upon its cancellation Müller/Dieck were reassigned to the 2021 Gran Premio d'Italia. They finished in eighth place. They were sixth at the 2021 CS Cup of Austria and second at the Open d'Andorra.

Despite losing the German national title to rivals Janse van Rensburg/Steffan, Müller/Dieck were named to the German Olympic team. They first competed at the 2022 European Championships, finishing in twelfth place.

Müller/Dieck began the 2022 Winter Olympics as the German entries in the rhythm dance segment of the Olympic team event, where they finished tenth among ten. In the dance event, they were twenty-first in the rhythm dance, missing the cut for the free dance.

The team encountered new difficulties following the Olympics, as resultant tensions between Russia and Germany resulted in their being unable to return to their Moscow training location.

Müller ultimately announced her retirement from competitive ice dance in December 2023.

== Coaching career ==
Following her retirement, Müller moved to Egna, Italy to coach at the Young Goose Academy, alongside Matteo Zanni and Barbora Řezníčková.

Her current and former students include:

- (Poland) Olexandra Borysova / Aaron Freeman
- (Germany) Darya Grimm / Grigorii Rodin
- (Cyprus) Angelina Kudryavtseva / Ilia Karankevich
- (Czech Republic) Kateřina Mrázková / Daniel Mrázek
- (Slovakia) Anna Šimová / Kirill Aksenov
- (Ukraine) Myroslava Tkachenko / Riccardo Pesca
- (Slovakia) Aneta Václavíková / Ivan Morozov

== Programs ==
=== With Dieck ===
Season	Short dance	Free dance
2021–2022	Spirit in the Sky by Norman Greenbaum; Toxic by Britney Spears; Seven Nation Army by The White Stripes	Run to You by Whitney Houston; Queen of the Night performed by Alexandra Burke; I Will Always Love You by Whitney Houston
2020–2021	Quickstep: Steppin' Out with My Baby (from Easter Parade) by Irving Berlin; Foxtrot: The Way You Look Tonight (from Swing Time) by Jerome Kern & Dorothy Fields; Quickstep: Puttin' On the Ritz by Irving Berlin	Coco Chanel by Andrea Guerra; Man's World
2019–2020	Quickstep: Express; Foxtrot: Show Me How You Burlesque; Quickstep: Tough Lover (from Burlesque) by Christina Aguilera	Coco Chanel by Andrea Guerra; Man's World
2018–2019	Tango	The Way Through Cancer; Blood and Guts; Steppe by René Aubry; Where is my Mind by Maxence Cyrin
2017–2018	Dibby Dibby Sound by Avera; I'm Not the Only One by Sam Smith	The Bodyguard by Whitney Houston
2016–2017	Blues: New Year's Blues; Swing: Jolie Coquine	Megecina; Tabakiera; Mahalageasca (Bucovina Dub)
2015–2016	March: MicMacs à tire-larigot; Waltz: MicMacs à tire-larigot	Ave Maria by Thomas Spencer-Wortley
2014–2015	Samba: Chinqui Chinqui Boom; Rhumba: You're My Everything; Samba: Jump in the Line (Shake, Senora)	Burlesque: Express by Christina Aguilera; Welcome to Burlesque by Cher; Show Me How You Burlesque by Christina Aguilera

=== With Gerke ===
Season	Short dance	Free dance
2011–2012	Rumba: After Dark by Tito & Tarantula; Cha Cha: Bla Bla Bla Cha Cha Cha by Petty Booka	Milonga Triste by Victor Hugo Díaz; Tango Stazo by Leandra Gamine

== Competitive highlights ==
GP: Grand Prix; CS: Challenger Series; JGP: Junior Grand Prix

=== With Dieck ===
International
Event	14–15	15–16	16–17	17–18	18–19	19–20	20–21	21–22
Olympics								21st
Worlds						C	18th	
Europeans		23rd				13th		12th
GP Cup of China								C
GP Finland					10th			
GP France							C	
GP Italy								8th
GP Skate America					7th			
CS Budapest Trophy							2nd	
CS Cup of Austria								6th
CS Finlandia Trophy								9th
CS Golden Spin				11th	7th	6th		
CS Ice Star				6th		6th		
CS Mordovian		8th						
CS Nebelhorn Trophy		10th	9th		7th			2nd
CS Ondrej Nepela					9th	8th		
CS Tallinn Trophy		5th						
CS U.S. Classic			12th					
CS Warsaw Cup				5th			C	
Bavarian Open		5th						
Cup of Nice			2nd	9th				
Denis Ten Memorial						1st		
Egna Trophy						4th	WD	
Mezzaluna Cup						5th		
NRW Trophy		3rd	1st		1st		1st	
Open d'Andorra			2nd			1st		2nd
Universiade			4th		7th			
Toruń Cup		3rd						
Volvo Open				1st	2nd			
International: Junior
Junior Worlds	12th							
JGP Japan	7th							
JGP Slovenia	8th							
Bavarian Open	3rd							
Ice Star	4th							
NRW Trophy	1st							
Santa Claus Cup	3rd							
National
German Champ.	1st J	2nd	2nd	2nd	2nd	1st	1st	2nd
Team Events
Olympics								9th T 10th P
TBD = Assigned; WD = Withdrew; C = Event cancelled Levels: J = Junior

=== With Gerke ===
International
Event	09–10	10–11	11–12	12–13
Bavarian Open				14th
Golden Spin				15th
NRW Trophy				11th
Pavel Roman				14th
Volvo Open Cup				8th
International: Junior
JGP Latvia			14th	
Bavarian Open		10th	8th	
NRW Trophy		19th	11th	
Pavel Roman		11th	14th	
Santa Claus Cup			19th	
Toruń Cup			4th	
National
German Champ.	9th J	5th J	2nd J	4th
J = Junior level
