= Joti Polizoakis =

German ice dancer and choreographer (born 1995)

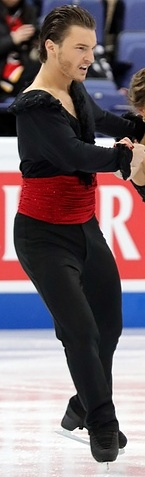
- Polizoakis at the 2017 World Figure Skating Championships

Personal information
- Born: 9 June 1995 (age 31) Bietigheim-Bissingen, Germany
- Height: 1.70 m (5 ft 7 in)

Figure skating career
- Country: Czech Republic
- Discipline: Ice dance
- Coach: Marina Zueva, Massimo Scali, Oleg Epstein, Martin Skotnický
- Skating club: EC Oberstdorf
- Began skating: 2000
- Retired: June 7, 2019

Medal record
Representing Czech Republic
Czech Championships
Silver medal – second place	2023 Budapest	Ice dance

Panagiotis "Joti" Polizoakis (born 9 June 1995) is a German ice dancer and choreographer. He is a three-time German national champion (2016–2018) and has finished 16th at the 2018 Olympic Winter Games.

== Personal life ==
Joti Polizoakis was born on 9 June 1995 in Bietigheim-Bissingen. He is the oldest child of a Czech woman and a Greek who was born in Germany. He is fluent in German, Czech, and Greek, as well as English and French. He has two younger siblings. Polizoakis served as a sports soldier in the German military from 2017 to 2019.

Joti Polizoakis resides and lives in Berlin, Germany.

== Career ==
Polizoakis began learning to skate in 2000. He competed at ISU Junior Grand Prix events and won the German junior national title. He was the German Junior National Champion in 2013 and 2014.

He was coached by Michael Huth.

In 2014–15, he moved up to the senior level but struggled with many injuries and health problems. He competed at two ISU Challenger Series events and placed 6th at the 2015 German Championships.

=== Partnership with Lorenz ===
In the spring of 2015, Polizoakis teamed up with Kavita Lorenz to compete in ice dancing. The two had known each other for many years. They were coached by Igor Shpilband and Martin Skotnický in Novi, Michigan.

Making their international debut, Lorenz/Polizoakis finished fourth at the 2015 Nebelhorn Trophy, a Challenger Series (CS) event. They placed fifth at the 2015 Ondrej Nepela Trophy (CS), first at the 2015 Open d'Andorra, and fifth at the 2015 Warsaw Cup (CS). In December, they won the German national title ahead of Katharina Müller / Tim Dieck and were selected to represent Germany at the 2016 European Championships in Bratislava, Slovakia. At Europeans in January, Lorenz/Polizoakis placed 13th in the short dance to qualify for the free, where they ranked 15th, resulting in a final placement of 14th at their first ISU Championship. In March, they qualified for the final segment at the 2016 World Championships in Boston by placing 18th in the short dance and went on to finish 17th overall. They ended their partnership in April 2016, but announced in June that they would continue skating together.

Polizoakis and Lorenz defended their national title in 2017 and 2018 for three consecutive times and managed to secure a spot for the 2018 Winter Olympics. This should be, so far, the biggest achievement of his career. They switched coaches in the Olympic season to be trained by Marina Zoueva and Massimo Scali in Canton, Michigan.

After the World Championships in 2018, Lorenz ended her career, and Polizoakis has been looking for a partner ever since.

=== Olympic Winter Games ===
Polizoakis and his partner qualified for the Winter Olympic Games 2018 in PyeongChang, South Korea, by winning the German National Championships in 2018. At the Olympic Games, they placed 7th in the figure skating team event. In the individual event, Polizoakis qualified for the final and ended up in 16th place in the ice dance event.

=== Holiday On Ice ===
Polizoakis toured Germany and Austria as a star guest in the 2019/2020 season with Holiday On Ice.

In total, he performed in 11 different cities.

== Programs ==
=== With Lorenz ===
Season	Short dance	Free dance
2017–18	Salsa: Aguanile by Marc Anthony; Rhumba: Mil Pasos (Remix); Samba: Magalenha by Sérgio Mendes	Pride & Prejudice (soundtrack) by Dario Marianelli & Jean-Yves Thibaudet
2016–17	Blues: Come Together; Hip hop: Black or White remix by Michael Jackson	Malagueña by Roni Benise; Jeux Interdits Narcisco Yepes; Jaleo by Louis Winsberg; Poeta by Vicente Amigo
2015–16	Waltz, Polka, Waltz, Foxtrot, March: The Sound of Music by Richard Rodgers	Amélie by Yann Tiersen

=== Single skating ===
Season	Short program	Free skating
2014–15	Zorba the Greek by Mikis Theodorakis	Bring Him Home (from Les Misérables) by Claude-Michel Schönberg
2013–14	La gazza ladra by Gioachino Rossini	The Phantom of the Opera by Andrew Lloyd Webber
2012–13	Adiós Nonino by Astor Piazzolla	The Nutcracker by Pyotr Ilyich Tchaikovsky modern arrangement by Trans-Siberian Orchestra

== Competitive highlights ==
GP: Grand Prix; CS: Challenger Series; JGP: Junior Grand Prix

=== With Cimlová for Czech Republic ===
International
Event	22-23
CS Budapest Trophy	13th
CS Golden Spin	WD
Mezzaluna Cup	3rd
Pavel Roman Memorial	1st
Santa Claus Cup	WD
National
Czech Champ.	2nd
Four Nationals	6th
TBD = Assigned; WD = Withdrew

=== With Lorenz for Germany ===
International
Event	2015–16	2016–17	2017–18
Olympics			16th
World Champ.	17th	19th	16th
European Champ.	14th	14th	WD
GP Skate Canada			8th
CS Golden Spin		4th	9th
CS Nebelhorn Trophy	4th	5th	3rd
CS Nepela Memorial	5th	5th	
CS Tallinn Trophy			5th
CS Warsaw Cup	5th		
Bavarian Open		3rd	
NRW Trophy		2nd	
Open d'Andorra	1st		
Volvo Open Cup		2nd	
National
German Champ.	1st	1st	1st
Olympics			7th T 8th P
TBD = Assigned; WD = Withdrew

=== Single skating for Germany ===
International
Event	08–09	09–10	10–11	11–12	12–13	13–14	14–15
CS Golden Spin							18th
CS Warsaw Cup							8th
Challenge Cup							10th
NRW Trophy							14th
International: Junior
JGP Croatia					14th		
JGP Czech Rep.						6th	
JGP France					11th		
JGP Poland						12th	
Bavarian Open					3rd J	8th J	
Challenge Cup						3rd J	
Printemps						2nd J	
Merano Cup				2nd J			
NRW Trophy				7th J		8th J	
Warsaw Cup					1st J		
National
German Champ.	13th J	6th J	4th J	3rd J	1st J	1st J	6th
J = Junior level

== TV ==
=== Dancing On Ice ===
Joti Polizoakis became known nationwide while appearing as a professional Dancer in the first season of Dancing On Ice in 2019. Sarah Lombardi was his partner in the first season, and together they won the first season.

One year later, he was partnered with Lina Larissa Strahl for the second season of Dancing On Ice. Once again, Polizoakis made it to the final as a pro and finished in third place with Lina Larissa Strahl.

=== Other projects ===
On May 16, 2020, Polizoakis performed as a dancer at the Free European Song Contest. Since then, he has appeared as a dancer in many music videos.

In the fall of 2020, Polizoakis shot his first short movie as an actor.

Series	Celebrity partner	Place
4	Sarah Lombardi	1st
5	Lina Larissa Strahl	3rd
