= Kavita Lorenz =

German ice dancer

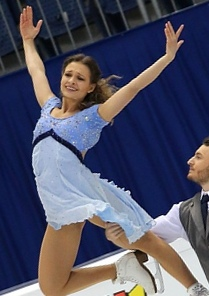
- Lorenz in 2016

Personal information
- Born: 5 September 1995 (age 31) Berlin, Germany
- Height: 1.56 m (5 ft 1 in)

Figure skating career
- Country: Germany
- Partner: Joti Polizoakis
- Coach: Marina Zueva, Massimo Scali, Oleg Epstein, Martin Skotnický
- Skating club: EC Oberstdorf
- Began skating: 2000
- Retired: 10 May 2018

Kavita Lorenz (born 5 September 1995) is a German former competitive ice dancer. With her skating partner, Joti Polizoakis, she is a three-time German national champion (2016–2018) and has competed in the final segment at four ISU Championships.

== Personal life ==
Lorenz was born on 5 September 1995 in Berlin. She married Lithuanian ice dancer Deividas Stagniunas.

== Career ==
Lorenz began learning to skate in 2000. As a single skater, she was coached by Michael Huth in Oberstdorf. She placed 9th at the 2010 German Junior Championships and 11th at the 2011 German Championships.

In 2012, Lorenz teamed up with Ukraine's Yevhen Kholoniuk to compete in ice dancing. They won the bronze medal at the 2013 German Championships.

=== Partnership with Polizoakis ===
In the spring of 2015, Lorenz teamed up with Joti Polizoakis, whom she had known for many years. They were coached by Igor Shpilband and Martin Skotnický in Novi, Michigan.

Making their international debut, Lorenz/Polizoakis finished fourth at the 2015 Nebelhorn Trophy, a Challenger Series (CS) event. They placed fifth at the 2015 Ondrej Nepela Trophy (CS), first at the 2015 Open d'Andorra, and fifth at the 2015 Warsaw Cup (CS). In December, they won the German national title ahead of Katharina Müller / Tim Dieck and were selected to represent Germany at the 2016 European Championships in Bratislava, Slovakia. At Europeans in January, Lorenz/Polizoakis placed 13th in the short dance to qualify for the free, where they ranked 15th, resulting in a final placement of 14th at their first ISU Championship. In March, they qualified for the final segment at the 2016 World Championships in Boston by placing 18th in the short dance and went on to finish 17th overall. They ended their partnership in April 2016, but announced in June that they would continue skating together. Lorenz announced her competitive retirement on 10 May 2018.

== Programs ==
(with Polizoakis)

Season	Short dance	Free dance
2017–18	Salsa: Aguanile by Marc Anthony; Rhumba: Mil Pasos (Remix); Samba: Magalenha by Sérgio Mendes	Pride & Prejudice (soundtrack) by Dario Marianelli & Jean-Yves Thibaudet
2016–17	Blues: Come Together; Hip hop: Black or White remix by Michael Jackson	Malagueña by Roni Benise; Jeux Interdits Narcisco Yepes; Jaleo by Louis Winsberg; Poeta by Vicente Amigo
2015–16	Waltz, Polka, Waltz, Foxtrot, March: The Sound of Music by Richard Rodgers	Amélie by Yann Tiersen

== Competitive highlights ==
GP: Grand Prix; CS: Challenger Series

=== With Polizoakis ===
International
Event	2015–16	2016–17	2017–18
Olympics			16th
Olympic Team Event			7th
World Champ.	17th	19th	16th
European Champ.	14th	14th	WD
GP Skate Canada			8th
CS Golden Spin		4th	9th
CS Nebelhorn Trophy	4th	5th	3rd
CS Nepela Memorial	5th	5th	
CS Tallinn Trophy			5th
CS Warsaw Cup	5th		
Bavarian Open		3rd	
NRW Trophy		2nd	
Open d'Andorra	1st		
Volvo Open Cup		2nd	
National
German Champ.	1st	1st	1st
Team events
Olympics			7th T

=== With Kholoniuk ===
National
Event	2012–13
German Championships	3rd

=== Single skating ===
National
Event	2009–10	2010–11
German Championships	9th J	11th
