= Lea Johanna Dastich =

German figure skater

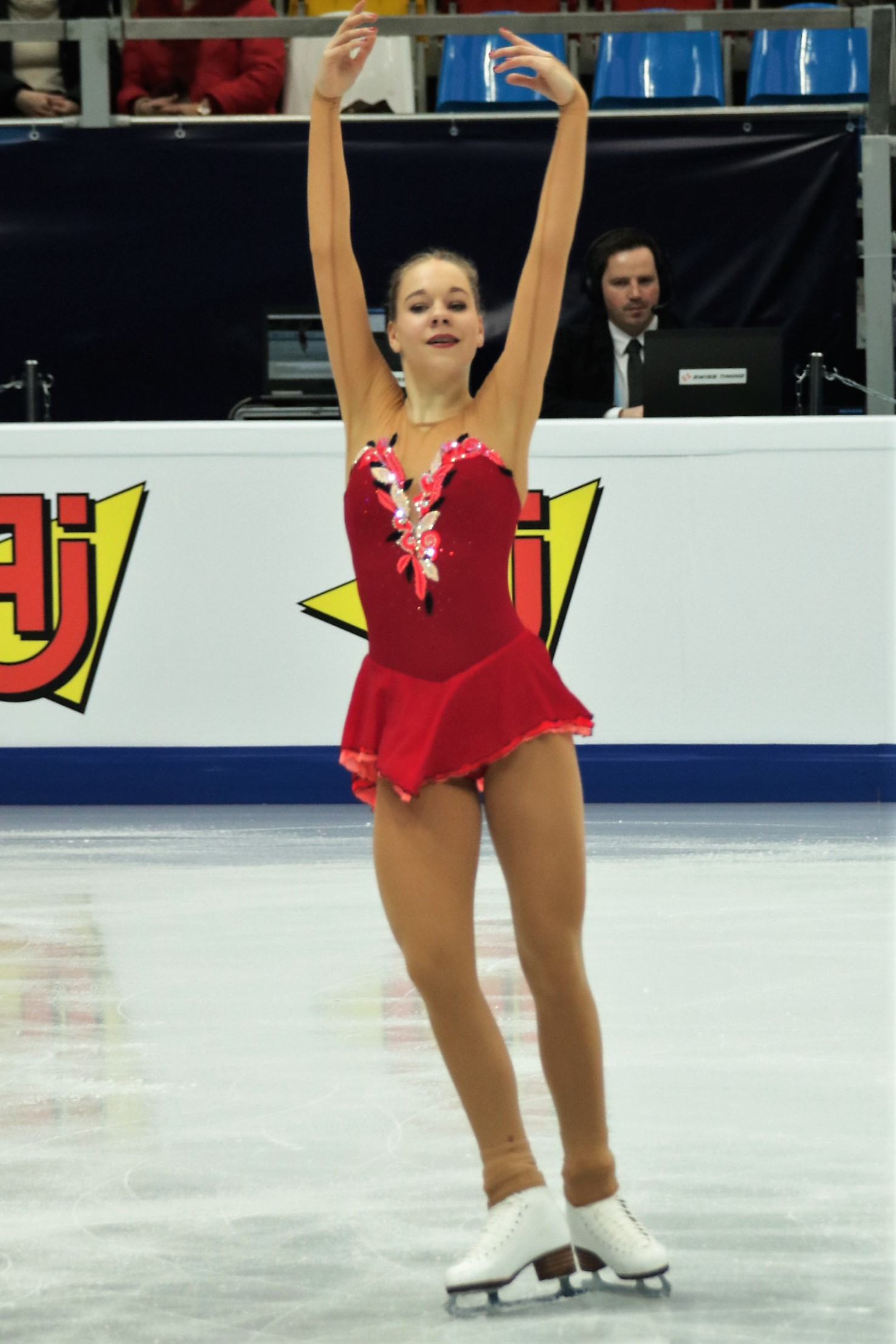
- Dastich at the 2018 European Championships

Personal information
- Born: 30 April 2000 (age 26) Dresden, Germany
- Height: 1.70 m (5 ft 7 in)

Figure skating career
- Country: Germany
- Coach: Anett Pötzsch
- Skating club: Dresdner Eislauf-Club e.V.
- Began skating: 2003
- Retired: January 5, 2022

Lea Johanna Dastich (born 30 April 2000) is a retired German figure skater. She is a two-time Bavarian Open bronze medalist (2016, 2017) and a two-time German national medalist (silver in 2017, bronze in 2018). She has qualified to the final segment at four ISU Championships and finished in the top ten twice (2017 Junior Worlds, 2018 Junior Worlds).

== Career ==
=== Early years ===
Dastich began learning to skate in 2003. In the 2012–2013 season, she competed internationally in the advanced novice ranks, winning bronze at the 2012 NRW Trophy. In 2013–2014, she began appearing in junior internationals.

=== 2014–2015 season ===
Dastich received her first ISU Junior Grand Prix (JGP) assignments in the 2014–2015 season; she placed 8th in France and 7th in Germany. In January 2015, she won the German national junior title and the silver medal at the European Youth Olympic Festival in Dornbirn, Austria.

=== 2015–2016 season ===
Making her senior international debut, Dastich finished 14th at the Nebelhorn Trophy, an ISU Challenger Series event in September 2015. She finished fourth at the German Championships. In February 2016, she won her first senior international medal – bronze at the Bavarian Open. In March, she represented Germany at the 2016 World Junior Championships in Debrecen, Hungary. She placed 18th in the short program, 10th in the free skate, and 12th overall. During the season, she was coached by Anett Pötzsch in Dresden.

=== 2016–2017 season ===
In December 2016, Dastich received the senior silver medal at the German Championships, having finished second to Nathalie Weinzierl. In February 2017, she repeated as the bronze medalist at the Bavarian Open. The following month, Dastich placed 8th at the 2017 World Junior Championships, scoring personal bests in every segment of the competition.

=== 2017–2018 season ===
Competing in her fourth JGP season, Dastich placed 8th in Austria and 6th in Croatia in September. In January, she qualified to the final segment and finished 16th overall at the 2018 European Championships in Moscow, Russia. In March, she placed 10th at the 2018 World Junior Championships in Sofia, Bulgaria.

=== 2018–2019 and 2019–2020 seasons ===
Dastich did not compete due to an injury.

=== 2020-2021 Season: Return ===
Dastich was slated to make her return to competition at the 2020 CS Nebelhorn Trophy but withdrew prior to the event.

== Programs ==
Season	Short program	Free skating
2020–2021	Everybody Wants to Rule the World by Tears for Fears performed by Cinematic Pop	The Greatest Showman by Benj Pasek, Justin Paul; Never Enough; The Greatest Showman Medley performed by Lindsey Stirling; This Is Me
2018–2019	La La Land by Justin Hurwitz	The Greatest Showman by Benj Pasek, Justin Paul; Never Enough; The Greatest Showman Medley performed by Lindsey Stirling; This Is Me
2017–2018	La La Land by Justin Hurwitz	West Side Story by Leonard Bernstein
2016–2017	Pina by Jun Miyake, Thom Hanreich; Lilies of the Valley; Pina; Shake It	West Side Story by Leonard Bernstein
2015–2016	Pina by Jun Miyake, Thom Hanreich; Lilies of the Valley; Pina; Shake It	Extremely Loud & Incredibly Close by Alexandre Desplat
2014–2015	Gigi by Frederick Loewe	Extremely Loud & Incredibly Close by Alexandre Desplat
2013–2014	Gigi by Frederick Loewe	The Addams Family by Marc Shaiman
2012–2013	How to Train Your Dragon by John Powell	The Addams Family by Marc Shaiman

== Competitive highlights ==
CS: Challenger Series; JGP: Junior Grand Prix

International
Event	13–14	14–15	15–16	16–17	17–18
Europeans					16th
CS Budapest					
CS Golden Spin					7th
CS Lombardia					7th
CS Nebelhorn			14th		
CS Tallinn Trophy					6th
CS Warsaw Cup					
Bavarian Open			3rd	3rd	
International: Junior
Junior Worlds			12th	8th	10th
JGP Austria					8th
JGP Croatia					6th
JGP France		8th			
JGP Germany		7th		8th	
JGP Slovenia				11th	
JGP U.S.			15th		
EYOF		2nd			
Denkova-Staviski			2nd		
Golden Bear				4th	
GP Bratislava			1st		
NRW Trophy	7th	3rd	2nd	2nd	
Ice Challenge		1st			
Hellmut Seibt	1st	1st			
Tirnavia Ice Cup	1st				
Volvo Open Cup		2nd			
Warsaw Cup	2nd				
National
German Champ.	4th J	1st J	4th	2nd	3rd
