= Figure skating at the 2026 Winter Olympics – Ice dance =

Ice dance at the XXV Olympic Winter Games
- Venue: Milano Ice Skating Arena; Milan, Italy
- Dates: 9 and 11 February 2026
- Competitors: 23 teams from 15 nations
- Winning score: 225.82 points

Medalists
1st place, gold medalist(s)		Laurence Fournier Beaudry and Guillaume Cizeron	France
2nd place, silver medalist(s)		Madison Chock and Evan Bates	United States
3rd place, bronze medalist(s)		Piper Gilles and Paul Poirier	Canada

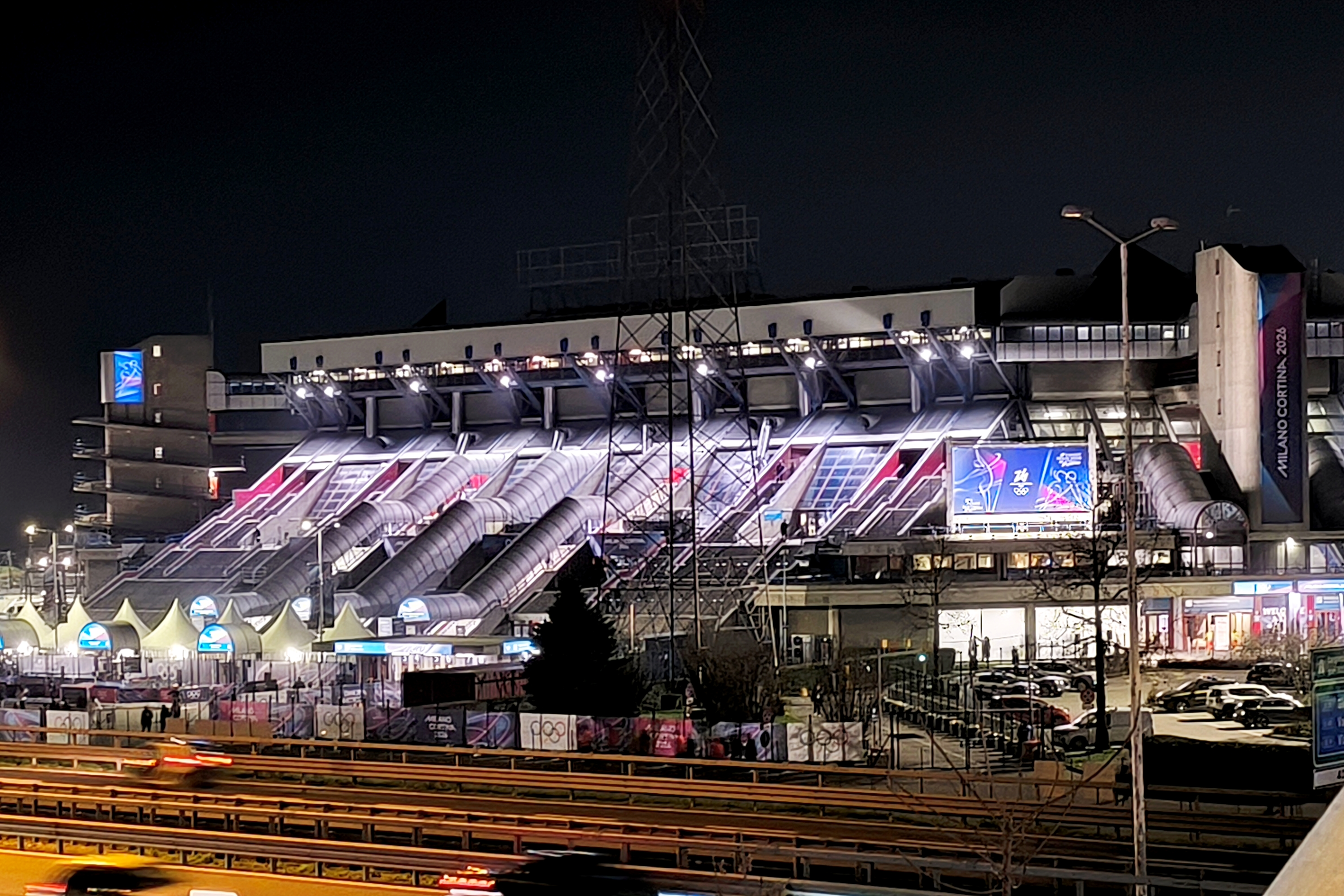
The figure skating events at the 2026 Winter Olympics were held at the Milano Ice Skating Arena in Milan, Italy.

The ice dance competition at the 2026 Winter Olympics was held on 9 and 11 February 2026 at the Milano Ice Skating Arena in Milan, Italy, and featured 23 teams from 15 nations. Laurence Fournier Beaudry and Guillaume Cizeron of France won the gold medals, Madison Chock and Evan Bates of the United States won the silver, and Piper Gilles and Paul Poirier of Canada won the bronze. This was Cizeron's second consecutive Olympic victory in ice dance, as he was also the 2022 Winter Olympic champion with his previous partner, Gabriella Papadakis. This was Fournier Beaudry and Cizeron's first season skating together. Controversy arose over Fournier Beaudry and Cizeron's win when an examination of the scores given by the French judge appeared to reveal some impropriety, as well as a book published by Papadakis shortly before the Olympics began that alleged a history of abusive behavior on the part of Cizeron.

== Background ==
In October 2023, the International Olympic Committee suspended the Olympic Committee of Russia. The skating federations of Russia and Belarus were each permitted to nominate one skater or team from each discipline to participate at the Skate to Milano as a means to qualify for the 2026 Winter Olympics as Individual Neutral Athletes. Each nominee was required to pass a special screening process to assess whether they had displayed any active support for the 2022 Russian invasion of Ukraine or had any contractual links to the Russian or Belarusian military. No ice dance teams from either Russia or Belarus competed at the 2026 Winter Olympics.

The ice dance event was one of five figure skating competitions contested at the 2026 Winter Olympics in Milan, Italy. It was held at the Milano Ice Skating Arena over two days: the rhythm dance took place on 9 February and the free dance took place on 11 February. The competition featured 23 teams from 15 nations. Madison Chock and Evan Bates of the United States entered the competition as the presumptive favorites to win. They had been part of the American team that won the team event, which had ended just one day before the ice dance competition began, having performed both the rhythm dance and free dance. Chock and Bates were three-time world champions, seven-time U.S. national champions, and held world records in ice dance. Their strongest competitors were expected to be Laurence Fournier Beaudry and Guillaume Cizeron of France. Cizeron had competed for years with Gabriella Papadakis, winning five World Championship titles and gold at the 2022 Winter Olympics before they ended their partnership in December 2024. Fournier Beaudry had competed for Canada with Nikolaj Sørensen before Sørensen received a six-year suspension from competitive skating in October 2024. Fournier Beaudry and Cizeron had announced their new partnership in March 2025 with a stated goal of competing at the 2026 Winter Olympics. Fournier Beaudry and Cizeron had most recently won the 2026 European Figure Skating Championships.

== Qualification ==
Eighteen quota spots in the ice dance event were awarded based on the results at the 2025 World Figure Skating Championships. An additional four spots were awarded at the Skate to Milano. Finland had originally qualified two quota spots at the World Championships. However, when Yuka Orihara was unable to obtain Finnish citizenship, Finland relinquished their second quota spot. The spot was reallocated to Sweden; Milla Ruud Reitan and Nikolaj Majorov became the first Swedish ice dance team to qualify for the Winter Olympics.

Quota spots in ice dance
Event	Teams per NOC	Qualifying NOCs	Total
2025 World Championships	3	Canada; United States	18
2025 World Championships	2	Czech Republic; ~~Finland~~; France; Great Britain	18
2025 World Championships	1	Finland; Italy; Spain; Georgia; Germany; South Korea	18
Skate to Milano	1	Lithuania; Australia; Spain; China; Sweden	5
Total			23

== Required performance elements ==
Couples in ice dance performed their rhythm dances on 9 February. Lasting 2 minutes 50 seconds (+/− 10 seconds), the theme of the rhythm dance this season was "music, dance styles, and feeling of the 1990s". Examples of applicable dance styles and music included pop, Latin, house, techno, hip-hop, and grunge. The rhythm dance had to include the following elements: one pattern dance step sequence, one choreographic rhythm sequence, one dance lift, one set of sequential twizzles, and one step sequence.

The twenty highest-scoring teams performed their free dances on 11 February. Lasting 4 minutes (+/− 10 seconds), the free dance had to include the following elements: three dance lifts, one dance spin, one set of synchronized twizzles, one step sequence in hold, one step sequence while on one skate and not in hold, and three choreographic elements.

== Judging ==
Skaters were judged according to the required technical elements of their program (such as choreographic elements), as well as the overall presentation of their program, based on three program components (skating skills, presentation, and composition). Each technical element in a figure skating performance was assigned a predetermined base point value and scored by a panel of nine judges on a scale from −5 to +5 based on the quality of its execution. Each Grade of Execution (GOE) from –5 to +5 was assigned a value as indicated on the Scale of Values. For example, a curve lift (level 4) was worth a base value of 5.45 points, and a GOE of +3 was worth 1.44 points, so a curve lift (level 4) with a GOE of +3 earned 6.89 points. The judging panel's GOE for each element was determined by calculating the trimmed mean (the average after discarding the highest and lowest scores). The panel's scores for all elements were added together to generate a Total Elements Score. At the same time, the judges evaluated each performance based on the five aforementioned program components and assigned each a score from 0.25 to 10 in 0.25-point increments. The judging panel's final score for each program component was also determined by calculating the trimmed mean. Those scores were then multiplied by the factor shown on the chart below; the results were added together to generate a total Program Component Score.

Program component factoring
Discipline	Rhythm dance	Free dance
Ice dance	1.33	2.00

Deductions were applied for certain violations, such as time infractions or falls. The Total Elements Score and Program Component Score were then added together, minus any deductions, to generate a final performance score for each team.

== Results ==
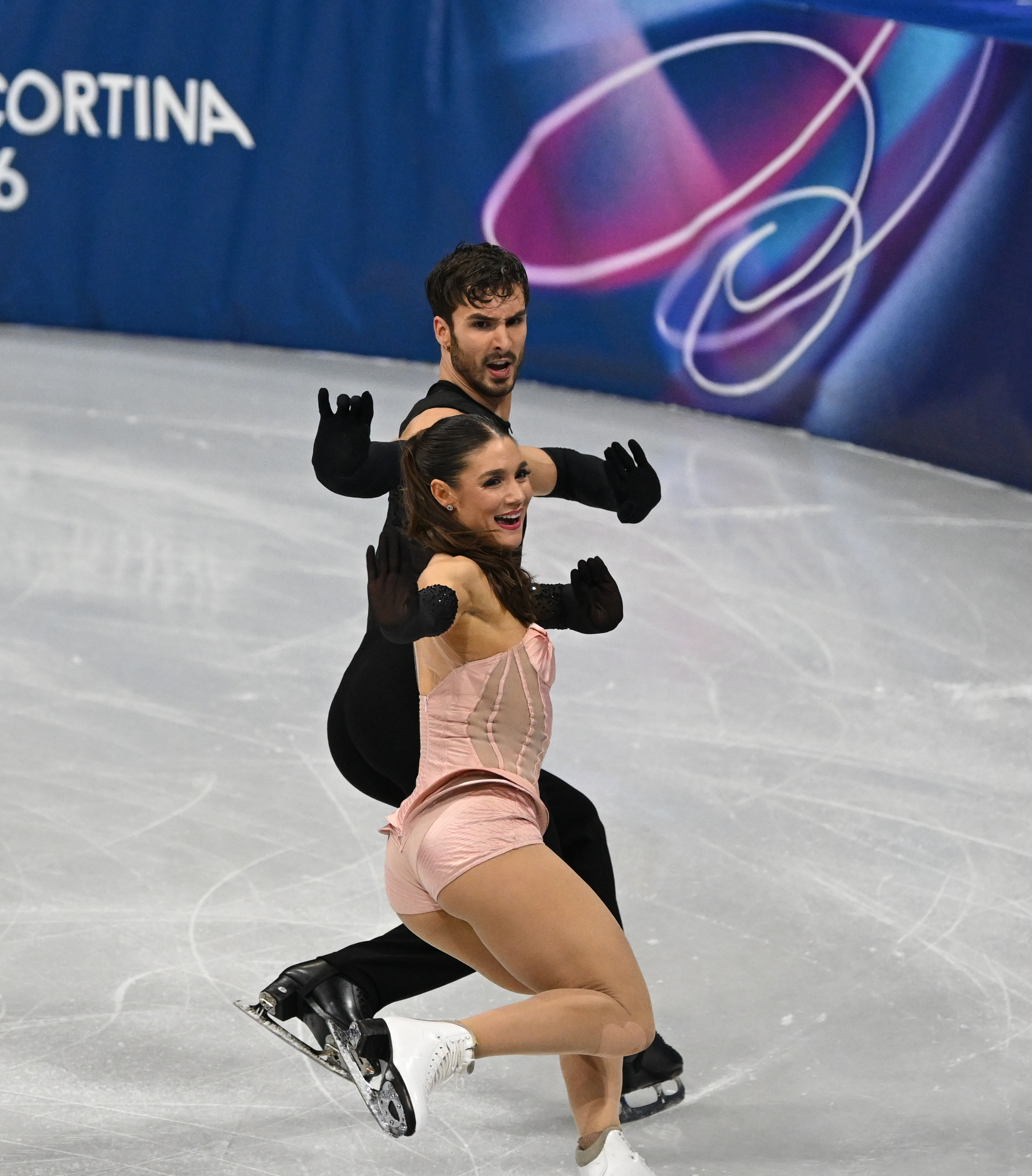
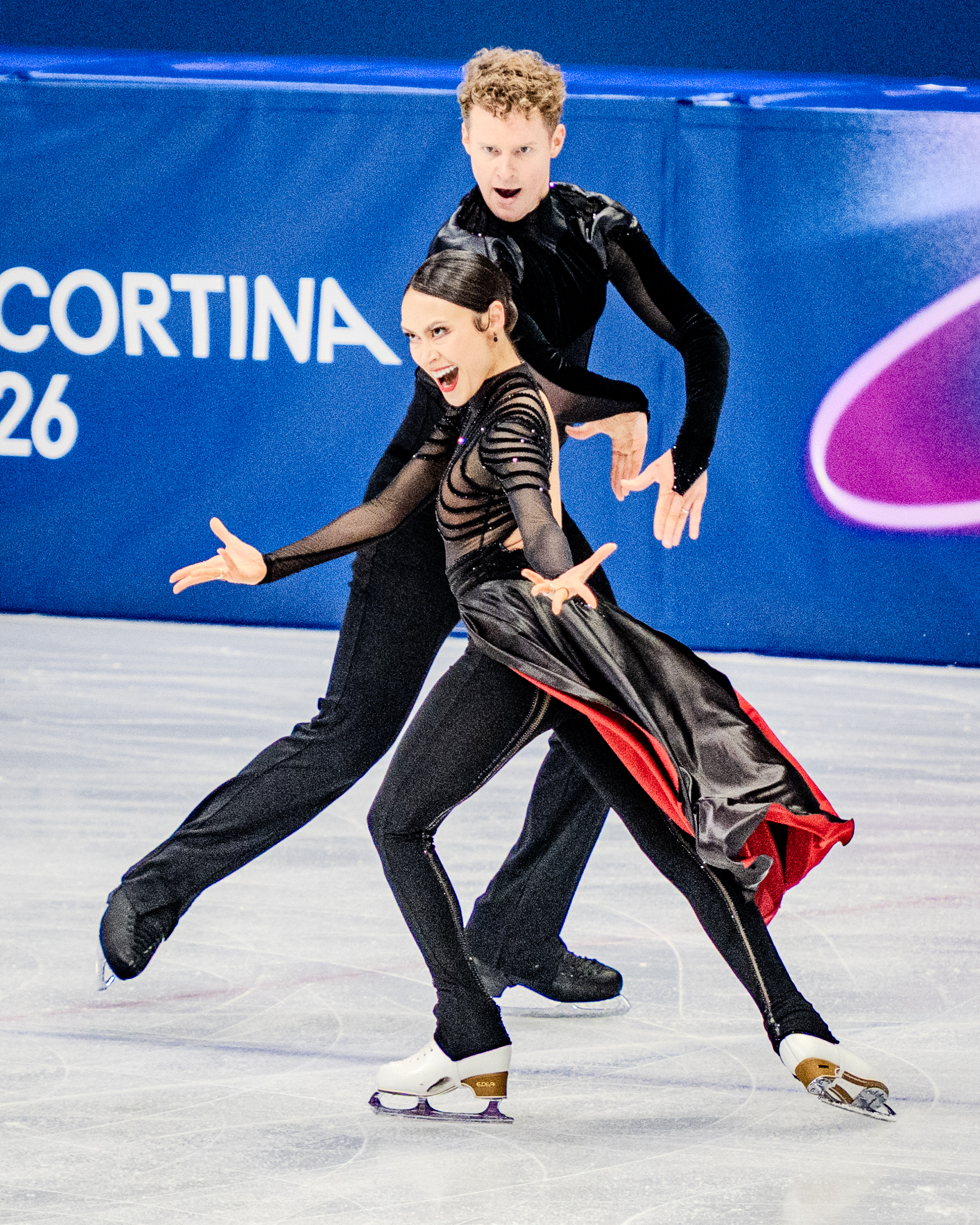
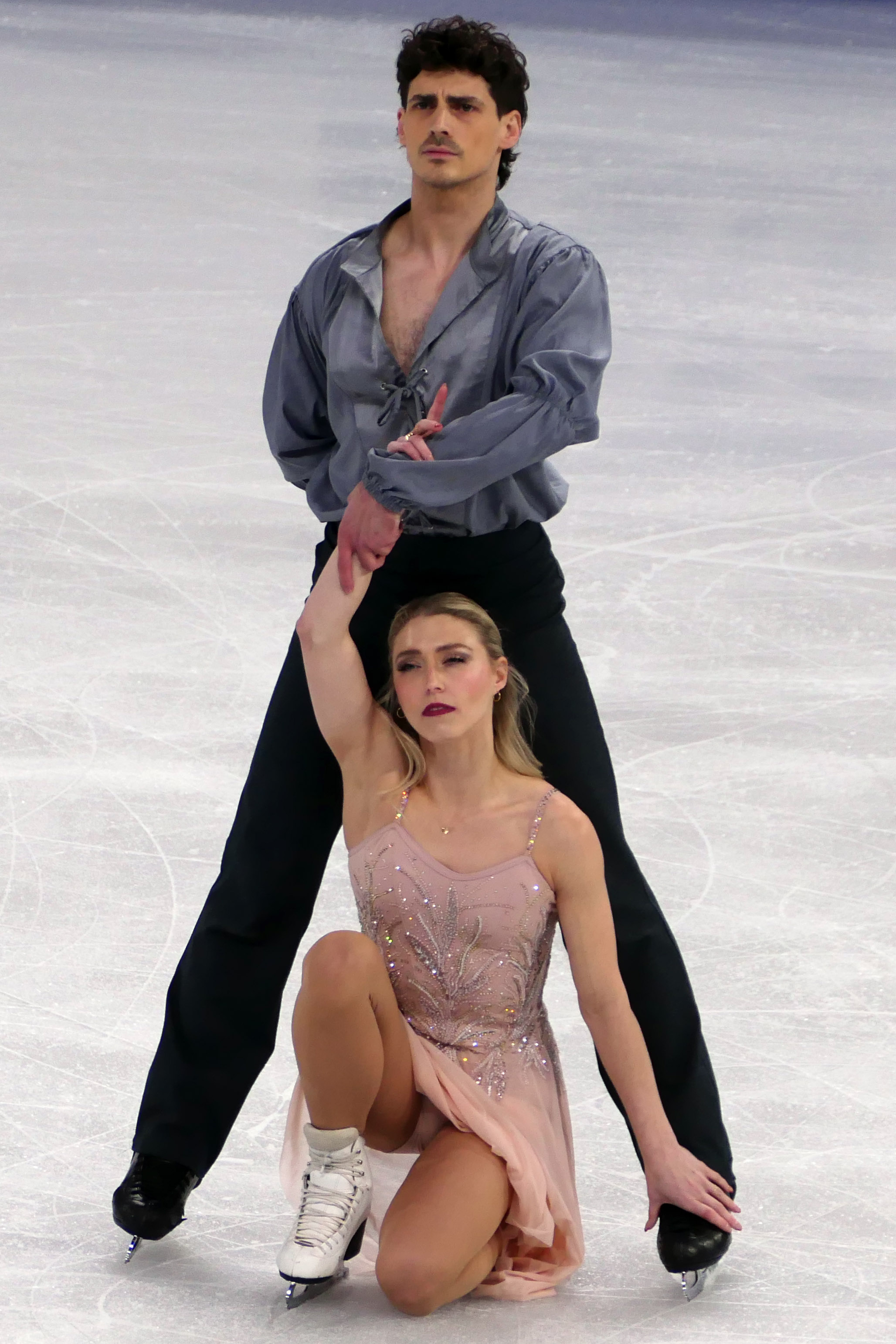
The gold, silver, and bronze medalists from the ice dance event at the 2026 Winter Olympics (from left to right):
Laurence Fournier Beaudry and Guillaume Cizeron of France (gold); Madison Chock and Evan Bates of the United States (silver); and Piper Gilles and Paul Poirier of Canada (bronze)

Code key

- TSS – Total Segment Score
- TES – Total Elements Score
- PCS – Program Component Score
- CO – Composition
- PR – Presentation
- SS – Skating skills
- DED – Deductions

=== Rhythm dance ===
The rhythm dance was held on 9 February. Madison Chock and Evan Bates of the United States finished behind Laurence Fournier Beaudry and Guillaume Cizeron of France. Fournier Beaudry and Cizeron set a new personal-best score in the rhythm dance, a score which was seen by some as controversial, as they were notably out of sync during their twizzle sequence. Chock and Bates, on the other hand, received a downgrade on their pattern dance step sequence, leaving them in second place. Piper Gilles and Paul Poirier of Canada finished in third place.

Rhythm dance results
Pl.	Team	Nation	TSS	TES	PCS	CO	PR	SS
1	Laurence Fournier Beaudry; Guillaume Cizeron	France	90.18	51.94	38.24	9.64	9.54	9.57
2	Madison Chock; Evan Bates	United States	89.72	51.54	38.18	9.64	9.64	9.43
3	Piper Gilles; Paul Poirier	Canada	86.18	49.41	36.77	9.21	9.29	9.14
4	Lilah Fear; Lewis Gibson	Great Britain	85.47	49.03	36.44	9.14	9.29	8.96
5	Charlène Guignard; Marco Fabbri	Italy	84.28	47.83	36.45	9.11	9.18	9.11
6	Emilea Zingas; Vadym Kolesnik	United States	83.53	48.27	35.26	8.79	8.93	8.79
7	Allison Reed; Saulius Ambrulevičius	Lithuania	82.95	47.86	35.09	8.82	8.89	8.68
8	Evgeniia Lopareva; Geoffrey Brissaud	France	82.25	46.83	35.42	8.86	8.89	8.89
9	Marjorie Lajoie; Zachary Lagha	Canada	79.66	45.41	34.25	8.64	8.61	8.50
10	Olivia Smart; Tim Dieck	Spain	78.53	44.52	34.01	8.54	8.57	8.46
11	Christina Carreira; Anthony Ponomarenko	United States	78.15	44.34	33.81	8.50	8.46	8.46
12	Juulia Turkkila; Matthias Versluis	Finland	77.96	44.38	33.58	8.39	8.43	8.43
13	Diana Davis; Gleb Smolkin	Georgia	77.15	43.23	33.92	8.57	8.54	8.39
14	Natálie Taschlerová; Filip Taschler	Czech Republic	75.33	43.07	32.26	8.04	8.18	8.04
15	Marie-Jade Lauriault; Romain Le Gac	Canada	74.35	42.38	31.97	8.11	8.07	7.86
16	Phebe Bekker; James Hernandez	Great Britain	72.46	41.63	30.83	7.75	7.79	7.64
17	Kateřina Mrázková; Daniel Mrázek	Czech Republic	72.09	40.50	31.59	7.96	7.93	7.86
18	Holly Harris; Jason Chan	Australia	67.75	37.78	29.97	7.57	7.50	7.46
19	Milla Ruud Reitan; Nikolaj Majorov	Sweden	67.31	37.71	29.60	7.50	7.46	7.29
20	Sofía Val; Asaf Kazimov	Spain	64.98	35.87	29.11	7.39	7.25	7.25
21	Wang Shiyue; Liu Xinyu	China	64.76	36.36	28.40	7.14	7.14	7.07
22	Hannah Lim; Ye Quan	South Korea	64.69	34.28	30.41	7.75	7.57	7.54
23	Jennifer Janse van Rensburg; Benjamin Steffan	Germany	63.67	33.66	30.01	7.68	7.43	7.46

=== Free dance ===
The free dance was held on 11 February. Laurence Fournier Beaudry and Guillaume Cizeron emerged victorious, having taken the lead over Madison Chock and Evan Bates after the rhythm dance by a small margin. When asked about preparing for the Olympics, Cizeron stated: "It's been quite the challenge... From the beginning we have tried to create a bubble and support each other. We think the love we have for each other and for the sport has drawn us through, kept our heads on our shoulders. Now we are enjoying those moments, we don't want them taken away from us."

Chock and Bates set a new season-best score in their free dance: a matador-themed routine featuring flamenco and paso doble elements set to "Paint It Black", with Chock as the matador and Bates as the bull. "It's definitely a little bittersweet because we are so, so happy with how we performed this week," Chock stated afterward. "We really gave it our all, and I wouldn't change anything about how we approached each performance, what we delivered in each performance. We really gave it our best." Piper Gilles and Paul Poirier finished in third place. "Our main focus for this Olympic Games was to create a moment for ourselves and to not focus on anything else," Gilles said. "And I think we truly created the moment that we wanted to and really let the judging be the judging and that's all we can do, but I'm really proud of what we did and how we represented ourselves."

Free dance results
Pl.	Team	Nation	TSS	TES	PCS	CO	PR	SS	DED
1	Laurence Fournier Beaudry; Guillaume Cizeron	France	135.64	77.06	58.58	9.79	9.82	9.68	0.00
2	Madison Chock; Evan Bates	United States	134.67	76.75	57.92	9.64	9.82	9.50	0.00
3	Piper Gilles; Paul Poirier	Canada	131.56	75.00	56.56	9.46	9.46	9.36	0.00
4	Charlène Guignard; Marco Fabbri	Italy	125.30	69.96	55.34	9.21	9.32	9.14	0.00
5	Emilea Zingas; Vadym Kolesnik	United States	123.19	69.25	53.94	9.00	9.11	8.86	0.00
6	Olivia Smart; Tim Dieck	Spain	122.96	69.18	53.78	9.07	9.11	8.71	0.00
7	Allison Reed; Saulius Ambrulevičius	Lithuania	121.71	68.93	52.78	8.79	8.89	8.71	0.00
8	Evgeniia Lopareva; Geoffrey Brissaud	France	121.43	68.41	53.02	8.79	8.79	8.93	0.00
9	Marjorie Lajoie; Zachary Lagha	Canada	120.14	67.50	52.64	8.86	8.75	8.71	0.00
10	Christina Carreira; Anthony Ponomarenko	United States	119.47	67.33	52.14	8.68	8.75	8.64	0.00
11	Diana Davis; Gleb Smolkin	Georgia	118.87	66.93	51.94	8.68	8.68	8.61	0.00
12	Lilah Fear; Lewis Gibson	Great Britain	118.85	65.15	53.70	9.07	9.07	8.71	0.00
13	Juulia Turkkila; Matthias Versluis	Finland	118.07	66.57	52.50	8.86	8.75	8.64	1.00
14	Marie-Jade Lauriault; Romain Le Gac	Canada	112.83	63.89	48.94	8.25	8.29	7.93	0.00
15	Natálie Taschlerová; Filip Taschler	Czech Republic	109.67	60.39	49.28	8.18	8.25	8.21	0.00
16	Kateřina Mrázková; Daniel Mrázek	Czech Republic	109.35	60.99	48.36	8.00	8.07	8.11	0.00
17	Holly Harris; Jason Chan	Australia	108.64	62.14	46.50	7.82	7.79	7.64	0.00
18	Phebe Bekker; James Hernandez	Great Britain	106.99	59.99	47.00	7.96	7.86	7.68	0.00
19	Sofía Val; Asaf Kazimov	Spain	100.25	56.83	43.42	7.32	7.25	7.14	0.00
20	Milla Ruud Reitan; Nikolaj Majorov	Sweden	97.74	53.52	44.22	7.36	7.39	7.36	0.00

=== Overall ===
Ice dance results
Rank	Team	Nation	Total	RD		FD	
1st place, gold medalist(s)	Laurence Fournier Beaudry; Guillaume Cizeron	France	225.82	1	90.18	1	135.64
2nd place, silver medalist(s)	Madison Chock; Evan Bates	United States	224.39	2	89.72	2	134.67
3rd place, bronze medalist(s)	Piper Gilles; Paul Poirier	Canada	217.74	3	86.18	3	131.56
4	Charlène Guignard; Marco Fabbri	Italy	209.58	5	84.28	4	125.30
5	Emilea Zingas; Vadym Kolesnik	United States	206.72	6	83.53	5	123.19
6	Allison Reed; Saulius Ambrulevičius	Lithuania	204.66	7	82.95	7	121.71
7	Lilah Fear; Lewis Gibson	Great Britain	204.32	4	85.47	12	118.85
8	Evgeniia Lopareva; Geoffrey Brissaud	France	203.68	8	82.25	8	121.43
9	Olivia Smart; Tim Dieck	Spain	201.49	10	78.53	6	122.96
10	Marjorie Lajoie; Zachary Lagha	Canada	199.80	9	79.66	9	120.14
11	Christina Carreira; Anthony Ponomarenko	United States	197.62	11	78.15	10	119.47
12	Juulia Turkkila; Matthias Versluis	Finland	196.03	12	77.96	13	118.07
13	Diana Davis; Gleb Smolkin	Georgia	196.02	13	77.15	11	118.87
14	Marie-Jade Lauriault; Romain Le Gac	Canada	187.18	15	74.35	14	112.83
15	Natálie Taschlerová; Filip Taschler	Czech Republic	185.00	14	75.33	15	109.67
16	Kateřina Mrázková; Daniel Mrázek	Czech Republic	181.44	17	72.09	16	109.35
17	Phebe Bekker; James Hernandez	Great Britain	179.45	16	72.46	18	106.99
18	Holly Harris; Jason Chan	Australia	176.39	18	67.75	17	108.64
19	Sofía Val; Asaf Kazimov	Spain	165.23	20	64.98	19	100.25
20	Milla Ruud Reitan; Nikolaj Majorov	Sweden	165.05	19	67.31	20	97.74
21	Wang Shiyue; Liu Xinyu	China	64.76	21	64.76	Did not advance to free dance	
22	Hannah Lim; Ye Quan	South Korea	64.69	22	64.69	Did not advance to free dance	
23	Jennifer Janse van Rensburg; Benjamin Steffan	Germany	63.67	23	63.67	Did not advance to free dance	

== Aftermath ==
The results of the ice dance event sparked backlash, with media outlets questioning how Laurence Fournier Beaudry and Guillaume Cizeron of France won despite notable errors with the twizzle sequences in both their rhythm dance and free dance. Controversy arose when an examination of the judges' results revealed discrepancies. The French judge, Jézabel Dabouis, had given Madison Chock and Evan Bates of the United States a total score of 129.74 in the free dance, which was not only the lowest score awarded by the nine judges, but also over 5.20 points lower than the average score of the remaining eight judges. At the same time, Dabouis had awarded Fournier Beaudry and Cizeron a total score of 137.45, which was the second-highest score awarded by the judges and also almost three points above the average score of the remaining judges. While the Finnish judge had also awarded Chock and Bates a relatively low score, that judge's scores were relatively consistent amongst all of the couples. A spokesperson from the International Skating Union (ISU) responded to the outcry: "It is normal for there to be a range of scores given by different judges in any panel and a number of mechanisms are used to mitigate these variations. The ISU has full confidence in the scores given and remains completely committed to fairness."

== Controversy ==
On 15 January 2026, Gabriella Papadakis released her memoir, So as Not to Disappear (French: Pour Ne Pas Disparaître), in which, among other things, she alleged a history of controlling and abusive behavior on the part of Guillaume Cizeron. Cizeron responded by issuing a cease-and-desist that led to Papadakis losing her job as an ice dance commentator for NBC. Additionally, Netflix released a docuseries, Glitter & Gold: Ice Dancing, just prior to the Olympics; Laurence Fournier Beaudry and Cizeron were one of the couples featured. While the documentary did not address the details of Cizeron's split from Papadakis, it did address Fournier Beaudry's split from Nikolaj Sørensen and the details of his suspension. Fournier Beaudry has continued to support Sørensen, with whom she has been in a long-term relationship. The woman who had accused Sørensen of sexual assault made a statement to the Canadian Press: "The comments of the reigning Olympic champion [Cizeron] and a team in contention for the upcoming Olympic title carry weight, and using their voices to publicly undermine a survivor's truths further enforces the culture of silence in figure skating."

Christine Brennan, a sports columnist for USA Today, wrote of the results: "What an awful message the sport of figure skating just sent to sexual abuse survivors and victims, and parents who want their children to participate in a safe sport." Although Sørensen's suspension had been overturned on procedural grounds, he remained under investigation and was present in the Milano Ice Skating Arena on 11 February, where Fournier Beaudry and Cizeron were observed waving to him and he was seen whistling back.

== Works cited ==
- "Special Regulations & Technical Rules – Single & Pair Skating and Ice Dance 2024" (PDF). International Skating Union. Archived (PDF) from the original on 3 June 2025.
