= Sofía Val =

Spanish ice dancer (born 2004)

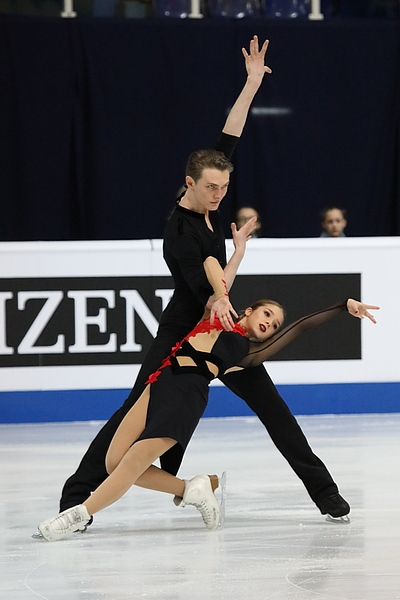
- Val and Colmor Jepsen at the 2019 World Junior Championships

Personal information
- Born: 14 November 2004 (age 22) Madrid, Spain
- Height: 1.64 m (5 ft 5 in)

Figure skating career
- Country: Spain
- Discipline: Ice dance
- Partner: Asaf Kazimov (since 2022); Nikita Vitryanyuk (2021–22); Linus Colmor Jepsen (2018–20)
- Coach: Kirill Khaliavin; Sara Hurtado; Ksenia Monko; Oscar Muñoz
- Skating club: SK International Ice Dance School
- Began skating: 2009

Medal record
Representing Spain
Spanish Championships
Silver medal – second place	2024 Logroño	Ice dance
Silver medal – second place	2025 Logroño	Ice dance
Silver medal – second place	2026 Jaca	Ice dance

Sofía Val (born 14 November 2004) is a Spanish ice dancer. With her current skating partner, Asaf Kazimov, she is the 2025 Winter World University Games champion, three-time national silver medalist, Skate to Milano bronze medalist, and 2026 Winter Olympian.

With her former partners, Linus Colmor Jepsen (2018, 2019) and Nikita Vitryanyuk (2021), she is a three-time Spanish junior national champion.

== Early life and education ==
Val was born on 14 November 2004 in Madrid, Spain to parents Virginia and Miguel Ángel. As of 2023, Val is a psychology student at the Universidad Camilo José Cela.

== Career ==
Val began learning how to skate in 2009.

=== Partnership with Linus Colmor Jepsen ===
==== 2018–19 season: Debut of Val/Colmor Jepsen ====
Val made the decision to transition from single skating to ice dance in 2018 after watching the sport on television and becoming inspired to try it. She relocated with her mother from their home in Torrelodones to Lyon, France in July 2018 to train under Muriel Zazoui and Olivier Schoenfelder, teamed with then 17-year-old Danish skater Linus Colmor Jepsen.

Val/Colmor Jepsen won their first Spanish junior national title in December 2018, just five months after forming their partnership. They next made their international junior debut at the Bavarian Open in February 2019 where they placed ninth of 22 in the junior ice dance category. The skaters concluded their season at the 2019 World Junior Championships the following month, narrowly missing the cutoff to advance to the free dance portion of the competition with a twenty-first-place finish in the rhythm dance.

==== 2019–20 season ====
Val/Colmor Jepsen opened their second competitive season on the ISU Junior Grand Prix (JGP) circuit, debuting at the 2019 JGP France with a sixteenth-place finish. They improved upon this placement at their second assignment, the 2019 JGP Croatia, finishing thirteenth.

In between the conclusion of their JGP season and their second Spanish Championships in December, Val/Colmor Jepsen competed at two international junior B events – the 2019 Open d'Andorra and the 2019 Bosphorus Cup, placing sixth and fifth respectively. The team capped off 2019 with their second junior national title.

Val/Colmor Jepsen's spring competition schedule mirrored that of their previous season, with appearances at the Bavarian Open and 2020 Junior Worlds. In Oberstdorf, Val/Colmor Jepsen finished seventh in the junior dance field, and at Junior Worlds the team managed to advance to the free dance with a twentieth-place finish in the rhythm dance, qualifying in the final progressing slot. The Spaniards placed seventeenth in the rhythm dance for an eighteenth-place finish overall.

Val announced the end of her partnership with Colmor Jepsen on June 13, 2020. She remained with her coaching team in Lyon with the intention of seeking a new partner.

=== Partnership with Nikita Vitryanyuk ===
==== 2020–21 season ====
Val remained without a partner for the majority of the 2020–21 season despite traveling abroad on a number of occasions for tryouts with potential prospects. In February 2021, Val tried out with Russian-Cypriot skater Nikita Vitryanyuk in Lyon, and the two skaters elected to form a partnership in March.

==== 2021–22 season: Debut of Val/Vitryanyuk ====
Val/Vitryanyuk debuted for Spain at the 2021 JGP Slovenia in September. There, the recently formed team placed sixth in the rhythm dance and eighth in the free dance for a sixth-place finish overall. They faltered in the free dance at their next JGP assignment, the 2021 JGP Austria, finishing eleventh overall.

Val/Vitryanyuk competed at several international junior B events throughout the fall of 2021, including the 2021 Ice Challenge where they won the bronze medal behind Canadian champions D'Alessandro/Waddell and Czech sibling team Mrázková/Mrázek. In December, the team won the junior ice dance title at the 2021 Spanish Figure Skating Championships, Val's third national title in ice dance.

Despite their recent success, Val/Vitryanyuk ended their partnership in January, citing a difference in opinion on training location. Vitryanyuk hoped to relocate their training base to Moscow, a move that was not feasible for Val and her family, leading the team to split.

=== Partnership with Asaf Kazimov ===
==== 2022–23 season: Debut of Val/Kazimov ====
Following the end of her short-lived partnership with Vitryanyuk, Val returned to her hometown of Madrid to train under former Olympic ice dancers Sara Hurtado and Kirill Khaliavin. She briefly formed a partnership with Russian skater Alexander Gnedin, but the pairing did not last. In August 2022, Hurtado reached out to Russian-German skater Asaf Kazimov, whose three-year partnership with Viktoriia Lopusova had recently ended, to arrange a tryout with Val. Kazimov traveled to Madrid in October for a five-day trial skate, and he and Val made the decision to team up for her native Spain not long after.

The new team was ineligible to compete internationally until January 2023 when Kazimov received his release from the German Ice Skating Union. Val/Kazimov debuted at the 2023 Challenge Cup at the end of February where they placed sixth of fourteen and secured their technical minimum scores to be eligible to compete at the 2023 World Championships.

At the World Championships in March, Val/Kazimov placed thirtieth in the rhythm dance and did not advance to the free dance portion of the competition.

==== 2023–24 season ====
Val/Kazimov opened their first full competitive season with a thirteenth-place finish at the 2023 CS Nepela Memorial. They set new personal bests in both segments of competition, as well as overall, at their next ISU Challenger Series assignment, the 2023 CS Budapest Trophy, where they placed sixth. The team won their first international medal a week later at the 2023 Trophée Métropole Nice, taking the title ahead of Lithuanian and Chinese teams Ramanauskaitė/Kizala and Xiao/He.

Competing at their first Spanish Championships in December, Val/Kazimov won the silver medal behind the new team Smart/Dieck. Despite the latter being the national champions, it was initially announced by the Spanish federation that Val/Kazimov would represent the country at the 2024 European and World Championships. Following controversy around the criteria used to arrive at this result, on December 27 the Spanish federation announced that Smart/Dieck would instead be given the country's lone World Championship berth, while Val/Kazimov would go to the European Championships.

In the rhythm dance at the European Championships in Kaunas, Val lost a level on her twizzle sequence, and both partners had low levels on their step sequences. They were twenty-third in the segment, and missed the cut for the free dance.

==== 2024–25 season ====
Val/Kazimov opened their second full competitive season with an eleventh-place finish at the 2024 CS Nebelhorn Trophy. They set new personal bests in both segments of competition, as well as overall, at their second ISU Challenger Series assignment, the ISU 2024 CS Tallinn Trophy, where they placed sixth. Besides, the team won their first medal of the season (silver) at the 2024 Pavel Roman Memorial, and gold at the 2025 Ephesus Cup in Izmir, Turkey. However, the gold medal won at the 2025 Winter University Games was very special for them.

Competing at the Spanish Championships in December, Val/Kazimov won for second consecutive year the silver medal behind the team Smart/Dieck.

==== 2025–26 season: Milano Cortina Olympics ====
Val/Kazimov began their season in August by winning gold at the 2025 International Ice Dance Dordrecht. They then competed at the ISU Skate to Milano, the final qualifying event for the 2026 Winter Olympics. "Qualifying for the Olympics was super meaningful for us. Not only for the fact that that it was our ticket to Milan, but also because only we know how much we worked and what we had to go through to get us there," said Val. At the event, Val/Kazimov won the bronze medal and with this result, won a second Olympic spot for Spain at the upcoming Olympics.

The duo subsequently competed on the 2025–26 Challenger Series, finishing sixth at the 2025 CS Denis Ten Memorial Challenge, seventh at the 2025 CS Warsaw Cup, and fifth at the 2025 CS Tallinn Trophy.

In December, Val/Kazimov won the silver medal at the 2026 Spanish Championships. The following month, they won gold at the 2026 Sofia Trophy and finished fourteenth at the 2026 European Championships in Sheffield, England, United Kingdom.

In February, they competed at the Olympics, placing 20th in the rhythm dance and 19th in the free dance for a 19th-place finish overall. “The Olympic Games were definitely a life-shaping experience for both of us," said Kazimov. “Until we arrived in Milan, I was not able to realize that we are going to be the part of it and can call ourselves Olympians.”

In spite of being confirmed for the 2026 World Championships in Prague, they were forced to withdraw due to Kazimov's surgery for appendicitis. “I started feeling a sharp pain in my stomach on March 10th, and after the first practice, it was getting worse,” said Kazimov. His recovery lasted approximately four weeks, and he returned to the ice in early April. As a result, the Olympics brought an end to their season.

== Programs ==
=== Ice dance with Asaf Kazimov ===
Season	Rhythm dance	Free dance	Exhibition
2026–2027	The Best Is Yet To Come; That's Life; New York, New York by Frank Sinatra	Tango per la liberta; Canto della liberta by Stefano Lentini	Les parapluies de Cherbourg by Patrick Fiori; La Bohème by Charles Aznavour
2025–2026	María; La Copa de la Vida; Livin' la Vida Loca by Ricky Martin choreo. by Kirill Khaliavin	Exogenesis: Symphony Part 3: Redemption Part 2: Cross-pollination Part 3: Redemption by Muse choreo. by Kirill Khaliavin	
2024–2025	I Was Made for Lovin' You by Kiss; Last Train to London by Electric Light Orchestra choreo. by Kirill Khaliavin	W.E.; Charms; Dance For Me Wallis by Abel Korzeniowski choreo. by Kirill Khaliavin	Les parapluies de Cherbourg by Patrick Fiori; La Bohème by Charles Aznavour
2023–2024	Top Gun; Playing with the Boys by Kenny Loggins; Take My Breath Away by Berlin; Danger Zone by Kenny Loggins choreo. by Kirill Khaliavin	SOFIA by Askjell, Aurora, and Iris; Turning Page by Sleeping at Last choreo. by Kirill Khaliavin	
2022–2023	Havana; Don't Go Yet by Camila Cabello choreo. by Kirill Khaliavin	SOFIA by Askjell, Aurora, and Iris; Turning Page by Sleeping at Last choreo. by Kirill Khaliavin	

=== Ice dance with Nikita Vitryanyuk ===
Season	Rhythm dance	Free dance
2021–2022	Stayin' Alive by Bee Gees; Careless Whisper by George Michael; Daddy Cool by Boney M. choreo. by Karine Arribert-Narce	Rain, In Your Black Eyes by Ezio Bosso; Paradise by Coldplay choreo. by Karine Arribert-Narce

=== Ice dance with Linus Colmor Jepsen ===
Season	Rhythm dance	Free dance
2019–2020	Quickstep: Overture; Foxtrot: It's De-Lovely; Charleston: Anything Goes (from Anything Goes) by Cole Porter choreo. by Olivier Schoenfelder	Treasure; Talking to the Moon; Runaway Baby by Bruno Mars choreo. by Olivier Schoenfelder
2018–2019	Tango: La Chanson des vieux amants performed by Novafonic Quartet; Flamenco: Farrucas by Pepe Romero choreo. by Marien de la Asuncion	Is That Alright?; Look What I Found; I'll Never Love Again (from A Star Is Born) performed by Lady Gaga choreo. by Marien de la Asuncion

== Competitive highlights ==
- JGP – Event of the ISU Junior Grand Prix Series
- CS – Event of the ISU Challenger Series
- TBD – Assigned
- WD – Withdrew from competition

=== Ice dance with Asaf Kazimov ===
Competition placements at senior level
Season	2022–23	2023–24	2024–25	2025–26	2026–27
Winter Olympics				19th	
World Championships	30th				
European Championships		23rd		14th	
Spanish Championships		2nd	2nd	2nd	
GP France					4th
GP Skate America					7th
CS Denis Ten Memorial				6th	
CS Nebelhorn Trophy			11th		
CS Nepela Memorial		13th			11th
CS Tallinn Trophy			6th	5th	
CS Warsaw Cup				7th	
CS Budapest Trophy		6th			
Challenge Cup	6th				
Ephesus Cup		1st	1st		
ICE Dance Dordrecht				1st	
Pavel Roman Memorial			2nd		
Skate to Milano				3rd	
Sofia Trophy				1st	
Trophée Métropole Nice		1st			
Winter University Games			1st		
Bosphorus Cup		3rd			

=== Ice dance with Nikita Vitryanyuk ===
International: Junior
Event	2021–22
JGP Austria	11th
JGP Slovenia	6th
Ice Challenge	3rd
Open d'Andorra	5th
Trophée Métropole Nice	4th
National
Spanish Champ.	1st J

=== Ice dance with Linus Colmor Jepsen ===
International: Junior
Event	2018–19	2019–20
Junior Worlds	21st	18th
JGP Croatia		13th
JGP France		16th
Bavarian Open	9th	7th
Bosphorus Cup		5th
Open d'Andorra		6th
National
Spanish Champ.	1st J	1st J

== Detailed results ==
=== Ice dance with Asaf Kazimov ===
ISU personal best scores in the +5/-5 GOE System
Segment	Type	Score	Event
Total	TSS	181.45	2025 CS Tallinn Trophy
Short program	TSS	70.59	2025 CS Tallinn Trophy
Short program	TES	40.07	2025 CS Tallinn Trophy
Short program	PCS	30.52	2025 CS Tallinn Trophy
Free skating	TSS	110.86	2025 CS Tallinn Trophy
Free skating	TES	63.56	2025 CS Tallinn Trophy
Free skating	PCS	47.30	2025 CS Tallinn Trophy

Results in the 2022–23 season
Date	Event	RD		FD		Total	
Date	Event	P	Score	P	Score	P	Score
Feb 23–26, 2023	(Netherlands) 2023 Challenge Cup	5	61.85	6	97.49	6	159.34
Mar 20–26, 2023	(Japan) 2023 World Championships	30	53.94	-	-	30	53.94

Results in the 2023–24 season
Date	Event	RD		FD		Total	
Date	Event	P	Score	P	Score	P	Score
Sep 28–30, 2023	(Slovakia) 2023 CS Nepela Memorial	13	56.96	13	86.92	13	143.88
Oct 13–15, 2023	(Hungary) 2023 CS Budapest Trophy	6	65.51	6	102.83	6	168.34
Oct 18–22, 2023	(France) 2023 Trophée Métropole Nice Côte d'Azur	1	60.34	1	95.55	1	155.89
Nov 27 – Dec 3, 2023	(Turkey) 2023 Bosphorus Cup	3	69.99	3	106.37	3	176.36
Dec 15–17, 2023	(Spain) 2024 Spanish Championships	2	70.71	2	108.08	2	178.79
Jan 8–14, 2024	(Lithuania) 2024 European Championships	23	58.04	-	-	23	58.04
Jan 25–28, 2024	(Turkey) 2024 Ephesus Cup	1	70.89	1	107.32	1	178.21

Results in the 2024–25 season
Date	Event	RD		FD		Total	
Date	Event	P	Score	P	Score	P	Score
Sep 19–21, 2024	(Germany) 2024 CS Nebelhorn Trophy	7	6404	12	91.02	11	155.06
Nov 8–10, 2024	(Czech Republic) 2024 Pavel Roman Memorial	2	69.54	2	104.24	2	173.78
Nov 12–17, 2024	(Estonia) 2024 CS Tallinn Trophy	8	66.67	6	103.83	6	170.50
Dec 12–15, 2024	(Spain) 2025 Spanish Championships	2	70.35	2	105.95	2	176.30
Jan 16–18, 2025	(Italy) 2025 Winter University Games	1	66.42	1	106.35	1	172.77

Results in the 2025–26 season
Date	Event	RD		FD		Total	
Date	Event	P	Score	P	Score	P	Score
Aug 16–17, 2025	(Netherlands) 2025 International ICE Dance Dordrecht	1	69.74	1	106.93	1	176.67
Sep 18–21, 2025	(China) 2025 ISU Skate to Milano	5	68.35	4	101.97	3	170.32
Oct 1–4, 2025	(Kazakhstan) 2025 CS Denis Ten Memorial Challenge	6	66.09	6	99.52	6	165.61
Nov 19–23, 2025	(Poland) 2025 CS Warsaw Cup	7	68.81	5	110.48	7	179.29
Nov 25–30, 2025	(Estonia) 2025 CS Tallinn Trophy	5	70.59	4	110.86	5	181.45
Dec 11–14, 2025	(Spain) 2026 Spanish Championships	2	72.12	2	118.05	2	190.17
Jan 6–11, 2026	(Bulgaria) 2026 Sofia Trophy	1	76.04	1	117.16	1	193.20
Jan 13–18, 2026	(United Kingdom) 2026 European Championships	15	67.11	14	106.62	14	173.73
Feb 9-11, 2026	(Italy) 2026 Winter Olympics	20	64.98	19	100.25	19	165.23

Results in the 2026–27 season
Date	Event	RD		FD		Total	
Date	Event	P	Score	P	Score	P	Score
Sep 24–27, 2026	(Slovakia) 2026 CS Nepela Memorial	9	69.87	11	98.61	11	168.48
Oct 23–25, 2026	2026 Grand Prix de France	5	64.78	4	101.21	4	165.99
Nov 13–15, 2026	(United States) 2026 Skate America	8	65.79	7	98.12	7	163.91
