= Asaf Kazimov =

Russian-German ice dancer (born 2000)

Personal information
- Native name: Асаф Казимович Казимов
- Full name: Asaf Kazimovich Kazimov
- Born: 12 March 2000 (age 26) Saint Petersburg, Russia
- Home town: Dortmund, Germany
- Height: 1.81 m (5 ft 11 in)

Figure skating career
- Country: Spain (since 2023); Germany (until 2023)
- Discipline: Ice dance
- Partner: Sofía Val (since 2022); Viktoriia Lopusova (2019–22); Lara Luft (2015–19); Diana Scheidt (until 2015)
- Coach: Kirill Khaliavin; Sara Hurtado; Ksenia Monko; Oscar Muñoz
- Skating club: SK International Ice Dance School
- Began skating: 2006

Medal record
Representing Spain
Spanish Championships
Silver medal – second place	2024 Logroño	Ice dance
Silver medal – second place	2025 Logroño	Ice dance
Silver medal – second place	2026 Jaca	Ice dance

Asaf Kazimovich Kazimov (Russian: Асаф Казимович Казимов; born 12 March 2000) is a Russian-born German-Spanish ice dancer who currently competes for Spain. With his skating partner, Sofía Val, he is the 2025 Winter World University Games champion, three-time national silver medalist, Skate to Milano bronze medalist, and 2026 Winter Olympian.

== Personal life ==
Kazimov was born on 12 March 2000 in Saint Petersburg, Russia. He also has a younger brother, Daniel. Kazimov and his family immigrated to Germany in 2012. He obtained a bachelor's degree in electrical engineering at the Technical University of Dortmund before earning a master's degree at the Technical University of Madrid. Additionally, he is able to speak Russian, German, Spanish, and English.

In September 2025, he was granted Spanish citizenship.

== Career ==
=== Early years ===
Kazimov began learning how to skate in 2006 in his native Saint Petersburg under the guidance of coach Elena Vlasova. Then he moved to a group led by Valentina Chebotareva, where he studied until he was eleven years old. Kazimov and his family emigrated from Russia to Germany in 2012, and there he took up the sport with his first competitive partner, Diana Scheidt. Scheidt/Kazimov competed as advanced novices both internationally and domestically during the 2014–15 season before splitting during the first half of 2015.

==== 2015–2019: Partnership with Lara Luft for Germany ====
Kazimov teamed up with his second skating partner, Lara Luft, in 2015. They competed for Germany for three seasons together, from 2016 to 2019, including three Junior Grand Prix assignments, a bronze medal in the junior ice dance category at the 2017 Christmas Cup, and a silver medal at the 2019 German junior national championship. Luft/Kazimov split in 2019.

==== 2019–2022: Partnership with Viktoriia Lopusova for Germany ====
Kazimov next formed a partnership with fellow Russian-born skater Viktoriia Lopusova, with whom he competed for three seasons from 2019 to 2022 and made his senior international debut. Lopusova/Kazimov competed at two junior international events during the 2019–20 season and won the bronze medal at the 2019 German junior national championship, but did not appear internationally or domestically during the 2020–21 season.

The team returned to make their senior international debut at the 2021 CS Nebelhorn Trophy, the final qualifying event to the 2022 Winter Olympics, where they finished fifteenth. They competed at six other international senior B events over the course of the 2021–22 season, and finished 4th at the 2021 German Championships.

=== Partnership with Sofía Val for Spain ===
==== 2022–23 season: Debut of Val/Kazimov ====
Lopusova/Kazimov split in September 2022, despite having prepared for the upcoming 2022–23 season. Following this, Kazimov's coach, Maurizio Margaglio helped him get in contact Spanish coach, Sara Hurtado, who in turn, asked Kazimov if he wanted to have a tryout with her then partnerless student, Sofía Val. Kazimov agreed to this proposal and flew to Madrid for a five-day tryout period that same month. The duo elected to team up for Val's native Spain not long after, and Kazimov relocated to Madrid to train under Hurtado and her former skating partner, Kirill Khaliavin.

The new team was ineligible to compete internationally until January 2023 when Kazimov received his release from the German Ice Skating Union. Val/Kazimov debuted at the 2023 Challenge Cup at the end of February where they placed sixth of 14 and secured their technical minimum scores to be eligible to compete at the 2023 World Championships.

At the World Championships in March, Val/Kazimov placed thirtieth in the rhythm dance and did not advance to the free dance portion of the competition.

==== 2023–24 season ====
Val/Kazimov opened their first full competitive season with a thirteenth-place finish at the 2023 CS Nepela Memorial. They set new personal bests in both segments of competition, as well as overall, at their next ISU Challenger Series assignment, the 2023 CS Budapest Trophy, where they placed sixth. The team won their first international medal a week later at the 2023 Trophée Métropole Nice, taking the title ahead of Lithuanian and Chinese teams Ramanauskaitė/Kizala and Xiao/He.

Competing at their first Spanish Championships in December, Val/Kazimov won the silver medal behind the new team Smart/Dieck. Despite the latter being the national champions, it was initially announced by the Spanish federation that Val/Kazimov would represent the country at the 2024 European and World Championships. Following controversy around the criteria used to arrive at this result, on 27 December the Spanish federation announced that Smart/Dieck would instead be given the country's lone World Championship berth, while Val/Kazimov would go to the European Championships.

In the rhythm dance at the European Championships in Kaunas, Val lost a level on her twizzle sequence, and both partners had low levels on their step sequences. They were twenty-third in the segment, and missed the cut for the free dance.

==== 2024–25 season ====
Val/Kazimov opened their second full competitive season with an eleventh-place finish at the 2024 CS Nebelhorn Trophy. They set new personal bests in both segments of competition, as well as overall, at their second ISU Challenger Series assignment, the ISU 2024 CS Tallinn Trophy, where they placed sixth. Besides, the team won their first medal of the season (silver) at the 2024 Pavel Roman Memorial, and gold at the 2025 Ephesus Cup in Izmir, Turkey. However, the gold medal won at the 2025 Winter University Games was very special for them.

Competing at the Spanish Championships in December, Val/Kazimov won for second consecutive year the silver medal behind the team Smart/Dieck.

==== 2025–26 season: Milano Cortina Olympics ====
Val/Kazimov began their season in August by winning gold at the 2025 International Ice Dance Dordrecht. They then competed at the ISU Skate to Milano, the final qualifying event for the 2026 Winter Olympics. "Qualifying for the Olympics was super meaningful for us. Not only for the fact that that it was our ticket to Milan, but also because only we know how much we worked and what we had to go through to get us there," said Val. At the event, Val/Kazimov won the bronze medal and with this result, won a second Olympic spot for Spain at the upcoming Olympics.

The duo subsequently competed on the 2025–26 Challenger Series, finishing sixth at the 2025 CS Denis Ten Memorial Challenge, seventh at the 2025 CS Warsaw Cup, and fifth at the 2025 CS Tallinn Trophy.

In December, Val/Kazimov won the silver medal at the 2026 Spanish Championships. The following month, they won gold at the 2026 Sofia Trophy and finished fourteenth at the 2026 European Championships in Sheffield, England, United Kingdom.

In February, they competed at the Olympics, placing 20th in the rhythm dance and 19th in the free dance for a 19th-place finish overall. “The Olympic Games were definitely a life-shaping experience for both of us," said Kazimov. “Until we arrived in Milan, I was not able to realize that we are going to be the part of it and can call ourselves Olympians.”

In spite of being confirmed for the 2026 World Championships in Prague, they were forced to withdraw due to Kazimov's surgery for appendicitis. “I started feeling a sharp pain in my stomach on March 10th, and after the first practice, it was getting worse,” said Kazimov. His recovery lasted approximately four weeks, and he returned to the ice in early April. As a result, the Olympics brought an end to their season.

== Programs ==
=== Ice dance with Sofía Val (for Spain) ===
Season	Rhythm dance	Free dance	Exhibition
2026–2027	The Best Is Yet To Come; That's Life; New York, New York by Frank Sinatra	Tango per la liberta; Canto della liberta by Stefano Lentini	Les parapluies de Cherbourg by Patrick Fiori; La Bohème by Charles Aznavour
2025–2026	María; La Copa de la Vida; Livin' la Vida Loca by Ricky Martin choreo. by Kirill Khaliavin	Exogenesis: Symphony Part 3: Redemption Part 2: Cross-pollination Part 3: Redemption by Muse choreo. by Kirill Khaliavin	
2024–2025	I Was Made for Lovin' You by Kiss; Last Train to London by Electric Light Orchestra choreo. by Kirill Khaliavin	W.E.; Charms; Dance For Me Wallis by Abel Korzeniowski choreo. by Kirill Khaliavin	Les parapluies de Cherbourg by Patrick Fiori; La Bohème by Charles Aznavour
2023–2024	Top Gun; Playing with the Boys by Kenny Loggins; Take My Breath Away by Berlin; Danger Zone by Kenny Loggins choreo. by Kirill Khaliavin	SOFIA by Askjell, Aurora, and Iris; Turning Page by Sleeping at Last choreo. by Kirill Khaliavin	
2022–2023	Havana; Don't Go Yet by Camila Cabello choreo. by Kirill Khaliavin	SOFIA by Askjell, Aurora, and Iris; Turning Page by Sleeping at Last choreo. by Kirill Khaliavin	

=== Ice dance with Viktoriia Lopusova (for Germany) ===
Season	Rhythm dance	Free dance
2022–2023	Rhumba: Temptation by Diana Krall; Samba: Timbale by Watazu choreo. by Adam Solya, Maurizio Margaglio	End Title (from The Godfather Part II); Parla più piano (from The Godfather) by Nino Rota choreo. by Luca Lanotte
2021–2022	Blues: I Guess That's Why They Call It the Blues; Disco: Victim of Love by Elton John choreo. by Matteo Zanni	Belonging II by Denis Stelmakh; Smallest Light by Ingrid Michaelson; Obscura by Christian Reindl; Shine a Light by Banners choreo. by Matteo Zanni

=== Ice dance with Lara Luft (for Germany) ===
Season	Rhythm dance	Free dance
2018–2019	Argentine Tango: Tango de Besame by Roni Benise; Waltz: Corazón de Oro by Lalo Schifrin choreo. by Mariana Kozlova, Alexander Tolstik	Say Something by A Great Big World, feat. Christina Aguilera; Six Breath, The Last Breath by Ezio Bosso choreo. by Mariana Kozlova, Alexander Tolstik
2017–2018	Cha Cha: Everybody Cha Cha by Cecil Jonni Lauro; Rhumba: La Playa by Chayanne; Samba: Tequila by Sonia & Selena choreo. by Mark Hanretty, Alexander Tolstik	Gimme That Swing! by Cissie Redgwick; After Dark by Tito & Tarantula; Rock It For Me by Caravan Palace choreo. by Mark Hanretty, Alexander Tolstik

== Competitive highlights ==
- JGP – Event of the ISU Junior Grand Prix Series
- CS – Event of the ISU Challenger Series
- TBD – Assigned
- WD – Withdrew from competition

=== Ice dance with Sofía Val (for Spain) ===
Competition placements at senior level
Season	2022–23	2023–24	2024–25	2025–26	2026–27
Winter Olympics				19th	
World Championships	30th				
European Championships		23rd		14th	
Spanish Championships		2nd	2nd	2nd	
GP France					4th
GP Skate America					7th
CS Denis Ten Memorial				6th	
CS Nebelhorn Trophy			11th		
CS Nepela Memorial		13th			11th
CS Tallinn Trophy			6th	5th	
CS Warsaw Cup				7th	
CS Budapest Trophy		6th			
Challenge Cup	6th				
Ephesus Cup		1st	1st		
ICE Dance Dordrecht				1st	
Pavel Roman Memorial			2nd		
Skate to Milano				3rd	
Sofia Trophy				1st	
Trophée Métropole Nice		1st			
Winter University Games			1st		
Bosphorus Cup		3rd			

=== Ice dance with Viktoriia Lopusova (for Germany) ===
International
Event	19–20	21–22
CS Nebelhorn Trophy		15th
CS Warsaw Cup		20th
Bavarian Open		8th
Challenge Cup		7th
Egna Dance Trophy		9th
Open d'Andorra		9th
Trophée Métropole Nice		10th
International: Junior
Golden Spin	10th	
Grand Prix of Bratislava	4th	
National
German Champ.	3rd J	4th

=== Ice dance with Lara Luft (for Germany) ===
International: Junior
Event	16–17	17–18	18–19
JGP Armenia			11th
JGP Austria		16th	
JGP Lithuania			10th
Bavarian Open	19th		
Christmas Cup			3rd
Ice Star		7th	
Mentor Toruń Cup			10th
Volvo Open Cup			11th
National
German Champ.			2nd J

== Detailed results ==
=== Ice dance with Sofía Val (for Spain) ===
ISU personal best scores in the +5/-5 GOE System
Segment	Type	Score	Event
Total	TSS	181.45	2025 CS Tallinn Trophy
Short program	TSS	70.59	2025 CS Tallinn Trophy
Short program	TES	40.07	2025 CS Tallinn Trophy
Short program	PCS	30.52	2025 CS Tallinn Trophy
Free skating	TSS	110.86	2025 CS Tallinn Trophy
Free skating	TES	63.56	2025 CS Tallinn Trophy
Free skating	PCS	47.30	2025 CS Tallinn Trophy

Results in the 2022–23 season
Date	Event	RD		FD		Total	
Date	Event	P	Score	P	Score	P	Score
Feb 23–26, 2023	(Netherlands) 2023 Challenge Cup	5	61.85	6	97.49	6	159.34
Mar 20–26, 2023	(Japan) 2023 World Championships	30	53.94	-	-	30	53.94

Results in the 2023–24 season
Date	Event	RD		FD		Total	
Date	Event	P	Score	P	Score	P	Score
Sep 28–30, 2023	(Slovakia) 2023 CS Nepela Memorial	13	56.96	13	86.92	13	143.88
Oct 13–15, 2023	(Hungary) 2023 CS Budapest Trophy	6	65.51	6	102.83	6	168.34
Oct 18–22, 2023	(France) 2023 Trophée Métropole Nice Côte d'Azur	1	60.34	1	95.55	1	155.89
Nov 27 – Dec 3, 2023	(Turkey) 2023 Bosphorus Cup	3	69.99	3	106.37	3	176.36
Dec 15–17, 2023	(Spain) 2024 Spanish Championships	2	70.71	2	108.08	2	178.79
Jan 8–14, 2024	(Lithuania) 2024 European Championships	23	58.04	-	-	23	58.04
Jan 25–28, 2024	(Turkey) 2024 Ephesus Cup	1	70.89	1	107.32	1	178.21

Results in the 2024–25 season
Date	Event	RD		FD		Total	
Date	Event	P	Score	P	Score	P	Score
Sep 19–21, 2024	(Germany) 2024 CS Nebelhorn Trophy	7	6404	12	91.02	11	155.06
Nov 8–10, 2024	(Czech Republic) 2024 Pavel Roman Memorial	2	69.54	2	104.24	2	173.78
Nov 12–17, 2024	(Estonia) 2024 CS Tallinn Trophy	8	66.67	6	103.83	6	170.50
Dec 12–15, 2024	(Spain) 2025 Spanish Championships	2	70.35	2	105.95	2	176.30
Jan 16–18, 2025	(Italy) 2025 Winter University Games	1	66.42	1	106.35	1	172.77

Results in the 2025–26 season
Date	Event	RD		FD		Total	
Date	Event	P	Score	P	Score	P	Score
Aug 16–17, 2025	(Netherlands) 2025 International ICE Dance Dordrecht	1	69.74	1	106.93	1	176.67
Sep 18–21, 2025	(China) 2025 ISU Skate to Milano	5	68.35	4	101.97	3	170.32
Oct 1–4, 2025	(Kazakhstan) 2025 CS Denis Ten Memorial Challenge	6	66.09	6	99.52	6	165.61
Nov 19–23, 2025	(Poland) 2025 CS Warsaw Cup	7	68.81	5	110.48	7	179.29
Nov 25–30, 2025	(Estonia) 2025 CS Tallinn Trophy	5	70.59	4	110.86	5	181.45
Dec 11–14, 2025	(Spain) 2026 Spanish Championships	2	72.12	2	118.05	2	190.17
Jan 6–11, 2026	(Bulgaria) 2026 Sofia Trophy	1	76.04	1	117.16	1	193.20
Jan 13–18, 2026	(United Kingdom) 2026 European Championships	15	67.11	14	106.62	14	173.73
Feb 9-11, 2026	(Italy) 2026 Winter Olympics	20	64.98	19	100.25	19	165.23

Results in the 2026–27 season
Date	Event	RD		FD		Total	
Date	Event	P	Score	P	Score	P	Score
Sep 24–27, 2026	(Slovakia) 2026 CS Nepela Memorial	9	69.87	11	98.61	11	168.48
Oct 23–25, 2026	2026 Grand Prix de France	5	64.78	4	101.21	4	165.99
Nov 13–15, 2026	(United States) 2026 Skate America	8	65.79	7	98.12	7	163.91
