= Tim Dieck =

German-Spanish ice dancer (born 1996)

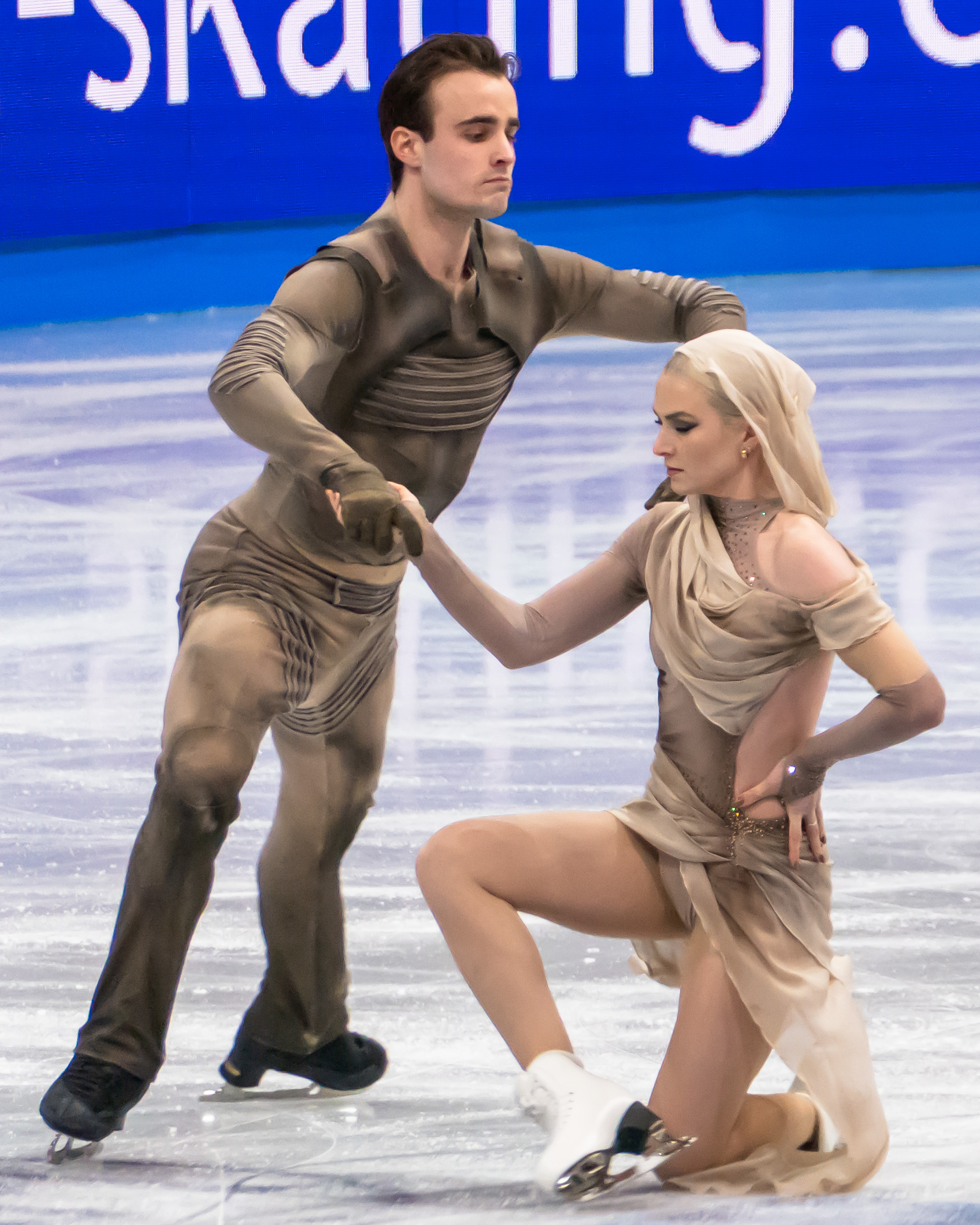
- Olivia Smart & Tim Dieck performing their "Dune" free dance at the 2025 World Championships

Personal information
- Born: 7 April 1996 (age 30) Dortmund, Germany
- Home town: Montreal, Quebec, Canada
- Height: 1.78 m (5 ft 10 in)

Figure skating career
- Country: Spain (since 2023); Germany (2011–22)
- Partner: Olivia Smart (since 2023); Katharina Müller (2014–22); Florence Clarke (2012–14); Dana Wehner (2011–12)
- Coach: Marie-France Dubreuil; Romain Haguenauer; Patrice Lauzon
- Skating club: F.C. Barcelona
- Began skating: 2001

Medal record
Representing Spain
Spanish Championships
Gold medal – first place	2024 Logroño	Ice dance
Gold medal – first place	2025 Logroño	Ice dance
Gold medal – first place	2026 Jaca	Ice dance
Representing Germany
German Championships
Gold medal – first place	2020 Oberstdorf	Ice dance
Gold medal – first place	2021 Dortmund	Ice dance
Silver medal – second place	2016 Essen	Ice dance
Silver medal – second place	2017 Berlin	Ice dance
Silver medal – second place	2018 Frankfurt	Ice dance
Silver medal – second place	2019 Stuttgart	Ice dance
Silver medal – second place	2022 Neuss	Ice dance

Tim Dieck (born 7 April 1996) is a German-Spanish competitive ice dancer who currently competes for Spain with Olivia Smart. Together, they are three-time Spanish national champions (2024–26), two-time Grand Prix medalists, and a five-time Challenger Series medalists (including three gold). They won a small bronze medal for their free dance at the 2025 World Championships. They represented Spain at the 2026 Winter Olympics.

With his former skating partner Katharina Müller, he is a two-time German national champion (2020-21), two-time Challenger Series silver medalist, and competed at the European and World championships. They represented Germany at the 2022 Winter Olympics.

== Personal life ==
Tim Dieck was born on 7 April 1996 in Dortmund, Germany. His parents, Martina and Frieder, are involved in figure skating as a coach and judge, respectively, and his sister, Dominique, formerly competed in ice dancing. As of 2017, he was studying sports science at Ruhr University Bochum. He was a soldier-athlete in the Bundeswehr. Additionally, he has been in a relationship with Italian pair skater, Sara Conti, since 2025.

In September 2025, he was granted Spanish citizenship.

== Career ==
=== Early career ===
Dieck started skating in 2000 and took up ice dancing in 2011. He skated with Dana Wehner in the 2011–12 season. They placed ninth at the 2012 German Junior Championships.

In 2012–13, Dieck began competing with Florence Clarke. They were fifth at the 2013 German Junior Championships. The following season, they debuted on the ISU Junior Grand Prix series, finishing ninth in Riga, Latvia and fifteenth in Gdańsk, Poland. They were also assigned to the 2014 World Junior Championships in Sofia, Bulgaria, but were eliminated after placing twenty-seventh in the short dance. Clarke decided to retire at the end of the season.

=== 2014–15 season: Debut of Müller/Dieck ===
Vitali Schulz arranged a tryout between Dieck and Katharina Müller. They teamed up in April 2014, coached by Schulz und James Young in Dortmund. Assigned to two Junior Grand Prix events, they placed eighth in Ljubljana, Slovenia, and seventh in Aichi, Japan. After winning the 2015 German junior national title, they were sent to the 2015 World Junior Championships in Tallinn, Estonia; ranked thirteenth in the short dance, they qualified for the final segment and finished twelfth overall.

=== 2015–16 season: Senior international debut ===
Competing in the Challenger Series (CS), Müller/Dieck finished tenth in September at the 2015 Nebelhorn Trophy – their first senior international – and eighth the following month at the 2015 Mordovian Ornament. In November, they won bronze at the 2015 NRW Trophy before appearing at their third CS event, the 2015 Tallinn Trophy, where they placed fifth. They were awarded the silver medal at the German Championships in December, having finished second to Lorenz/Polizoakis, and took bronze at the Toruń Cup. Müller/Dieck were included in Germany's team to the 2016 European Championships in Bratislava, Slovakia, but were eliminated after placing twenty-third in the short dance.

In spring 2016, Müller/Dieck began training under Marina Zueva in Canton, Michigan, in addition to Schulz and Young in Dortmund.

=== 2016–17 season ===
Müller/Dieck competed at two Challenger events, placing twelfth at the 2016 CS U.S. Classic and ninth at the 2016 CS Nebelhorn Trophy. They won gold at the NRW Trophy for the first time, and were the German national silver medalists for the second consecutive year.

=== 2017–18 season ===
Competing three times on the Challenger series, Müller/Dieck were fifth at the 2017 CS Warsaw Cup, sixth at the 2017 CS Ice Star, and eleventh at the 2017 CS Golden Spin of Zagreb. They won the silver medal at the German championships for the third consecutive year.

=== 2018–19 season ===
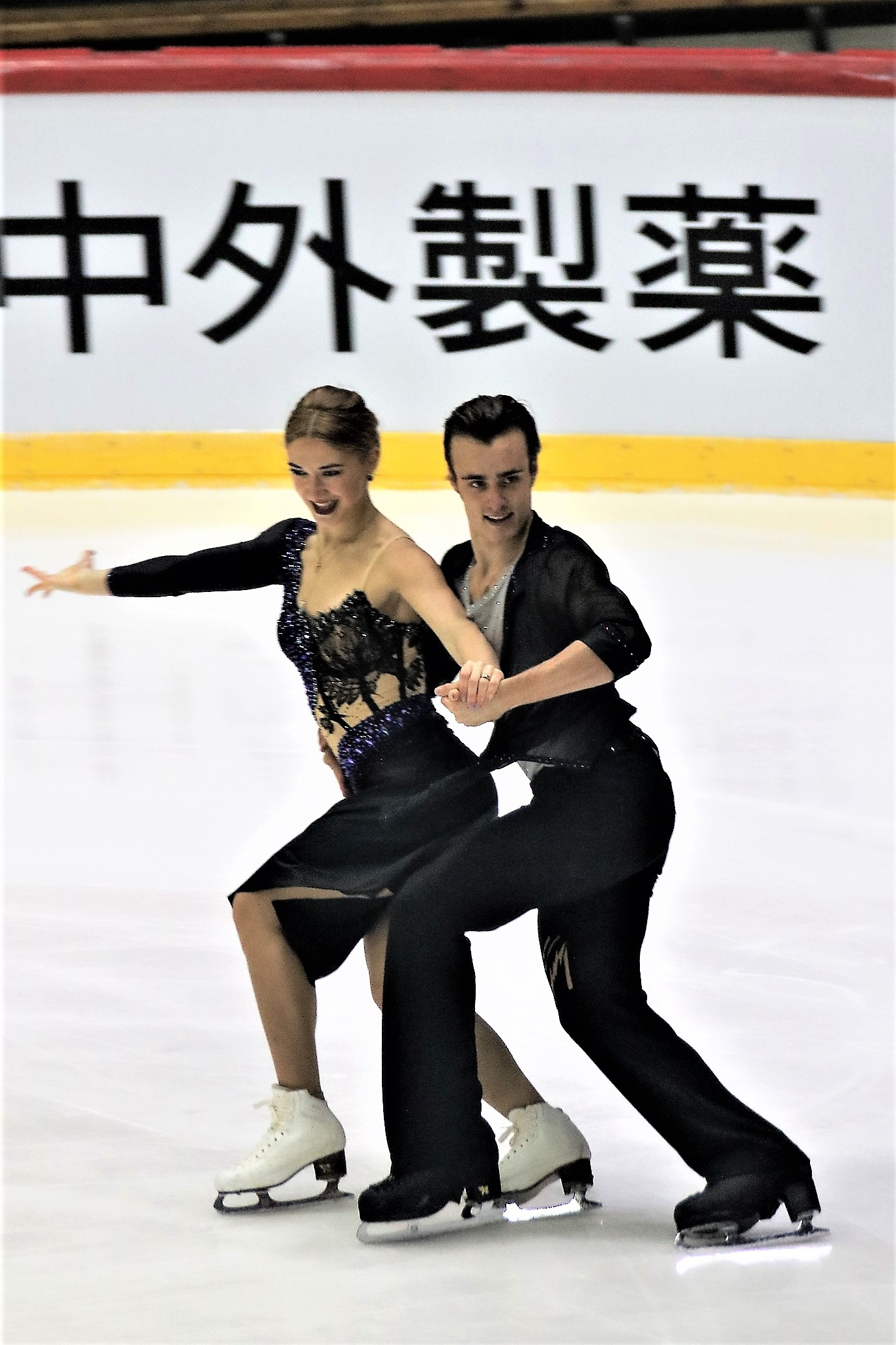
Müller/Dieck at the 2018 Grand Prix of Helsinki

Again competing on the Challenger series three times, Müller/Dieck were seventh at both the 2018 CS Nebelhorn Trophy and the 2018 CS Golden Spin of Zagreb and ninth at the 2018 CS Ondrej Nepela Trophy. They were invited to make their Grand Prix debut, placing seventh at the 2018 Skate America and tenth at the 2018 Grand Prix of Helsinki. NRW Trophy champions for the second time, they then won their fourth consecutive silver medal at the German championships.

=== 2019–20 season: First German national title ===
Müller/Dieck's three Challenger competitions for the year were the 2019 CS Ondrej Nepela Memorial, the 2019 CS Ice Star and the 2019 CS Golden Spin of Zagreb, where they placed eighth, sixth and sixth, respectively. They did not return to the Grand Prix, but won the inaugural Denis Ten Memorial Challenge and the Open d'Andorra, followed by becoming German national champions for the first time.

Müller/Dieck attended the European Championships for the first time in four seasons, placing thirteenth. They were supposed to make their World Championship debut at the 2020 edition in Montreal, but these were cancelled as a result of the COVID-19 pandemic.

=== 2020–21 season ===
Despite the continued limitations of the pandemic on international competition, Müller/Dieck won their first Challenger medal, a silver at the 2020 CS Budapest Trophy, as well as their third gold medal at the NRW Trophy. Repeating as German national champions, they went on to make their World Championship debut at the 2021 World Championships in Stockholm, where they came in eighteenth. This result qualified a berth for a German ice dance team at the 2022 Winter Olympics in Beijing.

=== 2021–22 season: Beijing Olympics and End of Müller/Dieck ===
Müller/Dieck began the season at the 2021 CS Nebelhorn Trophy, winning the silver medal. Dieck noted that it was "always special to win a medal in Germany," while Müller said, "we were not competing for an Olympic spot here, but it was important to us for our national qualification and to prove that we are ready and want to go to the Olympic Games." They came ninth at the 2021 CS Finlandia Trophy.

Initially assigned to the 2021 Cup of China on the Grand Prix, upon its cancellation Müller/Dieck were reassigned to the 2021 Gran Premio d'Italia. They finished in eighth place. They were sixth at the 2021 CS Cup of Austria and second at the Open d'Andorra.

Despite losing the German national title to rivals Janse van Rensburg/Steffan, Müller/Dieck were named to the German Olympic team. They first competed at the 2022 European Championships, finishing in twelfth place.

Müller/Dieck began the 2022 Winter Olympics as the German entries in the rhythm dance segment of the Olympic team event, where they finished tenth among ten. In the dance event, they were twenty-first in the rhythm dance, missing the cut for the free dance.

The team encountered new difficulties following the Olympics, as Vladimir Putin's invasion of Ukraine and resultant tensions between Russia and Germany resulted in their being unable to return to their Moscow training location. Dieck and Müller separated after the season ended.

=== 2023–24 season: Debut of Smart/Dieck ===
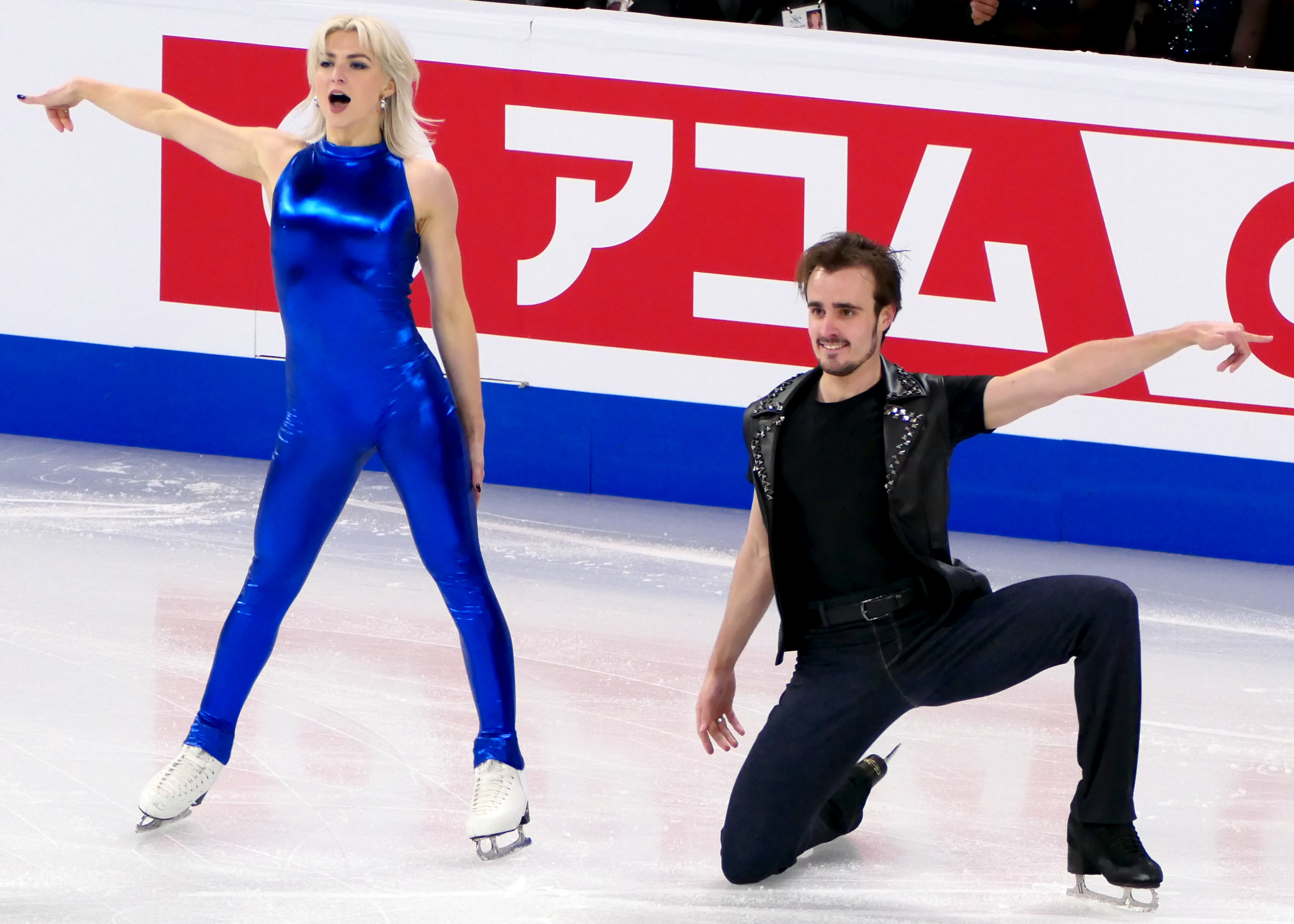
Smart and Dieck during their rhythm dance at the 2024 World Championships

Following the end of his partnership with Müller, Dieck connected with Anglo-Spanish ice dancer Olivia Smart. The two explored representing either Germany or Spain, but the Spanish Ice Sports Federation offered superior financial support and they requested Dieck be released by the German Ice Skating Union. The release was granted in December 2022, and it was announced that they would begin training in April 2023 in Montreal under Smart's longtime coaches Marie-France Dubreuil, Patrice Lauzon and Romain Haguenauer.

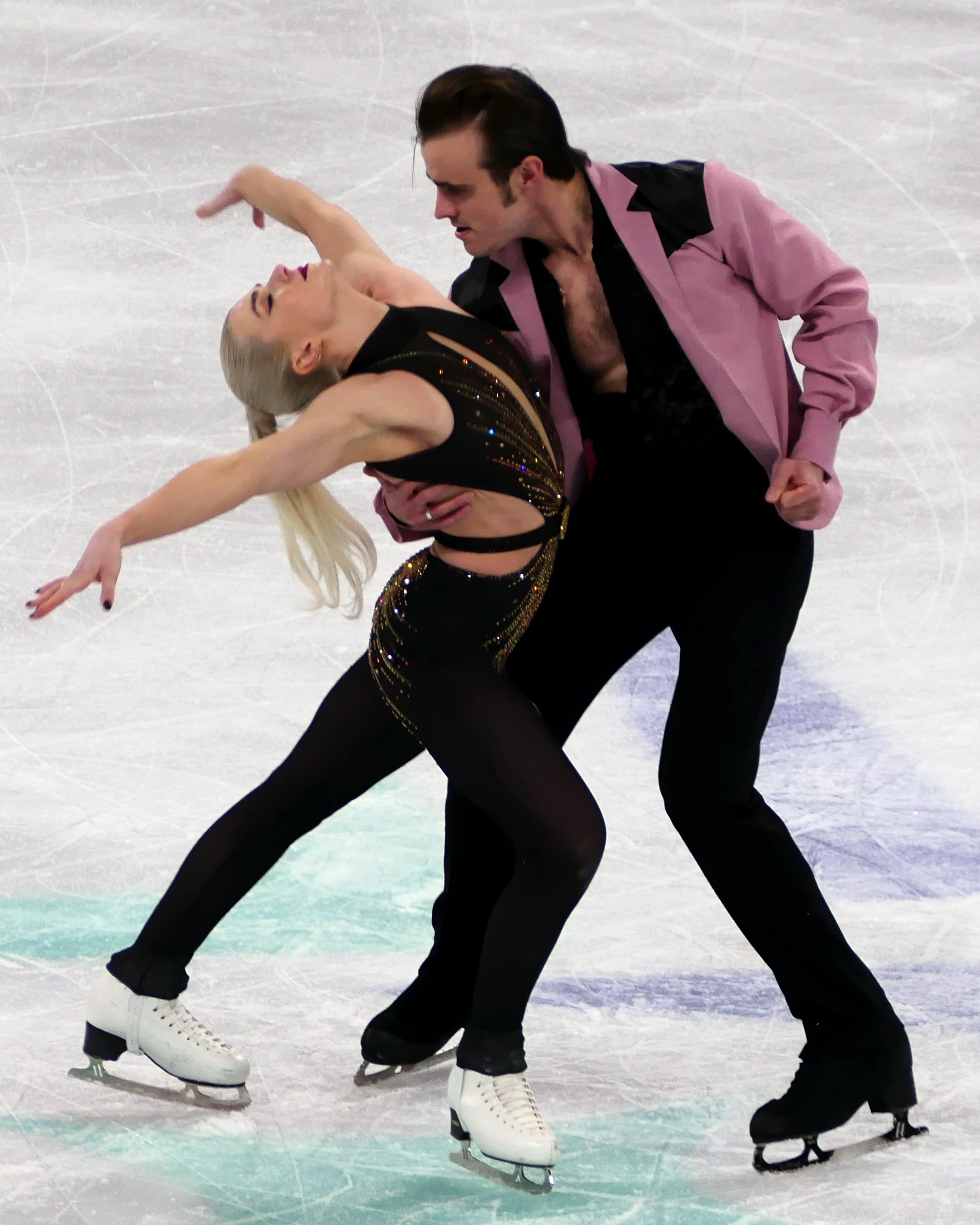
Smart and Dieck during their free dance at the 2024 World Championships

Smart/Dieck made their international competitive debut at the 2023 CS Autumn Classic International, coming fourth. They went on to finish fourth as well at the 2023 CS Finlandia Trophy. Making their Grand Prix debut as a team at the 2023 Skate America, Smart/Dieck placed sixth. They were then eighth at the 2023 Grand Prix de France.

Competing at their first Spanish Championships in December, Smart/Dieck won the gold medal over rivals Val/Kazimov. Despite this, it was initially announced by the Spanish federation that Val/Kazimov would represent the country at the 2024 European and World Championships. Following controversy around the criteria used to arrive at this result, on December 27 the Spanish federation announced that Smart/Dieck would instead be given the country's lone World Championship berth.

Smart/Dieck won the silver medal at the International Challenge Cup in February. At the World Championships, held in Montreal, Quebec, Canada, the home of the team's training base, Smart/Dieck were fifteenth in the rhythm dance and qualified to the free dance. An error on their dance spin saw them finish twentieth among twenty teams in the free dance, dropping to nineteenth overall. Smart remarked that the mistake "fits within this season full of ups and downs, which we accept as a lesson we have to learn"

=== 2024–25 season: Dune and Grand Prix bronze ===
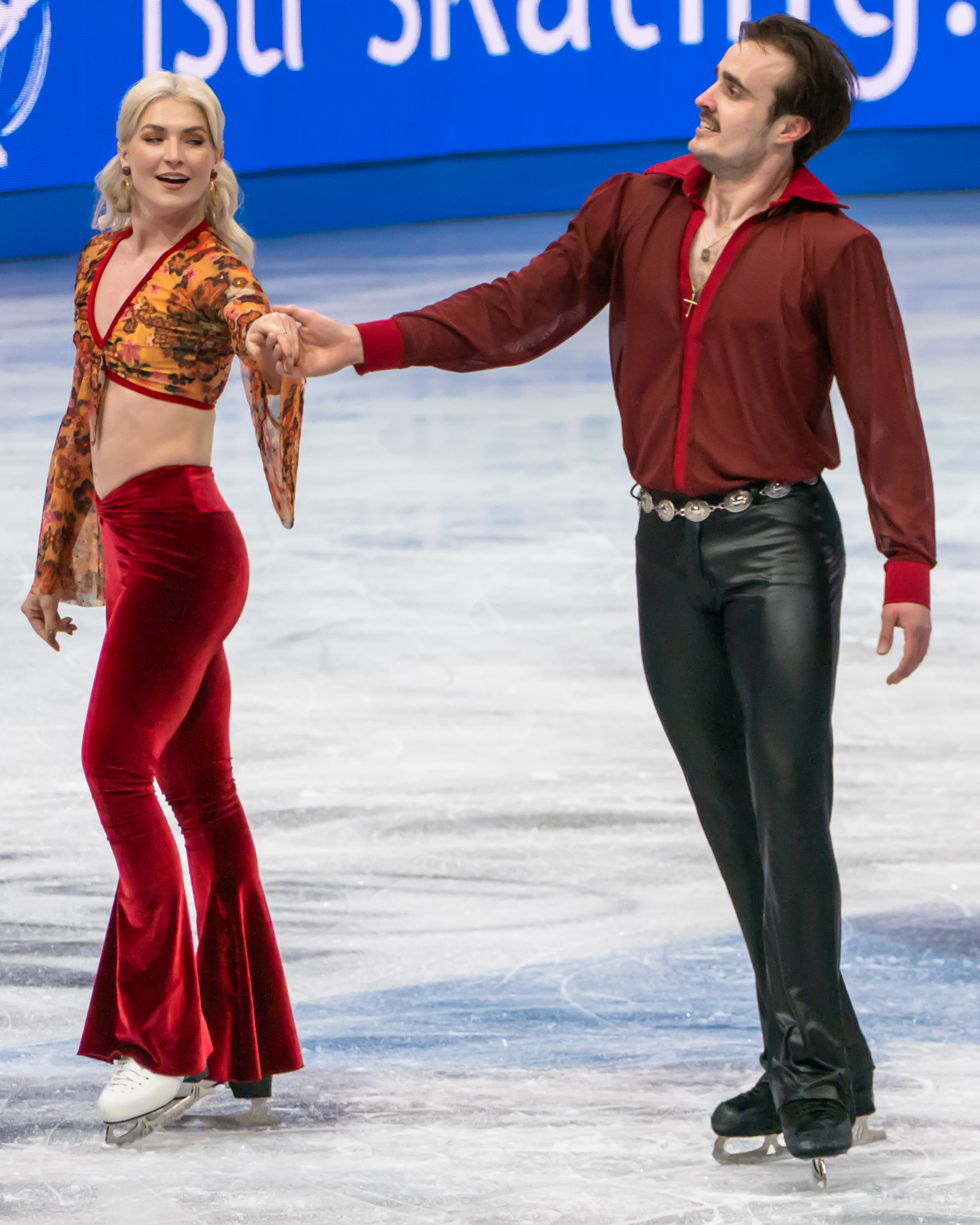
Smart and Dieck following their rhythm dance at the 2025 World Championships

When preparing their programs for the new season, Smart suggested for their free program Hans Zimmer's Dune soundtrack, explaining later that "it gave me a feeling I wanted to feel... I wanted something that gave me goosebumps, something that made me feel that type of way." They were the only ice dance team to use that music during the season.

Smart and Dieck began the season on the Challenger circuit with a sixth-place finish at the 2024 Nebelhorn Trophy. On the 2024–25 Grand Prix series, their first assignment was the 2024 Skate America, they finished fifth in the short program, having lost a twizzle level and receiving only a level one on their pattern steps. However, they came third in the free dance with a new personal best (118.45), and rose to third overall to claim the bronze medal. Smart said that the free dance score made her feel that "finally all our hard work had paid off. Of course there were plenty of doubts." Smart also debuted a new Dune-themed free dance costume at Skate America that had been designed by friend and training partner Madison Chock, saying later "I should have gone to her in the first place." Both the costuming and the program would garner acclaim at the event. One week later, Smart/Dieck won a bronze medal at the 2024 CS Nepela Memorial, their second Challenger appearance. Going on to compete at the 2024 Cup of China, Smart and Dieck were fifth in the rhythm dance and third in the free dance, as at Skate America, but this time finishing fourth overall.

In December, Smart/Dieck won their second consecutive national title at the 2025 Spanish Championships. The following month they made their European Championship debut at the 2025 edition in Tallinn, Estonia. During a practice session, the team had a collision with Israeli dancers Elizabeth Tkachenko and Alexei Kiliakov; while Dieck hit his head on the ice, Kiliakov was cut on the leg and as a result the Israelis withdrew from the event. Smart/Dieck came seventh in the rhythm dance, fifth in the free dance, and finished fifth overall. The Dune program again received a strong reception, Dieck observing that "the audience was incredible. Like, they were so into it. At the quiet parts of the music, you could have heard a pin drop."

At the 2025 World Championships in Boston, Massachusetts, United States, Smart/Dieck placed eighth in the rhythm dance (77.21), setting a new personal best. In the free dance they set another best score of 123.71, which placed third in the segment, elevating them to sixth place overall. They received a bronze small medal for the free dance, a first for a Spanish dance team. Smart said afterward that while they were considering another idea for an Olympic season free dance, it was also possible that they would retain the Dune program for the next season, remarking "we need to weigh our options carefully." They also talked about the evolution of their partnership, the deep trust they’ve built, their connection, and insight into their training process. They subsequently received the award for Best Costume at the 2025 ISU Skating Awards.

=== 2025–26 season: Milano Cortina Olympics ===
Smart/Dieck performing their free dance at the 2026 European Championships

For the upcoming season, Smart/Dieck announced that they planned to continue performing to the music of Dune for their free dance

and that they would "revamp" the program by skating to different tracks from the movies. "We elevated our elements from last season; the transitions are much harder, so we need to build the stamina to skate it cleanly," explained Dieck.

They began the season in late September by winning gold at the 2025 CS Nepela Memorial. The following month, they started competing on the 2025–26 Grand Prix series, finishing fourth at the 2025 Cup of China. "It wasn't our best skate, but it was decent," said Dieck of the Free Dance. "We felt a few little wobbles, maybe not even visible, but the goal was to come as close as possible to how we train, and it was almost there."

The following month, Smart and Dieck placed fourth at 2025 Finlandia Trophy. "Today felt good," said Smart after the Free Dance. "We went out there and did what we could today where we are in this part of the season. They were tough on technique here this week from the Rhythm Dance and the Free Dance. We knew we could be up there in the top three on the podium."

In January, Smart and Dieck competed at the 2026 European Championships where they found themselves in tenth place after the rhythm dance. “This score wasn’t what we hoped for,” said Smart. “We definitely want to push more towards the 80s and compete with the top teams." They went on to place fifth in the free dance with a new season's best, and moved up to seventh place overall. "We don’t want to be known as a free dance team," said Smart after the Free Dance. "We want to be up there in the rhythm dance and up there in the free. And yesterday that could have been possible. We could have been closer to the 80s."

The following month, Smart and Dieck competed at the 2026 Winter Olympics. They placed tenth in the rhythm dance and sixth in the free dance to finish in ninth place overall. "We just finished on an absolute high at our first Olympics together," said Dieck following their free dance. "Worlds are next, and then we’ll see what next season holds. But we’ve definitely said we want to continue. We’re taking it season by season."

In March, Smart and Dieck finished fifth at the 2026 World Championships in Prague, Czech Republic after placing sixth in the rhythm dance and second in the free dance. In the process, the team earned personal best scores in all segments of the competition. "We are overjoyed," said Dieck after their free dance performance. "We had no expectations coming in here other than to do exactly what we did on the ice. To create a moment, skate the best we ever skated this ‘Dune: Part Two.’ And we did that here today on the ice in Prague. The outcome is a small silver medal, something we believed we could achieve and something that we wanted. But we never speak too far into existence because we don’t want to have too many expectations."

=== 2026–27 season ===
Smart/Dieck opened their season in September at 2026 Nepela Memorial where they won gold. In October, they followed up with a silver medal at 2026 Budapest Trophy.

In November, Smart/Dieck competed at 2026 Cup of China, placing third after a mistake in the rhythm dance. “We’re not very happy,” said Smart after the free dance. “We were both nervous going into the free dance, and after a day like yesterday, it makes sense. We felt like we did our job today, but we have a lot more training to do on this program.”

== Programs ==
=== Ice dance with Olivia Smart (for Spain) ===
Season	Short dance	Free dance	Exhibition
2026–2027	Ramalama (Bang Bang) by Róisín Murphy	Sadeness (Part I); Gravity of Love by Enigma	
2025–2026	Freedom; Let Me Entertain You by Robbie Williams choreo. by Samuel Chouinard	Beginnings Are Such Delicate Times; Resurrection; Dune Part Two (Trailer Mix) (from Dune: Part Two) by Hans Zimmer; Dune Part Two - Trailer 3 Music (epic version) by Mathias Fritsche; Navras (from The Matrix Revolutions) by Don Davis & Juno Reactor all arranged by Karl Hugo choreo. by Romain Haguenauer	Tubthumping by Chumbawamba; Beautiful Day by U2; Freed from Desire by Gala
2024–2025	Move Over by Janis Joplin; Piece of My Heart by Jerry Ragovoy & Bert Berns performed by Big Brother and the Holding Company & Janis Joplin; Black Betty by Ram Jam choreo. by Marie-France Dubreuil	Resurrection; Seduction (from Dune: Part Two); House Atreides (from Dune); A Time of Quiet Between the Storms; Trailer 3 Music Dune Part Two (from Dune: Part Two) by Hans Zimmer; The Feeling Begins (from The Last Temptation of Christ) by Peter Gabriel choreo. by Romain Haguenauer, Samuel Chouinard	Also sprach Zarathustra/An American Trilogy by Richard Strauss performed by Elvis Presley; Craw-Fever by Elvis Presley; Suspicious Minds performed by Paravi; Trouble (from Elvis) performed by Austin Butler Marie-France Dubreuil, Romain Haguenauer choreo. by Marie-France Dubreuil, Romain Haguenauer
2024–2025	Move Over by Janis Joplin; Piece of My Heart by Jerry Ragovoy & Bert Berns performed by Big Brother and the Holding Company & Janis Joplin; Touch Me by The Doors choreo. by Marie-France Dubreuil	Resurrection; Seduction (from Dune: Part Two); House Atreides (from Dune); A Time of Quiet Between the Storms; Trailer 3 Music Dune Part Two (from Dune: Part Two) by Hans Zimmer; The Feeling Begins (from The Last Temptation of Christ) by Peter Gabriel choreo. by Romain Haguenauer, Samuel Chouinard	Also sprach Zarathustra/An American Trilogy by Richard Strauss performed by Elvis Presley; Craw-Fever by Elvis Presley; Suspicious Minds performed by Paravi; Trouble (from Elvis) performed by Austin Butler Marie-France Dubreuil, Romain Haguenauer choreo. by Marie-France Dubreuil, Romain Haguenauer
2023–2024	Call Me; Rapture by Blondie choreo. by Marie-France Dubreuil, Romain Haguenauer	Also sprach Zarathustra/An American Trilogy by Richard Strauss performed by Elvis Presley; Craw-Fever by Elvis Presley; Suspicious Minds performed by Paravi; Trouble (from Elvis) performed by Austin Butler choreo. by Marie-France Dubreuil, Romain Haguenauer	The Race by Yello

=== With Müller ===
Season	Short dance	Free dance
2021–2022	Spirit in the Sky by Norman Greenbaum; Toxic by Britney Spears; Seven Nation Army by The White Stripes	Run to You by Whitney Houston; Queen of the Night performed by Alexandra Burke; I Will Always Love You by Whitney Houston
2020–2021	Quickstep: Steppin' Out with My Baby (from Easter Parade) by Irving Berlin; Foxtrot: The Way You Look Tonight (from Swing Time) by Jerome Kern & Dorothy Fields; Quickstep: Puttin' On the Ritz by Irving Berlin	Coco Chanel by Andrea Guerra; Man's World
2019–2020	Quickstep: Express; Foxtrot: Show Me How You Burlesque; Quickstep: Tough Lover (from Burlesque) by Christina Aguilera	Coco Chanel by Andrea Guerra; Man's World
2018–2019	Tango	The Way Through Cancer; Blood and Guts; Steppe by René Aubry; Where is my Mind by Maxence Cyrin
2017–2018	Dibby Dibby Sound by Avera; I'm Not the Only One by Sam Smith	The Bodyguard by Whitney Houston
2016–2017	Blues: New Year's Blues; Swing: Jolie Coquine	Megecina; Tabakiera; Mahalageasca (Bucovina Dub)
2015–2016	March: MicMacs à tire-larigot; Waltz: MicMacs à tire-larigot	Ave Maria by Thomas Spencer-Wortley
2014–2015	Samba: Chinqui Chinqui Boom; Rhumba: You're My Everything; Samba: Jump in the Line (Shake, Senora)	Burlesque: Express by Christina Aguilera; Welcome to Burlesque by Cher; Show Me How You Burlesque by Christina Aguilera

=== With Clarke ===
Season	Short dance	Free dance
2013–2014	Slow Fox: I Will Wait For You; Quickstep: Puttin' on the Ritz by Irving Berlin	Moonlight Sonata; Still

== Competitive highlights ==
- GP – Event of the ISU Grand Prix Series
- JGP – Event of the ISU Junior Grand Prix Series
- CS – Event of the ISU Challenger Series
- TBD – Assigned
- WD – Withdrew from competition
- C – Event was cancelled

=== Ice dance with Olivia Smart (for Spain) ===
Competition placements at senior level
Season	2023–24	2024–25	2025–26	2026–27
Winter Olympics			9th	
World Championships	19th	6th	5th	
European Championships		5th	7th	
Spanish Championships	1st	1st	1st	
GP Cup of China		4th	4th	3rd
GP Finland			4th	
GP France	8th			
GP NHK Trophy				2nd
GP Skate America	6th	3rd		
CS Autumn Classic	4th			
CS Budapest Trophy				2nd
CS Finlandia Trophy	4th			
CS Nebelhorn Trophy		6th		
CS Nepela Memorial		3rd	1st	1st
CS Tallinn Trophy			1st	
Challenge Cup	2nd			

=== With Müller for Germany ===
International
Event	14–15	15–16	16–17	17–18	18–19	19–20	20–21	21–22
Olympics								21st
Worlds						C	18th	
Europeans		23rd				13th		12th
GP Cup of China								C
GP Finland					10th			
GP France							C	
GP Italy								8th
GP Skate America					7th			
CS Budapest Trophy							2nd	
CS Cup of Austria								6th
CS Finlandia Trophy								9th
CS Golden Spin				11th	7th	6th		
CS Ice Star				6th		6th		
CS Mordovian		8th						
CS Nebelhorn Trophy		10th	9th		7th			2nd
CS Ondrej Nepela					9th	8th		
CS Tallinn Trophy		5th						
CS U.S. Classic			12th					
CS Warsaw Cup				5th			C	
Bavarian Open		5th						
Cup of Nice			2nd	9th				
Denis Ten Memorial						1st		
Egna Trophy						4th	WD	
Mezzaluna Cup						5th		
NRW Trophy		3rd	1st		1st		1st	
Open d'Andorra			2nd			1st		2nd
Universiade			4th		7th			
Toruń Cup		3rd						
Volvo Open				1st	2nd			
International: Junior
Junior Worlds	12th							
JGP Japan	7th							
JGP Slovenia	8th							
Bavarian Open	3rd							
Ice Star	4th							
NRW Trophy	1st							
Santa Claus Cup	3rd							
National
German Champ.	1st J	2nd	2nd	2nd	2nd	1st	1st	2nd
National
Olympics								9th T

=== With Clarke for Germany ===
International: Junior
Event	2012–13	2013–14
World Junior Champ.		27th
JGP Latvia		9th
JGP Poland		15th
Bavarian Open	13th	5th
Ice Star		6th
NRW Trophy	14th	4th
Volvo Open Cup		4th
National
German Champ.	5th J	

=== With Wehner for Germany ===
International: Junior
Event	2011–12
NRW Trophy	17th
Santa Claus Cup	14th
National
German Championships	9th J

== Detailed results ==
ISU personal best scores in the +5/-5 GOE System
Segment	Type	Score	Event
Total	TSS	206.37	2026 World Championships
Short program	TSS	81.06	2026 World Championships
Short program	TES	46.11	2026 World Championships
Short program	PCS	34.95	2026 World Championships
Free skating	TSS	125.31	2026 World Championships
Free skating	TES	70.99	2025 World Championships
Free skating	PCS	54.64	2026 World Championships

=== Ice dance with Olivia Smart (for Spain) ===
Results in the 2023–24 season
Date	Event	RD		FD		Total	
Date	Event	P	Score	P	Score	P	Score
Sep 14–17, 2023	(Canada) 2023 CS Autumn Classic International	3	72.27	5	96.81	4	169.11
Oct 4–8, 2023	(Finland) 2023 CS Finlandia Trophy	3	72.56	6	105.91	4	178.47
Oct 20–22, 2023	(United States) 2023 Skate America	6	71.96	6	108.71	6	180.67
Nov 3–5, 2023	2023 Grand Prix de France	6	69.91	9	96.67	8	166.58
Dec 15–17, 2023	(Spain) 2024 Spanish Championships	1	73.04	1	111.94	1	184.98
Feb 22–25, 2024	(Netherlands) 2024 Challenge Cup	2	72.44	2	108.20	2	180.64
Mar 18–24, 2024	(Canada) 2024 World Championships	15	71.81	20	101.72	19	173.53

Results in the 2024–25 season
Date	Event	RD		FD		Total	
Date	Event	P	Score	P	Score	P	Score
Sep 19–21, 2024	(Germany) 2024 CS Nebelhorn Trophy	5	72.43	9	97.62	6	170.05
Oct 18–20, 2024	(United States) 2024 Skate America	5	70.99	3	118.45	3	189.44
Oct 24–26, 2024	(Slovakia) 2024 CS Nepela Memorial	3	74.77	3	116.69	3	191.46
Nov 22–24, 2024	2024 Cup of China	5	75.96	3	120.56	4	196.52
Dec 12–15, 2024	(Spain) 2025 Spanish Championships	1	79.75	1	125.77	1	205.52
Jan 28 – Feb 2, 2025	(Estonia) 2025 European Championships	7	76.13	5	122.85	5	198.98
Mar 26–30, 2025	(United States) 2025 World Championships	8	77.21	3	123.71	6	200.92

Results in the 2025–26 season
Date	Event	RD		FD		Total	
Date	Event	P	Score	P	Score	P	Score
Sep 25–27, 2025	(Slovakia) 2025 CS Nepela Memorial	2	74.44	1	118.23	1	192.67
Oct 24–26, 2025	2025 Cup of China	6	67.37	3	120.14	4	187.51
Nov 21–23, 2025	(Finland) 2025 Finlandia Trophy	4	76.07	4	115.99	4	192.06
Nov 25–30, 2025	(Estonia) 2025 CS Tallinn Trophy	4	73.03	1	119.64	1	192.67
Dec 11–14, 2025	(Spain) 2026 Spanish Championships	1	79.18	1	128.71	1	207.89
Jan 13–18, 2026	(United Kingdom) 2026 European Championships	10	75.17	5	121.27	7	196.44
Feb 9-11, 2026	(Italy) 2026 Winter Olympics	10	78.53	6	122.96	9	201.49
Mar 24–29, 2026	(Czech Republic) 2026 World Championships	6	81.06	2	125.31	5	206.37

Results in the 2026–27 season
Date	Event	RD		FD		Total	
Date	Event	P	Score	P	Score	P	Score
Sep 24–27, 2026	(Slovakia) 2026 CS Nepela Memorial	1	79.17	1	118.05	1	197.22
Oct 15–18, 2026	(Hungary) 2026 CS Budapest Trophy	1	79.42	4	105.67	2	185.09
Nov 6–8, 2026	2026 Cup of China	5	70.98	3	107.32	3	178.30
