= Skate to Milano =

International figure skating competition

- Date: 18 – 21 September 2025
- Season: 2025–26
- Location: Beijing, China
- Host: Chinese Figure Skating Association
- Venue: National Indoor Stadium

Champions
- Men's singles: (Individual Neutral Athletes) Petr Gumennik
- Women's singles: (Individual Neutral Athletes) Adeliia Petrosian
- Pairs: (China) Zhang Jiaxuan and Huang Yihang
- Ice dance: (Lithuania) Allison Reed and Saulius Ambrulevičius

The Skate to Milano was a figure skating competition sanctioned by the International Skating Union (ISU), organized and hosted by the Chinese Figure Skating Association. It was held at the National Indoor Stadium in Beijing, China, from 18 to 21 September 2025. This was the final figure skating qualification competition for the 2026 Winter Olympics in Milan. Seventeen quota spots for the Olympics that had not been awarded at the 2025 World Figure Skating Championships in Boston were assigned. Medals were also awarded in men's singles, women's singles, pair skating, and ice dance. Petr Gumennik and Adeliia Petrosian, both of Russia, won the men's and women's events, respectively. Zhang Jiaxuan and Huang Yihang of China won the pairs event, and Allison Reed and Saulius Ambrulevičius of Lithuania won the ice dance event.

== Background ==
The number of entries for the figure skating events at the Winter Olympics is determined by quotas set by the International Olympic Committee. A total of 142 quota spots were available to athletes to compete in the figure skating events at the 2026 Winter Olympics in Milan. There were 29 spots allotted each in men's and women's singles, 19 in pair skating, and 23 in ice dance. 83 spots had already been allocated based on the results of the 2025 World Figure Skating Championships: 24 entries each in men's and women's singles, 16 in pairs, and 19 in ice dance. The remainder of the spots – 5 in each singles events, 3 in pairs, and 4 in ice dance – were filled at the Skate to Milano. The competition was held at the National Indoor Stadium in Beijing, China, from 18 to 21 September 2025.

The Figure Skating Federation of Russia and the Skating Union of Belarus were each permitted to nominate one skater or team from each discipline to participate at this event as a means to qualify for the 2026 Winter Olympics as Individual Neutral Athletes (AINs). Each nominee was required to pass a special screening process to assess whether they had displayed any active support for the Russian invasion of Ukraine or any contractual links to the Russian or Belarusian military or other national security agencies. In May 2025, the International Skating Union (ISU) announced the Russian and Belarusian skaters who had been granted AIN status: Vladislav Dikidzhi and Petr Gumennik in men's singles, and Alina Gorbacheva and Adeliia Petrosian in women's singles from Russia; Vasil Barakhouski and Yauhenii Puzanau in men's singles, Viktoriia Safonova and Nastassia Sidarenka in women's singles, and Viktoriya Plaskonnaya and Uladzislau Sytsik in ice dance from Belarus.

== Changes to preliminary assignments ==
The ISU published the initial list of entrants on 20 August 2025.

Changes to preliminary entries
Discipline	Withdrew			Added			Ref.
Discipline	Date	Country	Skater(s)	Date	Country	Skater(s)	Ref.
Men	28 August	Bulgaria	Alexander Zlatkov	—N/a			
Women	28 August	Cyprus	Marilena Kitromilis	28 August	Cyprus	Stefania Yakovleva	
Ice dance	28 August	Individual Neutral Athletes	Viktoryia Plaskonnaya; Uladzislau Sytsik	—N/a			
Women	7 September	Estonia	Nataly Langerbaur	7 September	Estonia	Kristina Lisovskaja	
Pairs	7 September	Sweden	Greta Crafoord; John Crafoord	—N/a			
Ice dance	7 September	Italy	Victoria Manni; Carlo Röthlisberger	7 September	Italy	Giulia Isabella Paolino; Andrea Tuba	
Ice dance	14 September	Ukraine	Zoe Larson; Andrii Kapran	14 September	Ukraine	Mariia Pinchuk; Mykyta Pogorielov	
Women	14 September	Ukraine	Sofiia Hryhorenko	—N/a			
Women	15 September	India	Tara Prasad	—N/a			

== Required performance elements ==
=== Single skating ===
Men competing in single skating first performed their short program on 20 September, while women performed theirs on 19 September. Lasting 2 minutes 40 seconds (+/− 10 seconds), the short program had to include the following elements:

For men: one double or triple Axel; one triple or quadruple jump; one jump combination consisting of a double jump and a triple jump, two triple jumps, or a quadruple jump and a double jump or triple jump; one flying spin; one camel spin or sit spin with a change of foot; one spin combination with a change of foot; and a step sequence using the full ice surface.

For women: one double or triple Axel; one triple jump; one jump combination consisting of a double jump and a triple jump, or two triple jumps; one flying spin; one layback spin, sideways leaning spin, camel spin, or sit spin without a change of foot; one spin combination with a change of foot; and one step sequence using the full ice surface.

Women performed their free skates on 20 September, while men performed theirs on 21 September. Lasting 4 minutes (+/− 10 seconds), the free skate had to include the following: seven jump elements, of which one had to be an Axel-type jump; three spins, of which one had to be a spin combination, one a flying spin, and one a spin with only one position; a step sequence; and a choreographic sequence.

=== Pairs ===
Couples competing in pair skating first performed their short program on 19 September. Lasting 2 minutes 40 seconds (+/− 10 seconds), the short program had to include the following elements: one pair lift, one double or triple twist lift, one double or triple throw jump, one double or triple solo jump, one solo spin combination with a change of foot, one death spiral, and a step sequence using the full ice surface.

Couples performed their free skates on 20 September. Lasting 4 minutes (+/− 10 seconds), the free skate had to include the following: three pair lifts, of which one has to be a twist lift; two different throw jumps; one solo jump; one jump combination or sequence; one pair spin combination; one death spiral; and a choreographic sequence.

=== Ice dance ===
Couples competing in ice dance performed their rhythm dances on 19 September. Lasting 2 minutes 50 seconds (+/− 10 seconds), the theme of the rhythm dance this season was "music, dance styles, and feeling of the 1990s". Examples of applicable dance styles and music included pop, Latin, house, techno, hip-hop, and grunge. The rhythm dance had to include the following elements: one pattern dance step sequence, one choreographic rhythm sequence, one dance lift, one set of sequential twizzles, and one step sequence.

Couples then performed their free dances on 21 September. Lasting 4 minutes (+/− 10 seconds), the free dance had to include the following: three dance lifts, one dance spin, one set of synchronized twizzles, one step sequence in hold, one step sequence while on one skate and not in hold, and three choreographic elements.

== Judging ==
Skaters were judged according to the required technical elements of their program (such as jumps and spins), as well as the overall presentation of their program, based on three program components (skating skills, presentation, and composition). Each technical element in a figure skating performance was assigned a predetermined base point value and scored by a panel of nine judges on a scale from −5 to +5 based on the quality of its execution. Each Grade of Execution (GOE) from –5 to +5 was assigned a value as indicated on the Scale of Values. For example, a triple Axel was worth a base value of 8.00 points, and a GOE of +3 was worth 2.40 points, so a triple Axel with a GOE of +3 earned 10.40 points. The judging panel's GOE for each element was determined by calculating the trimmed mean (the average after discarding the highest and lowest scores). The panel's scores for all elements were added together to generate a Total Elements Score. At the same time, the judges evaluated each performance based on the five aforementioned program components and assigned each a score from 0.25 to 10 in 0.25-point increments. The judging panel's final score for each program component was also determined by calculating the trimmed mean. Those scores were then multiplied by the factor shown on the chart below; the results were added together to generate a total Program Component Score.

Program component factoring
Discipline	Short program or rhythm dance	Free skate or free dance
Men	1.67	3.33
Women	1.33	2.67
Pairs	1.33	2.67
Ice dance	1.33	2.00

Deductions were applied for certain violations, such as time infractions or falls. The Total Elements Score and Program Component Score were then added together, minus any deductions, to generate a final performance score for each skater or team.

== Medal summary ==
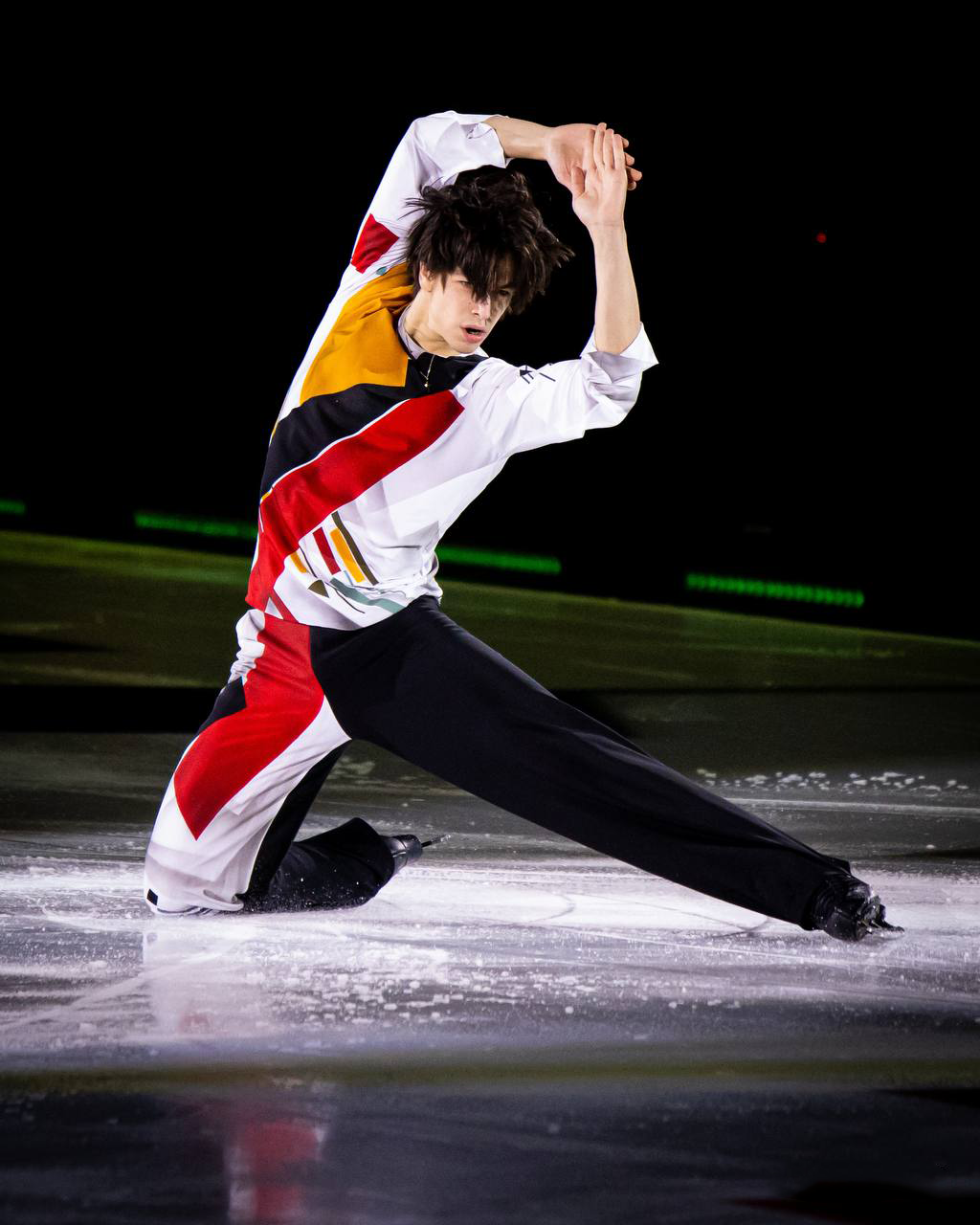
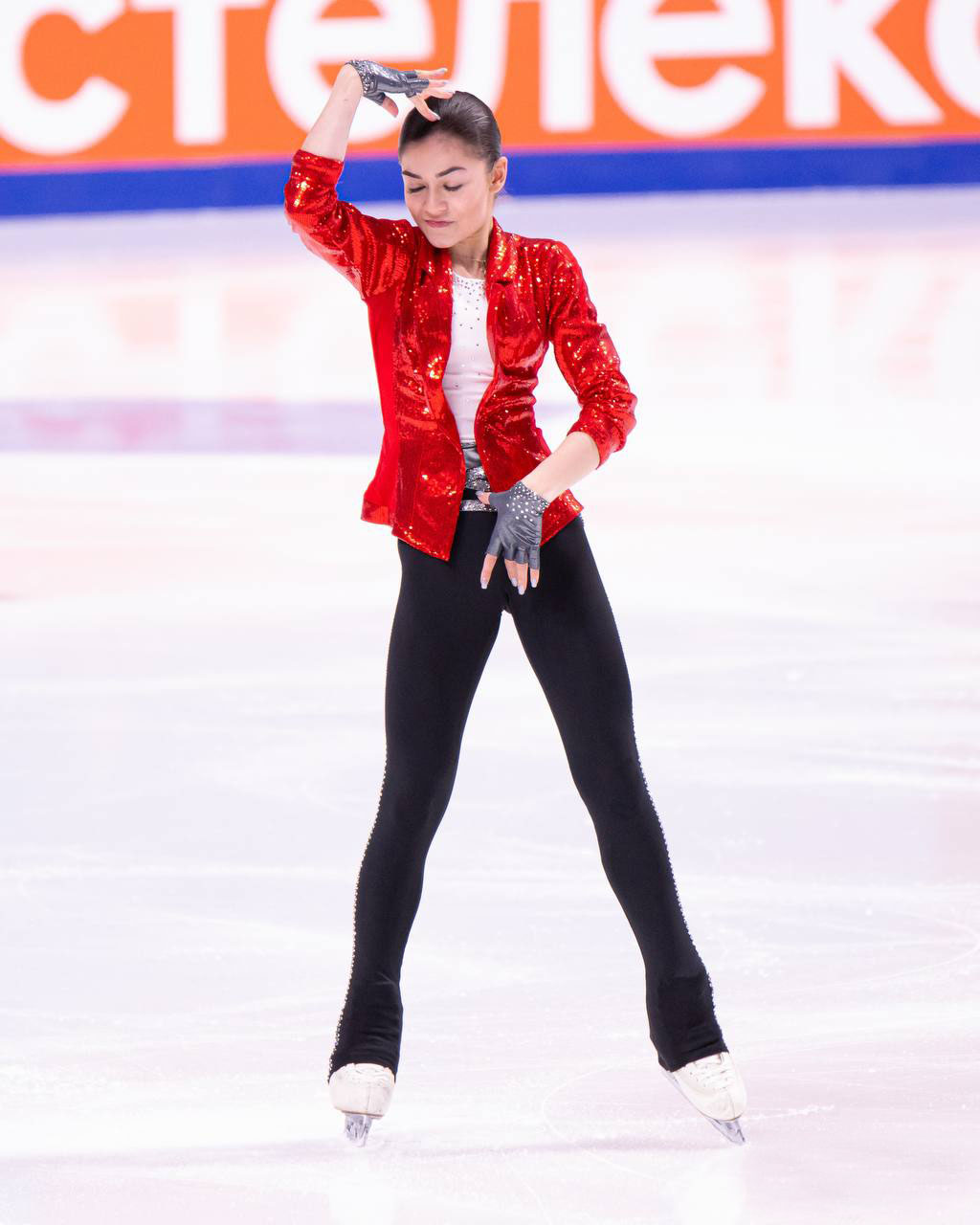
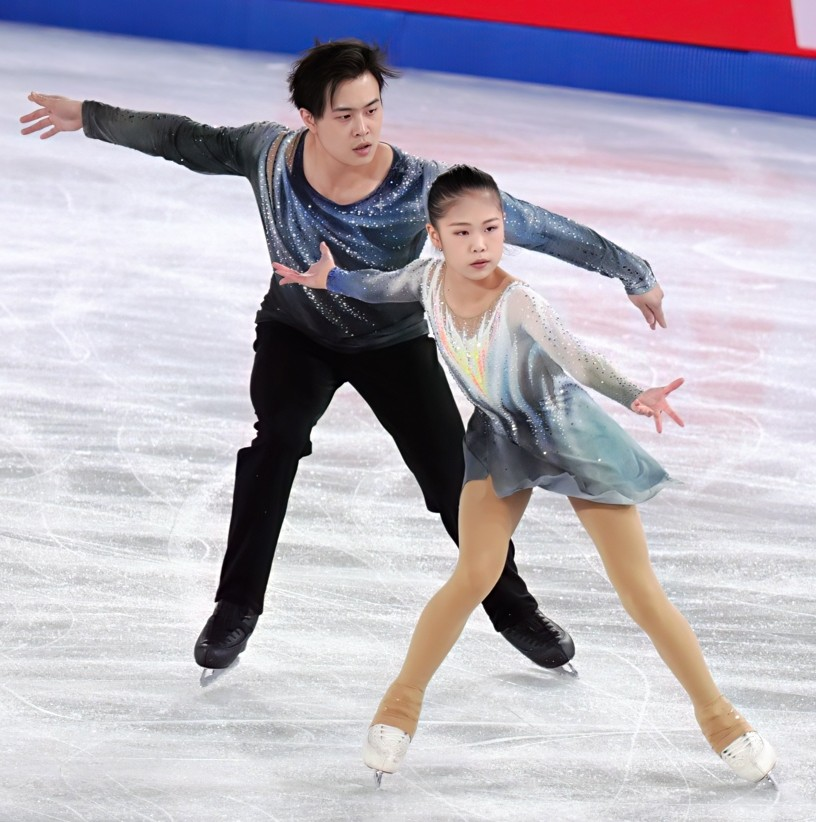
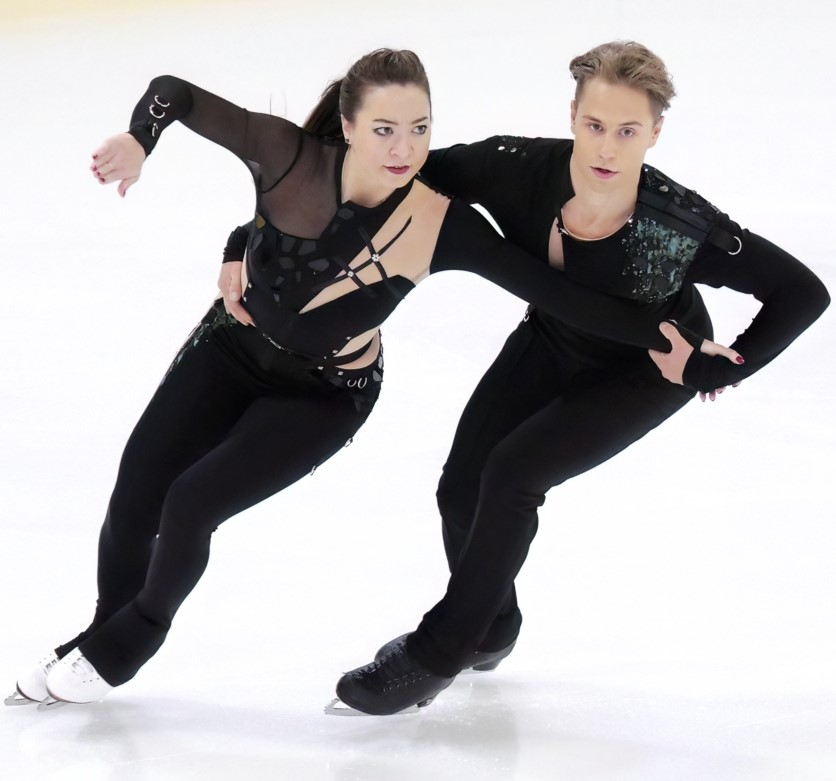
The 2025 Skate to Milano champions: Petr Gumennik of Russia (men's singles); Adeliia Petrosian of Russia (women's singles); Zhang Jiaxuan and Huang Yihang of China (pair skating); and Allison Reed and Saulius Ambrulevičius of Lithuania (ice dance)

Medalists
Discipline	Gold	Silver	Bronze
Men	(Individual Neutral Athletes) Petr Gumennik	(South Korea) Kim Hyun-gyeom	(Mexico) Donovan Carrillo
Women	(Individual Neutral Athletes) Adeliia Petrosian	(Georgia (country)) Anastasiia Gubanova	(Belgium) Loena Hendrickx
Pairs	(China); Zhang Jiaxuan; Huang Yihang	(Armenia); Karina Akopova; Nikita Rakhmanin	(Japan); Yuna Nagaoka; Sumitada Moriguchi
Ice dance	(Lithuania); Allison Reed; Saulius Ambrulevičius	(Australia); Holly Harris; Jason Chan	(Spain); Sofía Val; Asaf Kazimov

== Results ==
=== Men's singles ===
Petr Gumennik of Russia earned a spot at the 2026 Winter Olympics as an Individual Neutral Athlete. Gumennik led after the short program, and despite some errors on his quadruple Lutz and quadruple loop, he finished first in the free skate and won the competition. The other four quota spots in men's singles were awarded to South Korea, Mexico, Ukraine, and Chinese Taipei. As Mexico's highest-ranked men's skater, Donovan Carrillo would undoubtedly be chosen to compete at the Olympics. "It's what I was dreaming, what I've been working for, and I'm just so happy that it's now a reality and also excited for the next chapter," Carrillo stated after learning that he had qualified for the Olympics. Li Yu-Hsiang of Taiwan finished in fifth place, earning Chinese Taipei its first Olympic berth since David Liu competed at the 1998 Winter Olympics.

Men's results
Rank	Skater	Nation	Total points	SP		FS	
1st place, gold medalist(s)	Petr Gumennik	Individual Neutral Athletes	262.82	1	93.80	1	169.02
2nd place, silver medalist(s)	Kim Hyun-gyeom	South Korea	228.60	4	74.69	2	153.91
3rd place, bronze medalist(s)	Donovan Carrillo	Mexico	222.36	2	84.97	9	137.39
4	Kyrylo Marsak	Ukraine	217.57	6	72.33	4	145.24
5	Li Yu-Hsiang	Chinese Taipei	216.98	8	70.31	3	146.67
6	Davide Lewton Brain	Monaco	216.12	5	73.56	5	142.56
7	François Pitot	France	214.57	3	81.24	11	133.33
8	Georgii Reshtenko	Czech Republic	213.06	7	71.03	6	142.03
9	Genrikh Gartung	Germany	211.17	9	69.51	7	141.66
10	Tamir Kuperman	Israel	201.60	16	63.82	8	137.78
11	Semen Daniliants	Armenia	200.00	17	63.59	10	136.41
12	Aleksandr Vlasenko	Hungary	194.18	11	68.30	12	125.88
13	Jari Kessler	Croatia	190.54	12	66.50	14	124.04
14	Dias Jirenbayev	Kazakhstan	189.14	15	64.92	13	124.22
15	Maurizio Zandron	Austria	188.95	14	66.21	15	122.74
16	Yauhenii Puzanau	Individual Neutral Athletes	185.15	13	66.38	17	118.77
17	Douglas Gerber	Australia	182.84	18	62.08	16	120.76
18	Edward Appleby	Great Britain	174.12	10	69.35	21	104.77
19	Jarvis Ho	Hong Kong	164.00	23	51.91	18	112.09
20	Burak Demirboğa	Turkey	163.97	19	61.02	22	102.95
21	Valtter Virtanen	Finland	163.19	21	56.95	19	106.24
22	Paolo Borromeo	Philippines	158.46	22	52.77	20	105.69
23	Fang Ze Zeng	Malaysia	155.87	20	57.27	23	98.60
24	Dillon Judge	Ireland	133.73	24	50.20	24	83.53
25	Gabriel Martínez	Ecuador	124.23	25	43.94	25	80.29
26	David Gouveia	Portugal	109.21	26	43.13	26	66.08

=== Women's singles ===
Adeliia Petrosian of Russia and Viktoriia Safonova of Belarus each earned a spot at the 2026 Winter Olympics as Individual Neutral Athletes. The other three quota spots in women's singles were awarded to Georgia, Belgium, and China. Petrosian had led after the short program, and maintained her lead with a "passionate tango program" that featured seven clean triple jumps. Safonova had been in seventh place after the short program, but rallied back in the free skate to finish in fourth place. Anastasiia Gubanova had had a very disappointing performance at the 2025 World Figure Skating Championships, which left Georgia without a berth for the Olympics, but she redeemed herself with a silver medal finish and a quota spot for Georgia. Likewise, Loena Hendrickx, who had missed almost the entire 2024–25 season due to injury, was able to secure a second quota spot for Belgium with her "sophisticated flamenco program" that featured five triple jumps and precise spins. "For me, this competition was very important after coming back from my injury; I am proud to stand here again. I know I can do better, but I am satisfied and happy how this competition went," Hendrickx stated afterward.

Women's results
Rank	Skater	Nation	Total points	SP		FS	
1st place, gold medalist(s)	Adeliia Petrosian	Individual Neutral Athletes	209.63	1	68.72	1	140.91
2nd place, silver medalist(s)	Anastasiia Gubanova	Georgia	206.23	2	68.08	2	138.15
3rd place, bronze medalist(s)	Loena Hendrickx	Belgium	204.96	3	66.92	3	138.04
4	Viktoriia Safonova	Individual Neutral Athletes	181.91	7	57.71	4	124.20
5	Zhang Ruiyang	China	179.76	4	62.78	6	116.98
6	Stefania Yakovleva	Cyprus	177.53	5	59.37	5	118.16
7	Mia Risa Gomez	Norway	161.69	6	59.30	7	102.39
8	Kristina Lisovskaja	Estonia	158.69	8	57.36	8	101.33
9	Josefin Taljegård	Sweden	154.61	9	54.19	9	100.42
10	Petra Lahti	New Zealand	148.14	11	53.40	11	94.74
11	Andrea Montesinos Cantú	Mexico	148.10	10	53.59	12	94.51
12	Nargiz Süleymanova	Azerbaijan	142.55	13	50.47	15	92.08
13	Vanesa Šelmeková	Slovakia	141.15	15	44.42	10	96.73
14	Julija Lovrenčič	Slovenia	140.01	12	51.94	16	88.07
15	Gian-Quen Isaacs	South Africa	135.93	19	43.16	14	92.77
16	Anastasia Gracheva	Moldova	135.61	20	41.84	13	93.77
17	Chan Tsz Ching	Hong Kong	129.83	18	43.38	17	86.45
18	Audrey Lee	Malaysia	126.66	16	43.66	18	83.00
19	Michaela Vrašťáková	Czech Republic	123.53	21	40.63	19	82.90
20	Antonina Dubinina	Serbia	122.41	17	43.59	20	78.82
21	Maxine Bautista	Philippines	117.09	14	44.99	21	72.10
22	Sophia Natalie Dayan	Argentina	107.48	23	37.34	22	70.14
23	Niki Wories	Netherlands	106.34	22	39.50	23	66.84
24	Victoria Alcantara	Australia	92.26	24	31.80	24	60.46
25	Dimitra Korri	Greece	87.08	25	27.55	25	59.53

=== Pairs ===
The three quota spots in pair skating were awarded to China, Armenia, and Japan. Zhang Jiaxuan and Huang Yihang, who had won the 2025 Junior Grand Prix of Figure Skating Final, finished first in both the short program and the free skate, securing another berth for China at the 2026 Winter Olympics. Although Zhang and Huang won this competition, they were still not guaranteed a spot at the Olympics, as China had several dominant pairs teams. "At this competition, we showed our level from what we can do in practice," Huang stated afterward. Karina Akopova and Nikita Rakhmanin finished in second place, earning Armenia its first Olympic berth in pair skating since Maria Krasiltseva and Artem Znachkov competed at the 2002 Winter Olympics. Yuna Nagaoka and Sumitada Moriguchi of Japan had finished in fourth place after the short program, but rallied back in the free skate to finish third overall and earn Japan another Olympic berth.

Pairs results
Rank	Team	Nation	Total points	SP		FS	
1st place, gold medalist(s)	Zhang Jiaxuan; Huang Yihang	China	191.52	1	66.68	1	124.84
2nd place, silver medalist(s)	Karina Akopova; Nikita Rakhmanin	Armenia	186.84	3	63.85	2	122.99
3rd place, bronze medalist(s)	Yuna Nagaoka; Sumitada Moriguchi	Japan	178.66	4	62.68	3	115.98
4	Camille Kovalev; Pavel Kovalev	France	171.58	2	64.28	5	107.30
5	Sofiia Holichenko; Artem Darenskyi	Ukraine	169.41	6	57.17	4	112.24
6	Audrey Shin; Balázs Nagy	United States	158.66	7	53.99	6	104.67
7	Anna Valesi; Martin Bidař	Czech Republic	156.11	5	57.17	7	98.94
8	Júlía Sylvía Gunnarsdóttir; Manuel Piazza	Iceland	152.03	9	53.14	8	98.94
9	Sophia Schaller; Livio Mayr	Austria	139.86	10	53.09	10	89.04
10	Ryom Tae-ok; Han Kum-chol	North Korea	138.30	11	50.82	9	91.35
11	Isabella Gamez; Aleksandr Korovin	Philippines	133.69	8	53.14	11	80.55

=== Ice dance ===
The four quota spots in ice dance were awarded to Lithuania, Australia, Spain, and China. Allison Reed and Saulius Ambrulevičius won the ice dance event by a significant margin. They had narrowly missed out on earning Lithuania a quota spot to the 2026 Winter Olympics when they finished in twenty-first place at the 2025 World Figure Skating Championships. Their bid to compete at the 2022 Winter Olympics had also been thwarted when Reed's application for Lithuanian citizenship was denied. "We're there to perform, we're there to place, and our goals are way, way higher and, just really, really looking forward to representing Lithuania," Reed stated. Holly Harris and Jason Chan had also narrowly missed out on competing at the 2022 Winter Olympics, and also narrowly missed out on earning Australia an Olympic berth at the 2025 World Championships. They finished in second place in both the rhythm dance and free dance. Sofía Val and Asaf Kazimov of Spain had been in fifth place after the rhythm dance, but lucked out when Utana Yoshida and Masaya Morita of Japan, who had been in fourth place after the rhythm dance, scored lower enough in the free dance to allow Val and Kazimov to earn Spain a second quota spot in ice dance.

Ice dance results
Rank	Team	Nation	Total points	RD		FD	
1st place, gold medalist(s)	Allison Reed; Saulius Ambrulevičius	Lithuania	198.73	1	80.95	1	117.78
2nd place, silver medalist(s)	Holly Harris; Jason Chan	Australia	183.50	2	73.35	2	110.15
3rd place, bronze medalist(s)	Sofía Val; Asaf Kazimov	Spain	170.32	5	68.35	4	101.97
4	Wang Shiyue; Liu Xinyu	China	168.83	6	67.59	5	101.24
5	Milla Ruud Reitan; Nikolaj Majorov	Sweden	168.60	3	69.30	6	99.30
6	Mariia Ignateva; Danijil Szemko	Hungary	167.73	7	64.58	3	103.15
7	Utana Yoshida; Masaya Morita	Japan	167.63	4	69.14	7	98.49
8	Giulia Isabella Paolino; Andrea Tuba	Italy	158.52	12	60.04	8	98.48
9	Carolane Soucisse; Shane Firus	Ireland	158.42	8	64.53	11	93.89
10	Shira Ichilov; Mikhail Nosovitskiy	Israel	157.65	9	62.55	10	95.10
11	Angelina Kudryavtseva; Ilia Karankevich	Cyprus	156.31	11	60.87	9	95.44
12	Mariia Pinchuk; Mykyta Pogorielov	Ukraine	153.81	10	62.11	12	91.70
13	Maria Kazakova; Vladislav Kasinskij	Georgia	148.78	13	59.53	13	89.25
14	Sofiia Dovhal; Wiktor Kulesza	Poland	141.74	14	56.43	14	85.31
15	Gaukhar Nauryzova; Boyisangur Datiev	Kazakhstan	134.78	16	50.64	15	84.14
16	Chelsea Verhaegh; Sherim van Geffen	Netherlands	127.54	18	48.15	17	79.39
17	Samantha Ritter; Daniel Brykalov	Azerbaijan	125.63	19	45.78	16	79.85
18	Kristina Dobroserdova; Alessandro Pelegrini	Armenia	125.11	15	52.27	19	72.84
19	Harlow Lynella Stanley; Seiji Urano	Mexico	123.38	17	49.82	18	73.56

== Olympic qualification event ==
At Skate to Milano, a total of five quota spots were granted in each singles events, three in the pairs event, and four in the ice dance event.

Men's singles	Women's singles	Pairs	Ice dance
(Individual Neutral Athletes) Petr Gumennik; South Korea; Mexico; Ukraine; Chinese Taipei	(Individual Neutral Athletes) Adeliia Petrosian; Georgia; Belgium (Individual Neutral Athletes) Viktoriia Safonova; China	China; Armenia; Japan	Lithuania; Australia; Spain; China

== Works cited ==
- "Special Regulations & Technical Rules – Single & Pair Skating and Ice Dance 2024" (PDF). International Skating Union. Archived (PDF) from the original on 3 June 2025.
