= Figure skating at the 2012 Winter Youth Olympics – Pair skating =

Pairs at the I Winter Youth Olympic Games
- Venue: Olympiahalle
- Dates: January 14; January 16
- Competitors: 10 from 4 nations

The pair skating competition of the 2012 Winter Youth Olympics was held at the Olympiahalle in Innsbruck on January 14 (short program) and January 16 (free skating), 2012.

== Results ==
=== Short program results ===
Pl.	Name	Nation	TSS	TES	PCS	SS	TR	PE	CH	IN	Ded	StN
1	Yu Xiaoyu / Jin Yang	China	51.79	29.56	22.23	5.79	5.39	5.61	5.61	5.39	0.00	1
2	Lina Fedorova / Maxim Miroshkin	Russia	49.32	27.34	21.98	5.57	5.36	5.50	5.61	5.43	0.00	2
3	Anastasia Dolidze / Vadim Ivanov	Russia	38.75	19.50	19.25	4.89	4.64	4.82	4.93	4.79	0.00	4
4	Caitlin Belt / Michael Johnson	United States	38.65	21.02	17.63	4.50	4.25	4.50	4.43	4.36	0.00	3
5	Ielizaveta Usmantseva / Vladislav Lysoy	Ukraine	34.81	18.80	16.01	4.18	3.86	4.04	4.07	3.86	0.00	5

=== Free program results ===
Pl.	Name	Nation	TSS	TES	PCS	SS	TR	PE	CH	IN	Ded	StN
1	Yu Xiaoyu / Jin Yang	China	102.03	54.02	48.01	6.07	5.79	6.11	6.04	6.00	0.00	3
2	Lina Fedorova / Maxim Miroshkin	Russia	84.87	41.06	46.81	5.68	5.54	6.04	5.96	6.04	3.00	5
3	Anastasia Dolidze / Vadim Ivanov	Russia	73.97	34.77	39.20	5.14	4.75	4.86	5.00	4.75	0.00	4
4	Caitlin Belt / Michael Johnson	United States	70.96	34.36	36.60	4.71	4.39	4.64	4.57	4.57	0.00	1
5	Ielizaveta Usmantseva / Vladislav Lysoy	Ukraine	60.54	31.84	30.70	4.11	3.75	3.75	3.86	3.71	2.00	2

=== Overall Results ===
Pl.	Name	Nation	Total points	SP	FS
1	Yu Xiaoyu / Jin Yang	China	153.82	1	1
2	Lina Fedorova / Maxim Miroshkin	Russia	134.19	2	2
3	Anastasia Dolidze / Vadim Ivanov	Russia	112.72	3	3
4	Caitlin Belt / Michael Johnson	United States	109.61	4	4
5	Ielizaveta Usmantseva / Vladislav Lysoy	Ukraine	95.35	5	5
