= 2021 CS Denis Ten Memorial Challenge =

Figure skating competition

- Type: ISU Challenger Series
- Date: October 28 – 31
- Season: 2021–22
- Location: Nur-Sultan, Kazakhstan
- Host: National Skating Federation of the Republic of Kazakhstan
- Venue: Barys Arena Ice Palace

Champions
- Men's singles: (Russia) Petr Gumennik
- Women's singles: (Belarus) Viktoriia Safonova
- Ice dance: (Russia) Anastasia Skoptsova / Kirill Aleshin
- Previous: 2019 Denis Ten Memorial Challenge
- Next: 2022 CS Denis Ten Memorial Challenge
- Previous CS: 2021 CS Finlandia Trophy
- Next CS: 2021 CS Cup of Austria

The 2021 CS Denis Ten Memorial Challenge was held on October 28–31, 2021 in Nur-Sultan, Kazakhstan. It was part of the 2021–22 ISU Challenger Series. Medals were awarded in the disciplines of men's singles, women's singles, and ice dance.

== Entries ==
The International Skating Union published the list of entries on September 28, 2021.

Country	Men	Women	Ice dance
Azerbaijan		Ekaterina Ryabova	
Belarus		Viktoriia Safonova	Viktoria Semenjuk / Ilya Yukhimuk
Bulgaria		Alexandra Feigin	
Czech Republic	Georgii Reshtenko		
Estonia	Aleksandr Selevko; Mihhail Selevko		
Finland	Valtter Virtanen	Emmi Peltonen	
France		Maïa Mazzara	Marie Dupayage / Thomas Nabais; Lou Terreaux / Noé Perron
Georgia	Nika Egadze		
Germany		Kristina Isaev; Nargiz Süleymanova	
Kazakhstan	Rakhat Bralin; Dias Jirenbayev; Mikhail Shaidorov	Anastassiya Lobanova; Bagdana Rakhishova; Nuriya Suleimen; Yasmin Tekik	Gaukhar Nauryzova / Boyisangur Datiev
Russia	Petr Gumennik; Mark Kondratiuk; Andrei Mozalev		Elizaveta Khudaiberdieva / Egor Bazin; Anastasia Skoptcova / Kirill Aleshin
Ukraine	Ivan Shmuratko	Anastasiia Shabotova	Alexandra Nazarova / Maxim Nikitin

=== Changes to preliminary assignments ===
Date	Discipline	Withdrew	Added	Reason/Other notes	Refs
September 29	Women	(Austria) Olga Mikutina			
September 29	Women	(Belarus) Varvara Kisel	(Belarus) Viktoriia Safonova	Not senior age-eligible	
September 30	Men	(Russia) Matvei Vetlugin	(Russia) Petr Gumennik		
September 30	Ice dance	(Israel) Shira Ichilov / Laurent Abecassis		Abecassis retired	
October 6	Ice dance	(Latvia) Aurelija Ipolito / Luke Russell			
October 13	Men	(Israel) Mark Gorodnitsky			
October 13	Men	(Israel) Daniel Samohin			
October 13	Women	(Israel) Alina Iushchenkova	(Australia) Kailani Craine		
October 13	Women	(Israel) Taylor Morris			
October 13	Women	(Israel) Alina Soupian			
October 13	Women	(Russia) Anna Frolova			
October 13	Ice dance	(Estonia) Aleksandra Samersova / Kevin Ojala			
October 16	Women	(Russia) Kseniia Sinitsyna			
October 16	Ice dance	(Russia) Victoria Sinitsina / Nikita Katsalapov			
October 19	Women	(Netherlands) Niki Wories			
October 22	Men	(Israel) Alexei Bychenko			
October 22	Women	(Bulgaria) Maria Levushkina			
October 22	Ice dance	(Israel) Mariia Nosovitskaya / Mikhail Nosovitskiy			
October 22	Ice dance	(Kazakhstan) Maxine Weatherby / Temirlan Yerzhanov			
October 27	Women	(Germany) Aya Hatakawa			
October 27	Women	(Poland) Elżbieta Gabryszak			
October 27	Ice dance	(Estonia) Solène Mazingue / Marko Jevgeni Gaidajenko			
October 27	Ice dance	(France) Julia Wagret / Pierre Souquet-Basiege			
October 28	Women	(Australia) Kailani Craine			

== Results ==
=== Men ===
Rank	Name	Nation	Total points	SP		FS	
1	Petr Gumennik	Russia	263.14	1	91.84	1	171.30
2	Mark Kondratiuk	Russia	250.08	2	84.79	2	165.29
3	Andrei Mozalev	Russia	234.05	5	72.76	3	161.29
4	Nika Egadze	Georgia	223.65	6	69.65	4	154.00
5	Ivan Shmuratko	Ukraine	208.66	4	76.94	6	131.72
6	Aleksandr Selevko	Estonia	201.03	8	67.52	5	133.51
7	Mihhail Selevko	Estonia	200.08	3	78.80	10	121.28
8	Georgii Reshtenko	Czech Republic	190.12	7	68.37	9	121.75
9	Mikhail Shaidorov	Kazakhstan	187.07	10	57.45	7	129.62
10	Dias Jirenbayev	Kazakhstan	179.02	11	52.63	8	126.39
11	Valtter Virtanen	Finland	177.47	9	64.39	11	113.08
12	Rakhat Bralin	Kazakhstan	151.15	12	50.75	12	100.40

=== Women ===
Rank	Name	Nation	Total points	SP		FS	
1	Viktoriia Safonova	Belarus	190.06	1	66.67	1	123.39
2	Ekaterina Ryabova	Azerbaijan	179.50	3	63.77	2	115.73
3	Anastasiia Shabotova	Ukraine	175.21	2	63.92	3	111.29
4	Emmi Peltonen	Finland	160.91	4	53.71	4	107.20
5	Alexandra Feigin	Bulgaria	146.52	5	51.98	5	94.54
6	Nargiz Süleymanova	Germany	136.99	6	49.98	7	87.01
7	Kristina Isaev	Germany	135.62	7	47.63	6	87.99
8	Anastassiya Lobanova	Kazakhstan	96.58	10	32.78	8	63.80
9	Yasmin Tekik	Kazakhstan	96.07	8	36.96	10	59.11
10	Bagdana Rakhishova	Kazakhstan	94.08	11	32.06	9	62.02
WD	Maïa Mazzara	France	withdrew	9	34.27	withdrew from competition	
WD	Nuriya Suleimen	Kazakhstan	withdrew from competition				

=== Ice dance ===
Rank	Name	Nation	Total points	RD		FD	
1	Anastasia Skoptsova / Kirill Aleshin	Russia	195.06	1	78.39	1	116.67
2	Alexandra Nazarova / Maxim Nikitin	Ukraine	188.64	3	75.46	2	113.18
3	Elizaveta Khudaiberdieva / Egor Bazin	Russia	186.80	2	77.08	3	109.72
4	Viktoria Semenjuk / Ilya Yukhimuk	Belarus	156.26	4	63.07	4	93.19
5	Marie Dupayage / Thomas Nabais	France	149.90	6	59.81	5	90.09
6	Lou Terreaux / Noé Perron	France	145.73	5	60.48	6	85.25
7	Gaukhar Nauryzova / Boyisangur Datiev	Kazakhstan	130.10	7	55.49	7	74.61
