= 2021–22 ISU Challenger Series =

- Type: ISU Challenger Series
- Date: September 10 – December 11, 2021
- Season: 2021–22
- Previous: 2020–21 ISU Challenger Series
- Next: 2022–23 ISU Challenger Series

The 2021–22 ISU Challenger Series was held from September to December 2021. It was the eighth season that the ISU Challenger Series, a group of senior-level international figure skating competitions, was held.

== Competitions ==
This season, the series included the following events.

The 2021 Asian Open Trophy, which was held on October 13–17 in Beijing, China, was intended to be a Challenger Series event. However, as only the men's and women's singles events featured international participants and the total number of ISU member nations represented at the event totaled nine, it did not meet the necessary criteria to qualify for Challenger Series status.

Date	Event	Location	Notes	Results
September 10–12	(Italy) 2021 Lombardia Trophy	Bergamo, Italy	No pairs	Details
September 16–18	(Canada) 2021 Autumn Classic International	Pierrefonds, Quebec, Canada	Men's singles competition did not qualify as a Challenger Series event	Details
September 22–25	(Germany) 2021 Nebelhorn Trophy	Oberstdorf, Germany	Olympic qualifying event	Details
September 30 – October 2	(Slovakia) 2021 Nepela Memorial	Cancelled		
October 7–10	(Finland) 2021 Finlandia Trophy	Espoo, Finland		Details
October 28–31	(Kazakhstan) 2021 Denis Ten Memorial Challenge	Nur-Sultan, Kazakhstan	No pairs	Details
November 11–14	2021 Cup of Austria	Graz, Austria	No pairs	Details
November 18–21	(Poland) 2021 Warsaw Cup	Warsaw, Poland		Details
December 8–11	(Croatia) 2021 Golden Spin of Zagreb	Sisak, Croatia		Details

== Requirements ==
Skaters were eligible to compete on the Challenger Series if they had reached the age of 15 before July 1, 2021.

== Medal summary ==
=== Men's singles ===
Competition	Gold	Silver	Bronze	Results
(Italy) Lombardia Trophy	(Italy) Daniel Grassl	(France) Adam Siao Him Fa	(Georgia (country)) Morisi Kvitelashvili	Details
(Canada) Autumn Classic International	Competition did not qualify as a Challenger Series event			
(Germany) Nebelhorn Trophy	(United States) Vincent Zhou	(France) Adam Siao Him Fa	(Russia) Mark Kondratiuk	Details
(Finland) Finlandia Trophy	(United States) Jason Brown	(Russia) Mikhail Kolyada	(Russia) Dmitri Aliev	Details
(Kazakhstan) Denis Ten Memorial Challenge	(Russia) Petr Gumennik	(Russia) Mark Kondratiuk	(Russia) Andrei Mozalev	Details
Cup of Austria	(Georgia (country)) Nika Egadze	(Japan) Lucas Tsuyoshi Honda	(United States) Ilia Malinin	Details
(Poland) Warsaw Cup	(Japan) Sōta Yamamoto	(Italy) Daniel Grassl	(Russia) Petr Gumennik	Details
(Croatia) Golden Spin of Zagreb	(Canada) Keegan Messing	(Russia) Andrei Mozalev	(United States) Jimmy Ma	Details

=== Women's singles ===
Competition	Gold	Silver	Bronze	Results
(Italy) Lombardia Trophy	(United States) Alysa Liu	(Poland) Ekaterina Kurakova	(United States) Audrey Shin	Details
(Canada) Autumn Classic International	(Cyprus) Marilena Kitromilis	(South Korea) You Young	(South Korea) Ji Seo-yeon	Details
(Germany) Nebelhorn Trophy	(United States) Alysa Liu	(Poland) Ekaterina Kurakova	(Belarus) Viktoriia Safonova	Details
(Finland) Finlandia Trophy	(Russia) Kamila Valieva	(Russia) Elizaveta Tuktamysheva	(Russia) Alena Kostornaia	Details
(Kazakhstan) Denis Ten Memorial Challenge	(Belarus) Viktoriia Safonova	(Azerbaijan) Ekaterina Ryabova	(Ukraine) Anastasiia Shabotova	Details
Cup of Austria	(Japan) Wakaba Higuchi	(South Korea) Park Yeon-jeong	(Estonia) Niina Petrõkina	Details
(Poland) Warsaw Cup	(Russia) Maiia Khromykh	(Estonia) Niina Petrõkina	(Poland) Ekaterina Kurakova	Details
(Croatia) Golden Spin of Zagreb	(Georgia (country)) Anastasiia Gubanova	(United States) Amber Glenn	(Estonia) Niina Petrõkina	Details

=== Pairs ===
Competition	Gold	Silver	Bronze	Results
(Canada) Autumn Classic International	(Japan) Riku Miura / Ryuichi Kihara	(Canada) Vanessa James / Eric Radford	(United States) Ashley Cain-Gribble / Timothy LeDuc	Details
(Germany) Nebelhorn Trophy	(Germany) Minerva Fabienne Hase / Nolan Seegert	(Spain) Laura Barquero / Marco Zandron	(Georgia (country)) Karina Safina / Luka Berulava	Details
(Finland) Finlandia Trophy	(Russia) Anastasia Mishina / Aleksandr Galliamov	(Russia) Evgenia Tarasova / Vladimir Morozov	(United States) Ashley Cain-Gribble / Timothy LeDuc	Details
(Poland) Warsaw Cup	(Russia) Evgenia Tarasova / Vladimir Morozov	(United States) Jessica Calalang / Brian Johnson	(Russia) Yasmina Kadyrova / Ivan Balchenko	Details
(Croatia) Golden Spin of Zagreb	(United States) Audrey Lu / Misha Mitrofanov	(Georgia (country)) Anastasiia Metelkina / Daniil Parkman	(Russia) Iuliia Artemeva / Mikhail Nazarychev	Details

=== Ice dance ===
Competition	Gold	Silver	Bronze	Results
(Italy) Lombardia Trophy	(Italy) Charlène Guignard / Marco Fabbri	(Canada) Laurence Fournier Beaudry / Nikolaj Sørensen	(Spain) Sara Hurtado / Kirill Khaliavin	Details
(Canada) Autumn Classic International	(Canada) Piper Gilles / Paul Poirier	(Spain) Olivia Smart / Adrián Díaz	(United States) Caroline Green / Michael Parsons	Details
(Germany) Nebelhorn Trophy	(Finland) Juulia Turkkila / Matthias Versluis	(Germany) Katharina Müller / Tim Dieck	(Georgia (country)) Maria Kazakova / Georgy Reviya	Details
(Finland) Finlandia Trophy	(France) Gabriella Papadakis / Guillaume Cizeron	(United States) Madison Chock / Evan Bates	(United Kingdom) Lilah Fear / Lewis Gibson	Details
(Kazakhstan) Denis Ten Memorial Challenge	(Russia) Anastasia Skoptsova / Kirill Aleshin	(Ukraine) Oleksandra Nazarova / Maxim Nikitin	(Russia) Elizaveta Khudaiberdieva / Egor Bazin	Details
Cup of Austria	(Italy) Charlène Guignard / Marco Fabbri	(Canada) Laurence Fournier Beaudry / Nikolaj Sørensen	(Spain) Olivia Smart / Adrián Díaz	Details
(Poland) Warsaw Cup	(Russia) Diana Davis / Gleb Smolkin	(Japan) Kana Muramoto / Daisuke Takahashi	(United States) Caroline Green / Michael Parsons	Details
(Croatia) Golden Spin of Zagreb	(United States) Kaitlin Hawayek / Jean-Luc Baker	(Lithuania) Allison Reed / Saulius Ambrulevičius	(Russia) Elizaveta Shanaeva / Devid Naryzhnyy	Details

=== Medal standings ===
Rank	Nation	Gold	Silver	Bronze	Total
1	Russia	7	5	9	21
2	United States	6	3	7	16
3	Japan	3	2	0	5
4	Italy	3	1	0	4
5	Canada	2	3	0	5
6	Georgia	2	1	3	6
7	France	1	2	0	3
8	Germany	1	1	0	2
9	Belarus	1	0	1	2
10	Cyprus	1	0	0	1
10	Finland	1	0	0	1
12	Spain	0	2	2	4
13	Poland	0	2	1	3
13	South Korea	0	2	1	3
15	Estonia	0	1	2	3
16	Ukraine	0	1	1	2
17	Azerbaijan	0	1	0	1
17	Lithuania	0	1	0	1
19	Great Britain	0	0	1	1
Totals (19 entries)		28	28	28	84

== Challenger Series rankings ==
The ISU Challenger Series rankings were formed by combining the two highest final scores of each skater or team.

=== Men’s singles ===
As of December 15, 2021.

No.	Skater	Nation	First event	Score	Second event	Score	Total score
1	Petr Gumennik	Russia	Denis Ten Memorial Challenge	263.14	Warsaw Cup	242.91	506.05
2	Keegan Messing	Canada	Finlandia Trophy	242.58	Golden Spin of Zagreb	255.07	497.65
3	Mark Kondratiuk	Russia	Nebelhorn Trophy	241.06	Denis Ten Memorial Challenge	250.08	491.14
4	Daniel Grassl	Italy	Lombardia Trophy	247.80	Warsaw Cup	242.96	490.76
5	Andrei Mozalev	Russia	Denis Ten Memorial Challenge	234.05	Golden Spin of Zagreb	252.15	486.20

=== Women’s singles ===
As of December 15, 2021.

No.	Skater	Nation	First event	Score	Second event	Score	Total score
1	Alysa Liu	United States	Lombardia Trophy	219.24	Nebelhorn Trophy	207.40	426.64
2	Anastasiia Gubanova	Georgia	Finlandia Trophy	203.91	Golden Spin of Zagreb	184.29	388.20
3	Ekaterina Kurakova	Poland	Nebelhorn Trophy	193.58	Warsaw Cup	187.80	381.38
4	Viktoriia Safonova	Belarus	Nebelhorn Trophy	190.29	Denis Ten Memorial Challenge	190.06	380.35
5	Karen Chen	United States	Autumn Classic International	173.00	Finlandia Trophy	202.49	375.49

=== Pairs ===
As of December 15, 2021.

No.	Team	Nation	First event	Score	Second event	Score	Total score
1	Evgenia Tarasova / Vladimir Morozov	Russia	Finlandia Trophy	213.72	Warsaw Cup	228.49	442.21
2	Jessica Calalang / Brian Johnson	United States	Finlandia Trophy	191.89	Warsaw Cup	196.85	388.74
3	Vanessa James / Eric Radford	Canada	Finlandia Trophy	190.58	Golden Spin of Zagreb	187.57	378.15
4	Anastasiia Metelkina / Daniil Parkman	Georgia	Warsaw Cup	184.24	Golden Spin of Zagreb	189.60	373.84
5	Minerva Fabienne Hase / Nolan Seegert	Germany	Nebelhorn Trophy	185.25	Finlandia Trophy	188.37	373.62

=== Ice dance ===
As of December 15, 2021.

No.	Team	Nation	First event	Score	Second event	Score	Total score
1	Charlène Guignard / Marco Fabbri	Italy	Lombardia Trophy	205.36	Cup of Austria	208.88	414.24
2	Diana Davis / Gleb Smolkin	Russia	Cup of Austria	184.62	Warsaw Cup	199.90	384.52
3	Olivia Smart / Adrián Díaz	Spain	Autumn Classic International	191.31	Cup of Austria	189.88	381.19
4	Laurence Fournier Beaudry / Nikolaj Sørensen	Canada	Lombardia Trophy	185.26	Cup of Austria	194.67	379.93
5	Caroline Green / Michael Parsons	United States	Autumn Classic International	188.43	Warsaw Cup	187.84	376.27

== Top scores ==
=== Men's singles ===
Top 10 best scores in the men's combined total
No.	Skater	Nation	Score	Event
1	Vincent Zhou	United States	284.23	2021 Nebelhorn Trophy
2	Petr Gumennik	Russia	263.14	2021 Denis Ten Memorial Challenge
3	Jason Brown	United States	262.52	2021 Finlandia Trophy
4	Mikhail Kolyada	Russia	256.98	2021 Finlandia Trophy
5	Keegan Messing	Canada	255.07	2021 Golden Spin of Zagreb
6	Andrei Mozalev	Russia	252.15	2021 Golden Spin of Zagreb
7	Jimmy Ma	United States	250.97	2021 Golden Spin of Zagreb
8	Mark Kondratiuk	Russia	250.08	2021 Denis Ten Memorial Challenge
9	Deniss Vasiļjevs	Latvia	250.07	2021 Golden Spin of Zagreb
10	Dmitri Aliev	Russia	249.25	2021 Finlandia Trophy

Top 10 best scores in the men's short program
No.	Skater	Nation	Score	Event
1	Vincent Zhou	United States	97.35	2021 Nebelhorn Trophy
2	Jason Brown	United States	92.39	2021 Finlandia Trophy
2	Keegan Messing	Canada	92.39	2021 Finlandia Trophy
4	Petr Gumennik	Russia	91.84	2021 Denis Ten Memorial Challenge
5	Sōta Yamamoto	Japan	91.75	2021 Warsaw Cup
6	Koshiro Shimada	Japan	90.55	2021 Warsaw Cup
7	Adam Siao Him Fa	France	89.23	2021 Nebelhorn Trophy
8	Brendan Kerry	Australia	85.89	2021 Nebelhorn Trophy
9	Mark Kondratiuk	Russia	84.79	2021 Denis Ten Memorial Challenge
10	Deniss Vasiļjevs	Latvia	84.46	2021 Golden Spin of Zagreb

Top 10 best scores in the men's free skating
No.	Skater	Nation	Score	Event
1	Vincent Zhou	United States	186.88	2021 Nebelhorn Trophy
2	Matteo Rizzo	Italy	176.18	2021 Finlandia Trophy
3	Mikhail Kolyada	Russia	174.23	2021 Finlandia Trophy
4	Daniel Grassl	Italy	173.54	2021 Lombardia Trophy
5	Evgeni Semenenko	Russia	172.60	2021 Finlandia Trophy
6	Andrei Mozalev	Russia	171.44	2021 Golden Spin of Zagreb
7	Petr Gumennik	Russia	171.30	2021 Denis Ten Memorial Challenge
8	Dmitri Aliev	Russia	170.97	2021 Finlandia Trophy
9	Jason Brown	United States	170.13	2021 Finlandia Trophy
9	Jimmy Ma	United States	170.13	2021 Golden Spin of Zagreb

=== Women's singles ===
Top 10 best scores in the women's combined total
No.	Skater	Nation	Score	Event
1	Kamila Valieva	Russia	249.24	2021 Finlandia Trophy
2	Elizaveta Tuktamysheva	Russia	233.30	2021 Finlandia Trophy
3	Alysa Liu	United States	219.24	2021 Lombardia Trophy
4	Alena Kostornaia	Russia	218.83	2021 Finlandia Trophy
5	Loena Hendrickx	Belgium	212.07	2021 Finlandia Trophy
6	Anastasiia Gubanova	Georgia	203.91	2021 Finlandia Trophy
7	Karen Chen	United States	202.49	2021 Finlandia Trophy
8	Eva-Lotta Kiibus	Estonia	202.04	2021 Finlandia Trophy
9	Maiia Khromykh	Russia	194.02	2021 Warsaw Cup
10	Ekaterina Kurakova	Poland	193.58	2021 Nebelhorn Trophy

Top 10 best scores in the women's short program
No.	Skater	Nation	Score	Event
1	Elizaveta Tuktamysheva	Russia	81.53	2021 Finlandia Trophy
2	Wakaba Higuchi	Japan	79.73	2021 Cup of Austria
3	Alena Kostornaia	Russia	78.61	2021 Finlandia Trophy
4	Kamila Valieva	Russia	74.93	2021 Finlandia Trophy
5	Alysa Liu	United States	74.31	2021 Lombardia Trophy
6	Anastasiia Gubanova	Georgia	69.50	2021 Finlandia Trophy
7	Maiia Khromykh	Russia	69.24	2021 Warsaw Cup
8	Loena Hendrickx	Belgium	68.82	2021 Finlandia Trophy
9	Jenni Saarinen	Finland	68.71	2021 Warsaw Cup
10	Karen Chen	United States	67.50	2021 Finlandia Trophy

Top 10 best scores in the women's free skating
No.	Skater	Nation	Score	Event
1	Kamila Valieva	Russia	174.31	2021 Finlandia Trophy
2	Elizaveta Tuktamysheva	Russia	151.77	2021 Finlandia Trophy
3	Alysa Liu	United States	144.93	2021 Lombardia Trophy
4	Loena Hendrickx	Belgium	143.25	2021 Finlandia Trophy
5	Alena Kostornaia	Russia	140.22	2021 Finlandia Trophy
6	Eva-Lotta Kiibus	Estonia	137.51	2021 Finlandia Trophy
7	Karen Chen	United States	134.99	2021 Finlandia Trophy
8	Anastasiia Gubanova	Georgia	134.41	2021 Finlandia Trophy
9	Ekaterina Kurakova	Poland	132.54	2021 Nebelhorn Trophy
10	Viktoriia Safonova	Belarus	128.27	2021 Nebelhorn Trophy

=== Pairs ===
Top 10 best scores in the pairs' combined total
No.	Team	Nation	Score	Event
1	Evgenia Tarasova / Vladimir Morozov	Russia	228.49	2021 Warsaw Cup
2	Anastasia Mishina / Aleksandr Galliamov	Russia	227.13	2021 Finlandia Trophy
3	Riku Miura / Ryuichi Kihara	Japan	204.06	2021 Autumn Classic International
4	Jessica Calalang / Brian Johnson	United States	196.85	2021 Warsaw Cup
5	Audrey Lu / Misha Mitrofanov	United States	195.32	2021 Golden Spin of Zagreb
6	Ashley Cain-Gribble / Timothy LeDuc	United States	193.00	2021 Finlandia Trophy
7	Yasmina Kadyrova / Ivan Balchenko	Russia	192.94	2021 Warsaw Cup
8	Alina Pepeleva / Roman Pleshkov	Russia	190.93	2021 Warsaw Cup
9	Vanessa James / Eric Radford	Canada	190.58	2021 Finlandia Trophy
10	Laura Barquero / Marco Zandron	Spain	189.99	2021 Finlandia Trophy

Top 10 best scores in the pairs' short program
No.	Team	Nation	Score	Event
1	Evgenia Tarasova / Vladimir Morozov	Russia	79.76	2021 Warsaw Cup
2	Anastasia Mishina / Aleksandr Galliamov	Russia	73.76	2021 Finlandia Trophy
3	Riku Miura / Ryuichi Kihara	Japan	72.32	2021 Autumn Classic
4	Alina Pepeleva / Roman Pleshkov	Russia	69.42	2021 Warsaw Cup
5	Vanessa James / Eric Radford	Canada	68.29	2021 Autumn Classic
6	Yasmina Kadyrova / Ivan Balchenko	Russia	67.53	2021 Warsaw Cup
7	Karina Safina / Luka Berulava	Georgia	66.95	2021 Golden Spin of Zagreb
8	Alexa Knierim / Brandon Frazier	United States	66.44	2021 Golden Spin of Zagreb
9	Audrey Lu / Misha Mitrofanov	United States	66.41	2021 Golden Spin of Zagreb
10	Minerva Fabienne Hase / Nolan Seegert	Germany	66.26	2021 Nebelhorn Trophy

Top 10 best scores in the pairs' free skating
No.	Team	Nation	Score	Event
1	Anastasia Mishina / Aleksandr Galliamov	Russia	153.37	2021 Finlandia Trophy
2	Evgenia Tarasova / Vladimir Morozov	Russia	148.73	2021 Warsaw Cup
3	Jessica Calalang / Brian Johnson	United States	135.16	2021 Warsaw Cup
4	Riku Miura / Ryuichi Kihara	Japan	131.74	2021 Autumn Classic International
5	Vanessa James / Eric Radford	Canada	130.83	2021 Golden Spin of Zagreb
6	Audrey Lu / Misha Mitrofanov	United States	128.91	2021 Golden Spin of Zagreb
7	Iuliia Artemeva / Mikhail Nazarychev	Russia	128.11	2021 Golden Spin of Zagreb
8	Ashley Cain-Gribble / Timothy LeDuc	United States	128.02	2021 Finlandia Trophy
9	Yasmina Kadyrova / Ivan Balchenko	Russia	125.41	2021 Warsaw Cup
10	Laura Barquero / Marco Zandron	Spain	124.66	2021 Finlandia Trophy

=== Ice dance ===
Top 10 best scores in the combined total (ice dance)
No.	Team	Nation	Score	Event
1	Gabriella Papadakis / Guillaume Cizeron	France	217.54	2021 Finlandia Trophy
2	Piper Gilles / Paul Poirier	Canada	208.97	2021 Autumn Classic International
3	Charlène Guignard / Marco Fabbri	Italy	208.88	2021 Cup of Austria
4	Madison Chock / Evan Bates	United States	208.31	2021 Finlandia Trophy
5	Diana Davis / Gleb Smolkin	Russia	199.90	2021 Warsaw Cup
6	Anastasia Skoptsova / Kirill Aleshin	Russia	195.06	2021 Denis Ten Memorial Challenge
7	Laurence Fournier Beaudry / Nikolaj Sørensen	Canada	194.67	2021 Cup of Austria
8	Kaitlin Hawayek / Jean-Luc Baker	United States	191.32	2021 Golden Spin of Zagreb
9	Olivia Smart / Adrián Díaz	Spain	191.31	2021 Autumn Classic International
10	Lilah Fear / Lewis Gibson	Great Britain	190.39	2021 Finlandia Trophy

Top 10 best scores in the rhythm dance
No.	Team	Nation	Score	Event
1	Gabriella Papadakis / Guillaume Cizeron	France	85.58	2021 Finlandia Trophy
2	Madison Chock / Evan Bates	United States	83.72	2021 Finlandia Trophy
3	Piper Gilles / Paul Poirier	Canada	83.35	2021 Autumn Classic International
4	Charlène Guignard / Marco Fabbri	Italy	82.78	2021 Cup of Austria
5	Diana Davis / Gleb Smolkin	Russia	81.30	2021 Warsaw Cup
6	Olivia Smart / Adrián Díaz	Spain	78.53	2021 Cup of Austria
7	Anastasia Skoptsova / Kirill Aleshin	Russia	78.39	2021 Denis Ten Memorial Challenge
8	Laurence Fournier Beaudry / Nikolaj Sørensen	Canada	77.38	2021 Cup of Austria
9	Elizaveta Khudaiberdieva / Egor Bazin	Russia	77.08	2021 Denis Ten Memorial Challenge
10	Kana Muramoto / Daisuke Takahashi	Japan	75.87	2021 Warsaw Cup

Top 10 best scores in the free dance
No.	Team	Nation	Score	Event
1	Gabriella Papadakis / Guillaume Cizeron	France	131.96	2021 Finlandia Trophy
2	Charlène Guignard / Marco Fabbri	Italy	126.10	2021 Cup of Austria
3	Piper Gilles / Paul Poirier	Canada	125.62	2021 Autumn Classic International
4	Madison Chock / Evan Bates	United States	124.59	2021 Finlandia Trophy
5	Diana Davis / Gleb Smolkin	Russia	118.60	2021 Warsaw Cup
6	Laurence Fournier Beaudry / Nikolaj Sørensen	Canada	117.29	2021 Cup of Austria
7	Kaitlin Hawayek / Jean-Luc Baker	United States	116.72	2021 Golden Spin of Zagreb
8	Anastasia Skoptsova / Kirill Aleshin	Russia	116.67	2021 Denis Ten Memorial Challenge
9	Olivia Smart / Adrián Díaz	Spain	116.11	2021 Autumn Classic International
10	Lilah Fear / Lewis Gibson	Great Britain	115.61	2021 Finlandia Trophy
