= 2020 German Figure Skating Championships =

- Type: National Championship
- Date: January 01–03, 2020 (S/J/N); December 13–15, 2019 (J/N)
- Season: 2019–20
- Location: Oberstdorf (S/J/N); Mannheim (J/N)
- Venue: Eissportzentrum Oberstdorf (S/J/N); Eissportzentrum Herzogenried (J/N)

Champions
- Men's singles: Paul Fentz (S); Denis Gurdzhi (J)
- Women's singles: Nicole Schott (S); Nargiz Süleymanova (J)
- Pairs: Minerva Fabienne Hase / Nolan Seegert (S); Letizia Roscher / Luis Schuster (J)
- Ice dance: Katharina Müller / Tim Dieck (S); Lara Luft / Stephano Schuster (J)
- Previous: 2019 German Championships
- Next: 2021 German Championships

The 2020 German Figure Skating Championships (German: Deutsche Meisterschaften im Eiskunstlaufen 2020) were held on January 1–3, 2020 at the Eissportzentrum Oberstdorf in Oberstdorf. Skaters competed in the disciplines of men's and women's singles at the senior level and pair skating and ice dance at the senior, junior, and novice levels.

Single skating competitions at the junior and novice levels were held on December 13–15, 2019, at the Eissportzentrum Herzogenried in Mannheim.

The results of the national championships were among the criteria used to choose the German teams for the 2020 European Championships, 2020 Winter Youth Olympics, 2020 World Championships, and 2020 Junior World Championships.

== Medalists ==
Senior
Discipline	Gold	Silver	Bronze
Men	Paul Fentz	Jonathan Hess	Thomas Stoll
Ladies	Nicole Schott	Aya Hatakawa	Kristina Isaev
Pairs	Minerva Fabienne Hase / Nolan Seegert	Annika Hocke / Robert Kunkel	No other competitors
Ice dance	Katharina Müller / Tim Dieck	Jennifer Janse van Rensburg / Benjamin Steffan	Shari Koch / Christian Nüchtern
Junior
Discipline	Gold	Silver	Bronze
Men	Denis Gurdzhi	Nikita Starostin	Louis Weissert
Ladies	Nargiz Süleymanova	Aya Hatakawa	Anastasia Steblyanka
Pairs	Letizia Roscher / Luis Schuster	Josephine Lossius / Niclas Rust	No other competitors
Ice dance	Lara Luft / Stephano Schuster	Anne-Marie Wolf / Max Liebers	Viktoriia Lopusova / Asaf Kazimov

== Senior results ==
=== Men's singles ===
Rank	Name	Total points	SP		FS	
1	Paul Fentz	227.76	2	71.03	1	156.73
2	Jonathan Hess	186.86	3	70.28	3	116.58
3	Thomas Stoll	182.94	1	75.79	5	107.15
4	Kai Jagoda	176.81	5	59.98	2	116.83
5	Denis Gurdzhi	171.75	6	57.66	4	114.09
6	Catalin Dimitrescu	170.82	4	65.13	6	105.69
7	Fabian Piontek	139.64	7	52.82	7	86.82

=== Women's singles ===
Rank	Name	Total points	SP		FS	
1	Nicole Schott	194.60	1	67.31	1	127.29
2	Aya Hatakawa	154.54	2	58.01	3	96.53
3	Kristina Isaev	149.61	5	48.98	2	100.63
4	Tina Helleken	147.26	3	55.31	4	91.95
5	Lutricia Bock	143.79	4	52.49	5	91.3
6	Elodie Eudine	113.95	6	40.04	6	73.91
7	Jennifer Fischer	108.01	7	39.4	7	68.61
8	Antonia Moarcas	98.43	8	33.03	8	65.4

=== Pairs ===
Rank	Name	Total points	SP		FS	
1	Minerva Fabienne Hase / Nolan Seegert	191.91	1	67.49	1	124.42
2	Annika Hocke / Robert Kunkel	176.7	2	63.52	2	113.18

=== Ice dance ===
Rank	Name	Total points	RD		FD	
1	Katharina Müller / Tim Dieck	192.96	1	76.57	2	116.39
2	Jennifer Janse van Rensburg / Benjamin Steffan	189.21	2	72.65	1	116.56
3	Shari Koch / Christian Nüchtern	178.34	3	70.23	3	108.11
4	Amanda Peterson / Maximilian Pfisterer	140.45	4	55.64	4	84.81

== Junior results ==
=== Men's singles ===
Rank	Name	Total points	SP		FS	
1	Denis Gurdzhi	172.48	1	65.15	1	107.33
2	Nikita Starostin	157.86	2	58.73	2	99.13
3	Louis Weissert	152.19	3	57.89	4	94.30
4	Linus Mager	141.69	7	45.08	3	96.61
5	Florian Paschke	134.38	4	54.84	7	79.54
6	Maxim Knorr	130.69	5	45.94	5	84.75
7	Alessio Medini	128.84	6	45.09	6	83.75
8	Nikos Martick	121.98	8	44.85	8	77.13
9	Robert Löwenherz	115.34	9	39.32	9	76.02
10	Ron Scherhaufer	105.51	10	37.96	10	67.55

=== Women's singles ===
Rank	Name	Total points	SP		FS	
1	Nargiz Süleymanova	152.58	1	56.54	1	96.04
2	Aya Hatakawa	141.62	3	48.21	2	93.41
3	Anastasia Steblyanka	137.45	2	53.07	3	84.38
4	Janne Salatzki	127.5	5	44.27	4	83.23
5	Carmen Wolf	116.89	4	47.03	8	69.86
6	Adelina Merkel	110.06	10	38.78	7	71.28
7	Lilly Luna Schlüter	109.98	12	38.06	5	71.92
8	Cecile Pauline Pfister	108.29	16	36.88	6	71.41
9	Katja Fink	106.17	8	39.22	10	66.95
10	Elodie Eudine	103.98	13	38.05	11	65.93
11	Michelle Minor	102.98	14	37.85	13	65.13
12	Nathalie Grund	102.83	6	40.02	15	62.81
13	Dora Hus	102.43	23	35.25	9	67.18
14	Lara Messinger	101.88	20	36.42	12	65.46
15	Zoe Trafela	101.68	11	38.75	14	62.93
16	Jana Brunner	101.04	7	39.34	17	61.7
17	Elisabeth Jäger	98.57	15	36.99	19	61.58
18	Maike Pruss	97.8	17	36.7	20	61.1
19	Jasmin Wiertz	97.36	22	35.67	18	61.69
20	Kalina Lewicka	97.3	9	38.92	22	58.38
21	Lena-Deborah Dittmann	96.08	19	36.6	21	59.48
22	Katharina Langöhr	95.99	24	33.42	16	62.57
23	Marina Della Rovere	93.12	18	36.63	23	56.49
24	Alexa Nazarko	72.13	25	27.82	24	44.31
WD	Friederike Jüßen	withdrew		35.76	withdrew from competition	
WD	Mariella Lange	withdrew		26.49	withdrew from competition	

=== Pair skating ===
Rank	Name	Total points	SP		FS	
1	Letizia Roscher / Luis Schuster	136.77	1	48.88	1	87.89
2	Josephine Lossius / Nicolas Rust	109.28	2	38.06	2	71.22

=== Ice dance ===
Rank	Name	Total points	RD		FD	
1	Lara Luft / Stephano Schuster	149.72	1	61.18	1	88.54
2	Anne-Marie Wolf / Max Liebers	143.05	2	57.33	2	85.72
3	Viktoriia Lopusova / Asaf Kazimov	126.72	3	50.52	3	76.2
4	Lilia Charlene Schubert / Kieren Wagner	117.91	4	45.85	5	72.06
5	Lea Enderlein / Malte Brandt	116.43	6	43.36	4	73.07
6	Diana Kist / Sergej Gross	112.09	5	43.56	6	68.53

== International team selections ==
=== Winter Youth Olympics ===
The entries of the German team for the 2020 Winter Youth Olympics were published on 16 December 2019.

	Pairs
1	Letizia Roscher / Luis Schuster

=== European Championships ===
Germany's team for the 2020 European Championships was published on 7 January 2020.

	Men	Ladies	Pairs	Ice dancing
1	Paul Fentz	Nicole Schott	Minerva Fabienne Hase / Nolan Seegert	Katharina Müller / Tim Dieck
2			Annika Hocke / Robert Kunkel	
1st alt.	Catalin Dimitrescu	Kristina Isaev	Elena Pavlova / Ruben Blommaert	Shari Koch / Christian Nüchtern
2nd alt.	Jonathan Hess			Jennifer Janse van Rensburg / Benjamin Steffan

=== World Championships ===
Russia's team to the 2020 World Championships was published on 18 February 2020.

	Men	Ladies	Pairs	Ice dancing
1	Paul Fentz	Nicole Schott	Minerva Fabienne Hase / Nolan Seegert	Katharina Müller / Tim Dieck
2			Annika Hocke / Robert Kunkel	
Alt.			Elena Pavlova / Ruben Blommaert	Jennifer Janse van Rensburg / Benjamin Steffan

=== World Junior Championships ===
Germany's team for the 2020 World Junior Championships was published on 10 February 2020.

	Men	Ladies	Pairs	Ice dancing
1	Denis Gurdzhi	Nargiz Süleymanova	Annika Hocke / Robert Kunkel	Lara Luft / Stephano Schuster
Alt.	Nikita Starostin	Aya Hatakawa	Letizia Roscher / Luis Schuster	Anne-Marie Wolf / Max Liebers
