= Nargiz Süleymanova =

German-Azerbaijani figure skater (born 2004)

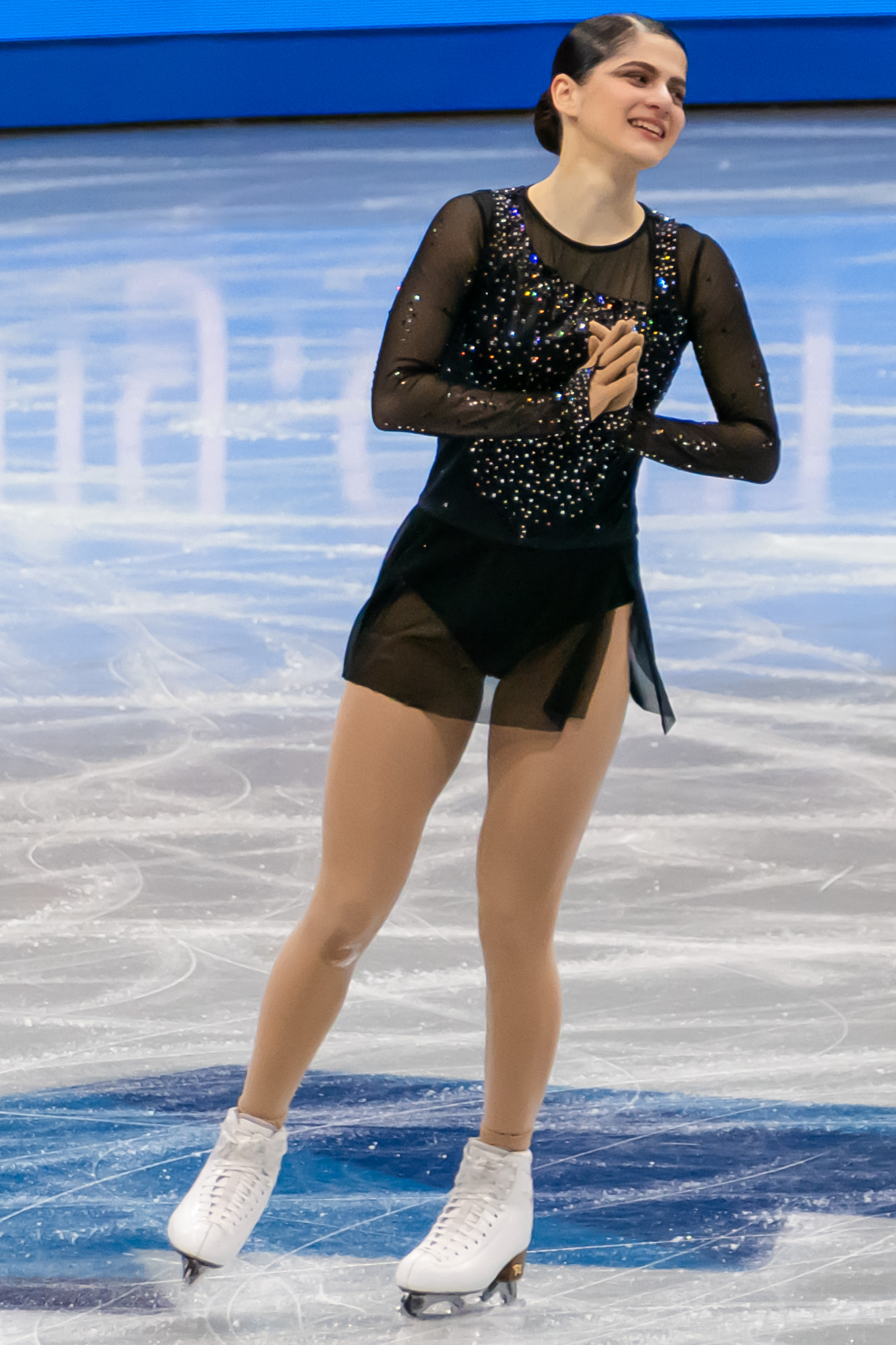
- Süleymanova at the 2025 World Championships

Personal information
- Native name: Nərgiz Süleymanova (Azerbaijani)
- Other names: Sueleymanova; Suleimanova
- Born: 6 September 2004 (age 22) Mühlhausen, Germany
- Home town: Cologne, Germany
- Height: 1.59 m (5 ft 2 1/2 in)

Figure skating career
- Country: Azerbaijan (2024–present); Germany (2010–2021)
- Discipline: Women's singles
- Coach: Joey Russell; Tracy Wilson; Brian Orser; Ernest Pryhitka; Galina Zubkova
- Skating club: Toronto Cricket, Skating and Curling Club
- Began skating: 2010

Nargiz Süleymanova (born 6 September 2004) is a German-Azerbaijani figure skater. Competing for Azerbaijan, she is the 2025 Bosphorus Cup champion and the 2026 Merano Ice Trophy silver medalist.

Süleymanova represented Germany until 2021 and is the 2020 German junior national champion.

== Personal life ==
Süleymanova was born on 6 September 2004 in Mühlhausen, Germany. Her family is from Azerbaijan. Süleymanova was raised in Cologne. She was inspired by Katarina Witt as a child.

Süleymanova is a Lady Gaga fan. She has been involved in the creative process of choreographing her programs.

== Career ==
=== Early career ===
Süleymanova began skating in 2010 at six years old after watching figure skating competitions on televisions with her mother. Her first coach was Galina Zubkova.

=== For Germany ===
==== 2019–20 season ====
Süleymanova debuted as a junior internationally at the NRW Trophy where she won bronze. Having won the silver medal in the novice division at the Coupe du Printemps the prior season, she was named to her first Junior Grand Prix event, the 2019 JGP France in August of that year. Süleymanova placed twenty-fourth at the event. She then placed fourth at the Denis Ten Memorial Challenge before winning bronze at her next event, Golden Bear.

In December 2019, Süleymanova won the 2020 German Junior Championships, qualifying her a spot to the 2020 World Junior Championships. She finished nineteenth at the World Junior Championships.

==== 2020–21 season ====
Due to the COVID-19 pandemic, the 2020–21 ISU Junior Grand Prix was cancelled. Süleymanova competed twice internationally, finishing fourth at the Volvo Open Cup and then withdrawing from the NRW Trophy after finishing seventh in the short program. At the 2021 German Championships, she competed at the senior level. Süleymanova was fifth of five skaters in the short program and subsequently withdrew from the free skate.

==== 2021–22 season ====
Süleymanova placed eighth at 2021 JGP France and sixteenth at 2021 JGP Slovakia to start the season. She competed internationally at the senior level for the first time at 2021 CS Lombardia Trophy, placing twenty-first in the short program before withdrawing. Süleymanova then finished sixth at 2021 CS Denis Ten Memorial Challenge and 10th at the NRW Trophy.

=== For Azerbaijan ===
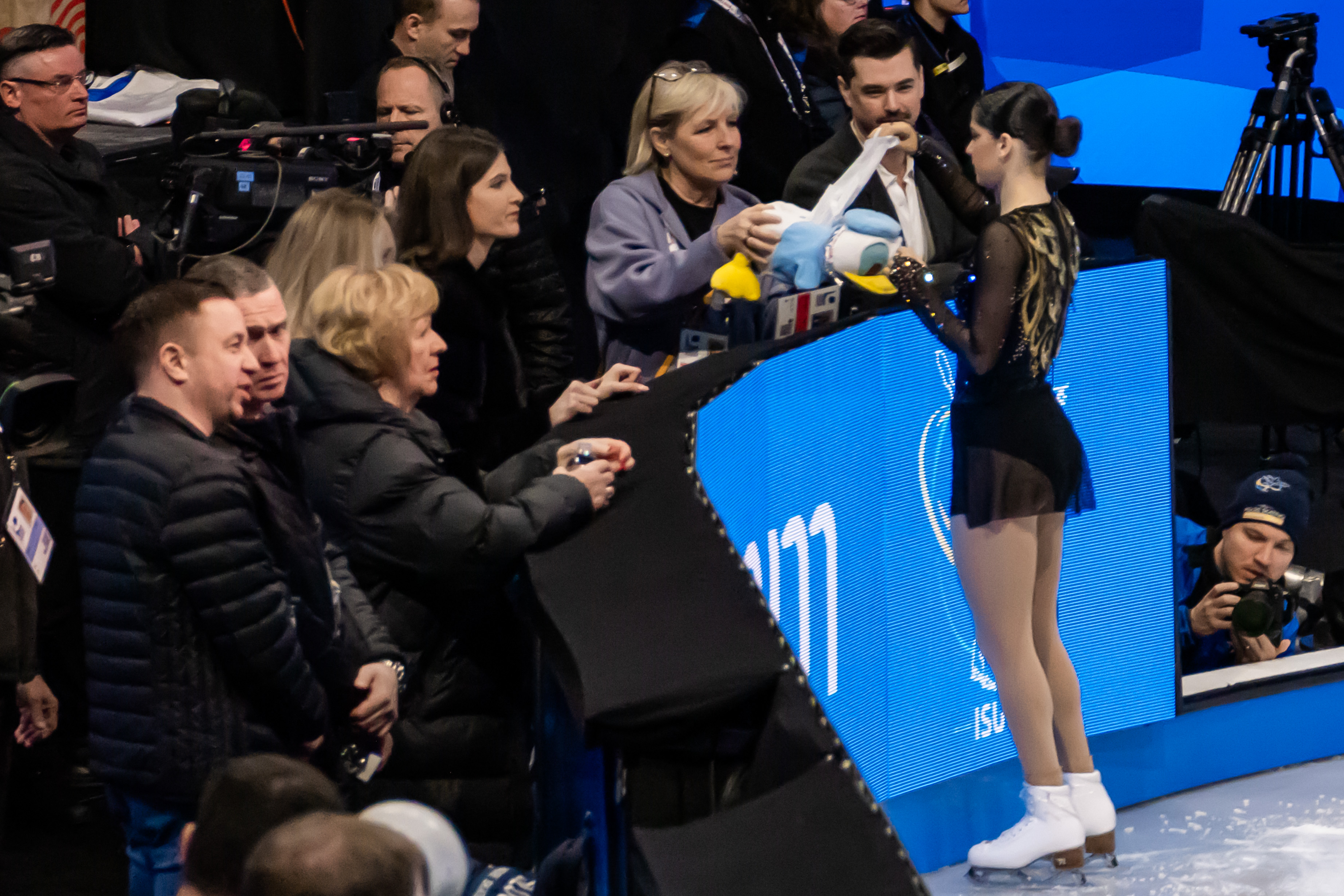
Süleymanova with coaches Tracy Wilson (third from right) and Joey Russell (second from right) at the 2025 World Championships

After 2021, Süleymanova took a three-year break as she wished to switch her nationality which, under International Skating Union rules, required refraining from two years of competition. She had a longtime desire to represent her parents' native country Azerbaijan, expressing her "deep love for her homeland". Süleymanova did not skate at all for two years to focus on her education, graduating from gymnasium during her break with high marks.

As part of her return to skating, Süleymanova attended a camp in Luxembourg where she met Canadian coach and choreographer Joey Russell. With the support of the Azerbaijan Winter Sports Federation, she relocated to Toronto, Canada to train with Russell, Tracy Wilson, and Brian Orser at the Toronto Cricket, Skating and Curling Club.

==== 2024–25 season ====
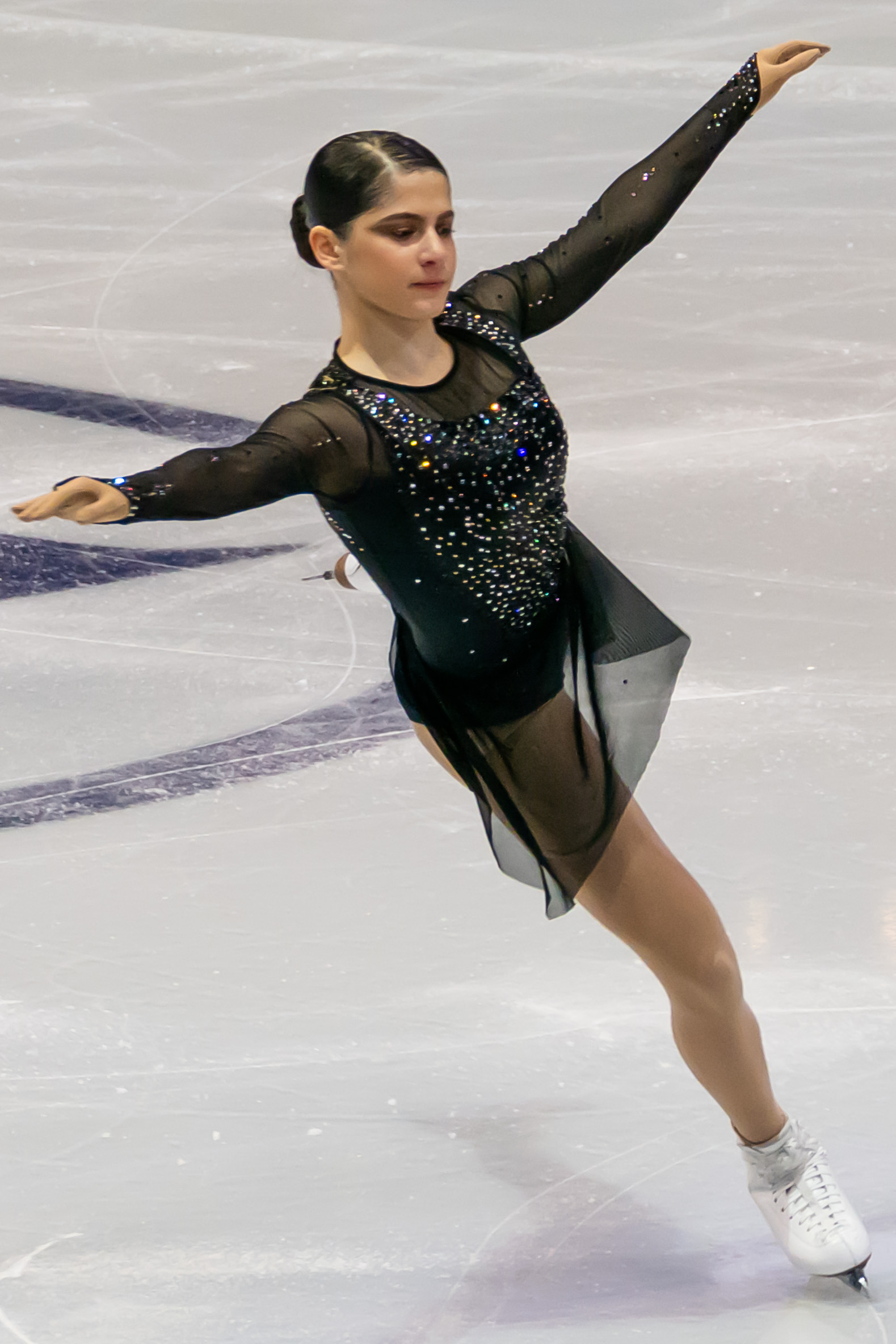
Süleymanova at the 2025 World Championships

Süleymanova returned to competition at the 2024 CS Warsaw Cup where she finished 16th. While she felt nerves due to her first time representing the Azerbaijani national team, she said: "Of course, it was a bit difficult to step back onto the ice after such a long break. But now, I’m training with even more enthusiasm because I’m representing my homeland, Azerbaijan." Süleymanova also placed sixteenth at the 2024 CS Golden Spin of Zagreb.

In January 2025, Süleymanova placed fifth at the Sofia Trophy and also earned her minimums to compete at the 2025 World Championships in Boston, the main goal of her competing. After the Sofia Trophy, Gunay Badalova, the General Secretary of the Azerbaijan Winter Sports Federation, noted that Süleymanova had impressed in recent competitions and that she hoped Süleymanova "will represent our country with dignity in Boston as well". As preparation ahead of World Championships, Süleymanova then placed eighth at the Bavarian Open and tenth at the Sonja Henie Trophy.

At the 2025 World Championships, Süleymanova was twenty-fifth in the short program and narrowly missed qualifying to the free skating, finishing only 0.01 points behind Lithuania's Meda Variakojytė. As a result, she did not qualify a quota for Azerbaijan at the 2026 Winter Olympics. Her coach, Joey Russell, described the situation as "incredibly difficult to process", but emphasized Süleymanova's very recent return to the sport at the time.

==== 2025–26 season ====
Süleymanova opened the season at Skate to Milano in September, the final qualification event for the 2026 Winter Olympics. She finished twelfth and did not earn a quota for Azerbaijan.

Süleymanova placed fourteenth at the 2025 CS Trialeti Trophy and fourth at Ice Challenge. She then won her first international title at the Bosphorus Cup despite a mistake on her triple-triple combination in the short program, an element she had only recently added into her program. Süleymanova's result also qualified her for the 2025 European Championships. In December, she finished seventeenth at the 2025 CS Golden Spin of Zagreb.

At the 2025 European Championships, Süleymanova became the first ethnic Azerbaijani to represent the country at the European Championships as all prior representatives had been foreign-born athletes. She finished thirtieth in the short program and did not advance to the free skating. Süleymanova rebounded at the 2026 Merano Ice Trophy, where she won the silver medal behind Marina Piredda of Italy. She then finished sixth at the EDGE Cup.

At the 2026 World Championships, Süleymanova finished twenty-seventh after the short program, unable to advance to the free skate.

== Programs ==
Competition programs by season
Season	Short program	Free skate program
2019–20	Medley: 1. Pictures at an Exhibition; Composed by Modest Mussorgsky; 2. Hymn to the Rising Sun; Composed by Patrik Almkvisth; Choreo. by Galina Zubkova	Medley: 1. Romance; From A Bittersweet Life; Composed by Yuhki Kuramoto; 2. Palladio; Composed by Karl Jenkins; Performed by Escala; Choreo. by Galina Zubkova
2020–21	Angelica: From Pirates of the Caribbean: On Stranger Tides; Composed by Hans Zimmer; Performed by Rodrigo y Gabriela; Choreo. by Lorenzo Magri	Bang Bang (My Baby Shot Me Down): Performed by Tony Bennett, Lady Gaga; Choreo. by Adam Solya
2021–22	Anytime, Anywhere: Performed by Sarah Brightman; Choreo. by Adam Solya	Bang Bang (My Baby Shot Me Down)
2024–25	The Hanging Tree: From The Hunger Games: Mockingjay – Part 1; Composed by James Newton Howard; Choreo. by Joey Russell	Dracula, the Musical: Composed by Frank Wildhorn, Don Black, Christopher Hampton; Choreo. by Joey Russell
2025–26	Shallow: From A Star Is Born; Performed by Lady Gaga; Choreo. by Joey Russell	Dracula, the Musical

== Competitive highlights ==
- JGP – ISU Junior Grand Prix Series
- CS – ISU Challenger Series
- TBD – To be decided
- WD – Withdrew
- C – Event cancelled

=== For Azerbaijan ===
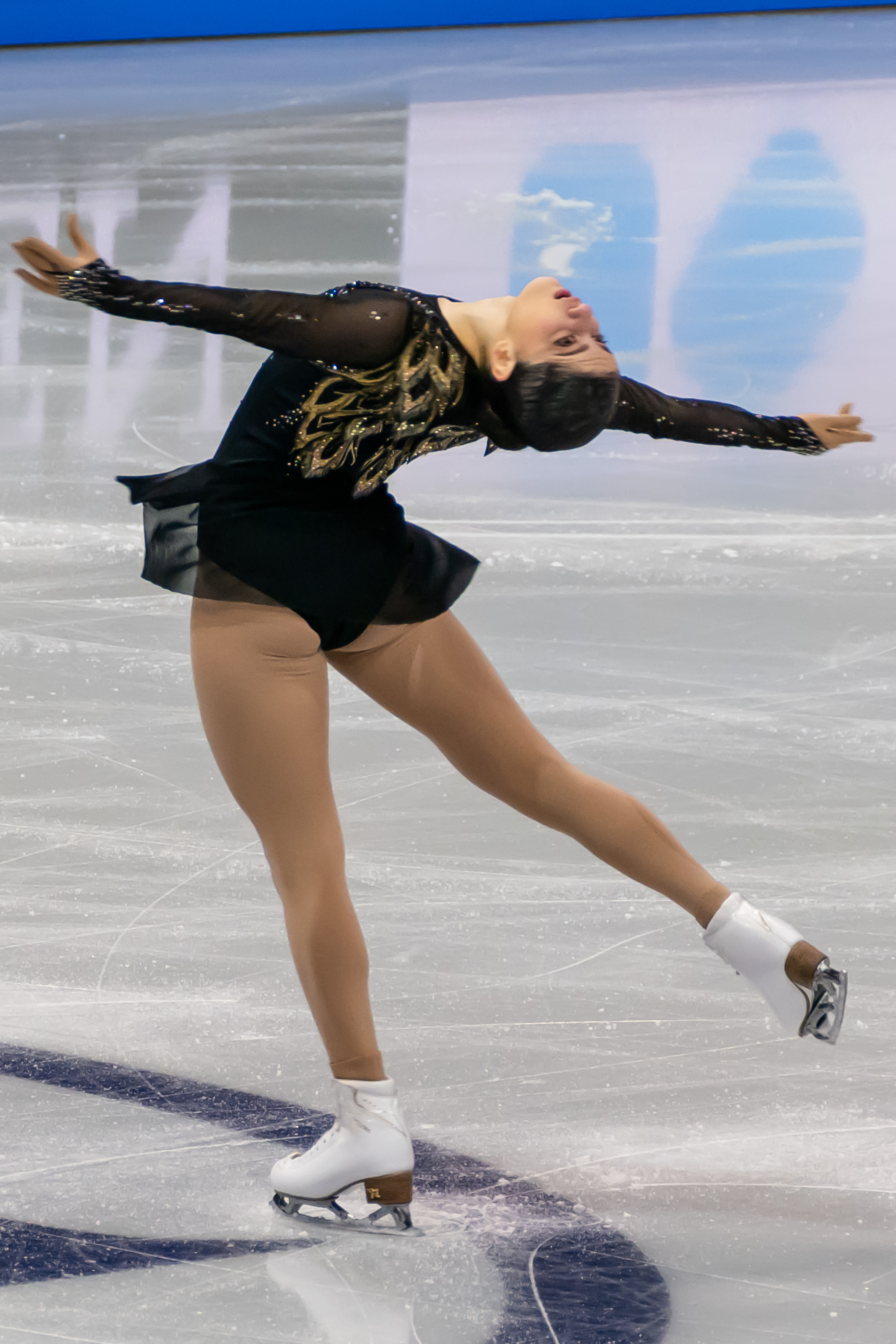
Süleymanova at the 2025 World Figure Skating Championships

Competition placements at senior level
Season	2024–25	2025–26	2026–27
World Championships	25th	27th	
European Championships		30th	
CS Golden Spin	16th	17th	
CS Nepela Memorial			WD
CS Trialeti Trophy		14th	
CS Warsaw Cup	16th		
Bosphorus Cup		1st	
EDGE Cup		6th	
Ice Challenge		4th	
Merano Ice Trophy		2nd	
Skate to Milano		12th	
Sofia Trophy	5th		
Sonja Henie Trophy	10th		
Bavarian Open	8th		

=== For Germany ===
Competition placements at senior level
Season	2020–21	2021–22
CS Denis Ten Memorial		6th
CS Lombardia Trophy		WD
German Championships	WD	
NRW Trophy		10th

Competition placements at junior level
Season	2019–20	2020–21	2021–22
World Junior Championships	19th		
JGP France	24th		8th
JGP Slovakia			16th
German Championships	1st		
Bavarian Open	6th		
Denis Ten Memorial	4th		
Golden Bear	3rd		
NRW Trophy	3rd	WD	
Volvo Open Cup	7th	4th	

== Detailed results ==
ISU personal best scores in the +5/-5 GOE System
Segment	Type	Score	Event
Total	TSS	150.22	2025 Trialeti Trophy
Short program	TSS	56.07	2025 Golden Spin
Short program	TES	32.32	2025 Golden Spin
Short program	PCS	24.60	2021 Denis Ten Memorial
Free skating	TSS	103.01	2025 Trialeti Trophy
Free skating	TES	54.75	2025 Trialeti Trophy
Free skating	PCS	49.26	2025 Trialeti Trophy

=== For Azerbaijan ===
Results in the 2024–25 season
Date	Event	SP		FS		Total	
Date	Event	P	Score	P	Score	P	Score
20–24 Nov 2024	(Poland) 2024 CS Warsaw Cup	18	46.03	16	89.12	16	135.15
4–7 Dec 2024	(Croatia) 2024 CS Golden Spin of Zagreb	16	44.34	17	93.06	16	137.40
9–11 Jan 2025	(Bulgaria) 2025 Sofia Trophy	5	56.71	3	116.09	5	172.80
20–26 Jan 2025	(Germany) 2025 Bavarian Open	12	43.31	7	95.70	8	139.01
6–9 Mar 2025	(Norway) 2025 Sonja Henie Trophy	7	47.27	10	84.54	10	131.81
24–30 Mar 2025	(United States) 2025 World Championships	25	50.97	—N/a	—N/a	25	50.97

Results in the 2025–26 season
Date	Event	SP		FS		Total	
Date	Event	P	Score	P	Score	P	Score
18–21 Sep 2025	(China) 2025 Skate to Milano	13	50.47	15	92.08	12	142.55
8–11 Oct 2025	(Georgia (country)) 2025 CS Trialeti Trophy	19	47.21	13	103.01	14	150.22
5–9 Nov 2025	(Austria) 2025 Ice Challenge	4	48.66	4	91.55	4	140.21
24–30 Nov 2025	(Turkey) 2025 Bosphorus Cup	3	53.56	1	102.97	1	156.53
3–6 Dec 2025	(Croatia) 2025 CS Golden Spin of Zagreb	8	56.07	20	82.89	17	138.96
13–18 Jan 2026	(United Kingdom) 2026 European Championships	30	46.60	—N/a	—N/a	30	46.60
22–25 Jan 2026	(Italy) 2026 Merano Ice Trophy	3	60.42	3	105.97	2	166.39
27 Jan – 1 Feb 2026	(Poland) 2026 EDGE Cup	5	47.23	6	81.04	6	128.27
24–29 Mar 2026	(Czech Republic) 2026 World Championships	27	49.00	—N/a	—N/a	27	49.00

=== For Germany ===
==== Senior level ====
Results in the 2020–21 season
Date	Event	SP		FS		Total	
Date	Event	P	Score	P	Score	P	Score
18–19 Dec 2020	(Germany) 2021 German Championships	5	35.89	—N/a	—N/a	WD	—N/a

Results in the 2021–22 season
Date	Event	SP		FS		Total	
Date	Event	P	Score	P	Score	P	Score
10–12 Sep 2021	(Italy) 2021 CS Lombardia Trophy	21	47.19	—N/a	—N/a	WD	—N/a
27–31 Oct 2021	(Kazakhstan) 2021 CS Denis Ten Memorial Challenge	6	49.98	7	87.01	6	136.99
4–7 Nov 2021	(Germany) 2021 NRW Trophy	11	43.06	10	72.98	10	116.04

==== Junior level ====
Results in the 2019–20 season
Date	Event	SP		FS		Total	
Date	Event	P	Score	P	Score	P	Score
9–11 Aug 2019	(Germany) 2019 NRW Trophy	1	49.61	5	78.62	3	128.23
21–24 Aug 2019	2019 JGP France	25	40.68	21	80.66	24	121.34
9–12 Oct 2019	(Kazakhstan) 2019 Denis Ten Memorial Challenge	4	54.11	4	84.43	4	138.54
24–27 Oct 2019	(Croatia) 2019 Golden Bear	1	55.60	5	90.91	3	146.51
5–10 Nov 2019	(Latvia) 2019 Volvo Open Cup	2	57.80	10	90.08	7	147.88
1–3 Jan 2020	(Germany) 2020 German Championships	1	56.54	1	96.04	1	152.58
3–9 Feb 2020	(Germany) 2020 Bavarian Open	3	56.25	6	93.06	6	149.31
2–8 Mar 2020	(Estonia) 2020 World Junior Championships	21	51.07	19	94.96	19	146.03

Results in the 2020–21 season
Date	Event	SP		FS		Total	
Date	Event	P	Score	P	Score	P	Score
7–8 Nov 2020	(Latvia) 2020 Volvo Open Cup	4	44.29	4	66.37	4	110.66
26–29 Nov 2020	(Germany) 2020 NRW Trophy	9	43.14	—N/a	—N/a	WD	—N/a

Results in the 2021–22 season
Date	Event	SP		FS		Total	
Date	Event	P	Score	P	Score	P	Score
18–21 Aug 2021	2021 JGP France I	8	51.53	8	87.21	8	138.74
1–4 Sep 2021	2021 JGP Slovakia	12	45.84	18	75.78	16	121.62
