= NRW Trophy =

International figure skating competition

- Location: Germany

The NRW Trophy (also known as the NRW Summer Trophy or the NRW Autumn Trophy) is an annual international figure skating competition organized by the Skating Union of North Rhine-Westphalia. Since 2007, it has been sanctioned by the Deutsche Eislauf Union and the International Skating Union. It is held every autumn at the Westfalenhallen in Dortmund, Germany. Medals may be awarded in men's singles, women's singles, pair skating, and ice dance. The competition is held in two parts: The Ice Dance Trophy is held in early November, while the Figure Skating Trophy is held for singles and pair skating in late November or early December.

== Medalists ==
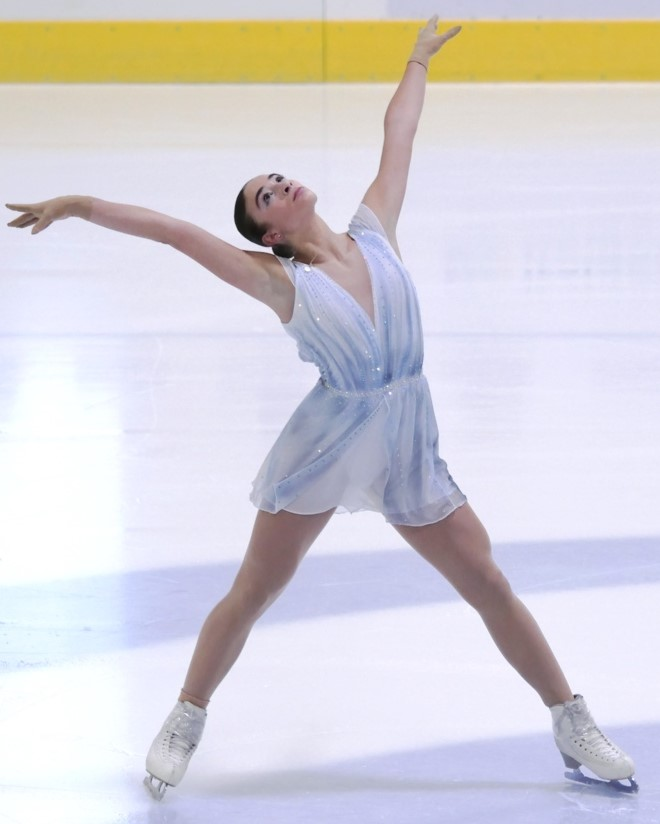
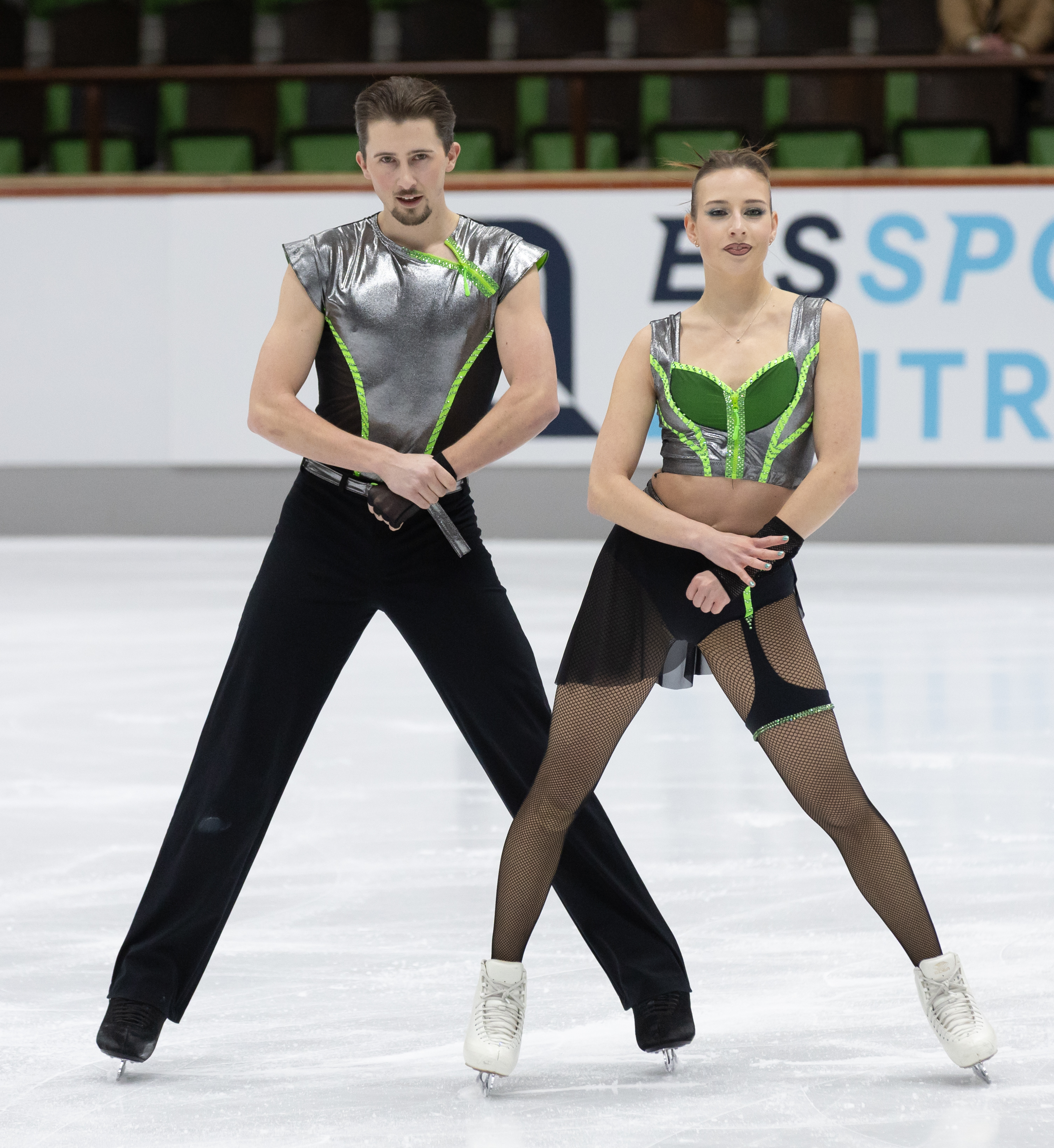
The reigning NRW Trophy champions (from left to right): Anna Pezzetta of Italy (women's singles); and Charise Matthaei and Max Liebers of Germany (ice dance)
Not pictured: Lukáš Václavík of Slovakia (men's singles)

== Senior results ==
=== Men's singles ===
Year	Gold	Silver	Bronze	Ref.
2007	(Russia) Konstantin Menshov	(Russia) Ivan Tretiakov	(Austria) Christian Rauchbauer	
2008	(Belgium) Kevin van der Perren	(Italy) Samuel Contesti	(Spain) Javier Fernández	
2009	(France) Yannick Ponsero	(Italy) Samuel Contesti	(Belgium) Kevin van der Perren	
2010	(Sweden) Alexander Majorov	(Russia) Ivan Tretiakov	(Czech Republic) Pavel Kaška	
2011	(Italy) Samuel Contesti	(Germany) Peter Liebers	(Japan) Kento Nakamura	
2012	(Russia) Konstantin Menshov	(Czech Republic) Michal Březina	(Germany) Peter Liebers	
2013	(Sweden) Alexander Majorov	(France) Brian Joubert	(Belgium) Jorik Hendrickx	
2014	(Germany) Franz Streubel	(Ukraine) Ivan Pavlov	(France) Adrien Tesson	
2015	(Belgium) Jorik Hendrickx	(Kazakhstan) Denis Ten	(Russia) Sergei Voronov	
2016	(Sweden) Alexander Majorov	(Germany) Paul Fentz	(France) Romain Ponsart	
2020	(Croatia) Jari Kessler	(Germany) Paul Fentz	(Switzerland) Lukas Britschgi	
2021	(Switzerland) Lukas Britschgi	(Sweden) Nikolaj Majorov	(Germany) Nikita Starostin	
2022	(Germany) Nikita Starostin	(Germany) Kai Jagoda	(Sweden) Oliver Praetorius	
2023	(Spain) Tomàs-Llorenç Guarino Sabaté	(Mexico) Donovan Carrillo	(Croatia) Jari Kessler	
2024	(Israel) Lev Vinokur	(Mexico) Donovan Carrillo	(Switzerland) Noah Bodenstein	
2025	(France) Samy Hammi	(Spain) Tomàs-Llorenç Guarino Sabaté	(Germany) Nikita Starostin	
2026	(Slovakia) Lukáš Václavík	(France) Samy Hammi	(Germany) Nikita Starostin	

=== Women's singles ===
Year	Gold	Silver	Bronze	Ref.
2007	(Germany) Katharina Gierok	(Germany) Mira Sonnenberg	(Bulgaria) Hristina Vassileva	
2008	(Georgia (country)) Elena Gedevanishvili	(Italy) Francesca Rio	(Germany) Constanze Paulinus	
2009	(Italy) Valentina Marchei	(Russia) Katarina Gerboldt	(United Kingdom) Jenna McCorkell	
2010	(Japan) Shoko Ishikawa	(Germany) Sarah Hecken	(France) Yrétha Silété	
2011	(Sweden) Viktoria Helgesson	(Japan) Yuki Nishino	(Japan) Kako Tomotaki	
2012	(South Korea) Kim Yuna	(Russia) Ksenia Makarova	(Sweden) Viktoria Helgesson	
2013	(Estonia) Jelena Glebova	(Russia) Polina Agafonova	(Slovakia) Nicole Rajičová	
2014	(Germany) Nicole Schott	(Luxembourg) Fleur Maxwell	(Austria) Kerstin Frank	
2015	(France) Laurine Lecavelier	(Czech Republic) Elizaveta Ukolova	(Czech Republic) Anna Dušková	
2016	(Germany) Nicole Schott	(Belgium) Loena Hendrickx	(Germany) Nathalie Weinzierl	
2020	(Netherlands) Lindsay van Zundert	(Sweden) Josefin Taljegård	(Finland) Jenni Saarinen	
2021	(Netherlands) Lindsay van Zundert	(France) Léa Serna	(Sweden) Josefin Taljegård	
2022	(Belgium) Jade Hovine	(Austria) Stefanie Pesendorfer	(Germany) Kristina Isaev	
2023	(Mexico) Andrea Montesinos Cantú	(Sweden) Nina Fredriksson	(Sweden) Lovissa Aav	
2024	(Israel) Mariia Seniuk	(Netherlands) Niki Wories	(Germany) Anna Grekul	
2025	(Netherlands) Niki Wories	(Czech Republic) Eliška Březinová	(United Kingdom) Nina Povey	
2026	(Italy) Anna Pezzetta	(Switzerland) Eugenia Sekulovski	(United States) Alex Evans	

=== Pairs ===
Year	Gold	Silver	Bronze	Ref.
2008	(Italy); Nicole Della Monica; Yannick Kocon	(Germany); Mari Vartmann; Florian Just	(Israel); Ekaterina Sokolova; Fedor Sokolov	
2009	(Italy); Nicole Della Monica; Yannick Kocon	(Italy); Stefania Berton; Ondřej Hotárek	(Germany); Mari Vartmann; Florian Just	
2010	(Italy); Stefania Berton; Ondřej Hotárek	(Germany); Katharina Gierok; Florian Just	(France); Adeline Canac; Yannick Bonheur	
2011	(Germany); Mari Vartmann; Aaron Van Cleave	(Belarus); Lubov Bakirova; Mikalai Kamianchuk	(Estonia); Natalya Zabiyako; Sergei Kulbach	
2012	(Germany); Aliona Savchenko; Robin Szolkowy	(Italy); Stefania Berton; Ondřej Hotárek	(France); Vanessa James; Morgan Ciprès	
2013	(Russia); Vera Bazarova; Yuri Larionov	(Germany); Maylin Wende; Daniel Wende	(Germany); Mari Vartmann; Aaron Van Cleave	
2014	(Hong Kong); Marin Ono; Hon Lam To	(Switzerland); Alexandra Herbríková; Nicolas Roulet	(Germany); Minerva Fabienne Hase; Nolan Seegert	
2015	(Germany); Minerva Hase; Nolan Seegert	No other competitors		
2016	(Germany); Minerva Hase; Nolan Seegert	(France); Lola Esbrat; Andrei Novoselov	(Switzerland); Ioulia Chtchetinina; Noah Scherer	
2020	(Germany); Annika Hocke; Robert Kunkel	(Germany); Minerva Fabienne Hase; Nolan Seegert	(Netherlands); Daria Danilova; Michel Tsiba	
2021	(Netherlands); Daria Danilova; Michel Tsiba	(Netherlands); Nika Osipova; Dmitry Epstein	No other competitors	
2024	(Switzerland); Oxana Vouillamoz; Tom Bouvart	(Sweden); Greta Crafoord; John Crafoord	(Iceland); Júlía Sylvía Gunnarsdóttir; Manuel Piazza	

=== Ice dance ===
Year	Gold	Silver	Bronze	Ref.
2007	(Czech Republic); Kamila Hájková; David Vincour	(Switzerland); Leonie Krail; Oscar Peter	(Australia); Maria Borounov; Evgeni Borounov	
2008	(Russia); Anastasia Platonova; Alexander Grachev	(Germany); Carolina Hermann; Daniel Hermann	(Poland); Joanna Budner; Jan Mościcki	
2009	(France); Pernelle Carron; Lloyd Jones	(Germany); Carolina Hermann; Daniel Hermann	(United Kingdom); Christina Chitwood; Mark Hanretty	
2010	(France); Pernelle Carron; Lloyd Jones	(Germany); Nelli Zhiganshina; Alexander Gazsi	(Lithuania); Isabella Tobias; Deividas Stagniūnas	
2011	(Germany); Tanja Kolbe; Stefano Caruso	(Italy); Charlene Guignard; Marco Fabbri	(Germany); Carolina Hermann; Daniel Hermann	
2012	(France); Pernelle Carron; Lloyd Jones	(Japan); Cathy Reed; Chris Reed	(Russia); Valeria Starygina; Ivan Volobuiev	
2013	(Italy); Charlène Guignard; Marco Fabbri	(Turkey); Alisa Agafonova; Alper Uçar	(Canada); Kharis Ralph; Asher Hill	
2014	(United Kingdom); Penny Coomes; Nicholas Buckland	(United Kingdom); Olivia Smart; Joseph Buckland	(Finland); Olesia Karmi; Max Lindholm	
2015	(Turkey); Alisa Agafonova; Alper Uçar	(Austria); Barbora Silná; Juri Kurakin	(Germany); Katharina Müller; Tim Dieck	
2016	(Germany); Katharina Müller; Tim Dieck	(Germany); Kavita Lorenz; Panagiotis Polizoakis	(Italy); Jasmine Tessari; Francesco Fioretti	
2018	(Germany); Katharina Müller; Tim Dieck	(Italy); Jasmine Tessari; Francesco Fioretti	(Germany); Shari Koch; Christian Nüchtern	
2019	(Russia); Ksenia Konkina; Pavel Drozd	(Ukraine); Darya Popova; Volodymyr Byelikov	(Bulgaria); Mina Zdravkova; Christopher M. Davis	
2020	(Germany); Katharina Müller; Tim Dieck	(Switzerland); Fiona Pernas; German Shamraev	(Netherlands); Chelsea Verhaegh; Sherim van Geffen	
2021	(Finland); Yuka Orihara; Juho Pirinen	(France); Natacha Lagouge; Arnaud Caffa	(Switzerland); Jasmine Tessari; Stéphane Walker	
2022	(Georgia (country)); Maria Kazakova; Georgy Reviya	(Poland); Anastasia Polibina; Pavel Golovishnikov	(Germany); Charise Matthaei; Max Liebers	
2023	(Estonia); Solène Mazingue; Marko Jevgeni Gaidajenko	(Italy); Giorgia Galimberti; Matteo-Libasse Mandelli	(Spain); Philomene Sabourin; Raul Bermejo	
2024	(Germany); Charise Matthaei; Max Liebers	(Israel); Elizabeth Tkachenko; alexei Kiliakov	(Israel); Mariia Nosovitskaya; Mikhail Nosovitskiy	
2025	(Germany); Charise Matthaei; Max Liebers	(Italy); Giulia Isabella Paolino; Andrea Tuba	(Hungary); Mariia Ignateva; Danijil Szemko	
2026	(Germany); Charise Matthaei; Max Liebers	(China); Junfei Ren; Jianing Xing	(Italy); Carolina Portesi Peroni; Pietro Papetti	

== Junior results ==
=== Men's singles ===
Year	Gold	Silver	Bronze	Ref.
2007	(Kazakhstan) Denis Ten	(Russia) Gordei Gorshkov	(Russia) Murad Kurbanov	
2008	(Germany) Denis Wieczorek	(Italy) Saverio Giacomelli	(Belgium) Jorik Hendrickx	
2009	(Russia) Artem Grigoriev	(Belgium) Jorik Hendrickx	(Germany) Daniel Dotzauer	
2010	(Germany) Paul Fentz	(Finland) Viktor Zubik	(Finland) Matthias Versluis	
2011	(Germany) Niko Ulanovsky	(Finland) Matthias Versluis	(Italy) Maurizio Zandron	
2012	(Russia) Vladislav Smirnov	(Russia) Feodosiy Efremenkov	(Russia) Moris Kvitelashvili	
2013	(Russia) Roman Savosin	(Russia) Daniil Bernadiner	(Russia) Dmitriy Mikhaylov	
2014	(Sweden) Illya Solomin	(Czech Republic) Matyáš Bělohradský	(Germany) Dave Kötting	
2015	(Russia) Roman Savosin	(Germany) Catalin Dimitrescu	(Germany) Kai Jagoda	
2016	(Russia) Andrei Mozalev	(Russia) Dmitriy Shutkov	(Russia) Ilya Mironov	
2018	(Germany) Nikita Starostin	(Germany) Denis Gurdzhi	(Germany) Jonathan Hess	
2019	(Germany) Denis Gurdzhi	(Kazakhstan) Nikita Manko	(Sweden) Oliver Praetorius	
2020	(Germany) Denis Gurdzhi	(Germany) Louis Weissert	(Germany) Leon Kraiczyk	
2021	(Italy) Matteo Nalbone	(Italy) Raffaele Zich	(Germany) Denis Gurdzhi	
2022	(Germany) Hugo Herrmann	(Germany) Luca Fünfer	(Germany) Tim England	
2023	(Switzerland) Aurélian Chervet	(Sweden) Elias Sayed	(Poland) Jakub Lofek	
2024	(Israel) Tamir Kuperman	(Germany) Genrikh Gartung	(Hungary) Deyan Mihaylov	
2025	(Israel) Nikita Sheiko	(Germany) Michelangelo Caprano	(Israel) Kirill Sheiko	
2026	(Israel) Nikita Sheiko	(United States) Zachary Lopinto	(Israel) Kirill Sheiko	

=== Women's singles ===
Year	Gold	Silver	Bronze	Ref.
2007	(Germany) Isabel Drescher	(Belgium) Barbara Klerk	(Germany) Katja Grohmann	
2008	(Italy) Roberta Rodeghiero	(Germany) Nicole Gurny	(Germany) Isabel Drescher	
2009	(France) Léna Marrocco	(Finland) Timila Shrestha	(Germany) Jessica Füssinger	
2010	(Russia) Alexandra Deeva	(Finland) Timila Shrestha	(Germany) Jessica Füssinger	
2011	(Germany) Angelika Dubinski	(Czech Republic) Elizaveta Ukolova	(Switzerland) Yasmine Kimiko Yamada	
2012	(Czech Republic) Elizaveta Ukolova	(Italy) Guia Tagliapietra	(Italy) Sara Casella	
2013	(Russia) Elizaveta Iushenko	(Russia) Alsu Kaiumova	(Lithuania) Aleksandra Golovkina	
2014	(Kazakhstan) Elizabet Tursynbayeva	(Finland) Anni Järvenpää	(Germany) Lea Johanna Dastich	
2015	(Germany) Annika Hocke	(Germany) Lea Johanna Dastich	(Sweden) Anastasia Schneider	
2016	(Russia) Alexandrina Degtiareva	(Germany) Lea Johanna Dastich	(Italy) Elisabetta Leccardi	
2018	(Bulgaria) Alexandra Feigin	(Lithuania) Paulina Ramanauskaitė	(Germany) Elodie Eudine	
2019	(Germany) Aya Hatakawa	(Israel) Mariia Seniuk	(Germany) Nargiz Süleymanova	
2020	(Switzerland) Kimmy Repond	(Germany) Aya Hatakawa	(Germany) Carmen Wolf	
2021	(Switzerland) Kimmy Repond	(Italy) Anna Pezzetta	(Norway) Linnea Kilsand	
2022	(Finland) Iida Karhunen	(Germany) Olesya Ray	(Czech Republic) Barbora Vránková	
2023	(Italy) Amanda Ghezzo	(Netherlands) Angel Delevaque	(Italy) Giulia Barucchi	
2024	(Georgia (country)) Inga Gurgenidze	(Finland) Venla Sinisalo	(Germany) Anna Gerke	
2025	(Israel) Sophia Shifrin	(Germany) Diana Alexandra Ziesecke	(Germany) Anna Gerke	
2026	(Israel) Sophia Shifrin	(Germany) Diana Alexandra Ziesecke	(United States) Kaya Tiernan	

=== Pairs ===
Year	Gold	Silver	Bronze	Ref.
2008	(Russia); Tatiana Novik; Konstantin Medovikov	(Italy); Carolina Gillespie; Daniel Aggiano	(Netherlands); Marylie Jorg; Ben Koenderink	
2009	(Russia); Irina Moiseeva; Vladimir Morozov	(Germany); Juliana Gurdzhi; Alexander Völler	(Russia); Evgenia Krapivina; Konstantin Medovikov	
2010	(Netherlands); Rachel Epstein; Dmitry Epstein	No other competitors		
2011	(Russia); Lina Fedorova; Maxim Miroshkin	(Russia); Anastasia Dolidze; Vadim Ivanov	(Russia); Maria Deryabina; Vladimir Arkhipov	
2012	(Germany); Annabelle Prolss; Ruben Blommaert	(Russia); Arina Cherniavskaia; Antonio Souza-Kordeyru	(Russia); Anastasia Dolidze; Vadim Ivanov	
2013	(Russia); Arina Cherniavskaia; Antonio Souza-Kordeyru	(Russia); Rinata Murasova; Sergei Alexeev	(Russia); Vlada Mishina; Vadim Ivanov	
2014	(Czech Republic); Anna Dušková; Martin Bidař	(France); Christina Bogdanova; Thomas Rochelet	No other competitors	
2015	(Russia); Alina Ustimkina; Nikita Volodin	(Czech Republic); Anna Dušková; Martin Bidař	(Germany); Minori Yuge; Jannis Bronisefski	
2016	(Germany); Talisa Thomalla; Robert Kunkel	(Italy); Irma Caldara; Edoardo Caputo	No other competitors	
2020	(Germany); Daniela Muntean; Artem Rotar	No other competitors		
2021	(Germany); Josephine Lossius; Artem Rotar	No other competitors		
2024	(France); Louise Ehrhard; Matthis Pellegris	(Switzerland); Zoe Madison Pflaum; Luns Mager	(Switzerland); Chiara Michaela Pazienza; Maxim Knorr	

=== Ice dance ===
Year	Gold	Silver	Bronze	Ref.
2006	(Ukraine); Nadezhda Frolenkova; Mikhail Kasalo	(Germany); Carolina Hermann; Daniel Hermann	(Germany); Saskia Brall; Tim Giesen	
2007	(Ukraine); Anastasia Gavrylovych; Maciej Bernadowski	(Czech Republic); Lucie Myslivečková; Matěj Novák	(Germany); Ashley Foy; Benjamin Blum	
2008	(Russia); Ekaterina Riazanova; Jonathan Guerreiro	(Russia); Victoria Sinitsina; Ruslan Zhiganshin	(Ukraine); Siobhan Heekin-Canedy; Dmitri Zyzak	
2009	(Russia); Ekaterina Pushkash; John Guerreiro	(Russia); Alexandra Stepanova; Ivan Bukin	(Ukraine); Ruslana Yurchenko; Oleksandr Lyubchenko	
2010	(France); Tiffany Zahorski; Alexis Miart	(Russia); Tatiana Baturintseva; Sergey Mozgov	(Russia); Valeria Loseva; Denis Lunin	
2011	(Russia); Ksenia Korobkova; Daniil Gleikhengauz	(Germany); Shari Koch; Christian Nüchtern	(Russia); Valeria Loseva; Denis Lunin	
2012	(Germany); Shari Koch; Christian Nüchtern	(France); Gabriella Papadakis; Guillaume Cizeron	(Italy); Sofia Sforza; Francesco Fioretti	
2013	(South Korea); Rebeka Kim; Kirill Minov	(Russia); Eva Khachaturian; Igor Eremenko	(United Kingdom); Olivia Smart; Joseph Buckland	
2014	(Germany); Katharina Müller; Tim Dieck	(Italy); Sara Ghislandi; Giona Terzo Ortenzi	(Russia); Sofia Polishchuk; Alexander Vakhnov	
2015	(Italy); Sara Ghislandi; Giona Terzo Ortenzi	(Russia); Eva Khachaturian; Andrei Bagin	(Germany); Ria Schwendinger; Valentin Wunderlich	
2016	(Russia); Sofia Shevchenko; Igor Eremenko	(France); Natacha Lagouge; Corentin Rahier	(Germany); Ria Schwendinger; Valentin Wunderlich	
2018	(Ukraine); Darya Popova; Volodymyr Byelikov	(Germany); Lara Luft; Asaf Kazimov	(Russia); Irina Khavronina; Dario Cirisano	
2019	(Georgia (country)); Maria Kazakova; Georgy Reviya	(Russia); Sofia Kachushkina; Egor Goncharov	(Russia); Angelina Zimina; Aleksandr Gnedin	
2020	(Germany); Lea Enderlein; Malte Brandt	(Germany); Anne Marie Wolf; Max Liebers	(Germany); Lilia Schubert; Kiran Wagner	
2021	(Russia); Ekaterina Rybakova; Ivan Makhnonosov	(Italy); Nicole Calderari; Marco Cilli	(Italy); Noemi Tali; Stefano Frasca	
2022	(Germany); Karla Karl; Kai Hoferichter	(Italy); Noemi Tali; Stefano Frasca	(Germany); Darya Grimm; Michail Savitskiy	
2023	(Italy); Noemi Maria Tali; Noah Lafornara	(France); Dania Mouaden; Théo Bigot	(Italy); Beatrice Ventura; Stefano Frasca	
2024	(France); Dania Mouaden; Théo Bigot	(Slovakia); Aneta Vaclavikova; Ivan Morozov	(Germany); Lilia Schubert; Nikita Remeshevskiy	
2025	(France); Dania Mouaden; Théo Bigot	(Italy); Zoe Bianchi; Daniel Basile	(France); Louise Cohas-Bogey; Daniil Grishin	
2026	(France); Dania Mouaden; Theo Bigot	(Italy); Arianna Soldati; Nicholas Tagliabue	(Germany); Dessie Hoewing-Moxley; Artyom Sladkov	
