= Jonathan Hess (figure skater) =

German figure skater (born 2000)

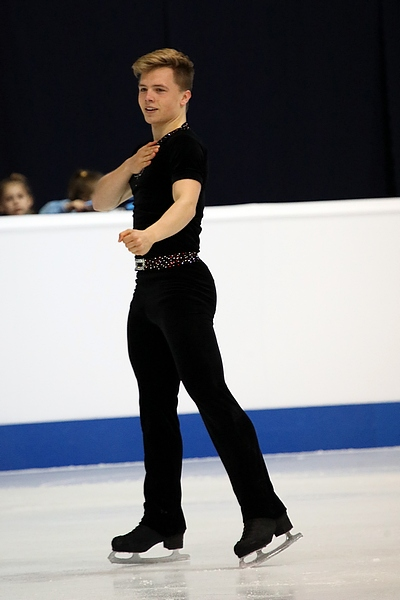
- Jonathan Hess at the 2019 World Junior Championships

Personal information
- Native name: Jonathan Heß
- Born: 9 June 2000 (age 26) Regensburg, Germany
- Home town: Mannheim, Germany
- Height: 1.73 m (5 ft 8 in)

Figure skating career
- Country: Germany
- Discipline: Men's singles
- Began skating: 2004

Medal record
German Championships
| Silver medal – second place | 2020 Oberstdorf | Singles |

Jonathan Hess (German: Jonathan Heß; born 9 June 2000) is a German figure skater. He is the 2020 German national silver medalist and finished within the top ten at the 2018 World Junior Championships.

== Career ==
=== Early years ===
Hess began learning to skate in 2004. He won the German novice men's title in the 2014–15 season and moved up to juniors the following season. His ISU Junior Grand Prix (JGP) debut came in October 2016.

=== 2017–2018 season ===
Hess finished 12th at his sole JGP assignment, in Austria. In January 2018, he became the German national junior men's champion. In March, he competed at the 2018 World Junior Championships in Sofia, Bulgaria; he placed 7th in the short program, 10th in the free skate, and 10th overall.

=== 2018–2019 season ===
Hess competed at two JGP events at the start of the season. He made his senior international debut in October, placing fourth at the Halloween Cup in Budapest, Hungary. He did not compete at the German Championships.

Ranked 18th in the short, he qualified to the free skate and finished 22nd overall at the 2019 World Junior Championships in Zagreb, Croatia. It was his final season of junior eligibility.

=== 2019–2020 season ===
In January 2020, Hess won silver at the German Championships.

== Programs ==
| Season | Short program | Free skating |
|---|---|---|
| 2019–2020 | L-O-V-E by Nat King Cole | The Three Musketeers by Michael Kamen |
| 2018–2019 | Who Wants to Live Forever performed by David Garrett | Pearl Harbor by Hans Zimmer |
| 2017–2018 | Who Wants to Live Forever performed by David Garrett | Pearl Harbor by Hans Zimmer |
| 2016–2017 | Tango Amore by Edvin Marton | Pearl Harbor by Hans Zimmer |

== Competitive highlights ==
CS: Challenger Series; JGP: Junior Grand Prix

International
| Event | 15–16 | 16–17 | 17–18 | 18–19 | 19–20 |
|---|---|---|---|---|---|
| CS Alpen Trophy | | | | WD | |
| CS Finlandia | | | | | 11th |
| CS Nebelhorn | | | | | 13th |
| CS Warsaw Cup | | | | | 18th |
| Bavarian Open | | | | | 4th |
| Challenge Cup | | | | | 5th |
| Halloween Cup | | | | 4th | |
International: Junior
| Junior Worlds | | | 10th | 22nd | |
| JGP Austria | | | 12th | 11th | |
| JGP Czech Rep. | | | | 16th | |
| JGP Germany | | 22nd | | | |
| Bavarian Open | 7th | 4th | 5th | 3rd | |
| Cup of Nice | | | 6th | | |
| Cup of Tyrol | | | 1st | | |
| Hellmut Seibt | 1st | | | | |
| Leo Scheu | | | 1st | | |
| Merano Cup | | 6th | | | |
| NRW Trophy | 11th | 6th | | 3rd | |
National
| German Champ. | 5th J | 7th J | 1st J | | 2nd |
J = Junior
