= Jimena Fama =

- Origin: Buenos Aires, Argentina
- Genres: World, Tango, Latin, Soundtrack
- Years active: 2004–present
- Labels: Maktub Records
- Website: Jimena Fama

Jimena Fama is an Argentine composer, multi-instrumentalist and producer based in New York and Berlin. She releases her music under the name Electro Dub Tango and her own name as well.

== Career ==
Fama’s compositions have been featured in international television programs, including her song "La Bohemia" in Dancing with the Stars (United States and Canada) and Strictly Come Dancing (United Kingdom, Germany, and Denmark). Her song "Malevo" appeared in So You Think You Can Dance (United States). Additional placements include "Mundo Bizarro" in NBC’s television series Endgame, "El Camino" in the Apple TV+ series Servant, Property Brothers and several others.

Starbucks selected her piece "Mundo Bizarro" for a Warner Music compilation of tango recordings that included works by Astor Piazzolla and Yo-Yo Ma.

Her music has also been licensed for commercials and film, including her song "Pampas" for a GUESS fragrance campaign in Paris. Additional placements include the feature film Wallbanger and New Zealand’s World of Wearable Art event, which incorporated "Mundo Bizarro" into its stage production.

Fama has performed at events organized by cultural institutions and private organizations such as the Metropolitan Museum of Art, the Guggenheim Museum in New York, the Argentine Embassy in Washington, D.C., the City of Miami Beach, and the Adrienne Arsht Center. She has also appeared at the Heineken TransAtlantic Festival, Art Basel gatherings hosted by the Faena Group and Larry Gagosian, and at events sponsored by Tesla and Dior. Her performances have been featured at polo tournaments including the Santa Barbara Polo Club, the Maserati Polo Cup, the La Martina Polo Cup, and the Greenwich Polo Open.

She collaborated in concert with jazz organist Dr. Lonnie Smith, performing original works that blended jazz and Argentine influences. She performs regularly in Europe during the summer, with shows in Berlin, Prague, Amsterdam, and other cities.

== Artistic work ==
Fama performs most of the instruments on her albums. Her releases are published through her independent label, Maktub Records. She retains ownership of all her master recordings through her publishing company, MaktubRecords Publishing Co.

== Recognition ==
Fama has been profiled as a "Tango Ambassador" by Alta, the in-flight magazine of Aerolíneas Argentinas. She is affiliated as a Peugeot Artist and is endorsed by Avid Technology and Ultimate Ears Pro.

In 2025, Fama released her first film project, for which she served as writer, director, co-producer, and composer. The production received grant support from the Government of the City of Buenos Aires and Itaú Bank.

=== Performances ===
- Gala Honoring Robert De Niro, Samuel L. Jackson, Spike Lee at the Metropolitan Museum
- Malbec World Day at Guggenheim Museum by Argentinean Consulate
- Malbec World Day at Argentine Embassy in Washington DC
- Larry Gagosian Art Basel
- Faena Group Art Basel Gala
- Consulate of Argentina in New York, Los Angeles and Miami
- Santa Barbara Polo Club
- Maserati Polo Cup
- La Martina Polo Cup
- Greenwich Polo East Coast Open
- Adrienne Arscht Center
- City of Miami Beach

=== TV Placements ===
- NBC TV Series Endgame featuring "Mundo Bizarro" (United States)
- Apple TV Series Servant featuring "El Camino" (United States)
- Dancing with the Stars featuring "La Bohemia" (United States)
- So You Think You Can Dance featuring "La Bohemia" (Canada)
- Strictly Come Dancing featuring "Mundo Bizarro" (Denmark)
- Strictly Come Dancing featuring "Mundo Bizarro" (Germany)
- World of Wearable Art featuring "Mundo Bizarro" (New Zealand)

=== Commercials ===
- GUESS! featuring "Pampas" (France)

== Discography ==
=== Albums ===
- Electro Dub Tango (2005)
- Electro Dub Tango Meets Bossa Nova (2007)
- Electro Dub Tango Meets Europe (2009)
- Electro Dub Tango Meets World Cup (2011)
- Ecos De Buenos Aires (2015)

=== Compilations ===
- STARBUCKS featuring Mundo Bizarro (2007)
- BEGINNERS TANGO GUIDE featuring La Bohemia & La Rivera (2007)
- JAZZMINE. THE FINEST WORLD BEATS BUENOS AIRES featuring Mundo Bizarro & Gira (2007)
- BAR TANGO featuring Mundo Bizarro
- NIKKI BEACH featuring La Bohemia
- TANGO CLUB NIGHT 2 featuring La Bohemia & Malevo (2004)
- JACK DANIEL’S. LAMC featuring Mundo Bizarro (dub version) (2005)
- LIVING EMOTIONS III featuring Gira
- RITZ CARLTON SOUTH BEACH featuring L’Amour
- THE BALLROOM MIX 7 featuring La Conspiracion
- CANDLE LOUNGE featuring Malevo (2014)
- THE TANGO CLUB NIGHT Vol 3 featuring La Mision (2014)
- TRAVEL TUNES. BUTLERS featuring La Rivera (2014)
