= Anastasiia Shabotova =

Russian-Ukrainian figure skater (born 2006)

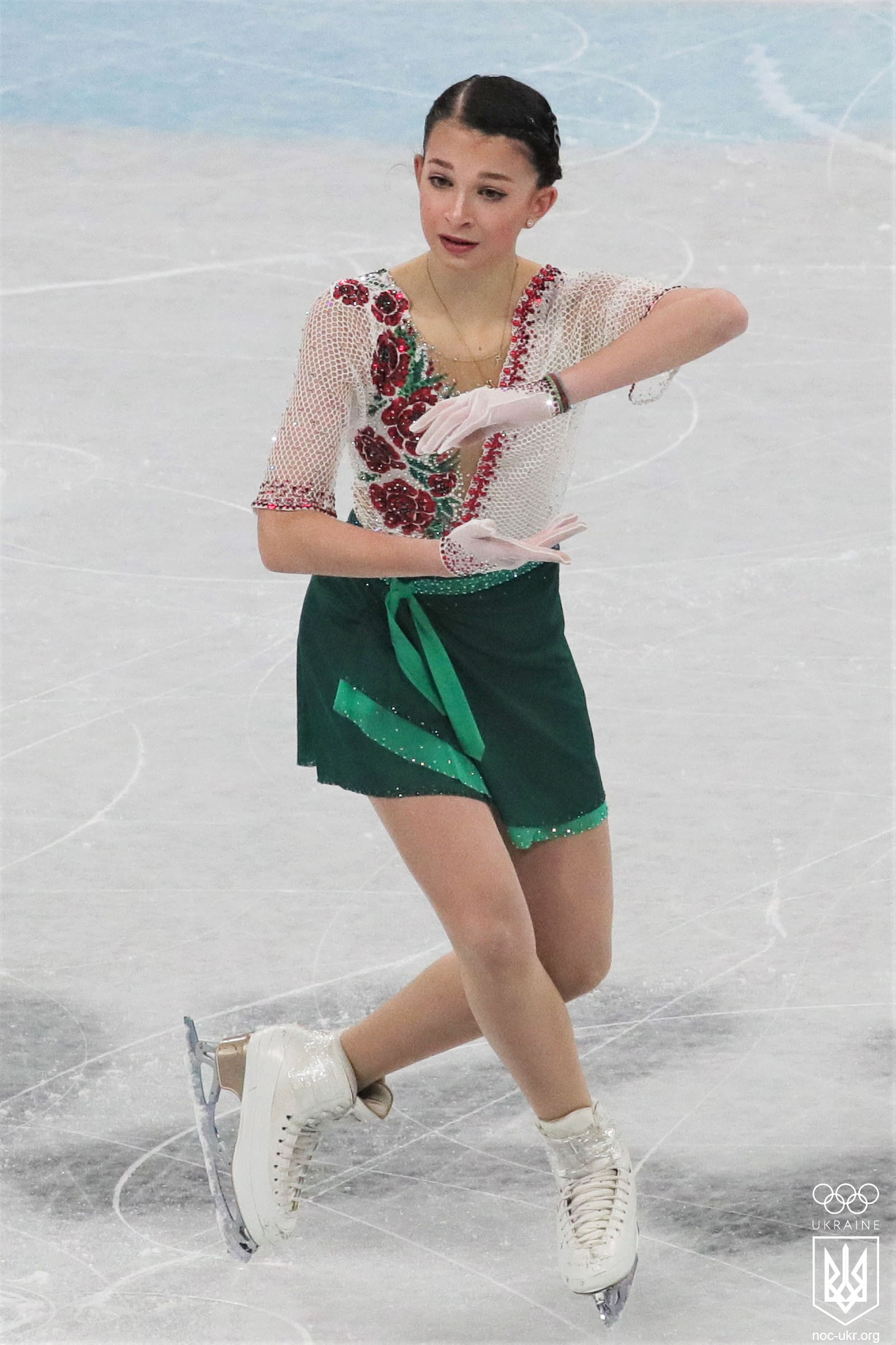
- Shabotova at the 2022 Winter Olympics

Personal information
- Native name: Анастасия Сергеевна Шаботова
- Full name: Anastasiia Sergeevna Shabotova
- Other names: Anastasia
- Born: 17 January 2006 (age 20) Moscow, Russia
- Home town: Kyiv, Ukraine
- Height: 1.54 m (5 ft 1 in)

Figure skating career
- Country: Ukraine (2019–22); Russia (until 2019)
- Coach: Svetlana Panova; Tatiana Moiseeva; Marina Amirkhanova
- Skating club: Sport School "Leader"
- Began skating: 2009

Medal record
Ukrainian Championships
Gold medal – first place	2020 Kyiv	Singles
Gold medal – first place	2021 Kyiv	Singles
Gold medal – first place	2022 Kyiv	Singles

Anastasiia Sergeevna Shabotova (Russian: Анастасия Сергеевна Шаботова, Ukrainian: Анастасія Сергіївна Шаботова; born 17 January 2006) is a Russian-Ukrainian figure skater. Competing for Ukraine, she is the 2021 CS Denis Ten Memorial Challenge bronze medalist and a three-time Ukrainian national champion (2020–2022). She competed in the final segment at the 2020 World Junior Championships. Shabotova is the 12th woman to land a triple Axel internationally and the first Ukrainian woman.

Shabotova originally competed domestically for Russia before requesting to switch nationalities to Ukraine in May 2019 after she made comments during an Instagram livestream that alleged widespread doping among top Russian figure skaters. Although she achieved more international success for Ukraine, including representing the country at the 2022 Winter Olympics, the Ministry of Youth and Sports of Ukraine expelled Shabotova from the Ukrainian national team in March 2022 after she engaged in pro-Russia behavior on social media following the 2022 Russian invasion of Ukraine.

== Personal life ==
Shabotova was born in Moscow, Russia on 17 January 2006. Her mother, Irina, is Ukrainian, and her maternal grandparents continue to live in Ukraine.

=== Doping comments controversy ===
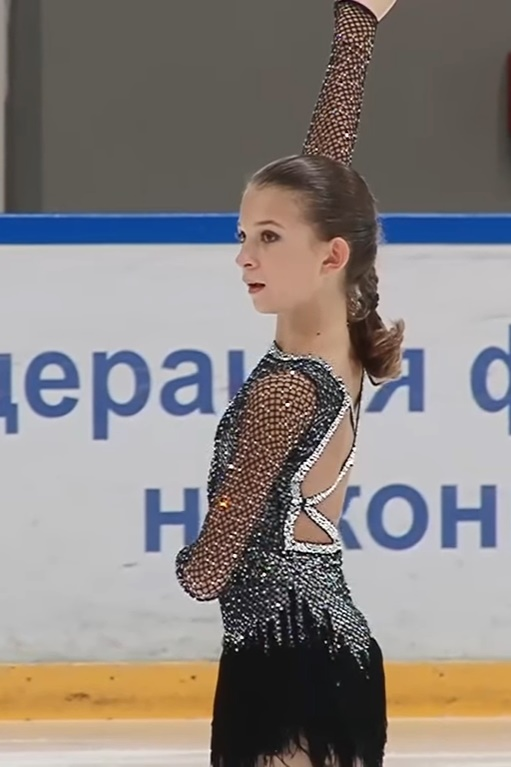
Shabotova at the 2019 Russian Cup Final

On 21 January 2019, in an Instagram live question-and-answer session with her followers, then 13-year-old Shabotova claimed: "How to perform consistently? Drink a lot of dope, and you perform stably. That's all. You just need to drink the right dope." When asked if the skaters at Khrustalny (skaters coached by Eteri Tutberidze, Daniil Gleikhengauz, and Sergei Dudakov, including 2018 Olympic Champion Alina Zagitova) were doping, Shabotova responded: "Of course they do." In response, Tutberidze told the media that she was disappointed that younger skaters viewed doping as the key to success rather than putting in hard work on the ice.

Shabotova's comments led to her being cyberbullied by the Russian figure skating community. Representatives of the Sambo-70 club, home of Khrustalny, demanded punishment for her, and many coaches and prominent figures around the sport regarded her as a persona non grata. However, several fellow athletes and fans came to Shabotova's defense, including two-time World Champion Irina Slutskaya.

Figure Skating Federation of Russia president Aleksandr Gorshkov and Shabotova's coach, Svetlana Panova, both dismissed Shabotova's comments as nonsense. They attributed her comments to her youth and naivety, as well as being asked leading questions. Panova disciplined the skater over her comments but expressed that she did not wish to see Shabotova seriously punished for comments obviously meant in jest. Shabotova's mother also insisted that her daughter did not understand the severity of her comments and was repeating words she may have incorrectly interpreted from gossip around her, and implied that her daughter did not know the difference between doping and taking vitamin supplements. As punishment for her words, her mother confiscated her smartphone. She then asked that Shabotova's career not be ruined over her careless comments.

Russian Anti-Doping Agency head Yuri Ganus promised to hold an explanatory conversation with Shabotova and announced that RUSADA was investigating whether there was any truth to her comments. Representatives of the Moscow City Sports Department also spoke to Shabotova about the validity of her comments.

Shabotova later posted a video on her Instagram account to apologize, stating: "I said something stupid, maybe because I lost in my latest competition. I didn't think they'd misunderstand me."

In February 2022, in the wake of Kamila Valieva's doping controversy, Shabotova commented upon request by the Russian news outlet Championat that "I believe none of us really think anything about the scandal (with Valieva). I simply read about what's going on, and then I immediately forget about it. Nobody really discusses it." She commented as well that she felt only happiness to personally know the Olympic champions.

=== Russian invasion of Ukraine ===
In March 2022, Shabotova liked Evgeni Plushenko's comments on Instagram describing the 2022 Russian invasion of Ukraine as an "unavoidable special operation". Her behavior was harshly criticized on social media by her then-Ukrainian national teammates Anastasiia Arkhipova and Taisiya Spesivtseva; Shabotova removed her "like" after it was noticed by Arkhipova and Spesivtseva. She responded to media requests asking if she supported Plushenko with the following comment: "I like whatever I want, but mostly that which is in my newsfeed. And to think that I support someone with my like is very stupid." After removing her like, Shabotova posted on Instagram the caption: "My position has always been and will always remain this: the world should be without war, without death and fear of people."

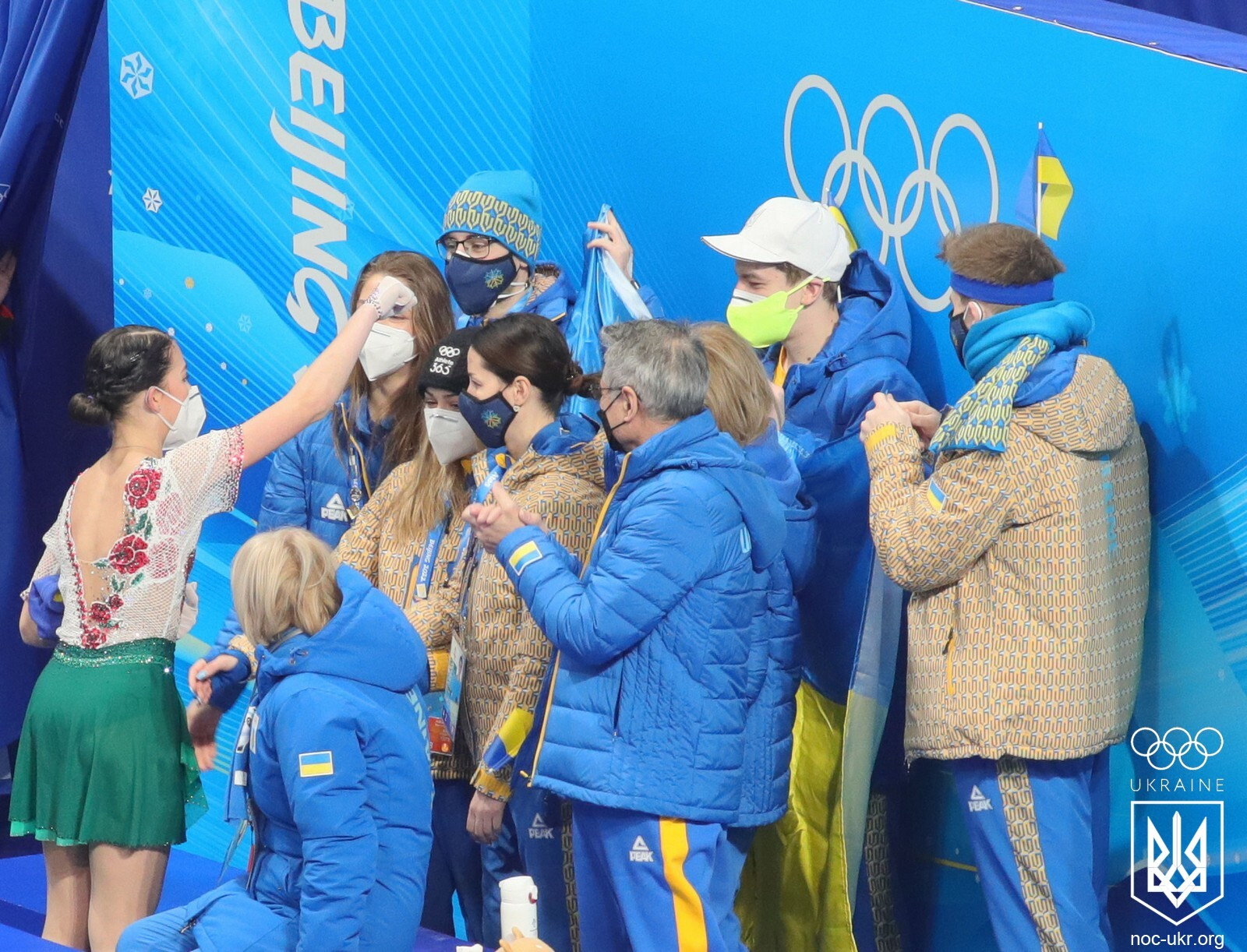
Shabotova with the Ukrainian team at the 2022 Winter Olympics

For her behavior, Shabotova was consequently expelled from the Ukrainian national team by order of the Ministry of Youth and Sports of Ukraine and thereby could not compete at the 2022 World Championships to which she was originally assigned. Plushenko later posted on his Telegram account that he was "ready to accept [Shabotova] into our academy [Angels of Plushenko] and provide all the conditions for training." He confirmed that he had made appeals to the ISU, the Figure Skating Federation of Russia, and the Ukrainian Figure Skating Federation to allow Shabotova to train in and compete for Russia; Shabotova had originally transferred to represent Ukraine after the Russian federation blacklisted her for her comments on doping.

Shabotova's behavior supporting Russia also drew attention to her actions during the 2022 Winter Olympics a month prior, where she expressed support for Kamila Valieva amidst Valieva's doping scandal and expressed happiness at personally knowing the new Olympic champion, Anna Shcherbakova, despite the National Olympic Committee of Ukraine asking its athletes to refrain from interacting with the ROC delegation. She also claimed to the media that her "native language" was Ukrainian and that she was born in Kyiv, despite her official International Skating Union profile showing that she was born in Moscow.

== Career ==
=== Early career ===
Shabotova began skating in 2009 under Irina Strahova in Moscow at the Moskvich School. She moved to train Svetlana Panova and Tatiana Moiseeva at the Snow Leopards Sports School in the 2017–18 season. Shabotova had limited domestic success in Russia, with her highest result being 14th at the 2019 Russian Junior Championships.

On 23 May 2019, Shabotova's request to switch nationalities from Russia to represent her mother's native Ukraine was unanimously approved by the executive committee of the Moscow Federation of Figure Skating.

=== 2019–2020 season ===
Shabotova spent the summer training with Rafael Arutyunyan in the United States while keeping Panova as her head coach. In August, Ukrainian national team head coach Marina Amirkhanova invited her to Ukrainian test skates, where she performed several triple Axel jumps. Despite being age-eligible for international competition, Shabotova was unable to compete on the Junior Grand Prix due to delays from the International Skating Union in processing her nationality transfer.

In October 2019, Shabotova made her international debut at Ice Star, winning the junior gold medal over Niina Petrõkina of Estonia and former Russian teammate Kamila Sultanmagomedova. Shabotova then won the silver medal at the Volvo Open Cup in November, behind Russian Ksenia Sinitsyna and ahead of Maria Bolsheva of Latvia.

At the 2020 Ukrainian Championships in December, Shabotova won the senior gold medal by over 46 points ahead of Taisiya Spesivtseva and Anastasia Gozhva. In her free skate, she unsuccessfully attempted a triple axel. In February, Shabotova again won gold at the 2020 Ukrainian Junior Championships, this time ahead of Dariya Kotenko and Mariia Andriichuk. She finished her season at the 2020 World Junior Championships, finishing 20th overall after placing seventeenth in the short program and twentieth in the free skate. She again unsuccessfully attempted a triple Axel jump in the free skate.

=== 2020–2021 season ===
Due to the COVID-19 pandemic, the Junior Grand Prix, where Shabotova would have competed, was cancelled. She instead opened her season by winning gold at the 2020 Budapest Trophy in October. In the free skate, Shabotova became the twelfth lady to land a triple Axel internationally.

Shabotova did not compete at the 2021 Ukrainian Junior Championships but defended her senior national title at the 2021 Ukrainian Championships in February. She likely would have competed at the 2021 World Junior Championships before it was cancelled, as she was too young to be named to the 2021 World Championships team. Shabotova later revealed in an interview that she had contracted COVID-19 in early December and did not return to the ice until mid-January. She said that after returning to practice, she struggled with the lasting effects of the virus.

=== 2021–2022 season: Olympics and expulsion from Ukrainian national team ===
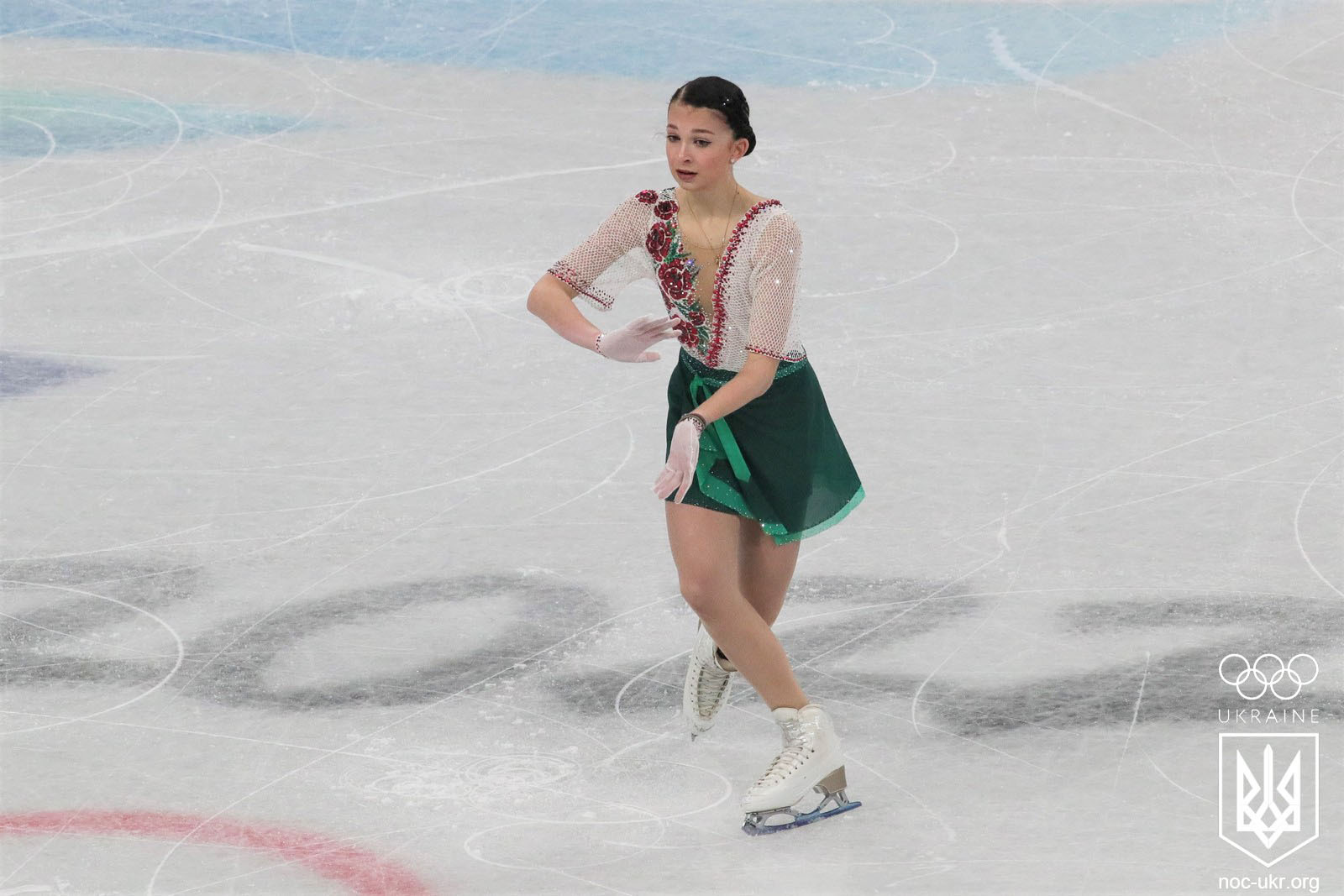
Shabotova at the 2022 Winter Olympics

Shabotova made her international senior debut at the 2021 CS Nebelhorn Trophy, tasked with qualifying a berth for a Ukrainian woman at the 2022 Winter Olympics. She placed fifth in the short program and fourth in the free skate, for fifth place overall and the fifth of six available Olympic spots. In the process, she also qualified a place for Ukraine in the team competition.

Following Nebelhorn, Shabotova competed at three other fall internationals, winning bronze medals at the 2021 CS Denis Ten Memorial Challenge and the Ice Star and finishing sixth at the 2021 CS Warsaw Cup. She won her third consecutive Ukrainian national title. She was assigned to the 2022 European Championships, but withdrew due to unspecified health problems. Shabotova was subsequently named to the Ukrainian Olympic team.

Shabotova placed seventh in the women's short program segment of the Olympic team event, the highest placement for a Ukrainian team member. The Ukrainian team finished tenth and did not advance to the free skate segments. In the short program of the women's event, Shabotova attempted a triple Axel but fell and placed 29th in the segment. She did not advance to the free skate.

She was assigned to compete at the 2022 World Figure Skating Championships but later withdrew. It was subsequently announced that she had been expelled from the Ukrainian national team by order of the Ministry of Youth and Sports of Ukraine after previously liking a pro-invasion post by Evgeni Plushenko.

== Programs ==
Season	Short program	Free skating
2021–2022	Carol of the Bells performed by Tommee Profitt; Shchedryk by Mykola Leontovych choreo. by Nadezhda Kanaeva	You Only Live Twice performed by Nancy Sinatra; James Bond Theme by John Barry; Diamonds Are Forever performed by Shirley Bassey choreo. by Nadezhda Kanaeva
2019–2021	Shape of You; Perfect by Ed Sheeran	You Only Live Twice; James Bond Theme by John Barry

== Competitive highlights ==
CS: Challenger Series; JGP: Junior Grand Prix

=== For Ukraine ===
International
Event	19–20	20–21	21–22
Olympics			29th
Worlds			WD
Europeans			WD
CS Denis Ten MC			3rd
CS Nebelhorn			5th
CS Warsaw Cup			6th
Ice Star			3rd
International: Junior
Junior Worlds	20th		
JGP Slovakia			10th
Budapest Trophy		1st	
Ice Star	1st		
Volvo Open Cup	2nd		
National
Ukrainian Champ.	1st	1st	1st
Ukrainian Junior	1st		
Team events
Olympics			10th T 7th P
TBD = Assigned; WD = Withdrew; Levels: J = Junior

=== For Russia ===
National
Event	2018–19
Russian Junior Champ.	14th

== Detailed results ==
=== Senior results ===
2021–2022 season
Date	Event	SP	FS	Total
February 15–17, 2022	2022 Winter Olympics	29; 48.68	—	29; 48.68
February 4–7, 2022	2022 Winter Olympics – Team event	7; 62.49	—	10^{T}
December 7–8, 2021	2022 Ukrainian Championships	1; 66.04	1; 122.55	1; 188.59
November 17–20, 2021	2021 CS Warsaw Cup	9; 59.95	6; 117.45	6; 177.40
October 28–31, 2021	2021 CS Denis Ten Memorial Challenge	2; 63.92	3; 111.29	3; 175.21
October 14–17, 2021	2021 Ice Star	3; 58.37	3; 109.32	3; 167.69
September 22–25, 2021	2021 CS Nebelhorn Trophy	5; 61.49	4; 116.21	5; 177.70
2020–2021 season
Date	Event	SP	FS	Total
February 23–24, 2021	2021 Ukrainian Championships	1; 53.36	1; 105.79	1; 159.15
2019–2020 season
Date	Event	SP	FS	Total
December 17–19, 2019	2020 Ukrainian Championships	1; 66.80	1; 122.43	1; 189.23

=== Junior results ===
2021–2022 season
Date	Event	SP	FS	Total
September 1–4, 2021	2021 JGP Slovakia	9; 51.21	10; 94.48	10; 145.69
2020–2021 season
Date	Event	SP	FS	Total
October 15–17, 2020	2020 Budapest Trophy	1; 51.42	1; 102.45	1; 153.87
2019–2020 season
Date	Event	SP	FS	Total
March 2–8, 2020	2020 World Junior Championships	17; 52.68	20; 92.17	20; 144.85
February 4–6, 2020	2020 Ukrainian Junior Championships	1; 60.47	1; 118.52	1; 178.99
November 5–10, 2019	2019 Volvo Open Cup	1; 62.40	2; 105.41	2; 167.81
October 14–17, 2019	2019 Ice Star	1; 58.73	1; 116.03	1; 174.76
2018–2019 season
Date	Event	SP	FS	Total
Jan. 31 – Feb. 4, 2019	2019 Russian Junior Championships	15; 57.13	14; 111.32	14; 168.45
