= Aya Hatakawa =

German figure skater

Personal information
- Other names: 畑川 彩 (Japanese)
- Born: 17 August 2004 (age 21) Düsseldorf, Germany
- Home town: Oberstdorf
- Height: 1.60 m (5 ft 3 in)

Figure skating career
- Country: Germany
- Coach: Aljona Savchenko; Florian Just; Niko Ulanovsky; Sergei Rozanov
- Skating club: EC Oberstdorf
- Began skating: 2010

Aya Hatakawa (born 17 August 2004) is a German figure skater. She is the 2021 German national champion.

== Personal life ==
Hatakawa was born on 17 August 2004 in Düsseldorf, Germany to Japanese immigrants from Kōfu, Yamanashi Prefecture. While in primary school, she moved with her mother to Oberstdorf to pursue skating, while her father and older sister remained in Düsseldorf. Hatakawa travels to visit relatives in Nagoya, Japan every few years. She is fluent in German, Japanese, and English.

Hatakawa enjoys listening to music and outdoor activities such as horseback riding. She is interested in becoming in a coach in the future.

== Career ==
=== Early career ===
Hatakawa began skating when she was six years old. Her first coaches were Simon Voges, Ibolya Rospert, and Elena Pickmann in her hometown of Düsseldorf. After moving to Oberstdorf, she trained with Alexander König. Earlier in her career, Hatakawa was the 2018 German novice national champion and 2019 German Junior National Champion.

Hatakawa began working with Aljona Savchenko as her coach in 2018. After Savchenko gave birth in September 2019 and went on maternity leave, Hatakawa added Florian Just and Niko Ulanovsky to her coaching team. In addition to serving as her coach, Savchenko also loans her own old costumes for Hatakawa to compete in.

On her coaching team, Hatakawa remarked: "It’s difficult to receive world-class competitive level training in Germany, so I am very appreciative to receive assistance from such talented coaches. Right after Aljona gave birth, at times she would bring her baby to our training sessions and during those times our coaching team would always support her. We have a new young coach too, and the training is becoming hard and I like it that way, since I want to improve my skating."

=== 2019–2020 season ===
Throughout the season, Hatakawa worked with former ice dancer Nelli Zhiganshina on refining her program choreography from Benoît Richaud. She made her junior international debut by winning the title at the 2019 NRW Summer Trophy. She received her first Junior Grand Prix assignment, placing 15th in Poland. Hatakawa then earned a seventh-place finish at 2019 Golden Bear and won gold at the 2019 Prague Ice Cup.

At the 2020 German Junior Championships, Hatakawa won silver behind Nargiz Süleymanova and ahead of Anastasia Steblyanka. A week later at the 2020 German Championships, she also won silver on the senior level, this time behind Nicole Schott and ahead of Kristina Isaev. Hatakawa reflected that although she was "satisfied," she wanted at each competition "to beat [her] previous record" and continue challenging herself. She was later named alternate for the 2020 World Junior Championships team.

Hatakawa finished sixth at the Mentor Toruń Cup in January. She ended her season at the Bavarian Open, where she placed tenth after the short program in Group I, but withdrew before the free skate. Hatakawa planned to travel to Russia during the early Summer to train with Sergei Rozanov, then the jump specialist coach for Eteri Tutberidze's team, but her plans were cancelled due to the COVID-19 pandemic in Europe.

=== 2020–2021 season ===
Due to the COVID-19 pandemic, the Junior Grand Prix, where Hatakawa would have competed, was cancelled. She instead made her senior international debut at the 2020 CS Nebelhorn Trophy, placing 16th. Hatakawa returned to the junior level at the 2020 NRW Autumn Trophy, where she finished second in both segments to win the silver behind Kimmy Repond of Switzerland and ahead of German teammate Carmen Wolf.

After the 2021 German Championships were relocated, Hatakawa surprisingly prevailed over Olympian and former two-time national champion Nathalie Weinzierl and Dora Hus to win her first national title; reigning champion Nicole Schott was unable to attend the competition due to COVID-related restrictions. After the 2021 German Junior Championships and the 2021 European Championships were cancelled and Schott was named to the 2021 World Championships team, Hatakawa was instead assigned to the 2021 Challenge Cup. She later withdrew.

== Programs ==
| Season | Short program | Free skating |
|---|---|---|
| 2020–2021 | Organ Donor by DJ Shadow choreo. by Benoît Richaud | Exogenesis: Symphony by Muse choreo. by Benoît Richaud |
| 2019–2020 | Tango D'Amor by Tango Jointz; La Bohemia by Electro Dub Tango | Exogenesis: Symphony by Muse choreo. by Benoît Richaud |

== Competitive highlights ==
CS: Challenger Series; JGP: Junior Grand Prix

International
| Event | 16–17 | 17–18 | 18–19 | 19–20 | 20–21 | 21–22 |
|---|---|---|---|---|---|---|
| CS Cup of Austria | | | | | | 24th |
| CS Denis Ten MC | | | | | | WD |
| CS Nebelhorn | | | | | 16th | |
| Bavarian Open | | | | | | 8th |
| Challenge Cup | | | | | WD | |
| NRW Trophy | | | | | | 8th |
International: Junior
| JGP Austria | | | | | | 23rd |
| JGP Poland | | | | 15th | | |
| JGP Slovenia | | | | | | 18th |
| Bavarian Open | | | | WD | | |
| Golden Bear | | | | 7th | | |
| NRW Trophy | | | | 1st | 2nd | |
| Prague Ice Cup | | | | 1st | | |
| Toruń Cup | | | | 6th | | |
International: Advanced novice
| Bavarian Open | | 20th | 8th | | | |
| Inge Solar | | | 4th | | | |
National
| German Champ. | | | | 2nd | 1st | |
| German Junior | 11th N | 7th N | 1st N | 2nd J | C | 2nd J |
TBD = Assigned; WD = Withdrew; C = Event cancelled Levels: N = Advanced novice; J = Junior

== Detailed results ==
ISU Personal best in bold.

=== Senior results ===
**2021–2022 season**
| Date | Event | SP | FS | Total |
| November 11–14, 2021 | 2021 CS Cup of Austria | | | |
**2020–2021 season**
| Date | Event | SP | FS | Total |
| 18–19 December 2020 | 2021 German Championships | 2; 55.60 | 1; 107.27 | 1; 162.87 |
| 23–26 September 2020 | 2020 CS Nebelhorn Trophy | 18; 38.82 | 12; 86.87 | 16; 125.69 |
**2019–2020 season**
| Date | Event | SP | FS | Total |
| 1–3 January 2020 | 2020 German Championships | 2; 58.01 | 3; 96.53 | 2; 154.54 |

=== Junior results ===
**2020–2021 season**
| Date | Event | SP | FS | Total |
| 26–29 November 2020 | 2020 NRW Autumn Trophy | 2; 53.40 | 2; 96.67 | 2; 150.07 |
**2019–2020 season**
| Date | Event | SP | FS | Total |
| 3–9 February 2020 | 2020 Bavarian Open | 10; 44.14 | WD | WD |
| 7–12 January 2020 | 2020 Mentor Toruń Cup | 8; 42.77 | 6; 89.65 | 6; 132.42 |
| 13–15 December 2019 | 2020 German Junior Championships | 3; 48.21 | 2; 93.41 | 2; 141.62 |
| 8–10 November 2019 | 2019 Prague Ice Cup | 1; 53.73 | 3; 90.04 | 1; 143.77 |
| 24–27 October 2019 | 2019 Golden Bear | 2; 54.93 | 7; 84.31 | 7; 139.24 |
| 18–21 September 2019 | 2019 JGP Poland | 17; **43.34** | 14; **87.31** | 15; **130.65** |
| 9–11 August 2019 | 2019 NRW Summer Trophy | 2; 48.44 | 2; 83.71 | 1; 132.15 |
