= Anastasia Dolidze =

Russian pair skater

Personal information
- Full name: Anastasia Alexandrovna Dolidze
- Born: 26 September 1997 (age 28)

Figure skating career
- Country: Russia
- Coach: Andrei Hekalo, Nina Mozer
Medal record
Representing Russia
Figure skating: Pairs
Winter Youth Olympics
Bronze medal – third place	2012 Innsbruck	Pairs

Anastasia Alexandrovna Dolidze (Russian: Анастасия Александровна Долидзе; born 26 September 1997) is a Russian pair skater. With Vadim Ivanov, she is the 2012 Winter Youth Olympics bronze medalist. Dolidze teamed up with Ivanov in 2011, after skating two seasons with Igor Chudin.

== Programs ==
(with Ivanov)

Season	Short program	Free skating
2011–2012		Night on Bald Mountain by Modest Mussorgsky

== Competitive highlights ==
=== With Ivanov ===
International
Event	2011–12	2012–13
Winter Youth Olympics	3rd	
Challenge Cup	2nd J.	
NRW Trophy	2nd J.	3rd J.
Warsaw Cup		7th J.
National
Russian Junior Champ.		10th
J. = Junior level

=== With Chudin ===
National
Event	2010–11
Russian Junior Championships	9th
