= Vadim Ivanov (figure skater) =

Russian pair skater

Personal information
- Full name: Vadim Viacheslavovich Ivanov
- Born: 19 January 1994 (age 32)

Figure skating career
- Country: Russia
- Partner: Vlada Mishina
- Coach: Andrei Hekalo, Nina Mozer
Medal record
Representing Russia
Figure skating: Pairs
Winter Youth Olympics
Bronze medal – third place	2012 Innsbruck	Pairs

Vadim Viacheslavovich Ivanov (Russian: Вадим Вячеславович Иванов; born 19 January 1994) is a Russian pair skater. With former partner Anastasia Dolidze, he is the 2012 Winter Youth Olympics bronze medalist. In 2013, he began competing with Vlada Mishina.

== Programs ==
(with Dolidze)

Season	Short program	Free skating
2011–2012		Night on Bald Mountain by Modest Mussorgsky

== Competitive highlights ==
=== With Mishina ===
International
Event	2013–2014
NRW Trophy	3rd J.
J. = Junior level

=== With Dolidze ===
International
Event	2011–12	2012–13
Winter Youth Olympics	3rd	
Challenge Cup	2nd J.	
NRW Trophy	2nd J.	3rd J.
Warsaw Cup		7th J.
National
Russian Junior Champ.		10th
J. = Junior level
