= German Figure Skating Championships =

Recurring figure skating competition

- Status: Active
- Genre: National championships
- Frequency: Annual
- Country: Germany
- Inaugurated: 1891
- Organizer: German Ice Skating Union

The German Figure Skating Championships (German: Deutsche Meisterschaften im Eiskunstlaufen) are an annual figure skating competition organized by the German Ice Skating Union (German: Deutsche Eislauf-Union) to crown the national champions of Germany. The first official German Championships were held in 1891 in Munich. Pair skating was added in 1907, an event for women in 1911, and ice dance in 1937. Between 1949 and 1990, East Germany held separate championships from West Germany; the West German Championships are considered the official German Championships.

Medals are awarded in men's singles, women's singles, pair skating, and ice dance at the senior and junior levels, although not every discipline is held every year due to a lack of participants. Werner Rittberger, the man credited with inventing the loop jump, holds the record for winning the most German Championship titles in men's singles (with eleven), while Ellen Brockhöft and Nicole Schott are tied for winning the most titles in women's singles (with seven each). Aljona Savchenko holds the record in pair skating (with ten), although these were not all won with the same partner. Three teams are tied for winning the most titles in ice dance (with six each): Angelika Buck and Erich Buck; Kati Winkler and René Lohse; and Nelli Zhiganshina and Alexander Gazsi.

== History ==
While unofficial German figure skating championships were held from 1887 to 1889 in Hamburg, the first official championship event was held in Munich in 1891. A. Schmitson won this inaugural event. Until 1914, skaters from Austria-Hungary frequently competed at the German Championships. Georg Zachariades, who won the 1892 and 1893 championships, was from Vienna, as was Gustav Hügel, who won the championships in 1894. The first national competition in pair skating was held in 1907 in Altona, for women in Olomouc in 1911, and for ice dance in Hamburg in 1937. Competition was frequently interrupted early on, especially from 1915 to 1919 due to World War I.

In March 1938, after the Anschluss – the annexation of the Federal State of Austria into the German Reich – Austria became part of the German Empire and the citizens of Austria became de facto German citizens. They were, therefore, eligible to compete in the German Figure Skating Championships. Edi Rada won the men's championship in 1943; Marta Musilek won the women's championships in 1942, 1943, and 1944; Herta and Emil Ratzenhofer won the pairs championship in 1944; and Jutta Stöhr and Fritz Hackl won the ice dance championship in 1944.

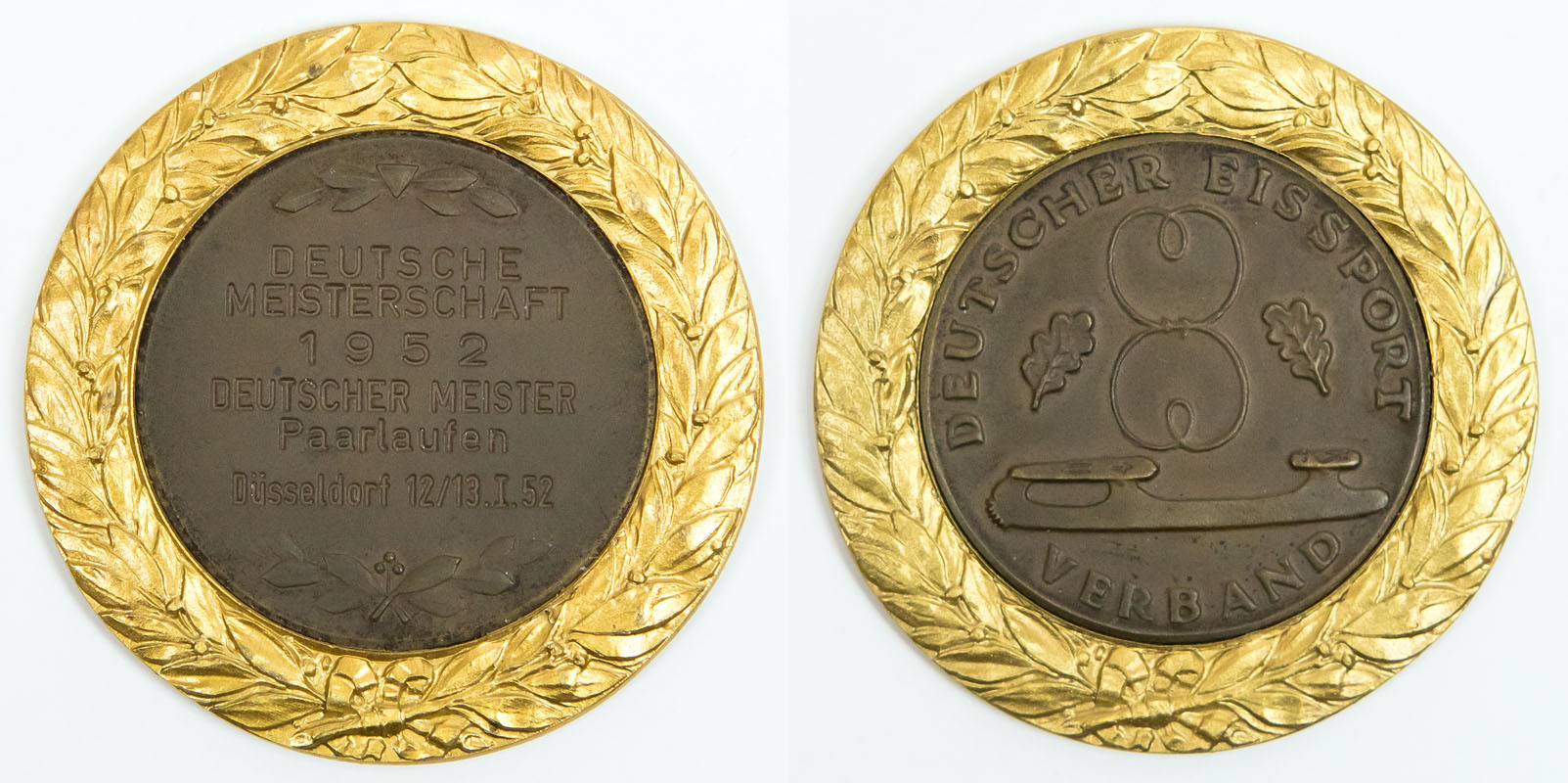
Gold medal from the 1952 German Figure Skating Championships, won by Ria Baran and Paul Falk in pair skating

Following the collapse of the Third Reich in 1945 and its defeat in World War II, Germany was divided into two separate countries: the Federal Republic of Germany (German: Bundesrepublik Deutschland), also known as West Germany, and the German Democratic Republic (German: Deutsche Demokratische Republik), also known as East Germany. The East German Figure Skating Championships (German: DDR Eiskunstlauf Meisterschaften) were held annually from 1949 to 1990. From 1947 to 1990, separate figure skating championships were held in West Germany; those results are considered the historical results of the German Figure Skating Championships.

The dissolution of East Germany occurred on 3 October 1990, leading to its reintegration into the Federal Republic of Germany to form present-day Germany. Following the reunification of Germany, East German skaters began competing at the German Championships, and many former East German skaters became champions of the newly reunified Germany, including Mirko Eichhorn, Alexander König, René Lohse, Axel Rauschenbach, Peggy Schwarz, Ingo Steuer, Kati Winkler, and Ronny Winkler.

The 2021 German Championships were originally scheduled to be held in Hamburg, but were moved to Dortmund due to lockdown restrictions in Hamburg. The competition was held under strict COVID-19 safety protocols, with the skaters isolated from the public during competition. The number of competitors was also smaller than usual, since some of Germany's top skaters, including Nicole Schott, Kristina Isaev, and Jennifer Janse van Rensburg and Benjamin Steffan, who all trained in Oberstdorf, were unable to travel to Dortmund due to quarantine regulations. Additionally, the Berlin Ice Sports Association withdrew all Berlin-based skaters, including Paul Fentz, three days before the event began, citing health concerns. While all senior-level events and junior-level pair skating and ice dance events went ahead as planned, the junior-level single skating events and all novice-level events, which had originally been postponed, were ultimately cancelled.

== Senior medalists ==
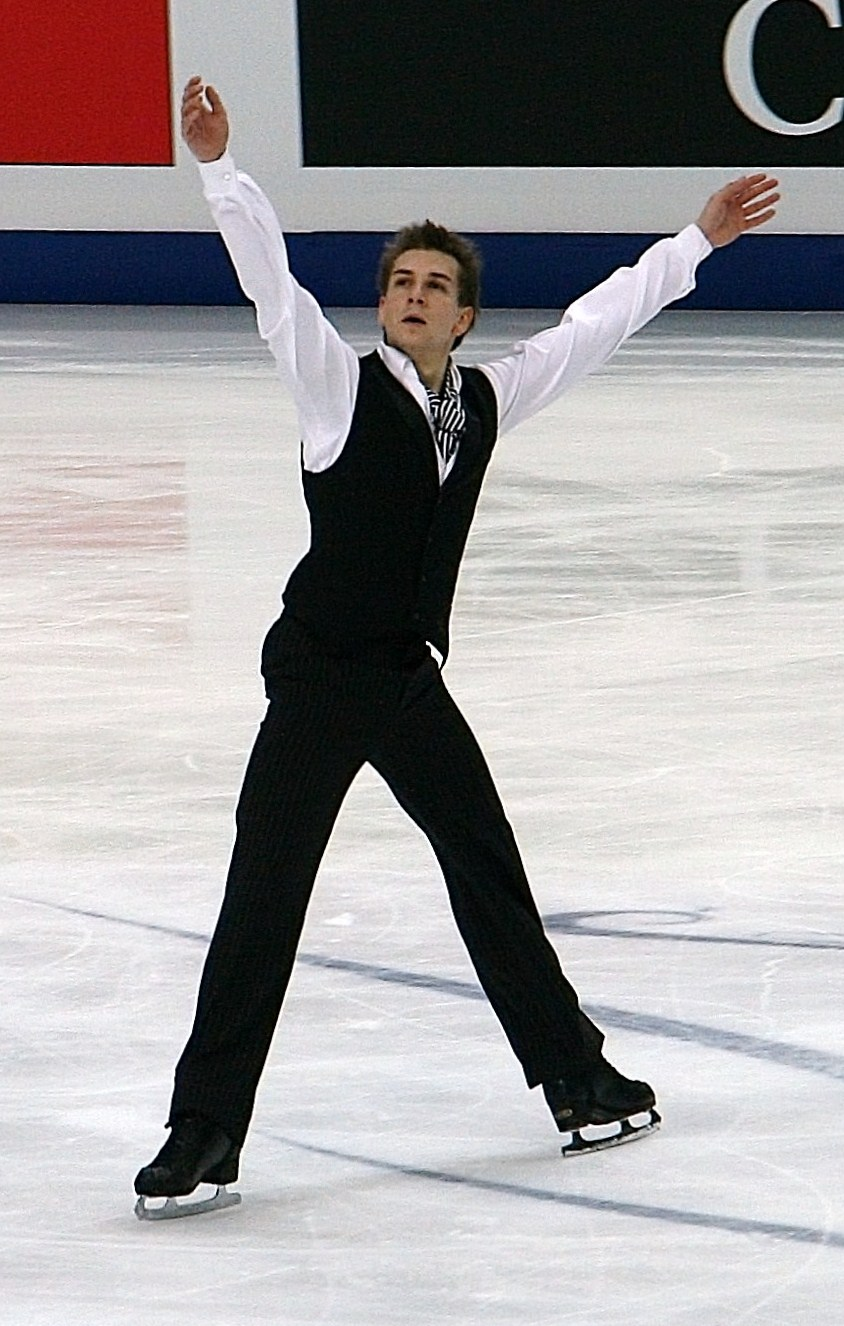
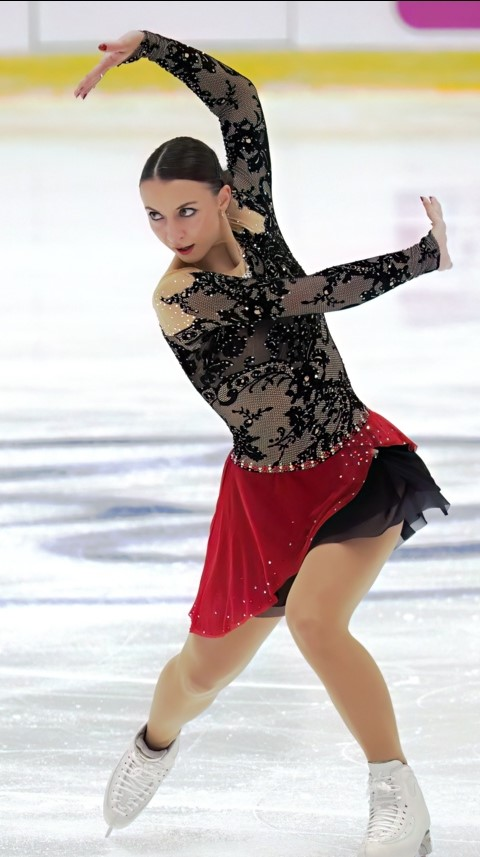
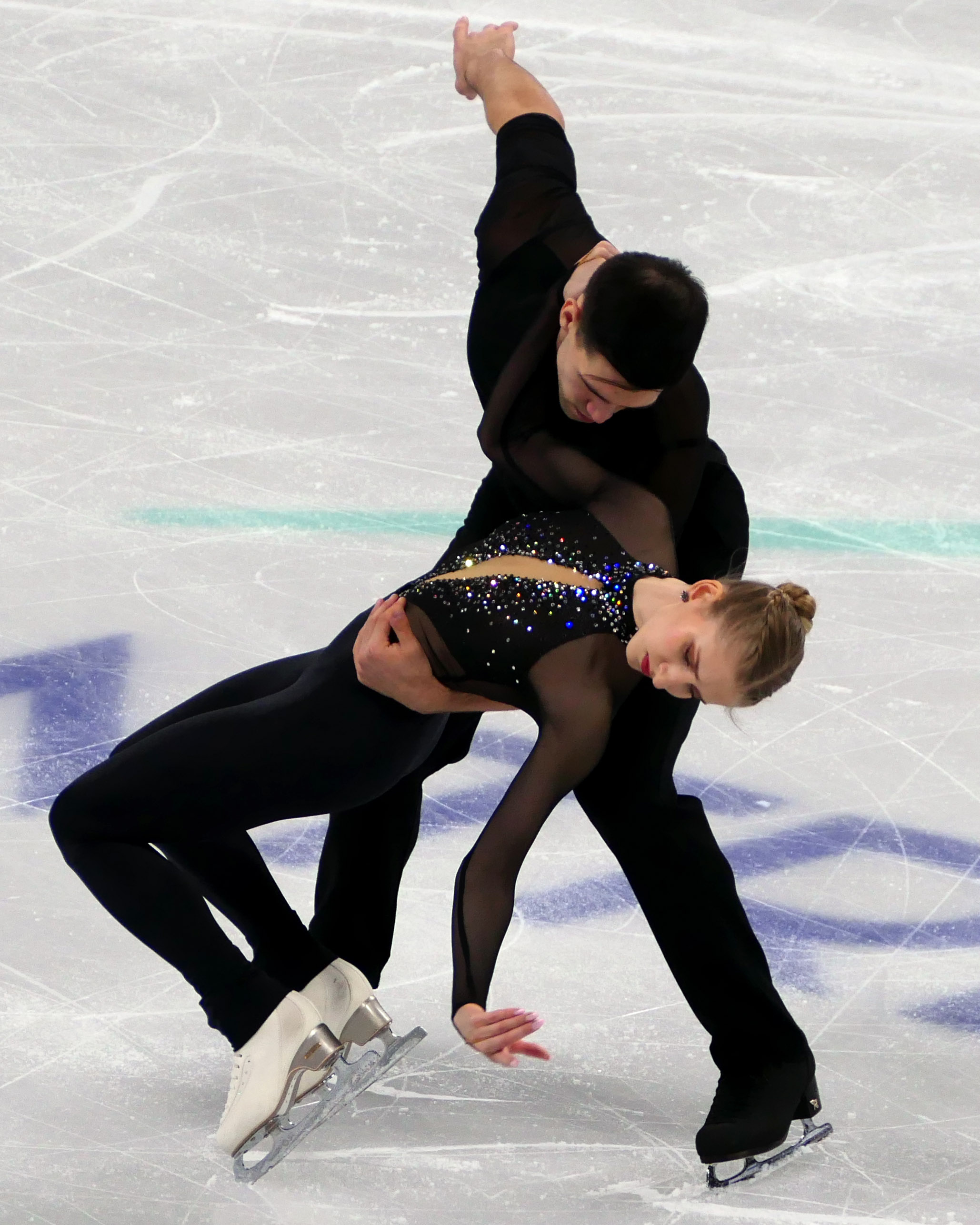
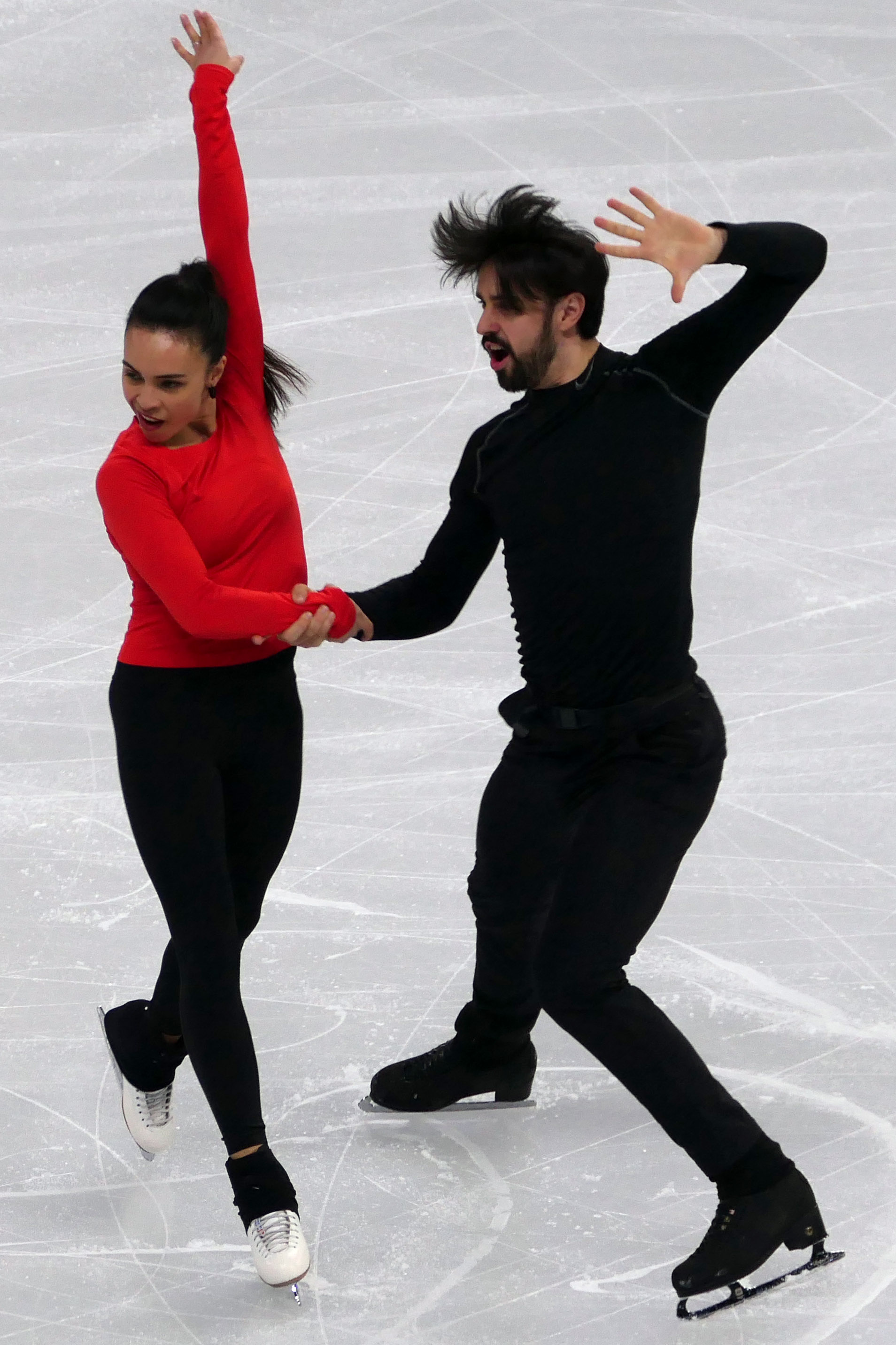
From left to right: Peter Liebers, six-time German champion in men's singles; Nicole Schott, seven-time German champion in women's singles; Minerva Fabienne Hase and Nikita Volodin, six-time German champions in pair skating; and Jennifer Janse van Rensburg and Benjamin Steffan, five-time German champions in ice dance

=== Men’s singles ===
Senior men's event medalists
Year	Location	Gold	Silver	Bronze	Ref.
1891	Munich	A. Schmitson	Carl Kaiser (Austria-Hungary) (Note: Skaters from Austria-Hungary frequently competed in the German Championships until the onset of World War I in 1915.)	No other competitors	
1892	Frankfurt	Georg Zachariades (Austria-Hungary)	Oscar Uhlig	No other competitors	
1893	Hamburg	Georg Zachariades (Austria-Hungary)	Fritz Ahrendt	Franz Zilly	
1894	(Austria-Hungary) Opava (Note: Opava, in present-day Czech Republic, was at this point in time called Troppau and was part of Austria-Hungary.)	Gustav Hügel (Austria-Hungary)	Georg Zachariades (Austria-Hungary)	Alfred Klement (Austria-Hungary)	
1895	Bonn	Gilbert Fuchs	Gustav Hügel (Austria-Hungary)	No other competitors	
1896	Darmstadt	Gilbert Fuchs	No other competitors		
1897	Berlin	Karl Zenger	Alfred Klement (Austria-Hungary)	Kurt Dannenberg	
1898–99	No competitions held				
1900	Berlin	Wilhelm Zenger	Fritz Otto	No other competitors	
1901	(Austria-Hungary) Opava	Wilhelm Zenger	Emil Schindler	Fritz Otto	
1902	No competition held				
1903	Leipzig	Ludwig Niedermeyer	Eugen Dreyer	No other competitors	
1904	Braunschweig	Heinrich Burger	H. Hofmann	Ernst Lassahn	
1905	Bonn	Karl Zenger	Heinrich Burger	Martin Gordan	
1906	Munich	Heinrich Burger	Karl Zenger	Martin Gordan	
1907	Altona	Heinrich Burger	Eugen Dreyer	No other competitors	
1908	No competition held				
1909	Munich	Gilbert Fuchs	Erich Gutleben	Georg Velisch	
1910	No competition held				
1911	Hanover	Werner Rittberger	Alfons Zintl	No other competitors	
1912	Berlin	Werner Rittberger	Artur Vieregg	Otto Möwius	
1913	Berlin	Werner Rittberger	Alfons Zintl	Hugo Metzner	
1914	(Austria-Hungary) Opava	Hugo Metzner	Alfons Zintl	Willy Kaldenbach	
1915–19	No competitions due to World War I				
1920	Berlin	Werner Rittberger	Paul Franke	Artur Vieregg	
1921	Berlin	Werner Rittberger	Paul Franke	Artur Vieregg	
1922	Riessersee	Werner Rittberger	Artur Vieregg	Paul Franke	
1923	Riessersee	Werner Rittberger	Paul Franke	Artur Vieregg	
1924	Berlin	Werner Rittberger	Paul Franke	Artur Vieregg	
1925	Titisee	Werner Rittberger	Paul Franke	Artur Vieregg	
1926	Berlin	Werner Rittberger	Paul Franke	Artur Vieregg	
1927	Berlin	Paul Franke	Werner Rittberger	Herbert Haertel	
1928	Füssen	Werner Rittberger	Paul Franke	Herbert Haertel	
1929	Opole (Note: Opole, in present-day Poland, was at this point in time called Oppeln and was part of the German Empire.)	Paul Franke	Ernst Baier	No other competitors	
1930	Wrocław (Note: Wrocław, in present-day Poland, was at this point in time called Breslau and was part of the German Empire.)	Leopold Maier-Labergo	Herbert Haertel	No other competitors	
1931	Schierke	Leopold Maier-Labergo	Theo Laß	Otto Vierlinger	
1932	Riessersee	Leopold Maier-Labergo	Ernst Baier	Herbert Haertel	
1933	Opole	Ernst Baier	Benno Wellmann	Karl Beuttel	
1934	Braunlage	Ernst Baier	Herbert Haertel	Theo Laß	
1935	Garmisch-Partenkirchen	Ernst Baier	Herbert Haertel	Günther Lorenz	
1936	Garmisch-Partenkirchen	Ernst Baier	Günther Lorenz	Herbert Haertel	
1937	Hamburg	Ernst Baier	Günther Lorenz	Horst Faber	
1938	Cologne	Ernst Baier	Günther Lorenz	Horst Faber	
1939	Berlin	Horst Faber	Edi Rada (Austria) (Note: During the German annexation of Austria from 1938 to 1945, citizens of Austria became de facto German citizens and were thus eligible to compete in the German Championships.)	Ulrich Kuhn	
1940	Vienna	Horst Faber	Edi Rada (Austria)	Hellmut May (Austria)	
1941	Essen	Horst Faber	Edi Rada (Austria)	Hellmut May (Austria)	
1942	Berlin	Erich Zeller	Edi Rada (Austria)	Ulrich Kuhn	
1943	Vienna	Edi Rada (Austria)	Horst Faber	Erich Zeller	
1944	Düsseldorf	Horst Faber	Edi Rada (Austria)	Erich Zeller	
1945–46	No competitions due to World War II				
1947	Garmisch-Partenkirchen	Horst Faber	No other competitors		
1948	Krefeld	Horst Faber	Ulrich Kuhn	Freimut Stein	
1949	Garmisch-Partenkirchen	Horst Faber	Ulrich Kuhn	Freimut Stein	
1950	Krefeld	Horst Faber	Ulrich Kuhn	Hermann Braun	
1951	Hamburg	Horst Faber	Freimut Stein	No other competitors	
1952	Düsseldorf	Freimut Stein	Klaus Loichinger	No other competitors	
1953	Krefeld	Freimut Stein	Klaus Loichinger	Kurt Weilert	
1954	West Berlin	Freimut Stein	Werner Kronemann	Kurt Weilert	
1955	West Berlin	Tilo Gutzeit	Manfred Schnelldorfer	Werner Kronemann	
1956	Cologne	Manfred Schnelldorfer	Tilo Gutzeit	Hans-Jürgen Bäumler	
1957	West Berlin	Manfred Schnelldorfer	Hans-Jürgen Bäumler	Günter Tyroler	
1958	Munich	Manfred Schnelldorfer	Tilo Gutzeit	Hans-Jürgen Bäumler	
1959	West Berlin	Manfred Schnelldorfer	Tilo Gutzeit	Hans-Jürgen Bäumler	
1960	Essen	Manfred Schnelldorfer	Tilo Gutzeit	Sepp Schönmetzler	
1961	Oberstdorf	Manfred Schnelldorfer	Sepp Schönmetzler	Fritz Kessler	
1962	Frankfurt	Sepp Schönmetzler	Fritz Kessler	Peter Krick	
1963	West Berlin	Manfred Schnelldorfer	Sepp Schönmetzler	Hugo Dümmler	
1964	Oberstdorf	Manfred Schnelldorfer	Hugo Dümmler	Jürgen Eberwein	
1965	Cologne	Sepp Schönmetzler	Peter Krick	Bodo Bockenauer	
1966	Füssen	Peter Krick	Bodo Bockenauer	Reinhard Ketterer	
1967	West Berlin	Peter Krick	Ralph Borghard	Jürgen Eberwein	
1968	Essen	Peter Krick	Jürgen Eberwein	Klaus Grimmelt	
1969	Cologne	Reinhard Ketterer	Klaus Grimmelt	Erich Sutor	
1970	Oberstdorf	Klaus Grimmelt	Reinhard Ketterer	Edgar Schneider	
1971	West Berlin	Klaus Grimmelt	Erich Reifschneider	Harald Kuhn	
1972	Bad Nauheim	Harald Kuhn	Erich Reifschneider	Klaus Thiele	
1973	Krefeld	Erich Reifschneider	Harald Kuhn	Klaus Thiele	
1974	Augsburg	Erich Reifschneider	Klaus Thiele	Gerd-Walter Gräbner	
1975	Garmisch-Partenkirchen	Erich Reifschneider	Gerd-Walter Gräbner	Klaus Thiele	
1976	Bremerhaven	Gerd-Walter Gräbner	Thomas Nieder	Kurt Kürzinger	
1977	Garmisch-Partenkirchen	Kurt Kürzinger	Thomas Nieder	Gerd-Walter Gräbner	
1978	Dortmund	Rudi Cerne	Gerd-Walter Gräbner	Thomas Nieder	
1979	Herne	Norbert Schramm	Thomas Nieder	Heiko Fischer	
1980	Garmisch-Partenkirchen	Rudi Cerne	Norbert Schramm	Heiko Fischer	
1981	Unna	Norbert Schramm	Rudi Cerne	Heiko Fischer	
1982	Mannheim	Heiko Fischer	Rudi Cerne	Norbert Schramm	
1983	Oberstdorf	Heiko Fischer	Norbert Schramm	Rudi Cerne	
1984	Unna	Norbert Schramm	Heiko Fischer	Rudi Cerne	
1985	Bremerhaven	Heiko Fischer	Richard Zander	Thomas Wieser	
1986	Mannheim	Heiko Fischer	Richard Zander	Joachim Edel	
1987	West Berlin	Richard Zander	Thomas Wieser	Oliver Dechert	
1988	Unna	Heiko Fischer	Richard Zander	Daniel Weiss	
1989	West Berlin	Richard Zander	Daniel Weiss	Oliver Dechert	
1990	Oberstdorf	Daniel Weiss	Richard Zander	Oliver Dechert	
1991	Berlin	Daniel Weiss	Mirko Eichhorn	Ronny Winkler	
1992	Unna	Mirko Eichhorn	Ronny Winkler	Daniel Weiss	
1993	Mannheim	Ronny Winkler	Patrick-Rene Reinhardt	Gizo Bliadze	
1994	Herne	Ronny Winkler	Mirko Eichhorn	Patrick-Rene Reinhardt	
1995	Oberstdorf	Andrejs Vlaščenko	Ronny Winkler	Mirko Eichhorn	
1996	Berlin	Andrejs Vlaščenko	Ronny Winkler	Michael Hopfes	
1997	Oberstdorf	Andrejs Vlaščenko	Michael Hopfes	Jens ter Laak	
1998	Berlin	Sven Meyer	Andrejs Vlaščenko	Michael Hopfes	
1999	Oberstdorf	Andrejs Vlaščenko	Stefan Lindemann	Michael Hopfes	
2000	Berlin	Stefan Lindemann	Michael Hopfes	Silvio Smalun	
2001	Oberstdorf	Silvio Smalun	Andrejs Vlaščenko	Michael Hörrmann	
2002	Berlin	Stefan Lindemann	Andrejs Vlaščenko	Silvio Smalun	
2003	Oberstdorf	Silvio Smalun	Stefan Lindemann	Andrejs Vlaščenko	
2004	Berlin	Stefan Lindemann	Andrejs Vlaščenko	Silvio Smalun	
2005	Oberstdorf	Stefan Lindemann	Silvio Smalun	Martin Liebers	
2006	Berlin	Stefan Lindemann	Silvio Smalun	Martin Liebers	
2007	Oberstdorf	Stefan Lindemann	Philipp Tischendorf	Martin Liebers	
2008	Dresden	Clemens Brummer	Peter Liebers	Martin Liebers	
2009	Oberstdorf	Peter Liebers	Clemens Brummer	Philipp Tischendorf	
2010	Mannheim	Stefan Lindemann	Peter Liebers	Daniel Dotzauer	
2011	Oberstdorf	Peter Liebers	Denis Wieczorek	Christopher Berneck	
2012	Oberstdorf	Peter Liebers	Paul Fentz	Martin Rappe	
2013	Hamburg	Peter Liebers	Franz Streubel	Paul Fentz	
2014	Berlin	Peter Liebers	Franz Streubel	Paul Fentz	
2015	Stuttgart	Franz Streubel	Paul Fentz	Christopher Berneck	
2016	Essen	Franz Streubel	Paul Fentz	Niko Ulanovsky	
2017	Berlin	Peter Liebers	Paul Fentz	Franz Streubel	
2018	Frankfurt	Paul Fentz	Peter Liebers	Catalin Dimitrescu	
2019	Stuttgart	Paul Fentz	Thomas Stoll	Catalin Dimitrescu	
2020	Oberstdorf	Paul Fentz	Jonathan Hess	Thomas Stoll	
2021	Dortmund	Denis Gurdzhi	Louis Weissert	Fabian Piontek	
2022	Neuss	Paul Fentz	Kai Jagoda	Nikita Starostin	
2023	Oberstdorf	Nikita Starostin	Kai Jagoda	Lotfi Sereir	
2024	Berlin	Kai Jagoda	Nikita Starostin	Denis Gurdzhi	
2025	Oberstdorf	Nikita Starostin	Luca Fünfer	Kai Jagoda	
2026	Oberstdorf	Genrikh Gartung	Nikita Starostin	Kai Jagoda	

=== Women's singles ===
Senior women's event medalists
Year	Location	Gold	Silver	Bronze	Ref.
1911	(Austria-Hungary) Olomouc (Note: Olomouc, in present-day Czech Republic, was at this point in time called Olmütz and was part of Austria-Hungary.)	Elsa Rendschmidt	Grete Strasilla (Austria-Hungary)	No other competitors	
1912	Berlin	Luise Strasilla (Austria-Hungary)	Thea Frenssen	No other competitors	
1913	Berlin	Thea Frenssen	No other competitors		
1914	(Austria-Hungary) Opava	Thea Frenssen	Margarete Janotta (Austria-Hungary)	No other competitors	
1915–16	No competitions due to World War I				
1917	Berlin	Thea Frenssen	Margarete Klebe	Margarethe Winter	
1918	Opole	Thea Frenssen	Elaine Winter	Margarete Klebe	
1919	Berlin	Elaine Winter	Margarete Klebe	Elisabeth Böckel	
1920	Berlin	Elaine Winter	Ellen Brockhöft	Elisabeth Böckel	
1921	Berlin	Ellen Brockhöft	Elisabeth Böckel	Frieda Schneider	
1922	Riessersee	Elaine Winter	Ellen Brockhöft	Elisabeth Böckel	
1923	Riessersee	Ellen Brockhöft	Elisabeth Böckel	No other competitors	
1924	Berlin	Ellen Brockhöft	No other competitors		
1925	Titisee	Ellen Brockhöft	Elisabeth Böckel	No other competitors	
1926	Berlin	Ellen Brockhöft	Gerda Veit	No other competitors	
1927	Berlin	Ellen Brockhöft	Elisabeth Böckel	Gerda Veit	
1928	Füssen	Ellen Brockhöft	Katrin Flebbe	Elaine Winter	
1929	Opole	Katrin Flebbe	Gerda Veit	No other competitors	
1930	Wrocław	Katrin Flebbe	No other competitors		
1931	Schierke	Katrin Flebbe	No other competitors		
1932	Riessersee	Edith Michaelis	Maxi Herber	Paula Schmidt	
1933	Opole	Maxi Herber	Edith Michaelis	Gerda Ibscher	
1934	Braunlage	Maxi Herber	Edith Michaelis	Paula Schmidt	
1935	Garmisch-Partenkirchen	Maxi Herber	Irmi Hartung	Victoria Lindpaintner	
1936	Garmisch-Partenkirchen	Victoria Lindpaintner	Maxi Herber	Irmi Hartung	
1937	Hamburg	Lydia Veicht	Martha Maria Mayerhans	Irmi Hartung	
1938	Cologne	Lydia Veicht	Maxi Herber	Sophie Schmidt	
1939	Krefeld	Lydia Veicht	Hanne Nierenberger (Austria)	Marta Musilek (Austria)	
1940	Munich	Lydia Veicht	Hanne Nierenberger (Austria)	Marta Musilek (Austria)	
1941	Garmisch-Partenkirchen	Lydia Veicht	Marta Musilek (Austria)	Inge Jell	
1942	Vienna	Marta Musilek (Austria)	Inge Jell	Madeleine Müller (Austria)	
1943	Hamburg	Marta Musilek (Austria)	Inge Jell	Madeleine Müller (Austria)	
1944	Munich	Marta Musilek (Austria)	Eva Pawlik (Austria)	Inge Jell	
1945–46	No competitions due to World War II				
1947	Garmisch-Partenkirchen	Inge Jell	Irene Braun	Gudrun Olbricht	
1948	Krefeld	Irene Braun	Marlies Schroer	Gudrun Olbricht	
1949	Garmisch-Partenkirchen	Helga Dudzinski	Irene Braun	Inge Minor	
1950	Cologne	Helga Dudzinski	Erika Kraft	Inge Minor	
1951	Hamburg	Helga Dudzinski	Erika Kraft	Gundi Busch	
1952	Düsseldorf	Erika Kraft	Gundi Busch	Helga Dudzinski	
1953	Krefeld	Gundi Busch	Helga Dudzinski	Rosi Pettinger	
1954	West Berlin	Gundi Busch	Rosi Pettinger	Lilo Kürzinger	
1955	West Berlin	Rosi Pettinger	Erika Rucker	No other competitors	
1956	Cologne	Rosi Pettinger	Ina Bauer	No other competitors	
1957	West Berlin	Ina Bauer	Gabriele Weidert	Gitta Hägler	
1958	Munich	Ina Bauer	Dorle Kirchhofer	Petra Damm	
1959	West Berlin	Ina Bauer	Bärbel Martin	Ursel Barkey	
1960	Essen	Bärbel Martin	Ursel Barkey	Karin Gude	
1961	Oberstdorf	Karin Gude	Bärbel Martin	Ursel Barkey	
1962	Frankfurt	Inge Paul	Doris Weinhausen	Ursel Barkey	
1963	West Berlin	Karin Gude	Inge Paul	Angelika Wagner	
1964	Oberstdorf	Inge Paul	Uschi Keszler	Angelika Wagner	
1965	Cologne	Uschi Keszler	Angelika Wagner	Hannelore Wagner	
1966	Füssen	Angelika Wagner	Uschi Keszler	Monika Feldmann	
1967	West Berlin	Monika Feldmann	Petra Ruhrmann	Eileen Zillmer	
1968	Essen	Monika Feldmann	Petra Ruhrmann	Eileen Zillmer	
1969	Cologne	Eileen Zillmer	Renate Zehnpfennig	Bärbel Fimmen	
1970	Oberstdorf	Eileen Zillmer	Marion von Cetto	Bärbel Fimmen	
1971	West Berlin	Eileen Zillmer	Judith Beyer	Gundi Niesen	
1972	Bad Nauheim	Gerti Schanderl	Isabel de Navarre	Angelika Kräger	
1973	Krefeld	Gerti Schanderl	Isabel de Navarre	Dagmar Lurz	
1974	Augsburg	Gerti Schanderl	Isabel de Navarre	Petra Wagner	
1975	Garmisch-Partenkirchen	Isabel de Navarre	Gerti Schanderl	Dagmar Lurz	
1976	Bremerhaven	Gerti Schanderl	Isabel de Navarre	Dagmar Lurz	
1977	Garmisch-Partenkirchen	Dagmar Lurz	Gerti Schanderl	Garnet Ostermeier	
1978	Dortmund	Dagmar Lurz	Garnet Ostermeier	Karin Riediger	
1979	Dortmund	Dagmar Lurz	Karin Riediger	Petra Ernert	
1980	Garmisch-Partenkirchen	Dagmar Lurz	Karin Riediger	Christina Riegel	
1981	Unna	Karin Riediger	Manuela Ruben	Christina Riegel	
1982	Mannheim	Manuela Ruben	Claudia Leistner	Karin Riediger	
1983	Oberstdorf	Manuela Ruben	Claudia Leistner	Cornelia Tesch	
1984	Unna	Manuela Ruben	Cornelia Tesch	Heike Gobbers	
1985	Bremerhaven	Claudia Leistner	Patricia Neske	Cornelia Tesch	
1986	Mannheim	Claudia Leistner	Cornelia Tesch	Susanne Becher	
1987	West Berlin	Claudia Leistner	Susanne Becher	Cornelia Renner	
1988	Unna	Claudia Leistner	Marina Kielmann	Carola Wolff	
1989	West Berlin	Claudia Leistner	Patricia Neske	Marina Kielmann	
1990	Oberstdorf	Patricia Neske	Marina Kielmann	Carola Wolff	
1991	Berlin	Marina Kielmann	Patricia Neske	Evelyn Großmann	
1992	Unna	Marina Kielmann	Patricia Neske	Simone Lang	
1993	Mannheim	Marina Kielmann	Simone Lang	Tanja Szewczenko	
1994	Herne	Tanja Szewczenko	Katarina Witt	Marina Kielmann	
1995	Oberstdorf	Tanja Szewczenko	Marina Kielmann	Simone Lang	
1996	Berlin	Astrid Hochstetter	Tanja Szewczenko	Andrea Diewald	
1997	Oberstdorf	Eva-Maria Fitze	Andrea Diewald	Veronika Dytrt	
1998	Berlin	Tanja Szewczenko	Eva-Maria Fitze	Caroline Gülke	
1999	Oberstdorf	Eva-Maria Fitze	Tanja Szewczenko	Caroline Gülke	
2000	Berlin	Susanne Stadlmüller	Zoya Douchine	Tanja Szewczenko	
2001	Oberstdorf	Susanne Stadlmüller	Caroline Gülke	Andrea Diewald	
2002	Berlin	Katharina Häcker	Andrea Diewald	Eva-Maria Fitze	
2003	Oberstdorf	Annette Dytrt	Katharina Häcker	Kristina Beutelrock	
2004	Berlin	Annette Dytrt	Denise Zimmerman	Constanze Paulinus	
2005	Oberstdorf	Annette Dytrt	Sarah-Michelle Villanueva	Christiane Berger	
2006	Berlin	Annette Dytrt	Christiane Berger	Marietheres Huonker	
2007	Oberstdorf	Kristin Wieczorek	Christiane Berger	Constanze Paulinus	
2008	Dresden	Sarah Hecken	Isabel Drescher	Annette Dytrt	
2009	Oberstdorf	Annette Dytrt	Constanze Paulinus	Caroline Gülke	
2010	Mannheim	Sarah Hecken	Shira Willner	Julia Pfrengle	
2011	Oberstdorf	Sarah Hecken	Katharina Häcker	Christina Erdel	
2012	Oberstdorf	Nicole Schott	Isabel Drescher	Katharina Zientek	
2013	Hamburg	Sarah Hecken	Nathalie Weinzierl	Sandy Hoffmann	
2014	Berlin	Nathalie Weinzierl	Sarah Hecken	Nicole Schott	
2015	Stuttgart	Nicole Schott	Nathalie Weinzierl	Lutricia Bock	
2016	Essen	Lutricia Bock	Nathalie Weinzierl	Nicole Schott	
2017	Berlin	Nathalie Weinzierl	Lea Johanna Dastich	Annika Hocke	
2018	Frankfurt	Nicole Schott	Nathalie Weinzierl	Lea Johanna Dastich	
2019	Stuttgart	Nicole Schott	Nathalie Weinzierl	Ann-Christin Marold	
2020	Oberstdorf	Nicole Schott	Aya Hatakawa	Kristina Isaev	
2021	Dortmund	Aya Hatakawa	Nathalie Weinzierl	Dora Hus	
2022	Neuss	Nicole Schott	Kristina Isaev	Elisabeth Jäger	
2023	Oberstdorf	Nicole Schott	Kristina Isaev	Elisabeth Jäger	
2024	Berlin	Kristina Isaev	Sarah Marie Pesch	Hanna Keiss	
2025	Oberstdorf	Kristina Isaev	Sarah Marie Pesch	Anna Grekul	
2026	Oberstdorf	Julia Grabowski	Sarah Marie Pesch	Kira Thurner	

=== Pairs ===
Senior pairs event medalists
Year	Location	Gold	Silver	Bronze	Ref.
1907	Altona	Anna Hübler; Heinrich Burger	Frieda Bellinger; Hans Weber	No other competitors	
1908	No competition held				
1909	Munich	Anna Hübler; Heinrich Burger	(Germany); (Finland); Ludowika Eilers; Walter Jakobsson; (Germany & Finland) (Note: Prior to her marriage to Walter Jakobsson, who was from Finland, Ludowika Eilers represented Germany in competition.)	Frau Sonder; Robert Sonder	
1910	No competition held				
1911	Berlin	Alice Rolle; Bruno Grauel	Frau Weber; Hans Weber	No other competitors	
1912	Berlin	Hedwig Winzer; Hugo Winzer	Frau Weber; Hans Weber	(Austria-Hungary); Else Lischka; Oskar Hoppe; (Austria-Hungary)	
1913	Berlin	Rosa Schnell; Georg Velisch	Thea Frenssen; Julius Vogel	Fräulein Dultz; Fritz Hecht	
1914	(Austria-Hungary) Opava	(Austria-Hungary); Else Lischka; Oskar Hoppe; (Austria-Hungary)	Thea Frenssen; Julius Vogel	No other competitors	
1915–19	No competitions due to World War I				
1920	Berlin	Margarete Klebe; Paul Metzner	Hedwig Winzer; Hugo Winzer	No other competitors	
1921	Berlin	No pairs competitors			
1922	Riessersee	Grete Weise; Georg Velisch	Margarete Klebe; Paul Metzner	Fräulein Hoffmann; Bruno Grauel	
1923	Riessersee	Grete Weise; Georg Velisch	Fräulein Hoffmann; Rudolf Eilers	No other competitors	
1924	Berlin	Else Flebbe; Rudolf Eilers	No other competitors		
1925	Titisee	Milly Förster; Hellmuth Jüngling	Marie Schwendtbauer; Gustav Aichinger	Hedwig Winzer; Hugo Winzer	
1926	Berlin	Ilse Kishauer; Herbert Haertel	Milly Förster; Hellmuth Jüngling	No other competitors	
1927	Berlin	Ilse Kishauer; Ernst Gaste	Marie Schwendtbauer; Gustav Aichinger	Else Flebbe; Herr Zehrmann	
1928	Füssen	Ilse Kishauer; Ernst Gaste	Marie Schwendtbauer; Gustav Aichinger	Fräulein Hascher; Hans Widmann	
1929	Opole	Ilse Kishauer; Ernst Gaste	Milly Förster; Hellmuth Jüngling	No other competitors	
1930	Wrocław	Ilse Kishauer; Ernst Gaste	Milly Förster; Hellmuth Jüngling	No other competitors	
1931	Schierke	Ilse Kishauer; Ernst Gaste	Elisabeth Böckel; Wilhelm Hayek	No other competitors	
1932	Riessersee	Wally Hempel; Otto Weiß	Sieglinde Krümling; Alfred Krümling	Marie Schwendtbauer; Gustav Aichinger	
1933	Opole	Wally Hempel; Otto Weiß	Edith Walter; Gerhard Rahn	Meta Gaetzschmann; Hans Gaetzschmann	
1934	Braunlage	Maxi Herber; Ernst Baier	Wally Hempel; Otto Weiß	Marianne Hoffschildt; Rudi Marx	
1935	Garmisch-Partenkirchen	Maxi Herber; Ernst Baier	Wally Hempel; Otto Weiß	Lisa Ruf; Simon Stock	
1936	Garmisch-Partenkirchen	Maxi Herber; Ernst Baier	Eva Prawitz; Otto Weiß	Lisa Ruf; Simon Stock	
1937	Hamburg	Eva Prawitz; Otto Weiß	Inge Koch; Günther Noack	Liselotte Roth; Bruno Walter	
1938	Cologne	Maxi Herber; Ernst Baier	Inge Koch; Günther Noack	Gisela Grätz; Otto Weiß	
1939	Berlin	Maxi Herber; Ernst Baier	(Austria); Ilse Pausin; Erik Pausin; (Austria)	(Austria); Helga Schrittwieser; Pepo Jauernigg; (Austria)	
1940	Vienna	Maxi Herber; Ernst Baier	(Austria); Ilse Pausin; Erik Pausin; (Austria)	Inge Koch; Günther Noack	
1941	Munich	Maxi Herber; Ernst Baier	(Austria); Ilse Pausin; Erik Pausin; (Austria)	Gerda Strauch; Günther Noack	
1942	Cologne	Gerda Strauch; Günther Noack	Ria Baran; Paul Falk	(Austria); Herta Ratzenhofer; Emil Ratzenhofer; (Austria)	
1943	Düsseldorf	Gerda Strauch; Günther Noack	(Austria); Herta Ratzenhofer; Emil Ratzenhofer; (Austria)	Ria Baran; Paul Falk	
1944	Vienna	(Austria); Herta Ratzenhofer; Emil Ratzenhofer; (Austria)	(Austria); (Germany); Marta Musilek; Horst Faber; (Austria & Germany) (Note: Marta Musilek was from Austria, while Horst Faber was from Germany.)	Hedi Nähle; Kurt Müller	
1945–46	No competitions due to World War II				
1947	Garmisch-Partenkirchen	Ria Baran; Paul Falk	Hedwig Trauth; Wilhelm Trauth	No other competitors	
1948	Krefeld	Ria Baran; Paul Falk	Irma Fischlein; Lothar Müller	Marlies Schroer; Hans Schwarz	
1949	Garmisch-Partenkirchen	Ria Baran; Paul Falk	Marlies Schroer; Hans Schwarz	Margit Lauer; Karl Waldeck	
1950	Cologne	Ria Baran; Paul Falk	Marlies Schroer; Hans Schwarz	Inge Minor; Karl Braun	
1951	Hamburg	Ria Baran; Paul Falk	Marlies Schroer; Hans Schwarz	Inge Minor; Karl Braun	
1952	Düsseldorf	Ria Baran; Paul Falk	Inge Minor; Karl Braun	No other competitors	
1953	Krefeld	Helga Krüger; Peter Voß	Eva Neeb; Karl Probst	Margit Lauer; Balz-Willy Göntges	
1954	West Berlin	Inge Minor; Karl Braun	Marika Kilius; Franz Ningel	Lili Zettl; Klaus Loichinger	
1955	West Berlin	Marika Kilius; Franz Ningel	Lili Zettl; Klaus Loichinger	Eva Neeb; Karl Probst	
1956	Cologne	Marika Kilius; Franz Ningel	Eva Neeb; Karl Probst	Rita Paucka; Peter Kwiet	
1957	West Berlin	Marika Kilius; Franz Ningel	Rita Paucka; Peter Kwiet	Monika Wolf; Jürgen Weber	
1958	Munich	Marika Kilius; Hans-Jürgen Bäumler	Rita Blumenberg; Werner Mensching	Monika Wolf; Jürgen Weber	
1959	West Berlin	Marika Kilius; Hans-Jürgen Bäumler	Margret Göbl; Franz Ningel	Rita Blumenberg; Werner Mensching	
1960	Essen	Margret Göbl; Franz Ningel	Marika Kilius; Hans-Jürgen Bäumler	Rita Blumenberg; Werner Mensching	
1961	Oberstdorf	Margret Göbl; Franz Ningel	Marika Kilius; Hans-Jürgen Bäumler	Rita Blumenberg; Werner Mensching	
1962	Frankfurt	Margret Göbl; Franz Ningel	Marika Kilius; Hans-Jürgen Bäumler	Rita Blumenberg; Werner Mensching	
1963	West Berlin	Marika Kilius; Hans-Jürgen Bäumler	Sonja Pfersdorf; Günther Matzdorf	Sigrid Riechmann; Wolfgang Danne	
1964	Oberstdorf	Marika Kilius; Hans-Jürgen Bäumler	Sonja Pfersdorf; Günther Matzdorf	Sigrid Riechmann; Wolfgang Danne	
1965	Cologne	Sonja Pfersdorf; Günther Matzdorf	Margot Glockshuber; Wolfgang Danne	Ingrid Bodendorff; Volker Waldeck	
1966	Füssen	Sonja Pfersdorf; Günther Matzdorf	Gudrun Hauss; Walter Häfner	Margot Glockshuber; Wolfgang Danne	
1967	West Berlin	Margot Glockshuber; Wolfgang Danne	Marianne Streifler; Herbert Wiesinger	Brunhilde Baßler; Eberhard Rausch	
1968	Essen	Margot Glockshuber; Wolfgang Danne	Gudrun Hauss; Walter Häfner	Marianne Streifler; Herbert Wiesinger	
1969	Cologne	Gudrun Hauss; Walter Häfner	Marianne Streifler; Herbert Wiesinger	Brunhilde Baßler; Eberhard Rausch	
1970	Oberstdorf	Brunhilde Baßler; Eberhard Rausch	Almut Lehmann; Herbert Wiesinger	Frigge Drzymalla; Michael Weingart	
1971	West Berlin	Almut Lehmann; Herbert Wiesinger	Brunhilde Baßler; Eberhard Rausch	Annette Neidlinger; Michael Humbs	
1972	Bad Nauheim	Almut Lehmann; Herbert Wiesinger	Corinna Halke; Eberhard Rausch	Gabriele Cieplik; Reinhard Ketterer	
1973	Krefeld	Almut Lehmann; Herbert Wiesinger	Petra Dillmann; Ulrich Hartmann	No other competitors	
1974	Augsburg	Corinna Halke; Eberhard Rausch	Petra Schneider; Bogdan Pulcer	No other competitors	
1975	Garmisch-Partenkirchen	Corinna Halke; Eberhard Rausch	Petra Schneider; Bogdan Pulcer	Gabriele Beck; Jochen Stahl	
1976	Bremerhaven	Corinna Halke; Eberhard Rausch	Gabriele Beck; Jochen Stahl	Sylvia Jäckle; Axel Teschemacher	
1977	Garmisch-Partenkirchen	Susanne Scheibe; Andreas Nischwitz	Gabriele Beck; Jochen Stahl	Rafaela Dondoni; Mario Dondoni	
1978	Dortmund	Susanne Scheibe; Andreas Nischwitz	Gabriele Beck; Jochen Stahl	Gabi Winkler; Michael Kutina	
1979	Herne	Christina Riegel; Andreas Nischwitz	Gabriele Beck; Jochen Stahl	Sylke Morell; Sven Morell	
1980	Garmisch-Partenkirchen	Christina Riegel; Andreas Nischwitz	Gabriele Beck; Jochen Stahl	Petra Hammerlindl; Matthias Möver	
1981	Unna	Christina Riegel; Andreas Nischwitz	Marina Kielmann; Oliver Dörendahl	No other competitors	
1982	Mannheim	Bettina Hage; Stefan Zins	Isabella Caprano; Daniele Caprano	Birgit Kuß; Uwe Fischbeck	
1983	Oberstdorf	Claudia Massari; Leonardo Azzola	Birgit Kuß; Uwe Fischbeck	Isabella Caprano; Daniele Caprano	
1984	Unna	Claudia Massari; Leonardo Azzola	Susanne Becher; Stefan Pfrengle	Birgit Kuß; Uwe Fischbeck	
1985	Bremerhaven	Claudia Massari; Daniele Caprano	Kerstin Kimminus; Stefan Pfrengle	No other competitors	
1986	Mannheim	Kerstin Kimminus; Stefan Pfrengle	Marianne Ocvirek; Holger Malez	No other competitors	
1987	West Berlin	Sonja Adalbert; Daniele Caprano	Kerstin Kimminus; Stefan Pfrengle	Nicole Neujahr; Marc Drüner	
1988	Unna	Brigitte Groh; Holger Maletz	Anuschka Gläser; Stefan Pfrengle	Sonja Adalbert; Daniele Caprano	
1989	West Berlin	Anuschka Gläser; Stefan Pfrengle	Sonja Adalbert; Daniele Caprano	Heike Hack; Markus Korndörfer	
1990	Oberstdorf	Anuschka Gläser; Stefan Pfrengle	Henriette Wörner; Andreas Sigurdsson	Tatiana Demovic; Holer Maletz	
1991	Berlin	Mandy Wötzel; Axel Rauschenbach	Peggy Schwarz; Alexander König	Anuschka Gläser; Stefan Pfrengle	
1992	Unna	Peggy Schwarz; Alexander König	Mandy Wötzel; Axel Rauschenbach	Anuschka Gläser; Stefan Pfrengle	
1993	Mannheim	Mandy Wötzel; Ingo Steuer	Jekaterina Silnitzkaya; Marno Kreft	Nadine Pflaum; Kristijan Simeunovic	
1994	Herne	Anuschka Gläser; Axel Rauschenbach	Peggy Schwarz; Alexander König	Mandy Hannebauer; Marno Kreft	
1995	Oberstdorf	Mandy Wötzel; Ingo Steuer	Jekaterina Silnitzkaja; Mirko Müller	Silvia Dimitrov; Rico Rex	
1996	Berlin	Mandy Wötzel; Ingo Steuer	Silvia Dimitrov; Rico Rex	Emilie Gras; Mirko Müller	
1997	Oberstdorf	Mandy Wötzel; Ingo Steuer	Peggy Schwarz; Mirko Müller	Ulrike Rumi; Thomas Dörmer	
1998	Berlin	Peggy Schwarz; Mirko Müller	No other competitors		
1999	Oberstdorf	Peggy Schwarz; Mirko Müller	Stefanie Weiss; Matthias Bleyer	Mariana Kautz; Norman Jeschke	
2000	Berlin	Peggy Schwarz; Mirko Müller	Mariana Kautz; Norman Jeschke	Katharina Rybkowski; Rico Rex	
2001	Oberstdorf	Claudia Rauschenbach; Robin Szolkowy	Brigitte Maier; Rastislav Grejtak	No other competitors	
2002	Berlin	Sarah Jentgens; Mirko Müller	Mariana Kautz; Norman Jeschke	Nicole Nönnig; Matthias Bleyer	
2003	Oberstdorf	Eva-Maria Fitze; Rico Rex	Nicole Nönnig; Matthias Bleyer	Anika Bahn; Paul Pradel	
2004	Berlin	Aljona Savchenko; Robin Szolkowy	Eva-Maria Fitze; Rico Rex	Mikkeline Kierkgaard; Norman Jeschke	
2005	Oberstdorf	Aljona Savchenko; Robin Szolkowy	Rebecca Handke; Daniel Wende	Eva-Maria Fitze; Rico Rex	
2006	Berlin	Aljona Savchenko; Robin Szolkowy	Rebecca Handke; Daniel Wende	Eva-Maria Fitze; Rico Rex	
2007	Oberstdorf	Aljona Savchenko; Robin Szolkowy	Mari Vartmann; Florian Just	No other competitors	
2008	Dresden	Aljona Savchenko; Robin Szolkowy	Mari Vartmann; Florian Just	Ekaterina Vasilieva; Daniel Wende	
2009	Oberstdorf	Aljona Savchenko; Robin Szolkowy	Maylin Hausch; Daniel Wende	Mari Vartmann; Florian Just	
2010	Mannheim	Maylin Hausch; Daniel Wende	Nicole Gurny; Martin Liebers	No other competitors	
2011	Oberstdorf	Aljona Savchenko; Robin Szolkowy	Mari Vartmann; Aaron Van Cleave	Katharina Gierok; Florian Just	
2012	Oberstdorf	Maylin Hausch; Daniel Wende	Mari Vartmann; Aaron Van Cleave	No other competitors	
2013	Hamburg	Annabelle Prölß; Ruben Blommaert	Mari Vartmann; Aaron Van Cleave	No other competitors	
2014	Berlin	Aljona Savchenko; Robin Szolkowy	Maylin Wende; Daniel Wende	Mari Vartmann; Aaron Van Cleave	
2015	Stuttgart	Mari Vartmann; Aaron Van Cleave	Minerva Fabienne Hase; Nolan Seegert	No other competitors	
2016	Essen	Aliona Savchenko; Bruno Massot	Mari Vartmann; Ruben Blommaert	Minerva Fabienne Hase; Nolan Seegert	
2017	Berlin	Mari Vartmann; Ruben Blommaert	No other competitors		
2018	Frankfurt	Aliona Savchenko; Bruno Massot	Minerva Fabienne Hase; Nolan Seegert	Annika Hocke; Ruben Blommaert	
2019	Stuttgart	Minerva Fabienne Hase; Nolan Seegert	Annika Hocke; Ruben Blommaert	No other competitors	
2020	Oberstdorf	Minerva Fabienne Hase; Nolan Seegert	Annika Hocke; Robert Kunkel	No other competitors	
2022	Neuss	Minerva Fabienne Hase; Nolan Seegert	Alisa Efimova; Ruben Blommaert	No other competitors	
2023	Oberstdorf	Annika Hocke; Robert Kunkel	Letizia Roscher; Luis Schuster	No other competitors	
2024	Berlin	Minerva Fabienne Hase; Nikita Volodin	Katalin Janne Salatzki; Lukas Roseler	No other competitors	
2025	Oberstdorf	Minerva Fabienne Hase; Nikita Volodin	Letizia Roscher; Luis Schuster	No other competitors	
2026	Oberstdorf	Minerva Fabienne Hase; Nikita Volodin	Annika Hocke; Robert Kunkel	Letizia Roscher; Luis Schuster	

=== Ice dance ===
Senior ice dance event medalists
Year	Location	Gold	Silver	Bronze	Ref.
1937	Hamburg	Eva Prawitz; Theo Laß	Sophie Schmidt; Josef Rambold	Irmgard Posern; Hans Mahlfeldt	
1938	Cologne	Eva Prawitz; Theo Laß	Sophie Schmidt; Josef Rambold	No other competitors	
1939	Essen	(Austria); Edith Winkelmann; Walter Löhner; (Austria)	(Austria); Trude Wagner; Fritz Staniek; (Austria)	(Austria); Jutta Stöhr; Fritz Hackl; (Austria)	
1940	Berlin	(Austria); Edith Winkelmann; Walter Löhner; (Austria)	(Austria); Jutta Stöhr; Fritz Hackl; (Austria)	(Austria); Trude Wagner; Fritz Staniek; (Austria)	
1941	Cologne	(Austria); Edith Winkelmann; Walter Löhner; (Austria)	(Austria); Jutta Stöhr; Fritz Hackl; (Austria)	(Austria); Hertha Branowitzer; Rudolf Plaschke; (Austria)	
1942	Garmisch-Partenkirchen	(Austria); Edith Winkelmann; Walter Löhner; (Austria)	(Austria); Jutta Stöhr; Fritz Hackl; (Austria)	(Austria); Trude Hörmann; Fritz Kolbinger; (Austria)	
1943	Ice dance competition cancelled				
1944	Berlin	(Austria); Jutta Stöhr; Fritz Hackl; (Austria)	Gerda Lusch; Hans Bitter	(Austria); Hermi Rittmann; Fritz Staniek; (Austria)	
1945–46	No competitions due to World War II				
1947–49	No ice dance competitions				
1950	Garmisch-Partenkirchen	Eva Prawitz; Horst Faber	Hedwig Trauth; Wilhelm Trauth	Jutta Piotrowski; Hagemann	
1951	Garmisch-Partenkirchen	Hella Lamprecht; Kurt Müller	Jutta Piotrowski; Hagemann	Hedwig Trauth; Wilhelm Trauth	
1952	Garmisch-Partenkirchen	Marlies Schroer; Kurt Müller	Hedwig Trauth; Wilhelm Trauth	Erika Schiechtl; Hermann Schiechtl	
1953	Nuremberg	Hedwig Trauth; Wilhelm Trauth	Maria Goeth; Willi Wernz	Margot Holzapfel; Helmut Loefke	
1954	Cologne	Maria Jühe; Eberhard Vitger	Sigrid Knake; Gunther Koch	Maria Goeth; Willi Wernz	
1955	Mannheim	Hedwig Trauth; Wilhelm Trauth	Maria Goeth; Willi Wernz	Rita Pauka; Peter Kwiet	
1956	Garmisch-Partenkirchen	Sigrid Knake; Gunther Koch	Gerda Wolgemuth; Hannes Burkhardt	Rita Pauka; Peter Kwiet	
1957	West Berlin	Sigrid Knake; Gunther Koch	Rita Pauka; Peter Kwiet	Elly Thal; Otto Huber	
1958	Munich	Rita Pauka; Peter Kwiet	Petra Steigerwald; Hannes Burkhardt	No other competitors	
1959	West Berlin	Rita Pauka; Peter Kwiet	Elly Thal; Hannes Burkhardt	Anneliese Hackl; Ernst Stritzinger	
1960	Essen	Rita Pauka; Peter Kwiet	Elly Thal; Hannes Burkhardt	Margot Nissen; Gerhard Maier	
1961	Oberstdorf	Rita Pauka; Peter Kwiet	Martha Schamberger; Hans-Jürgen Schamberger	Margot Nissen; Klaus Ebel	
1962	Frankfurt	Helga Burkhardt; Hannes Burkhardt	Rita Pauka; Peter Kwiet	Gabriele Rauch; Rudi Matysik	
1963	West Berlin	Helga Burkhardt; Hannes Burkhardt	Rita Pauka; Peter Kwiet	Martha Schamberger; Hans-Jürgen Schamberger	
1964	Oberstdorf	Gabriele Matysik; Rudi Matysik	Jutta Peters; Wolfgang Kunz	Martha Schamberger; Hans-Jürgen Schamberger	
1965	Cologne	Gabriele Matysik; Rudi Matysik	Jutta Peters; Wolfgang Kunz	Martha Schamberger; Hans-Jürgen Schamberger	
1966	Füssen	Gabriele Matysik; Rudi Matysik	Angelika Buck; Erich Buck	Karin Witt; Heiner Kern	
1967	West Berlin	Gabriele Matysik; Rudi Matysik	Angelika Buck; Erich Buck	Martha Schamberger; Hans-Jürgen Schamberger	
1968	Essen	Angelika Buck; Erich Buck	Edeltraud Rotty; Joachim Iglowstein	Heidi Grote; Reinhard Strate	
1969	Cologne	Angelika Buck; Erich Buck	Edeltraud Rotty; Joachim Iglowstein	Waltraud Hollweg; Fred Schulz	
1970	Oberstdorf	Angelika Buck; Erich Buck	Astrid Kopp; Axel Kopp	Sylvia Fuchs; Michael Fuchs	
1971	West Berlin	Angelika Buck; Erich Buck	Astrid Kopp; Axel Kopp	Angelika Wiesner; Hans-Jürgen Wiesner	
1972	Bad Nauheim	Angelika Buck; Erich Buck	Sylvia Fuchs; Michael Fuchs	Astrid Kopp; Axel Kopp	
1973	Krefeld	Angelika Buck; Erich Buck	Sylvia Fuchs; Michael Fuchs	Astrid Kopp; Axel Kopp	
1974	Augsburg	Sylvia Fuchs; Michael Fuchs	Nicole Rinsant; Dirk Beyer	Gabriele Schäfer; Robert Dietz	
1975	Garmisch-Partenkirchen	Christina Henke; Udo Dönsdorf	Gabriele Schäfer; Robert Dietz	Nicole Rinsant; Michael Fuchs	
1976	Bremerhaven	Christina Henke; Udo Dönsdorf	Gabriele Schäfer; Robert Dietz	Sonja Ulmann; Uwe Dörnenburg	
1977	Garmisch-Partenkirchen	Gabriele Schäfer; Robert Dietz	Sonja Ulmann; Uwe Dörnenburg	Monika Kuchler; Michael Kuchler	
1978	Dortmund	Henriette Fröschl; Christian Steiner	Karin Albrecht; Dirk Beyer	Monika Kuchler; Michael Kuchler	
1979	Herne	Henriette Fröschl; Christian Steiner	Elke Kwiet; Dieter Kwiet	Birgit Goller; Peter Klisch	
1980	Garmisch-Partenkirchen	Henriette Fröschl; Christian Steiner	Birgit Goller; Peter Klisch	Elke Kwiet; Dieter Kwiet	
1981	Unna	Birgit Goller; Peter Klisch	Petra Born; Rainer Schönborn	Elke Kwiet; Dieter Kwiet	
1982	Mannheim	Birgit Goller; Peter Klisch	Petra Born; Rainer Schönborn	Elke Kwiet; Markus Heyenbrock	
1983	Oberstdorf	Petra Born; Rainer Schönborn	Antonia Becherer; Ferdinand Becherer	Ruth Werner; Peter Werner	
1984	Unna	Petra Born; Rainer Schönborn	Antonia Becherer; Ferdinand Becherer	Susanne Kutzer; Niklas Heyenbrock	
1985	Bremerhaven	Petra Born; Rainer Schönborn	Antonia Becherer; Ferdinand Becherer	Sabine Kern; Stefan Kern	
1986	Mannheim	Antonia Becherer; Ferdinand Becherer	Andrea Weppelmann; Hendryk Schamberger	Antonia Gavazzeni; Sven Authorsen	
1987	West Berlin	Antonia Becherer; Ferdinand Becherer	Andrea Weppelmann; Hendryk Schamberger	Antonia Gavazzeni; Sven Authorsen	
1988	Unna	Antonia Becherer; Ferdinand Becherer	Andrea Weppelmann; Hendryk Schamberger	Vera Zietemann; Andreas Ullmann	
1989	West Berlin	Andrea Weppelmann; Hendryk Schamberger	Petra Zietemann; Frank Ladd-Oshiro	Antonia Gavazzeni; Wolfgang Wetzler	
1990	Oberstdorf	Saskia Stähler; Sven Authorsen	Petra Zietemann; Frank Ladd-Oshiro	Andrea Weppelmann; Hendryk Schamberger	
1991	Berlin	Saskia Stähler; Sven Authorsen	Jennifer Goolsbee; Hendryk Schamberger	Alexandra Golovine; Wolfgang Wetzler	
1992	Unna	Jennifer Goolsbee; Hendryk Schamberger	Kati Winkler; René Lohse	Eva Possart; Stefan Possart	
1993	Mannheim	Jennifer Goolsbee; Samuel Gezolian	Kati Winkler; René Lohse	Yvonne Schulz; Sven Authorsen	
1994	Herne	Jennifer Goolsbee; Samuel Gezolian	Yvonne Schulz; Sven Authorsen	Kati Winkler; René Lohse	
1995	Oberstdorf	Jennifer Goolsbee; Samuel Gezolian	Kati Winkler; René Lohse	Yvonne Schulz; Sven Authorsen	
1996	Berlin	Kati Winkler; René Lohse	Tarja Kühlfluck; Ralf Seidel	Melissa Möhler; Michael Osthoff	
1997	Oberstdorf	Jennifer Goolsbee; Samuel Gezolian	Melissa Möhler; Michael Osthoff	Stephanie Rauer; Thomas Rauer	
1998	Berlin	Kati Winkler; René Lohse	Stephanie Rauer; Thomas Rauer	Sandra Arndt; Matthias Lieder	
1999	Oberstdorf	Kati Winkler; René Lohse	Stephanie Rauer; Thomas Rauer	Alexandra Shows; Michael Osthoff	
2000	Berlin	Kati Winkler; René Lohse	Stephanie Rauer; Thomas Rauer	Barbara Hantusch; Denis Samokhine	
2001	Oberstdorf	Stephanie Rauer; Thomas Rauer	Jill Vernekohl; Dmitri Kurakin	Natalie Spies; Sebastian Fraas	
2002	Berlin	Stephanie Rauer; Thomas Rauer	Jill Vernekohl; Dmitri Kurakin	No other competitors	
2003	Oberstdorf	Kati Winkler; René Lohse	Miriam Steinel; Vladimir Tsvetkov	Stephanie Rauer; Thomas Rauer	
2004	Berlin	Kati Winkler; René Lohse	Christina Beier; William Beier	No other competitors	
2005	Oberstdorf	Christina Beier; William Beier	Judith Haunstetter; Arne Hönlein	Barbara Piton; Alexandre Piton	
2006	Berlin	Christina Beier; William Beier	Nelli Zhiganshina; Alexander Gazsi	Judith Haunstetter; Arne Hönlein	
2007	Oberstdorf	Nelli Zhiganshina; Alexander Gazsi	No other competitors		
2008	Dresden	Christina Beier; William Beier	Nelli Zhiganshina; Alexander Gazsi	Carolina Hermann; Daniel Hermann	
2009	Oberstdorf	Carolina Hermann; Daniel Hermann	Nelli Zhiganshina; Alexander Gazsi	Tanja Kolbe; Sascha Rabe	
2010	Mannheim	Christina Beier; William Beier	Carolina Hermann; Daniel Hermann	Nelli Zhiganshina; Alexander Gazsi	
2011	Oberstdorf	Nelli Zhiganshina; Alexander Gazsi	Stefanie Frohberg; Tim Giesen	Tanja Kolbe; Stefano Caruso	
2012	Oberstdorf	Nelli Zhiganshina; Alexander Gazsi	Tanja Kolbe; Stefano Caruso	Carolina Hermann; Daniel Hermann	
2013	Hamburg	Nelli Zhiganshina; Alexander Gazsi	Tanja Kolbe; Stefano Caruso	Kavita Lorenz; Ievgen Kholoniuk	
2014	Berlin	Nelli Zhiganshina; Alexander Gazsi	Tanja Kolbe; Stefano Caruso	No other competitors	
2015	Stuttgart	Nelli Zhiganshina; Alexander Gazsi	Jennifer Urban; Sevan Lerche	Nathalie Rehfeldt; Bennett Preiss	
2016	Essen	Kavita Lorenz; Panagiotis Polizoakis	Katharina Müller; Tim Dieck	Aurelija Ipolito; Bennett Preiss	
2017	Berlin	Kavita Lorenz; Joti Polizoakis	Katharina Müller; Tim Dieck	Shari Koch; Christian Nüchtern	
2018	Frankfurt	Kavita Lorenz; Joti Polizoakis	Katharina Müller; Tim Dieck	Shari Koch; Christian Nüchtern	
2019	Stuttgart	Shari Koch; Christian Nüchtern	Katharina Müller; Tim Dieck	Jennifer Janse van Rensburg; Benjamin Steffan	
2020	Oberstdorf	Katharina Müller; Tim Dieck	Jennifer Janse van Rensburg; Benjamin Steffan	Shari Koch; Christian Nüchtern	
2021	Dortmund	Katharina Müller; Tim Dieck	No other competitors		
2022	Neuss	Jennifer Janse van Rensburg; Benjamin Steffan	Katharina Müller; Tim Dieck	Lara Luft; Maximilian Pfisterer	
2023	Oberstdorf	Jennifer Janse van Rensburg; Benjamin Steffan	Charise Matthaei; Max Liebers	No other competitors	
2024	Berlin	Jennifer Janse van Rensburg; Benjamin Steffan	Charise Matthaei; Max Liebers	Karla Maria Karl; Kai Hoferichter	
2025	Oberstdorf	Jennifer Janse van Rensburg; Benjamin Steffan	Charise Matthaei; Max Liebers	Karla Maria Karl; Kai Hoferichter	
2026	Oberstdorf	Jennifer Janse van Rensburg; Benjamin Steffan	Charise Matthaei; Max Liebers	Karla Maria Karl; Kai Hoferichter	

== Junior medalists ==
=== Men's singles ===
Junior men's event medalists
Year	Location	Gold	Silver	Bronze	Ref.
2002	Chemnitz	Peter Liebers	Steffen Hörmann	Julian Bässler	
2003	Oberstdorf	Marcel Kotzian	Philipp Tischendorf	Norman Keck	
2004	Oberstdorf	Philipp Tischendorf	Marcel Kotzian	Adrian Schager	
2005	Oberstdorf	Norman Keck	Philipp Tischendorf	Denis Wieczorek	
2006	Berlin	Daniel Dotzauer	Michael Biondi	Alan Riefert	
2007	Oberstdorf	Daniel Dotzauer	Franz Streubel	Denis Wieczorek	
2008	Dresden	Daniel Dotzauer	Patrick Stein	Christopher Berneck	
2009	Oberstdorf	Paul Fentz	Matii Landgraf	Denis Wieczorek	
2010	Mannheim	Martin Rappe	Alexander Schöpke	Christopher Berneck	
2011	Oberstdorf	Martin Rappe	Niko Ulanovsky	Maxim Stiefel	
2012	Oberstdorf	Niko Ulanovsky	Alexander Schöpke	Joti Polizoakis	
2013	Oberstdorf	Joti Polizoakis	Alexander Bjelde	Anton Kempf	
2014	Oberstdorf	Joti Polizoakis	Alexander Bjelde	Anton Kempf	
2015	Oberstdorf	Anton Kempf	Catalin Dimitrescu	Dave Kötting	
2016	Berlin	Catalin Dimitrescu	Dave Kötting	Kai Jagoda	
2017	Mannheim	Thomas Stoll	Thomas Junski	Isaak Droysen	
2018	Chemnitz	Jonathan Hess	Kai Jagoda	Denis Gurdzhi	
2019	Dortmund	Denis Gurdzhi	Daniel Sapozhnikov	Louis Weissert	
2020	Mannheim	Denis Gurdzhi	Nikita Starostin	Louis Weissert	
2021	Dortmund	Junior singles competitions cancelled due to the COVID-19 pandemic			
2022	Dortmund	Louis Weissert	Denis Gurdzhi	Arthur Mai	
2023	Oberstdorf	Luca Fünfer	Hugo Willi Herrmann	Alexander Vlascenko	
2024	Oberstdorf	Luca Fünfer	Hugo Willi Herrmann	Leon Rojkov	
2025	Oberstdorf	Genrikh Gartung	Robert Wildt	Hugo Willi Herrmann	
2026	Oberstdorf	Soner Öztürk	Felix Zeng	Leon Rojkov	

=== Women's singles ===
For championships where there was an unusually high number of competitors, the skaters were divided into two groups, with each group competing separately from the other.

Junior women's event medalists
Year	Location	Gold	Silver	Bronze	Ref.
2002	Chemnitz	Group I: Denise Zimmermann	Group I: Melanie Meyer	Group I: Mari Vartmann	
2002	Chemnitz	Group II: Rebecca Handke	Group II: Anne Sachtler	Group II: Laura Stosno	
2003	Oberstdorf	Group I: Amanda Valentine	Group I: Wenke Ludwig	Group I: Melanie Meyer	
2003	Oberstdorf	Group II: Cornelia Beyermann	Group II: Marietheres Huonker	Group II: Tanja Rautenberg	
2004	Oberstdorf	Group I: Laura Linde	Group I: Yvonne Plechinger	Group I: Bettina Bayer	
2004	Oberstdorf	Group II: Marietheres Huonker	Group II: Alina Zetzsche	Group II: Kristina Kolberg	
2005	Oberstdorf	Bettina Bayer	Brigitte Blickling	Katharina Teljuk	
2006	Berlin	Group I: Nicole Scheck	Group I: Bettina Bayer	Group I: Ina Seterbakken	
2006	Berlin	Group II: Katja Grohmann	Group II: Jessica Erdin	Group II: Annchristin Huonker	
2007	Oberstdorf	Group I: Sarah Hecken	Group I: Isabel Drescher	Group I: Katharina Gierok	
2007	Oberstdorf	Group II: Jessica Kosuch	Group II: Jessica Hujsl	Group II: Caroline Mey	
2008	Dresden	Briana Munoz	Nathalie Weinzierl	Bettina Bayer	
2009	Oberstdorf	Julia Pfrengle	Bettina Bayer	Josephine Klinger	
2010	Mannheim	Luisa Weber	Jessica Füssinger	Jennifer Urban	
2011	Oberstdorf	Anne Zetzsche	Anna Baumgartel	Amani Fancy	
2012	Oberstdorf	Angelika Dubinski	Maria Herceg	Anna Baumgärtel	
2013	Oberstdorf	Lutricia Bock	Annabelle Prölß	Natalia Fartushina	
2014	Oberstdorf	Lutricia Bock	Maria Herceg	Alissa Scheidt	
2015	Oberstdorf	Lea Johanna Dastich	Maria Herceg	Kristina Isaev	
2016	Berlin	Kristina Isaev	Annika Hocke	Alissa Scheidt	
2017	Mannheim	Jennifer Schmidt	Dora Hus	Ann-Christin Marold	
2018	Chemnitz	Ann-Christin Marold	Franziska Kettl	Tina Helleken	
2019	Dortmund	Ann-Christin Marold	Elodie Eudine	Katalin Janne Salatzki	
2020	Mannheim	Nargiz Suleymanova	Aya Hatakawa	Anastasia Steblyanka	
2021	Dortmund	Junior singles competitions cancelled due to the COVID-19 pandemic			
2022	Dortmund	Olesya Ray	Aya Hatakawa	Janne Salatzki	
2023	Oberstdorf	Olesya Ray	Valentina Adrianova	Anna Grekul	
2024	Oberstdorf	Olesya Ray	Nicol Kalugina	Ina Jungmann	
2025	Oberstdorf	Anna Gerke	Julia Grabowski	Ina Jungmann	
2026	Oberstdorf	Anna Gerke	Diana Ziesecke	Adelina Voroteliak	

=== Pairs ===
Junior pairs event medalists
Year	Location	Gold	Silver	Bronze	Ref.
2002	Chemnitz	Anika Bahn; Paul Pradel	No other competitors		
2003	Oberstdorf	Rebecca Handke; Daniel Wende	Anika Bahn; Paul Pradel	No other competitors	
2004	Oberstdorf	Rebecca Handke; Daniel Wende	Soja Belostozkaja; Paul Pradel	No other competitors	
2006	Berlin	Maylin Hausch; Steffen Hörmann	No other competitors		
2009	Oberstdorf	Juliana Gudzhi; Alexander Völler	Vanessa Schöche; Andreas Müller	No other competitors	
2010	Mannheim	Juliana Gudzhi; Alexander Völler	Karolin Salatzki; Nolan Seegert	No other competitors	
2011	Oberstdorf	Linda Wenzig; Matti Landgraf	No other competitors		
2012	Oberstdorf	Annabelle Prölß; Ruben Blommaert	Julia Linch; Konrad Hocker-Scholler	Christin Schotte; Kevin Kottek	
2013	Oberstdorf	Vanessa Bauer; Nolan Seegert	Julia Linch; Konrad Hocker-Scholler	Christin Schotte; Kevin Kottek	
2014	Oberstdorf	Julia Linckh; Konrad Hocker-Scholler	No other competitors		
2015	Oberstdorf	Minori Yuge; Jannis Bronisefski	No other competitors		
2016	Berlin	Minori Yuge; Jannis Bronisefski	No other competitors		
2017	Mannheim	Talisa Thomalla; Robert Kunkel	No other competitors		
2019	Stuttgart	Talisa Thomalla; Robert Kunkel	Letizia Roscher; Luis Schuster	Josephine Lossius; Niclas Rust	
2020	Oberstdorf	Letizia Roscher; Luis Schuster	Josephine Lossius; Niclas Rust	No other competitors	
2021	Dortmund	Letizia Roscher; Luis Schuster	No other competitors		
2022	Neuss	Letizia Roscher; Luis Schuster	No other competitors		
2023	Oberstdorf	Sonja Löwenherz; Robert Löwenherz	Aliyah Ackermann; Tobija Harms	Josephine Lossius; Artem Rotar	
2024	Berlin	Sonja Löwenherz; Robert Löwenherz	Aliyah Ackermann; Tobija Harms	Anastasia Steblyanka; Lukas Gneiding	
2025	Oberstdorf	Aliyah Ackermann; Tobija Harms	Sonja Löwenherz; Robert Löwenherz	No other competitors	
2026	Oberstdorf	Anfisa Sevastianova; Lukas Gneiding	Sophie Krebs; Ilia Trofymov	Sonja Löwenherz; Robert Löwenherz	

=== Ice dance ===
Junior ice dance event medalists
Year	Location	Gold	Silver	Bronze	Ref.
2002	Chemnitz	Christina Beier; William Beier	Maria Binczyk; Marco Derpa	Caroline Gross; Sascha Hanika	
2003	Oberstdorf	Judith Haunstetter; Arne Hönlein	Sandra Gissmann; Marco Derpa	No other competitors	
2004	Oberstdorf	Judith Haunstetter; Arne Hönlein	Sandra Gissmann; Marco Derpa	Rina Thieleke; Sascha Rabe	
2005	Oberstdorf	Rina Thieleke; Sascha Rabe	Carolina Hermann; Daniel Hermann	Tanja Kolbe; Paul Boll	
2006	Berlin	Tanja Kolbe; Paul Boll	Carolina Hermann; Daniel Hermann	Ashley Foy; Benjamin Blum	
2007	Oberstdorf	Carolina Hermann; Daniel Hermann	Tanja Kolbe; Sascha Rabe	Saskia Brall; Tim Giesen	
2008	Dresden	Ashley Foy; Benjamin Blum	Jana Werner; Tim Giesen	Ekaterina Zabolotnaya; Julian Wagner	
2009	Oberstdorf	Dominique Dieck; Michael Zenkner	Shirleen Schönfeld; Justin Gerke	Shari Koch; Christian Nüchtern	
2010	Mannheim	Stefanie Frohberg; Tim Giesen	Dominique Dieck; Michael Zenkner	Shari Koch; Christian Nüchtern	
2011	Oberstdorf	Shari Koch; Christian Nüchtern	Dominique Dieck; Michael Zenkner	Juliane Haslinger; Tom Finke	
2012	Oberstdorf	Shari Koch; Christian Nüchtern	Katharina Müller; Justin Gerke	Kathrin Häuser; Sevan Lerche	
2013	Oberstdorf	Shari Koch; Christian Nüchtern	Ria Schiffner; Julian Salatzki	Kathrin Häuser; Sevan Lerche	
2014	Oberstdorf	Polina Gorlov; Eduard Vishnyakov	Loreen Geiler; Sven Miersch	Leah-Magdalena Steffan; Benjamin Steffan	
2015	Stuttgart	Katharina Müller; Tim Dieck	Ria Schwendinger; Valentin Wunderlich	Leah-Magdalena Steffan; Benjamin Steffan	
2016	Berlin	Ria Schwendinger; Valentin Wunderlich	Charise Matthaei; Maximilian Pfisterer	Sandrine Hofstetter; Benjamin Steffan	
2017	Mannheim	Charise Matthaei; Maximilian Pfisterer	Sabrina Bittner; Andrei Lebed	Sarah Michelle Knispel; Maximilian Voigtländer	
2018	Frankfurt	Ria Schwendinger; Valentin Wunderlich	Charise Matthaei; Maximilian Pfisterer	Lara Luft; Asaf Kazimov	
2019	Stuttgart	Charise Matthaei; Maximilian Pfisterer	Lara Luft; Asaf Kazimov	Anne-Marie Wolf; Max Liebers	
2020	Oberstdorf	Lara Luft; Stephano Schuster	Anne-Marie Wolf; Max Liebers	Viktoria Lopusova; Asaf Kazimov	
2021	Dortmund	Anne-Marie Wolf; Max Liebers	Lilia Schubert; Kieren Wagner	No other competitors	
2022	Neuss	Darya Grimm; Michail Savitskiy	Karla Maria Karl; Kai Hoferichter	Janne Kummer; Erik Kummer	
2023	Oberstdorf	Darya Grimm; Michail Savitskiy	Karla Maria Karl; Kai Hoferichter	Alexia Kruk; Jan Eisenhaber	
2024	Berlin	Darya Grimm; Michail Savitskiy	Lilia Schubert; Nikita Remeshevskiy	Alexia Kruk; Jan Eisenhaber	
2025	Oberstdorf	Darya Grimm; Michail Savitskiy	Alexia Kruk; Jan Eisenhaber	Lilia Schubert; Nikita Remeshevskiy	
2026	Oberstdorf	Alexia Kruk; Jan Eisenhaber	Nelly Elisa Hemcke; Artyom Sladkov	Enikö Kóbor; Zoárd Kóbor	

== Records ==
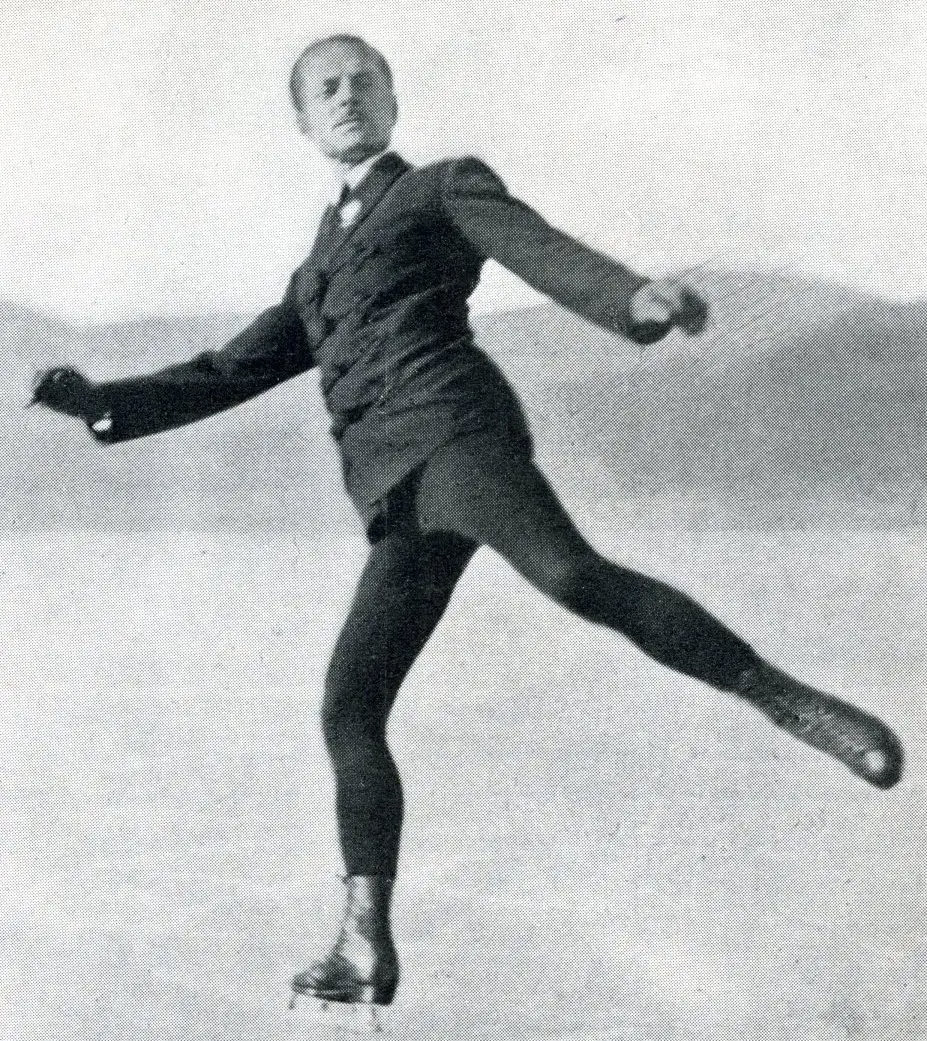
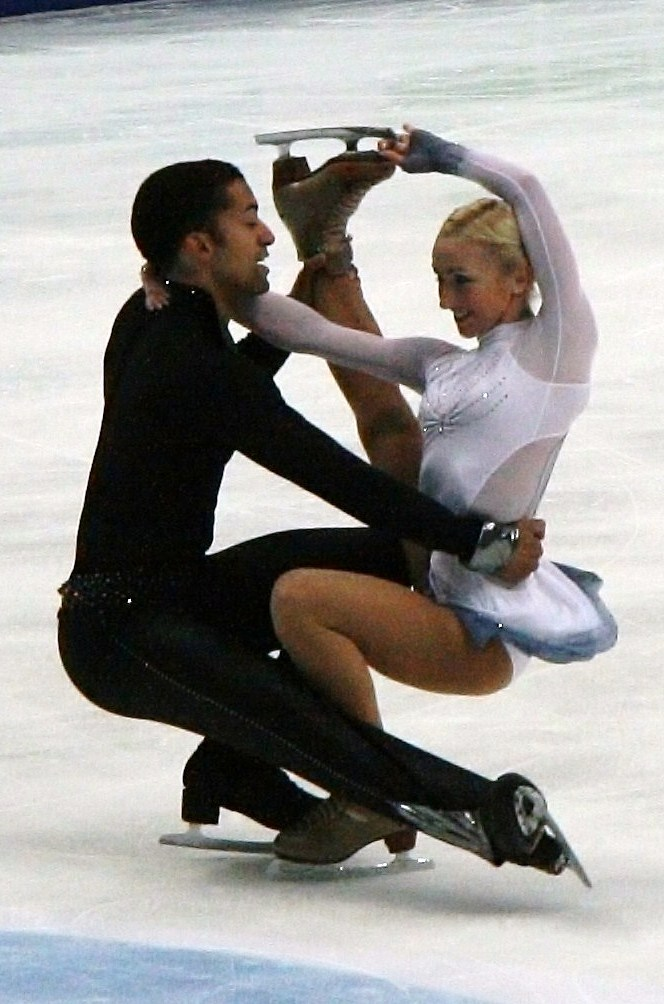
From left to right: Werner Rittberger won eleven German Championship titles in men's singles; and Aljona Savchenko and Robin Szolkowy won eight German Championship titles in pair skating.
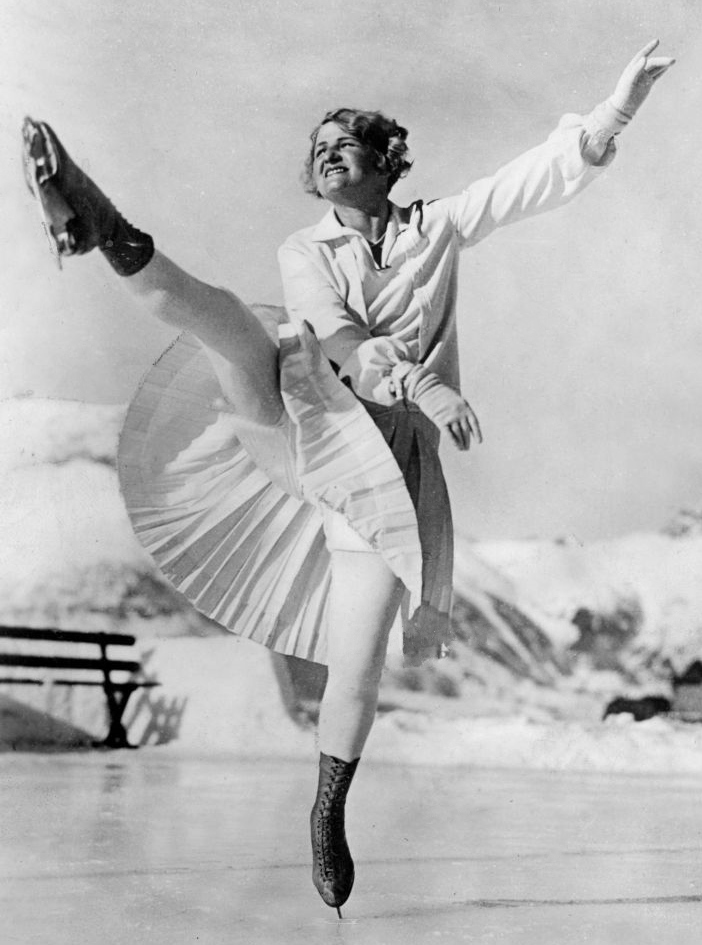
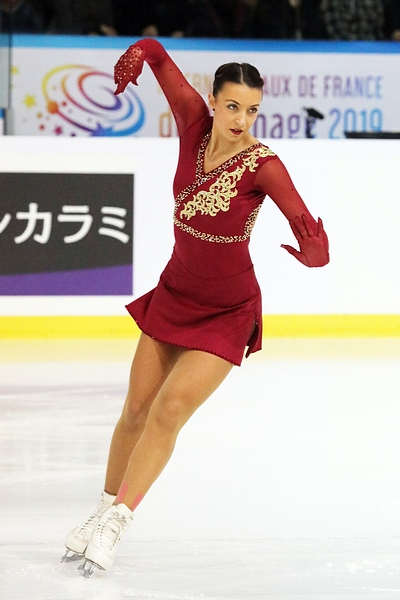
From left to right: Ellen Brockhöft and Nicole Schott each won seven German Championship titles in women's singles.
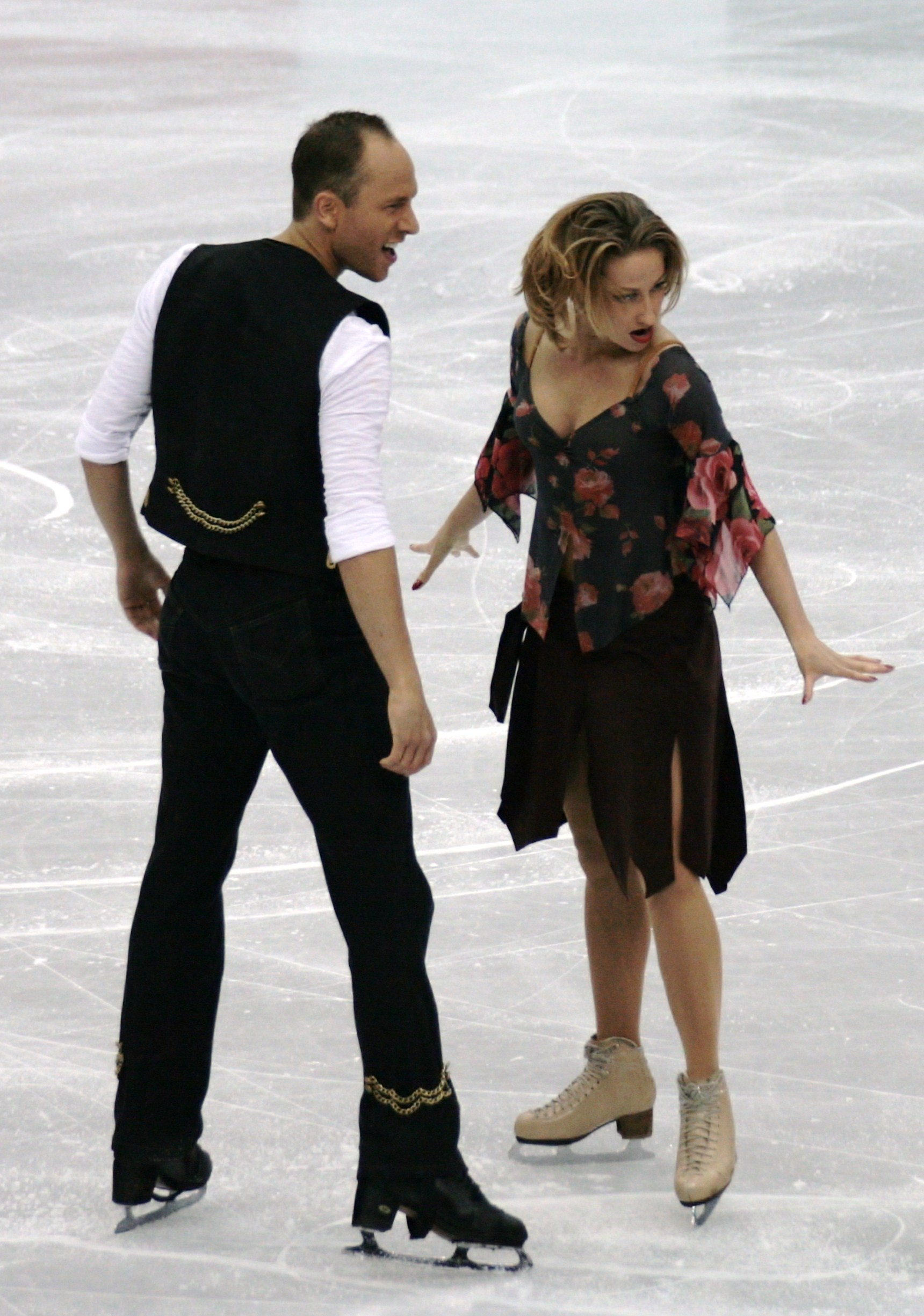
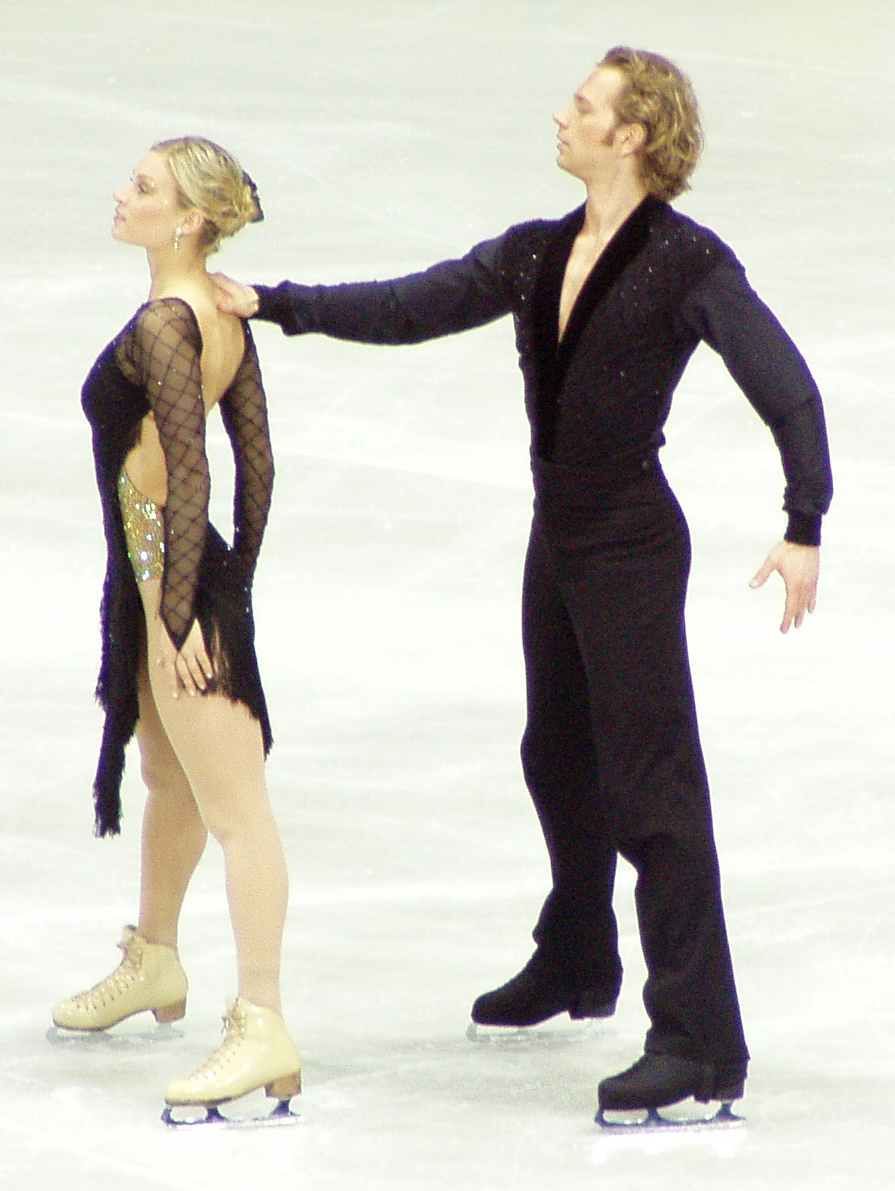
From left to right: Nelli Zhiganshina and Alexander Gazsi, and Kati Winkler and René Lohse, each won six German Championship titles in ice dance.

Records
Discipline	Most championship titles			
Discipline	Skater(s)	No.	Years	Ref.
Men's singles	Werner Rittberger	11	1911–13; 1920–26; 1928	
Women's singles	Ellen Brockhöft	7	1921; 1923–28	
Women's singles	Nicole Schott	7	2012; 2015; 2018–20; 2022–23	
Pairs	Aljona Savchenko; Robin Szolkowy	8	2004–09; 2011; 2014	
Pairs	Aljona Savchenko (Note: Aljona Savchenko won eight championship titles while partnered with Robin Szolkowy (2004–09, 2011, 2014), and two with Bruno Massot (2016, 2018).)	10	2004–09; 2011; 2014; 2016; 2018	
Ice dance	Angelika Buck; Erich Buck	6	1968–73	
Ice dance	Kati Winkler; René Lohse	6	1996; 1998–2000; 2003–04	
Ice dance	Nelli Zhiganshina; Alexander Gazsi	6	2007; 2011–15	
