= Ostermeier =

Ostermeier is a German surname. Notable people with this surname include:

- Garnet Ostermeier (born 1961), German figure skater
- Hans-Arno Ostermeier, German military officer
- Thomas Ostermeier (born 1968), German theatre director

== See also ==
- Ostermeyer
