= Riediger =

Riediger is a German surname. Notable people with the surname include:

- Hans-Jürgen Riediger (born 1955), East German footballer
- Karin Riediger (born 1961), German figure skater
