= Otto Weiß =

Otto Weiß (or Otto Weiss) may refer to:

- Otto Weiß (pilot) (1907–1955), German World War II Luftwaffe pilot and Knight's Cross recipient
- Otto Weiß (figure skater) (born 1914), German pair skater
