= Simone Lang =

German figure skater

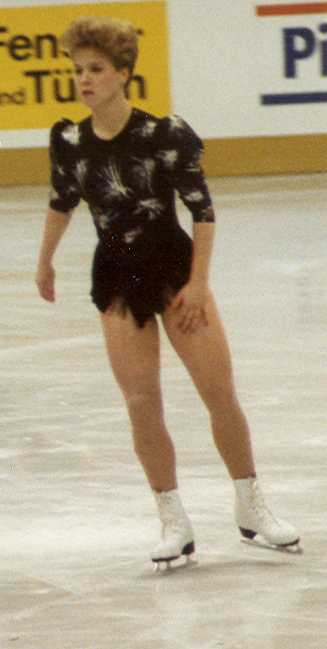
- Lang at the 1992 German Championships

Personal information
- Born: 30 April 1971 (age 55) Karl-Marx-Stadt, East Germany
- Height: 1.59 m (5 ft 2 1/2 in)

Figure skating career
- Country: Germany; East Germany
- Retired: 1995

Simone Lang (born 30 April 1971) is a German former figure skater. She is the 1989 Skate Canada International silver medalist, 1989 Skate America bronze medalist, and 1992 Nebelhorn Trophy champion. Lang achieved her highest ISU Championship placement, fourth, at the 1989 and 1992 European Championships. On the national level, she won three medals at the German Championships and one at the East German Championships.

Lang was coached by Jutta Müller in Chemnitz and later by Peter Jonas in Oberstdorf and Düsseldorf.

== Competitive highlights ==
International
Event	1985–86 (GDR)	1988–89 (GDR)	1989–90 (GDR)	1990–91 (GER)	1991–92 (GER)	1992–93 (GER)	1993–94 (GER)	1994–95 (GER)
Worlds		12th		13th				17th
Europeans		4th		9th	4th	10th		
Skate America			3rd					
Skate Canada			2nd					
Int. de Paris / Trophée de France				7th	9th	7th	4th	6th
Karl Schäfer	3rd							
Nebelhorn						1st		
Piruetten							7th	
Prague Skate		1st						
National
German				4th	3rd	2nd	4th	3rd
East German		2nd						
WD = Withdrew
