= Richard Zander =

German former competitive figure skater (born 1964)

Personal information
- Born: March 3, 1964 (age 62) Portland, Oregon, United States
- Height: 1.80 m (5 ft 11 in)

Figure skating career
- Country: West Germany
- Retired: 1990

Richard Zander (born March 3, 1964) is a German former competitive figure skater. He is a two-time German national champion.

Zander was born in Portland, Oregon, United States to German parents. In 1980, he moved to Germany to focus on figure skating training. He became German champion in 1987 and 1989. His coach was Karin Doherty. He represented the club EC Oberstdorf and competed at the 1988 Winter Olympics.

== Results ==
International
Event	81–82	82–83	83–84	84–85	85–86	86–87	87–88	88–89	89–90
Olympics							11th		
Worlds				11th	11th	9th			7th
Europeans				8th	9th	6th	5th	WD	5th
Nebelhorn			2nd						2nd
Prague Skate				2nd					
St. Gervais				2nd					
National
German Champ.	7th	9th	5th	2nd	2nd	1st	2nd	1st	2nd
WD = Withdrew
