= Eileen Zillmer =

German figure skater

Personal information
- Full name: Eileen Christina Zillmer
- Other names: Bibi Zillmer
- Born: December 15, 1952 (age 73) West Point, New York, USA

Figure skating career
- Country: West Germany
- Coach: Madeleine Zillmer
- Skating club: Augsburger Panther
- Retired: c. 1971

Eileen Christina "Bibi" Zillmer (born December 15, 1952) is a former competitive figure skater who represented West Germany for most of her career. She is a three-time (1969–71) national champion and competed at the 1968 Winter Olympics in Grenoble, France; Zillmer placed 12th in compulsory figures, 23rd in free skating, and 19th overall. She finished in the top ten at four ISU Championships – 1969 Worlds in Colorado Springs, Colorado, USA; 1969 Europeans in Garmisch-Partenkirchen, West Germany; 1970 Europeans in Leningrad, Soviet Union; and 1971 Europeans in Zürich, Switzerland.

Zillmer was born in West Point, New York, the daughter of Madeleine (née Mueller) and David Zillmer. She was coached by her mother. Her brother, Eric, competed in downhill skiing.

== Competitive highlights ==
International
Event	64–65 (USA)	66–67 (GER)	67–68 (GER)	68–69 (GER)	69–70 (GER)	70–71 (GER)
Winter Olympics			19th			
World Champ.				9th	15th	
European Champ.				10th	10th	9th
Prague Skate	9th					
National
German Champ.		2nd	2nd	1st	1st	1st
