= Gudrun Hauss =

German pair skater

Gudrun Hauss (born 17 April 1948 in Viersen) is a former West German pair skater. With partner Walter Häfner, she finished fourth at both the 1967 European Figure Skating Championships and World Figure Skating Championships. They finished eighth at the 1968 Winter Olympics and won the gold medal at the German Figure Skating Championships in 1969.

== Results ==
(with Häfner)

International
Event	64–65	65–66	66–67	67–68	68–69
Winter Olympics				8th	
World Championships		6th	4th	6th	7th
European Champ.	11th	6th	4th	6th	5th
Prague Skate			2nd		
National
West German Champ.		2nd		2nd	1st
