= Eva Prawitz =

German figure skater (1920–2023)

Eva Prawitz Faber (30 September 1920 – 14 August 2013) was a German pair skater and ice dancer. With partner Otto Weiß, she finished eighth at the 1936 Winter Olympics and won the gold medal at the German Figure Skating Championships in 1937. Prawitz later married fellow skater Horst Faber, and together they won the ice dancing championship at the 1950 German Nationals. Prawitz died on 14 August 2013, at the age of 92.

== Sources ==
- Evans, Hilary; Gjerde, Arild; Heijmans, Jeroen; Mallon, Bill; et al. "Eva Prawitz". Olympics at Sports-Reference.com. Sports Reference LLC. Archived from the original on 2020-04-17.
