= Rita Blumenberg =

German figure skater

Rita Blumenberg (born 23 June 1936) is a West German retired pair skater. With her husband Werner Mensching, she won the silver medal at the 1958 German Figure Skating Championships. The pair finished 7th at the 1960 Winter Olympics and 4th at the European Figure Skating Championships in 1961.

== Results ==
(with Mensching)

Event	1958	1959	1960	1961	1962
Winter Olympic Games			7th		
World Championships			9th		
European Championships		5th	11th	4th	9th
German Championships	2nd	3rd	3rd	3rd	3rd
