= Inge Paul =

German figure skater

Personal information
- Born: 19 September 1946 (age 79) Hamburg, Allied-occupied Germany
- Height: 1.60 m (5 ft 3 in)

Figure skating career
- Country: West Germany
- Skating club: SC Riessersee, Garmisch-Partenkirchen
- Retired: 1964

Inge Paul (born 19 September 1946) is a German former competitive figure skater who represented West Germany. She is the 1962 and 1964 national champion. Her best ISU Championship placement, 7th, came at the 1963 World Championships in Cortina d'Ampezzo and at the 1964 European Championships in Grenoble. At the 1964 Winter Olympics in Innsbruck, she placed 17th in compulsory figures, 12th in free skating, and 14th overall. She was a member of SC Riessersee.

== Competitive highlights ==
International
Event	1962	1963	1964
Winter Olympics			14th
World Championships		7th	14th
European Championships	18th		7th
National
German Championships	1st	2nd	1st
