= Hugo Winzer =

German pair skater

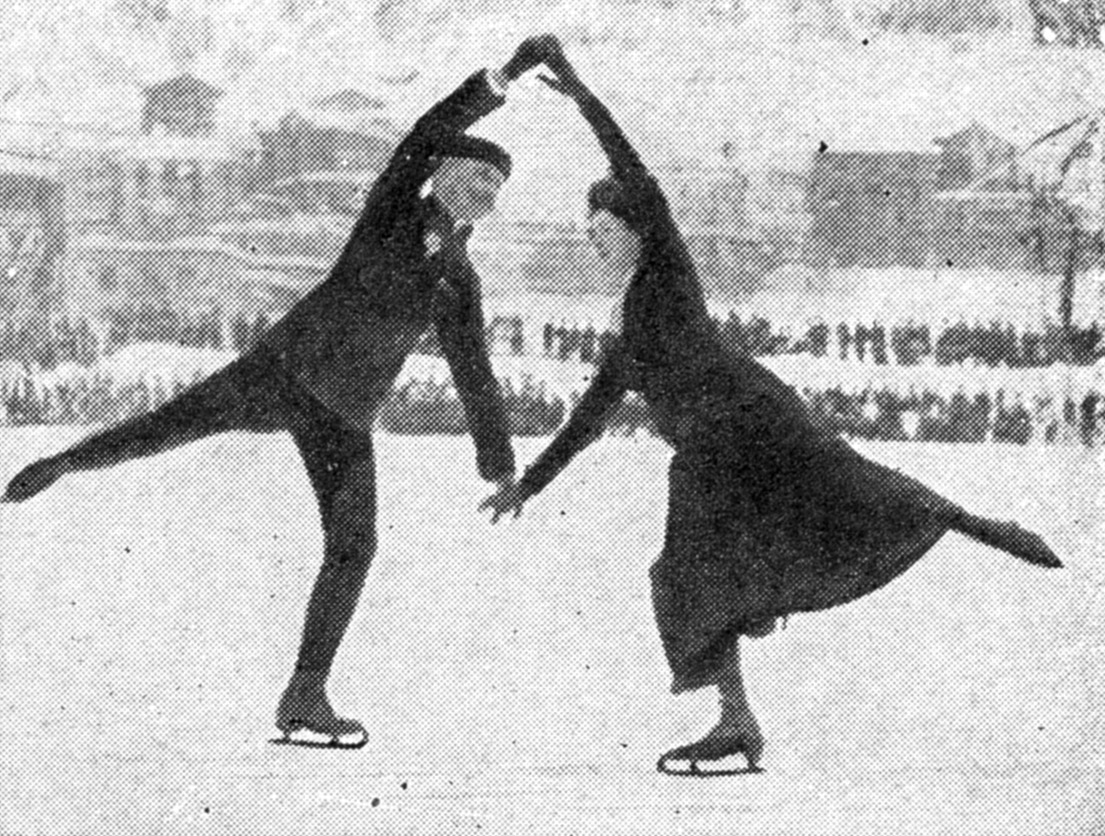
- Winzer skating with Hedwig Winzer
- Born: 1862
- Died: January 1937 (aged 74–75)

Figure skating career
- Country: Germany

Dr. Hugo Winzer (1862 – 13 January 1937 in Dresden) was a German pair skater. He was German pair champion in 1912 with his wife Hedwig Winzer.

Hugo Winzer stated skating 1886 in Leipzig inspired by the Finnish skater Neiglick. Hugo Winzer studied chemistry at the university in Leipzig at this time.

Due to a bad lung-illness he had to quit his job. To recover he moved to Switzerland where he also trained skating.

Dr. Hugo Winzer married Hedwig Müller from Berlin. They competed in pair skating also internationally.

After his skating career he became an international figure skating judge, so at the Worlds 1926. He also published articles about the "History of the German Figure Skating" (Handbuch der Leibesübungen Nr. 8, 1925)

== Results as a pair skater with Hedwig Winzer ==
Event	1912	1920	1925
World Championships	4th		
German Championships	1st	2nd	3rd
