= Inge Jell =

German figure skater

Inge Jell was a German figure skater. She won the 1947 German national senior title and two junior national titles. She was an international ice skating champion in her class at St. Moritz and twice won the medal of the King of Sweden. She placed tenth at the 1951 European Championships in Zurich, Switzerland. She performed in U.S. ice shows for two years and featured in various German shows.

She belonged to Münchner EV in Munich and SC Riessersee in Garmisch-Partenkirchen.

== Results ==
International
Event	1941	1942	1943	1944	1947	1951
World Championships						20th
European Championships						10th
National
German Championships	3rd	2nd	2nd	3rd	1st	
