= Julia Pfrengle =

German figure skater (born 1995)

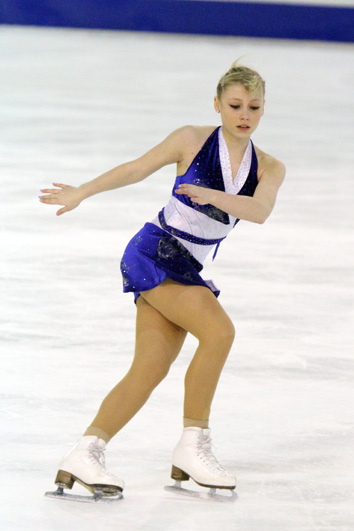

Personal information
- Full name: Julia Pfrengle
- Born: 10 May 1995 (age 31) Ludwigshafen, Germany
- Height: 1.54 m (5 ft 1/2 in)

Figure skating career
- Country: Germany
- Coach: Peter Sczypa; Claudia Leistner-Pfrengle
- Skating club: Mannheimer ERC

Julia Pfrengle (born 10 May 1995) is a German figure skater. She is the 2010 German bronze medalist and 2009 junior national champion. Her win in 2009 was her third consecutive national title, and her first at the junior level. She won the 2007 and 2008 German Novice Championships.

Pfrengle represents the Mannheimer ERC. She is the daughter of figure skaters Claudia Leistner and Stefan Pfrengle.

== Programs ==
Season	Short program	Free skating
2010–11	Mr. and Mrs. Smith by John Powell	Reflections on Earth by Gavin Greenaway
2009–10	The Out of Towners by Marc Shaiman	Kung Fu Panda by Hans Zimmer, John Powell

== Competitive highlights ==
Results
International
Event	2006–07	2007–08	2008–09	2009–10	2010–11	2011–12
Junior Worlds				10th		
JGP Austria					10th	
JGP Belarus				11th		
JGP Germany				8th	WD	
Heiko Fischer			2nd J.			
National
German Champ.	1st N.	1st N.	1st J.	3rd		5th
Levels: J. = Junior; N. = Novice; WD = Withdrew

== Detailed results ==
2010–11 season
Date	Event	Level	SP	FS	Total
15–19 September 2010	2010–11 ISU Junior Grand Prix, Austria	Junior	12; 40.41	9; 78.75	10; 119.16
2009–10 season
Date	Event	Level	SP	FS	Points
9–13 March 2009	2010 ISU World Junior Championships	Junior	11; 47.84	10; 85.21	10; 133.05
17–20 December 2009	2009 German Figure Skating Championships	Senior	2; 46.86	3; 84.38	3; 131.24
30 Sept. – 3 Oct. 2009	2009 ISU Junior Grand Prix, Germany	Junior	9; 39.78	5; 75.98	8; 115.76
23–26 September 2009	2009 ISU Junior Grand Prix, Belarus	Junior	9; 41.71	11; 65.37	11; 107.08
2008–09 season
Date	Event	Level	SP	FS	Points
18–22 December 2009	2009 German Figure Skating Championships	Junior	1; 48.12	1; 87.40	1; 135.52
