= Cornelia Tesch =

German figure skater

Figure skating career
- Country: West Germany
- Retired: 1986

Cornelia Tesch is a former competitive figure skater who represented West Germany. She is the 1982 World Junior silver medalist, a two-time Nebelhorn Trophy champion (1981, 1985), and a two-time German national silver medalist (1984 and 1986). Tesch competed at two European Championships — achieving her best result, tenth, in 1984 — and at the 1984 World Championships. She was coached by Karel Fajfr.

== Competitive highlights ==
International
Event	80–81	81–82	82–83	83–84	84–85	85–86
World Champ.				18th		
European Champ.				10th		12th
NHK Trophy			11th			
Nebelhorn Trophy		1st				1st
International: Junior
World Junior Champ.	5th	2nd				
National
German Champ.			3rd	2nd	3rd	2nd
