= Peter Krick =

German figure skater

Personal information
- Born: 31 January 1944 (age 82) Nieder-Weisel, Butzbach, Hesse, Germany
- Height: 1.80 m (5 ft 11 in)

Figure skating career
- Country: West Germany
- Retired: c. 1968

Peter Krick (born 31 January 1944) is a German former competitive figure skater who represented West Germany. He is a three-time (1966–68) national champion and finished in the top ten at seven ISU Championships – four Europeans and three Worlds. At the 1968 Winter Olympics in Grenoble, he placed seventh in the compulsory figures, 16th in the free skate, and 12th overall.

As of 2016, Krick serves as the International Skating Union's sport manager for figure skating. He is married to figure skating judge Sissy Krick.

== Competitive highlights ==
International
Event	60–61	61–62	62–63	63–64	64–65	65–66	66–67	67–68
Olympics								12th
World Champ.					9th		8th	8th
European Champ.	11th				7th	9th	8th	6th
Prague Skate					4th		2nd	
National
German Champ.		3rd			2nd	1st	1st	1st
