= Christiane Geras =

German retired figure skater (born 1987)

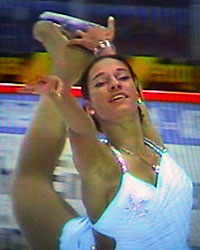
- Geras in December 2005

Personal information
- Other names: Christiane Berger
- Born: 3 April 1987 (age 39) Ludwigshafen, West Germany
- Home town: Mutterstadt, Germany
- Height: 1.62 m (5 ft 4 in)

Figure skating career
- Country: Germany
- Skating club: Mannheimer ERC
- Began skating: 1994
- Retired: 2007

Christiane Geras (née Berger; born 3 April 1987) is a German retired figure skater. She is the 2006–07 German national silver medalist and competed at four ISU Figure Skating Championships. Her best result was 14th at the 2001 World Junior Championships.

== Personal life ==
Christiane Geras was born in Ludwigshafen, Germany. Following her Abitur, she started studying dentistry at Goethe University Frankfurt in the autumn of 2006 and consequently graduated in 2011. After her graduation, she worked as a dentist and instructor at Carolinum Dental University Institute at Goethe University Frankfurt until her move to Canada in 2018. Christiane Geras is married. She resides and practices as a dentist in Cobourg, Ontario, Canada.

== Skating career ==
Geras started skating at the age of seven. She trained in Mannheim and represented the Mannheimer ERC.

Geras was selected to represent Germany at the 2001 World Junior Championships in Sofia, Bulgaria; she reached the free skate and finished 14th overall. She was eliminated after the qualifying round at the 2002 World Junior Championships in Hamar, Norway.

Geras was off the ice for half a year in 2003 due to a broken foot. She was coached by Peter Sczypa until 2004, when she switched to Karin Stephan. In the 2004–05 season, she won her first senior national medal, bronze, and took silver the next two years. In 2007, she was sent to the European Championships in Warsaw, Poland. Ranked 17th in the short program, she qualified for the free skate and finished 20th overall.

Geras had to sit out the 2007–08 season due to a broken ankle that required surgery. Due to her injury, Christiane Geras had to end her professional figure skating career.

== Programs ==
Season	Short program	Free skating	Exhibition
2006–2007	Concierto de Aranjuez by Joaquín Rodrigo	Forrest Gump by Alan Silvestri	
2005–2006	Heartbreak Hotel by Elvis Presley	Forrest Gump by Alan Silvestri	I Will Always Love You by Whitney Houston
2004–2005	Heartbreak Hotel by Elvis Presley		
2001–2002	Out of Time by Leviation	Beyond Silence German: Jenseits der Stille by Niki Reiser	
2000–2001	42nd Street (musical) by Harry Warren	Robin Hood: Prince of Thieves by Michael Kamen, performed by the Greater Los Angeles Orchestra	

== Competitive highlights ==
JGP: Junior Grand Prix

International
Event	2000–01	2001–02	2002–03	2003–04	2004–05	2005–06	2006–07
European Champ.							20th
Golden Spin						8th	
Nebelhorn Trophy			5th				
Schäfer Memorial					7th		
Fischer Pokal		1st		6th	1st	1st	
International: Junior
World Junior Champ.	14th	34th				27th	
JGP Canada			5th				
JGP Croatia						8th	
JGP Germany	6th		8th		14th		
Dragon Trophy						8th J.	
National
German Champ.	7th	7th		6th	3rd	2nd	2nd
J. = Junior level
