= Ellen Brockhöft =

German figure skater (1893–1977)

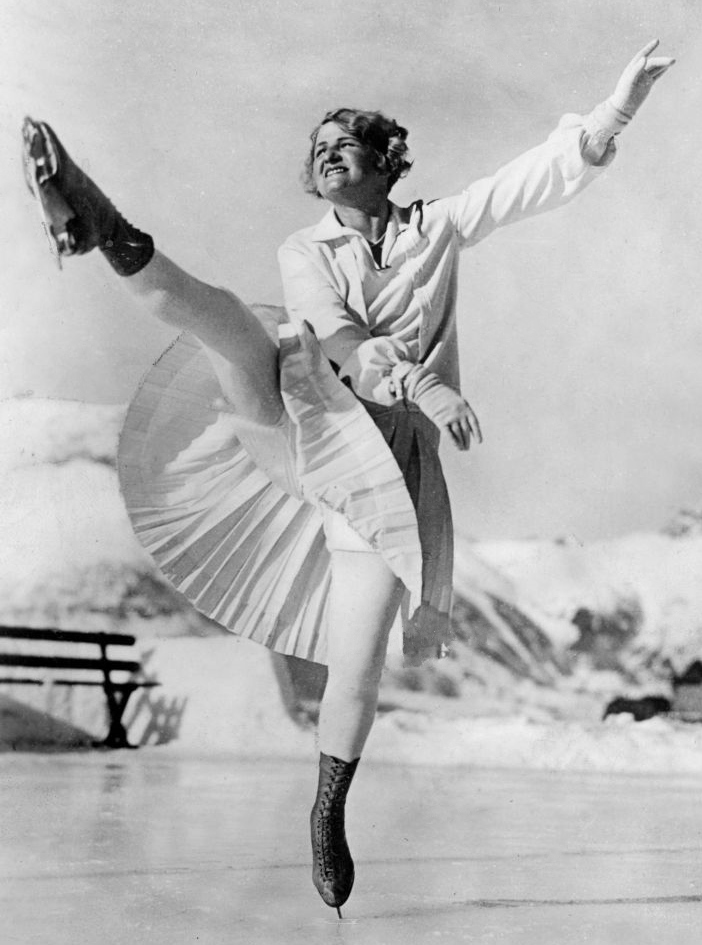

Personal information
- Other names: Rehra
- Born: 29 April 1893 Berlin, German Empire
- Died: 19 December 1977 (aged 82) Bonn, West Germany

Figure skating career
- Country: Germany
- Skating club: Berliner Schlittschuhclub
- Retired: 1929
Medal record
Representing Germany
Figure skating
World Championships
Silver medal – second place	1924 Oslo	Ladies' singles
Silver medal – second place	1925 Davos	Ladies' singles

Ellen Brockhöft (née Rehra; 29 April 1893 – 19 December 1977) was a German figure skater. Competing in ladies' singles, she was a two-time world silver medalist and a seven-time German national champion. She represented Germany at the 1928 Winter Olympics and finished ninth. Brockhöft was a member of Berliner Schlittschuhclub. During her skating career she claimed to be younger than her real age, believing this would help her career. She retired from amateur sport in 1929 and became a coach in St. Moritz.

== Results ==
International
Event	1920	1921	1922	1923	1924	1925	1926	1927	1928
Winter Olympics									9th
World Champ.					2nd	2nd		4th	
National
German Champ.	2nd	1st	2nd	1st	1st	1st	1st	1st	1st
