= Elisabeth Böckel =

German figure skater

Figure skating career
- Country: Germany
Medal record
Representing Germany
Ladies' figure skating
World Championships
Bronze medal – third place	1925 Davos	Ladies

Elisabeth Böckel was a German figure skater who competed in ladies' singles and pair skating.

She won the bronze medal in ladies' single skating at the 1925 World Figure Skating Championships.

== Competitive highlights ==
=== Ladies' singles ===
Event	1919	1920	1921	1922	1923	1924	1925	1926	1927
World Championships							3rd	4th	
German Championships	3rd	3rd	2nd		2nd		2nd		2nd

=== Pairs ===
With Otto Hayek

Event	1931
World Championships	9th
