= Klaus Grimmelt =

German former figure skater (born 1948)

Personal information
- Born: 11 April 1948 (age 78) Ratingen, Allied-occupied Germany

Figure skating career
- Country: West Germany
- Skating club: Düsseldorfer EG

Klaus Grimmelt (born 11 April 1948) is a German former figure skater who represented West Germany. He is the 1970 Nebelhorn Trophy champion and a two-time (1970–71) national champion. He represented his country at three World and three European Championships, achieving his best placement, 13th, at Europeans in 1969 (Garmisch-Partenkirchen) and 1971 (Zurich). Grimmelt was a member of Düsseldorfer Eislaufgemeinschaft.

== Competitive highlights ==
Event	64–65	67–68	68–69	69–70	70–71
World Championships			17th	17th	19th
European Championships			13th	14th	13th
Nebelhorn Trophy				3rd	1st
Prague Skate	6th				1st
German Championships		3rd	2nd	1st	1st
