= Sven Authorsen =

German former competitive ice dancer

Personal information
- Born: 5 June 1967 (age 59) Gütersloh, North Rhine-Westphalia, West Germany

Figure skating career
- Country: Germany
- Retired: 1995

Sven Authorsen (born 5 June 1967) is a German former competitive ice dancer. With Saskia Stähler, he is a two-time German national champion (1990–91). They qualified for the free dance at two European Championships, placing as high as 13th (1991), and also at the 1991 World Championships. Authorsen later competed with Yvonne Schulz.

Authorsen is a specialist in orthopedics and trauma surgery and has worked for the Deutsche Eislauf-Union.

== Competitive highlights ==
=== With Schulz ===
International
Event	1992–93	1993–94	1994–95
European Championships		19th	
Czech Skate			3rd
National
German Championships	3rd	2nd	3rd

=== With Stähler ===
Results
International
Event	1988–89	1989–90	1990–91
World Championships			19th
European Championships		16th	13th
Nations Cup			6th
National
German Championships	4th	1st	1st
