= Carola Wolff =

German former competitive figure skater

Figure skating career
- Country: West Germany
- Retired: c. 1991

Carola Wolff is a German former competitive figure skater who represented West Germany. She is the 1987 Nebelhorn Trophy silver medalist, the 1987 Novarat Trophy silver medalist, and a two-time German national bronze medalist. She finished in the top ten at the 1990 European Championships in Leningrad.

== Competitive highlights ==
International
Event	1987–88	1988–89	1989–90	1990–91
European Champ.			9th	
Nebelhorn Trophy	2nd			
NHK Trophy			4th	
Novarat Trophy	2nd			
Prague Skate		4th		
Skate America				11th
National
German Champ.	3rd		3rd	
