= Horst Faber =

German figure skater (1921–2022)

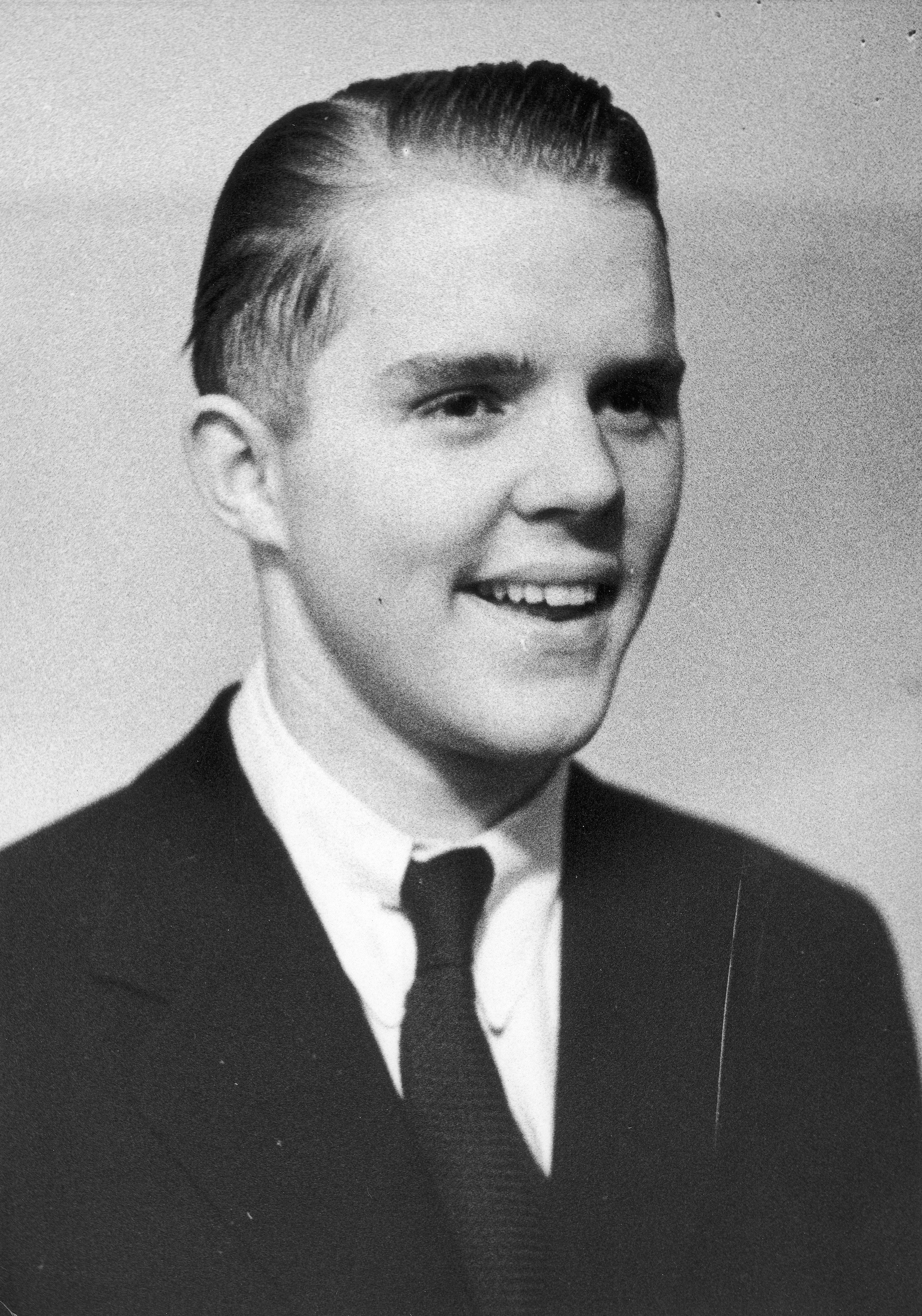
- Faber in 1939

Personal information
- Born: 9 November 1921
- Died: 4 December 2022 (aged 101)

Figure skating career
- Country: Germany
Medal record
Representing Germany
Men's Figure skating
World Championships
Bronze medal – third place	1939 Budapest	Men's singles
European Championships
Silver medal – second place	1951 Zürich	Men's singles
Bronze medal – third place	1939 Budapest	Men's singles

Horst Faber (9 November 1921 – 4 December 2022) was a German figure skater who competed in men's singles. He represented the SC Riessersee and was a nine-time German champion. His biggest accomplishment was winning the silver medal at the 1951 European Championships. Faber married fellow skater Eva Prawitz, and together they won the ice dancing championship at the 1950 German Nationals. Faber turned 100 in November 2021, and died on 4 December 2022, at the age of 101.

== Results ==
Event	1937	1938	1939	1940	1941	1942	1943	1944	1945	1946	1947	1948	1949	1950	1951
World Championships		4th	3rd												
European Championships	8th	4th	3rd												2nd
German Championships	3rd	3rd	1st	1st	1st		2nd	1st			1st	1st	1st	1st	1st

== Sources ==
- skatabase
