= Artur Vieregg =

German figure skater

Artur Vieregg was a German figure skater. After his skating career he continued to work also as a figure skating judge. He was lecturer at the “German College for Physical Exercises” (Deutsche Hochschule für Leibesübungen) in Berlin. He is author of the book “The Skater” (Der Eisläufer).

== Results ==
Event	1912	1920	1921	1922	1923	1924	1925	1926
World Championships					6th			
European Championships				8th		8th		8th
German Championships	2nd	3rd	3rd		3rd	3rd	3rd	3rd
