= Yvonne Schulz =

German ice dancer

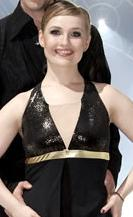

Personal information
- Born: 19 November 1974 (age 51) Forst, Bezirk Cottbus, East Germany

Figure skating career
- Country: Germany

Yvonne Schulz (born 19 November 1974) is a German former competitive ice dancer. She represented East Germany from 1988 to 1990 and the unified Germany from 1990 to 1995. Her most successful partnership was with Sven Authorsen, with whom she skated from 1992 until 1995. They qualified for the free dance at the 1994 European Championships, finishing 19th, and won the silver medal at the 1994 German Championships.

After retiring from competition, Schulz took an assistant coach position alongside Christina Henke-Mades in Dortmund. She also coached synchronised skating teams in Torvill and Dean's home rink, the National Ice Centre in Nottingham. She was with Nottingham Synchronised Skating Academy, (NSSA) for over a year, whilst living in Coventry with her husband and young daughter. She later returned to her hometown in Germany as she was homesick.

== Competitive highlights ==
International
Event	1992–93	1993–94	1994–95
European Championships		19th	
Czech Skate			3rd
National
German Championships	3rd	2nd	3rd
