= Otto Weiß (figure skater) =

German pair skater

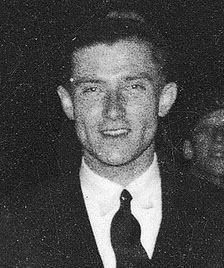
- Weiß in 1935
- Born: April 20, 1914

Figure skating career
- Country: Germany
- Discipline: Pair skating

Otto Weiß (born 20 April 1914, date of death unknown) was a German pair skater. Weiß became the German pair champion in 1932 and 1933 with his partner Wally Hempel. At their only major international competition, the 1935 World Championships, they were fourth. Weiß represented Germany at the 1936 Winter Olympics with a new partner, Eva Prawitz. Together, they were the German pair champions in 1937. In 1938, he competed with a third partner, Gisela Grätz, and placed 3rd at the German nationals. They went on to compete at the 1939 European Championships, where they were sixth.

== Competitive highlights ==
=== With Gisela Grätz ===
Event	1938	1939
European Championships		6
German Championships	3	

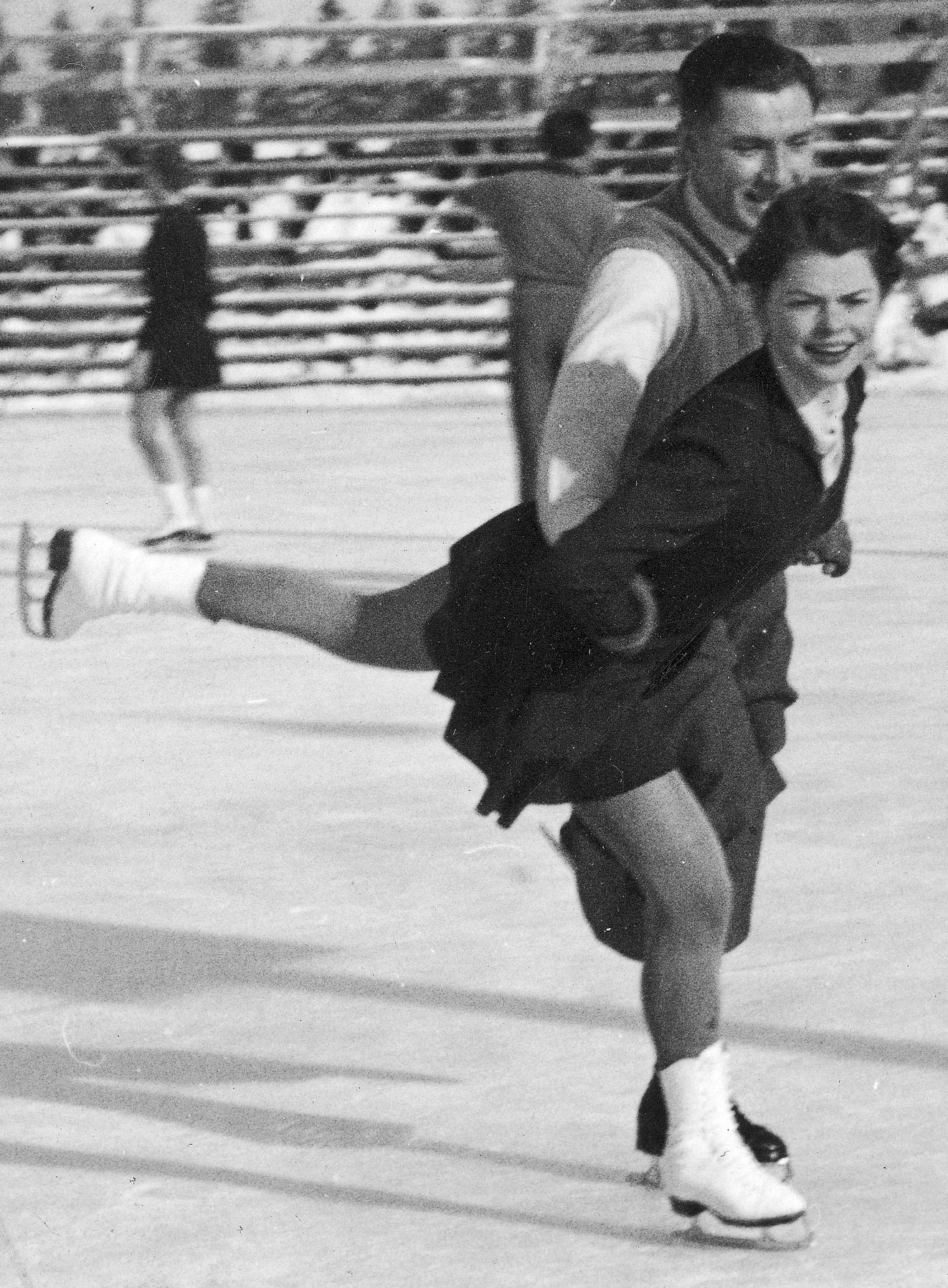
Weiß and Grätz at the 1939 European Championships

=== With Eva Prawitz ===
Event	1936	1937	1938
Olympic Winter Games	8		
World Championships			8
European Championships	4		
German Championships		1	

=== With Wally Hempel ===
Event	1932	1933	1934	1935
World Championships				4
German Championships	1	1		
