= Jürgen Eberwein =

German figure skater

Personal information
- Nationality: German
- Born: 10 November 1945 (age 79); Berlin, Germany

Sport
- Sport: Figure skating

Jürgen Eberwein (born 10 November 1945) is a German figure skater. He competed in the men's singles event at the 1968 Winter Olympics.
