= Garnet Ostermeier =

German figure skater

Personal information
- Other names: Garnet Fiordalisi
- Born: May 1961 (age 65)

Figure skating career
- Country: West Germany
- Skating club: Münchener EV

Garnet Ostermeier, later surname: Fiordalisi, (born in May 1961) is a German former competitive figure skater who represented West Germany. She is the 1976 World Junior silver medalist, 1976 Nebelhorn Trophy champion, and a two-time German national medalist. She was coached by Evy Scotvold, Carlo Fassi, and Frank Carroll. She lived in Santa Ana, California before joining Fassi in Denver, Colorado.

Fiordalisi coaches figure skating in southern California.

== Competitive highlights ==
International
Event	1975–76	1976–77	1977–78
World Champ.		14th	
European Champ.			14th
Nebelhorn Trophy		1st	
Prize of Moscow News	6th		
Skate Canada		3rd	
St. Gervais		1st	
International: Junior
World Junior Champ.	2nd		
National
West German Champ.		3rd	2nd
