= Ilse Kishauer =

German figure skater

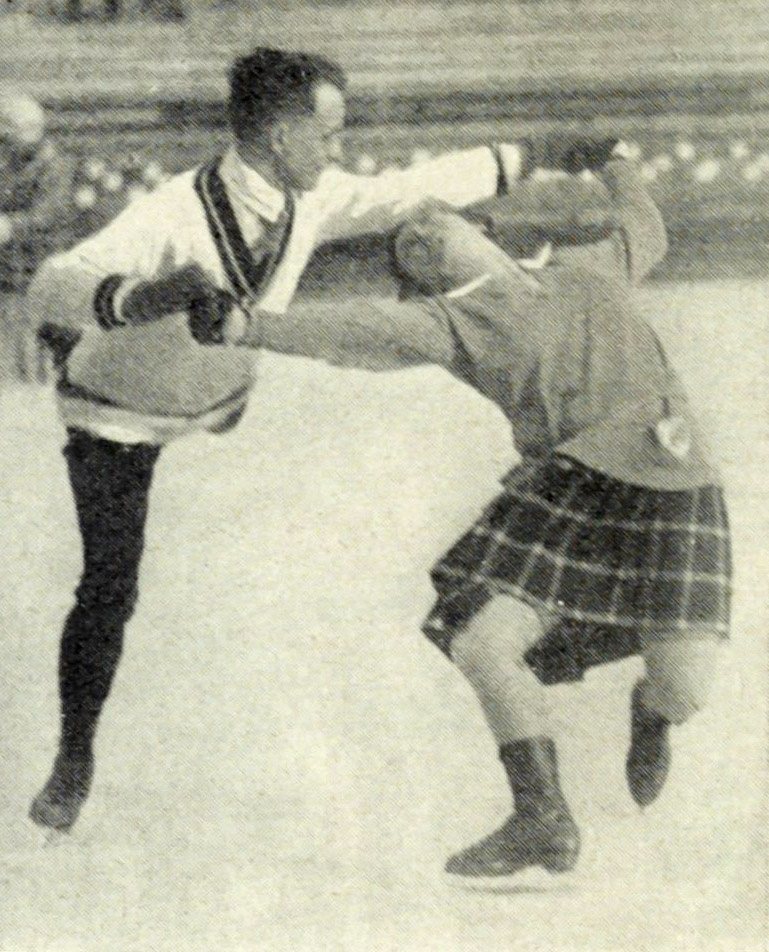

Personal information
- Born: Ilse Kishauer-Gaste Berlin, German Empire

Figure skating career
- Country: German Empire

Ilse Gaste (née Kishauer; 21 May 1906 – 25 September 1991) was a German figure skater. She competed in the mixed pairs event at the 1928 Winter Olympics.
