= Else Flebbe =

German figure skater

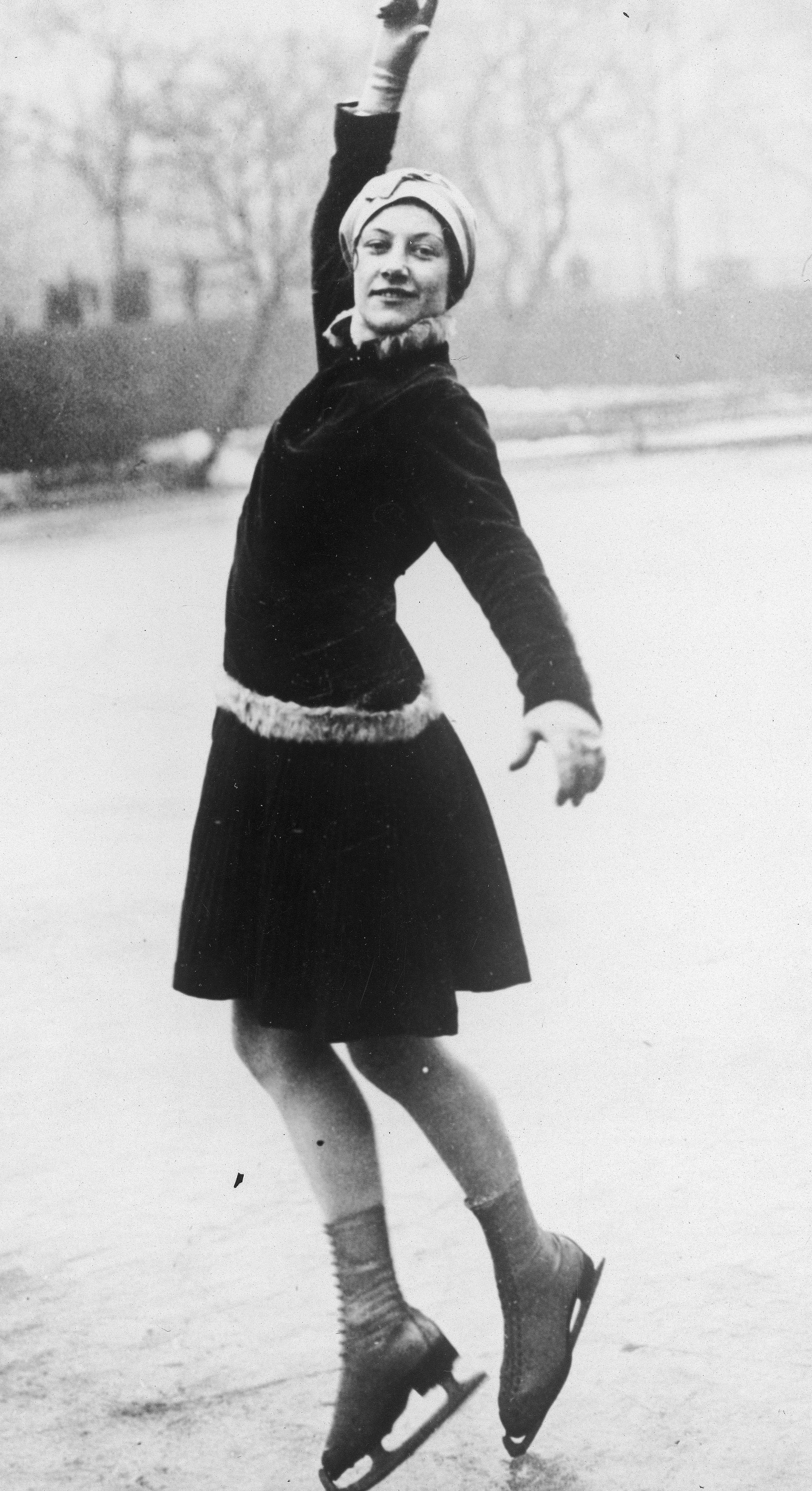

Figure skating career
- Country: Germany

Else Flebbe (born 13 June 1905, date of death unknown) was a German figure skater who competed in both singles and pair skating. She was the German pair national champion in 1924 with Rudolf Eilers. She later represented Germany in the women's singles event at the 1928 Winter Olympics. At her last international competition, the 1931 European Championships, she placed eighth.
