= Karin Riediger =

German figure skater

Personal information
- Full name: Karin Riediger-Heintges
- Born: 2 August 1961 (age 64) Duisburg, North Rhine-Westphalia, West Germany
- Height: 1.68 m (5 ft 6 in)

Figure skating career
- Country: West Germany
- Retired: 1984

Karin Riediger-Heintges (born 2 August 1961) is a German former figure skater. She is the 1981 West German national champion. Riediger placed as high as sixth at the European Championships (1979) and ninth at the World Championships (1981). She was selected to represent West Germany at the 1980 Winter Olympics and finished 13th. Her skating club was Duisburger SCK.

After retiring from competition, Riediger-Heintges became a coach at her former club, teaching young skaters. Her daughter, Isabel Heintges, was born in 1993.

== Results ==
International
Event	77–78	78–79	79–80	80–81	81–82	82–83	83–84
Olympics			13th				
Worlds	19th	15th	32nd	9th			
Europeans	12th	6th	9th	8th			
NHK Trophy			5th				
Nebelhorn	3rd		3rd				
Prague Skate	8th	2nd					
National
West German	3rd	2nd	2nd	1st	3rd		9th
