= Elaine Winter (figure skater) =

German figure skater

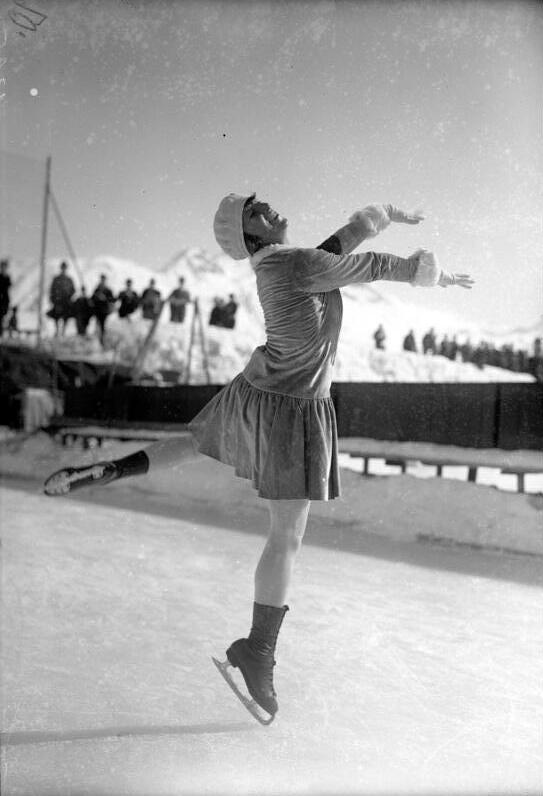
Elaine Winter in 1928

Elaine Winter (born 31 Dec 1895; died 22 October 1932) was a figure skater who competed for Germany at the 1928 Winter Olympics.
