= Ostermeyer =

Ostermeyer is a German surname. Notable people with the surname include:

- Elisabeth Ostermeyer (born 1929), German gymnast
- Kilasu Ostermeyer (born 1997), Thai-born German badminton player
- Micheline Ostermeyer (1922-2001), French athlete and concert pianist
- Peter Ostermeyer (born 1943), German chess master
