= 2008 German Figure Skating Championships =

- Type: National Championship
- Date: January 3 – 6
- Season: 2007–08
- Location: Dresden
- Venue: Freiberger Arena

Champions
- Men's singles: Clemens Brummer
- Women's singles: Sarah Hecken
- Pairs: Aljona Savchenko / Robin Szolkowy
- Ice dance: Christina Beier / William Beier
- Synchronized skating: Team Berlin 1
- Previous: 2007 German Championships
- Next: 2009 German Championships

The 2008 German Figure Skating Championships (German: Deutsche Meisterschaften im Eiskunstlaufen) took place on January 3–6, 2008 at the Freiberger Arena in Dresden. Skaters competed in the disciplines of men's singles, women's singles, pair skating, ice dance, and synchronized skating at the senior, junior, and novice levels.

The first senior compulsory dance was the Yankee Polka and the second was the Argentine Tango. The first junior compulsory dance was the Cha-Cha Congelado and the second was the Blues.

== Medalists ==
Senior
| Discipline | Gold | Silver | Bronze |
|---|---|---|---|
| Men | Clemens Brummer | Peter Liebers | Martin Liebers |
| Women | Sarah Hecken | Isabel Drescher | Annette Dytrt |
| Pairs | Aliona Savchenko / Robin Szolkowy | Mari-Doris Vartmann / Florian Just | Ekaterina Vasilieva / Daniel Wende |
| Ice dance | Christina Beier / William Beier | Nelli Zhiganshina / Alexander Gazsi | Carolina Hermann / Daniel Hermann |
| Synchronized skating | Team Berlin I | Magic Diamonds | United Angels |
Junior
| Discipline | Gold | Silver | Bronze |
| Men | Daniel Dotzauer | Patrick Stein | Christopher Berneck |
| Women | Briana Munoz | Nathalie Weinzierl | Bettina Bayer |
| Ice dance | Ashley Foy / Benjamin Blum | Jana Werner / Tim Giesen | Ekaterina Zabolotnaya / Julian Wagner |
| Synchronized skating | Team Berlin Junior | Skating Graces | No other competitors |

== Senior results ==
=== Men's singles ===
| Rank | Name | Total points | SP | | FS | |
|---|---|---|---|---|---|---|
| 1 | Clemens Brummer | 183.44 | 1 | 69.30 | 2 | 114.14 |
| 2 | Peter Liebers | 175.04 | 3 | 56.00 | 1 | 119.04 |
| 3 | Martin Liebers | 166.48 | 2 | 58.60 | 3 | 107.88 |
| 4 | Michael Biondi | 135.42 | 4 | 45.45 | 4 | 89.97 |
| 5 | Norman Keck | 124.49 | 5 | 39.57 | 5 | 84.92 |
| 6 | Ferenc Kassai | 99.39 | 6 | 35.70 | 6 | 63.69 |

=== Women's singles ===
| Rank | Name | Total points | SP | | FS | |
|---|---|---|---|---|---|---|
| 1 | Sarah Hecken | 134.28 | 7 | 41.42 | 1 | 92.86 |
| 2 | Isabel Drescher | 130.77 | 2 | 46.58 | 2 | 84.19 |
| 3 | Annette Dytrt | 129.25 | 1 | 51.82 | 5 | 77.43 |
| 4 | Kristin Wieczorek | 125.57 | 5 | 42.02 | 3 | 83.55 |
| 5 | Constanze Paulinus | 125.13 | 4 | 43.14 | 4 | 81.99 |
| 6 | Katharina Häcker | 121.26 | 3 | 43.94 | 6 | 77.32 |
| 7 | Melanie Schäffer | 112.23 | 9 | 37.46 | 7 | 74.77 |
| 8 | Jessica Hujsl | 106.03 | 10 | 37.18 | 8 | 68.85 |
| 9 | Katja Grohmann | 105.79 | 8 | 40.72 | 12 | 65.07 |
| 10 | Katharina Gierok | 104.72 | 11 | 37.12 | 10 | 67.60 |
| 11 | Mira Sonnenberg | 103.13 | 6 | 41.68 | 13 | 61.45 |
| 12 | Isabel Heintges | 102.79 | 12 | 36.38 | 11 | 66.41 |
| 13 | Anita Ruttkies | 102.30 | 13 | 34.66 | 9 | 67.64 |
| 14 | Laura Linde | 88.21 | 17 | 28.52 | 15 | 59.69 |
| 15 | Anne Sachtler | 85.06 | 19 | 24.48 | 14 | 60.58 |
| 16 | Jenny Pavlu | 82.80 | 14 | 30.84 | 18 | 51.96 |
| 17 | Desiree Löbel | 82.01 | 15 | 30.78 | 19 | 51.23 |
| 18 | Ina Seterbakken | 81.95 | 18 | 26.00 | 16 | 55.95 |
| 19 | Anissa Frank | 81.51 | 16 | 28.88 | 17 | 52.63 |

=== Pair skating ===
| Rank | Name | Total points | SP | | FS | |
|---|---|---|---|---|---|---|
| 1 | Aliona Savchenko / Robin Szolkowy | 214.67 | 1 | 77.98 | 1 | 136.69 |
| 2 | Mari-Doris Vartmann / Florian Just | 136.71 | 2 | 47.38 | 2 | 89.33 |
| 3 | Ekaterina Vasilieva / Daniel Wende | 113.54 | 3 | 42.98 | 3 | 70.56 |

=== Ice dance ===
| Rank | Name | Total points | CD1 | | CD2 | | OD | | FD | |
|---|---|---|---|---|---|---|---|---|---|---|
| 1 | Christina Beier / William Beier | 167.85 | 1 | 15.24 | 1 | 15.54 | 1 | 53.30 | 1 | 83.77 |
| 2 | Nelli Zhiganshina / Alexander Gazsi | 164.58 | 2 | 14.79 | 2 | 14.93 | 2 | 51.81 | 2 | 83.05 |
| 3 | Carolina Hermann / Daniel Hermann | 151.30 | 3 | 13.82 | 3 | 13.74 | 3 | 47.02 | 3 | 76.72 |

=== Synchronized skating ===
| Rank | Name | Total points | SP | | FS | |
|---|---|---|---|---|---|---|
| 1 | Team Berlin I | 203.07 | 1 | 71.74 | 1 | 131.33 |
| 2 | Magic Diamonds | 148.22 | 3 | 56.55 | 2 | 91.67 |
| 3 | United Angels | 147.92 | 2 | 56.70 | 3 | 91.22 |

== Junior results ==
=== Men's singles ===
| Rank | Name | Total points | SP | | FS | |
|---|---|---|---|---|---|---|
| 1 | Daniel Dotzauer | 133.76 | 1 | 48.80 | 4 | 84.96 |
| 2 | Patrick Stein | 133.68 | 2 | 44.65 | 1 | 89.03 |
| 3 | Christopher Berneck | 130.57 | 4 | 43.89 | 3 | 86.68 |
| 4 | Denis Wieczorek | 128.75 | 5 | 40.02 | 2 | 88.73 |
| 5 | Martin Rappe | 127.47 | 3 | 44.15 | 5 | 83.32 |
| 6 | Paul Fentz | 115.89 | 7 | 36.60 | 6 | 79.29 |
| 7 | Alexander Schöpke | 111.23 | 12 | 32.69 | 7 | 78.54 |
| 8 | Jurij Gnilozubov | 108.91 | 6 | 37.94 | 9 | 70.97 |
| 9 | Viktor Kremke | 107.08 | 8 | 34.25 | 8 | 72.83 |
| 10 | Nolan Seegert | 100.50 | 10 | 33.24 | 10 | 67.26 |
| 11 | Samuel Kießling | 99.94 | 9 | 33.90 | 11 | 66.04 |
| 12 | Imin Kurashvili | 90.54 | 11 | 32.93 | 12 | 57.61 |
| 13 | Konrad Hocker-Scholler | 84.98 | 14 | 27.51 | 13 | 57.47 |
| 14 | Peter Pfahl | 81.71 | 13 | 32.53 | 14 | 49.18 |

=== Women's singles ===
| Rank | Name | Total points | SP | | FS | |
|---|---|---|---|---|---|---|
| 1 | Briana Munoz | 114.01 | 4 | 39.22 | 1 | 74.79 |
| 2 | Nathalie Weinzierl | 113.82 | 1 | 45.46 | 4 | 68.36 |
| 3 | Bettina Bayer | 112.12 | 3 | 40.02 | 2 | 72.10 |
| 4 | Sandy Hoffmann | 108.61 | 5 | 38.52 | 3 | 70.09 |
| 5 | Nicole Gurny | 107.05 | 2 | 44.84 | 5 | 62.21 |
| 6 | Giulia Sanna | 93.70 | 6 | 35.08 | 6 | 58.62 |
| 7 | Jeanny-Ann Kaiser | 87.99 | 8 | 32.72 | 9 | 55.27 |
| 8 | Sandra Weigmann | 87.36 | 9 | 32.04 | 8 | 55.32 |
| 9 | Jacqueline Drange | 86.78 | 7 | 33.82 | 10 | 52.96 |
| 10 | Christina Kelasidou | 86.62 | 15 | 28.32 | 7 | 58.30 |
| 11 | Juliane Wagner | 81.42 | 10 | 31.28 | 12 | 50.14 |
| 12 | Julia Grünwald | 80.09 | 13 | 29.72 | 11 | 50.37 |
| 13 | Marielle Schuster | 80.02 | 11 | 30.88 | 14 | 49.14 |
| 14 | Stephanie Scholz | 77.86 | 14 | 29.40 | 15 | 48.46 |
| 15 | Aline Mai | 77.70 | 16 | 27.92 | 13 | 49.78 |
| 16 | Monique Szesny | 75.51 | 17 | 27.80 | 18 | 47.71 |
| 17 | Jessica Exner | 74.33 | 12 | 30.14 | 20 | 44.19 |
| 18 | Kristina Semjonow | 73.70 | 19 | 25.52 | 17 | 48.18 |
| 19 | Carolin Morlock | 71.65 | 22 | 23.32 | 16 | 48.33 |
| 20 | Diana Kurashvili | 68.23 | 20 | 25.30 | 21 | 42.93 |
| 21 | Tirza Imenkamp | 65.52 | 25 | 19.80 | 19 | 45.72 |
| 22 | Sharon Prinz | 63.74 | 21 | 25.26 | 24 | 38.48 |
| 23 | Christine Anstätt | 63.40 | 18 | 27.18 | 25 | 36.22 |
| 24 | Sonya Gonzales-Mier | 63.07 | 23 | 22.42 | 22 | 40.65 |
| 25 | Daniela Appiah | 60.87 | 24 | 20.68 | 23 | 40.19 |

=== Ice dance ===
| Rank | Name | Total points | CD1 | | CD2 | | OD | | FD | |
|---|---|---|---|---|---|---|---|---|---|---|
| 1 | Ashley Foy / Benjamin Blum | 147.36 | 1 | 14.71 | 1 | 15.18 | 1 | 48.58 | 1 | 68.89 |
| 2 | Jana Werner / Tim Giesen | 133.82 | 2 | 13.35 | 3 | 13.28 | 2 | 44.34 | 2 | 62.85 |
| 3 | Ekaterina Zabolotnaya / Julian Wagner | 129.70 | 3 | 12.64 | 2 | 13.45 | 3 | 42.88 | 3 | 60.73 |
| 4 | Juliane Haslinger / Tom Finke | 120.42 | 5 | 9.93 | 4 | 12.11 | 4 | 39.45 | 4 | 58.93 |
| 5 | Dominique Dieck / Timo König | 113.55 | 4 | 11.35 | 5 | 12.07 | 5 | 36.79 | 5 | 53.34 |

=== Synchronized skating ===
| Rank | Name | Club | Region | Total points | SP | | FS | |
|---|---|---|---|---|---|---|---|---|
| 1 | Team Berlin Junior | BTSC | BER | 155.68 | 1 | 62.55 | 1 | 93.13 |
| 2 | Skating Graces | USGC | SAS | 112.05 | 2 | 46.28 | 2 | 65.77 |
