= 2010 German Figure Skating Championships =

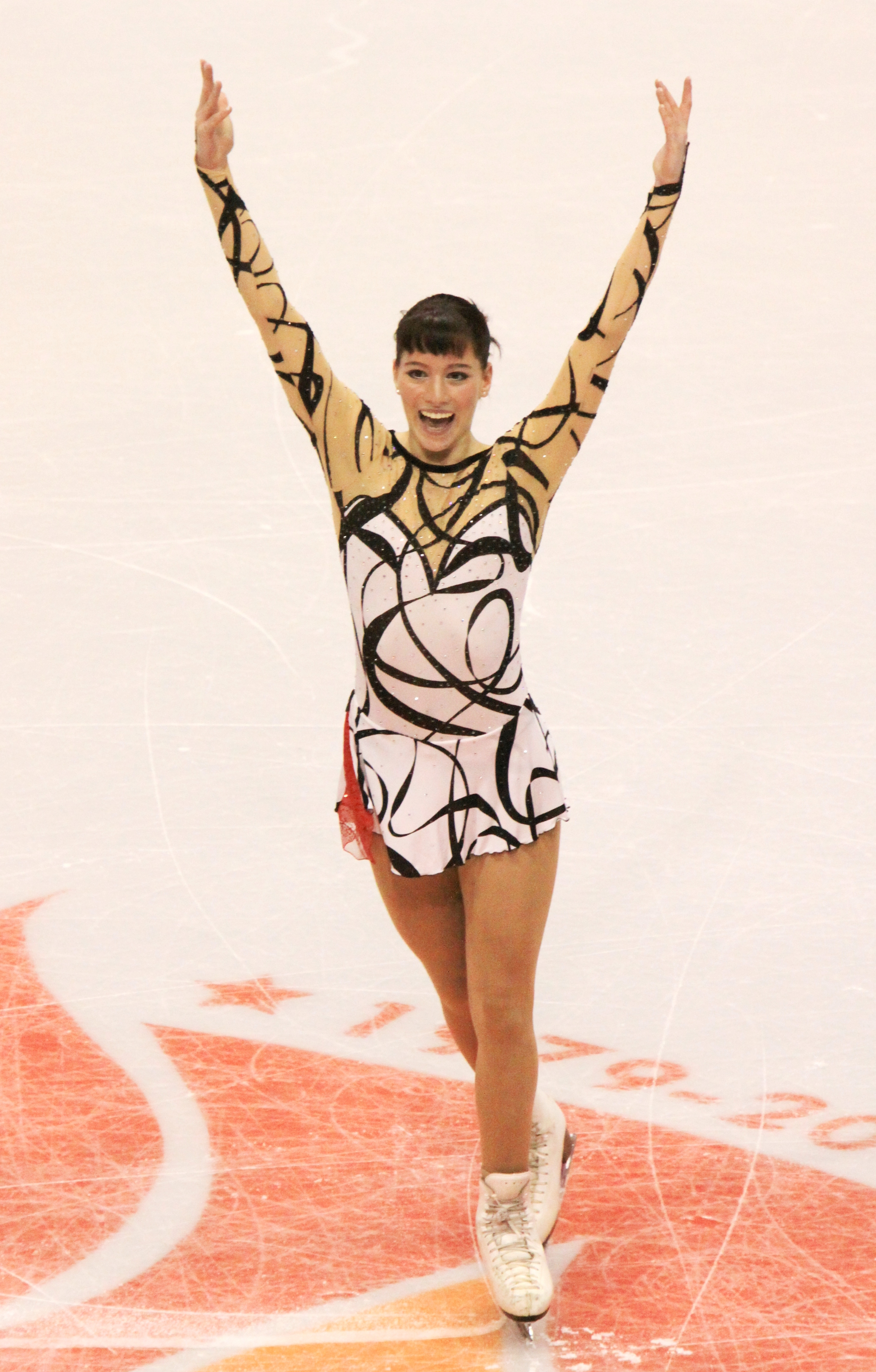
- Sarah Hecken ISU Senior Grand Prix ladies German Champion Figure Skating 2010 Deutsche Meisterin im Eiskunstlauf
- Type: National Championship
- Date: December 17 – 20, 2009
- Season: 2009–10
- Location: Mannheim
- Venue: SAP Arena
- Previous: 2009 German Championships
- Next: 2011 German Championships

The 2010 German Figure Skating Championships (German: Deutsche Meisterschaften im Eiskunstlaufen 2010) took place on December 17–20, 2009 at the SAP Arena in Mannheim. Skaters competed in the disciplines of men's singles, ladies' singles, pair skating, and ice dancing on the senior, junior, and novice levels. The results were among the criteria used to choose the German teams to the 2010 World Championships and the 2010 European Championships.

== Medalists ==
=== Senior level ===
Discipline	Gold	Silver	Bronze
Men	Stefan Lindemann	Peter Liebers	Daniel Dotzauer
Ladies	Sarah Hecken	Shira Willner	Julia Pfrengle
Pairs	Maylin Hausch / Daniel Wende	Nicole Gurny / Martin Liebers	No other competitors
Ice dancing	Christina Beier / William Beier	Carolina Hermann / Daniel Hermann	Nelli Zhiganshina / Alexander Gazsi

=== Junior level ===
Discipline	Gold	Silver	Bronze
Men	Martin Rappe	Alexander Schopke	Christopher Berneck
Ladies	Luisa Weber	Jessica Fussinger	Jennifer Urban
Pairs	Juliana Gurdzhi / Alexander Voller	Karolin Salatzki / Nolan Seegert	No other competitors
Ice dancing	Stefanie Frohberg / Tim Giesen	Dominique Dieck / Michael Zenkner	Shari Koch / Christian Nuchtern

== Senior results ==
=== Men's singles ===
Rank	Name	Total points	SP		FS	
1	Stefan Lindemann	184.47	3	64.19	1	120.28
2	Peter Liebers	182.75	1	65.50	2	117.25
3	Daniel Dotzauer	168.89	2	64.55	5	104.34
4	Philipp Tischendorf	166.74	6	55.17	4	111.57
5	Denis Wieczorek	164.41	9	50.63	3	113.78
6	Michael Biondi	154.60	4	57.85	8	96.75
7	Clemens Brummer	153.63	5	56.70	7	96.93
8	Paul Fentz	152.76	7	53.98	6	98.78
9	Franz Streubel	147.01	8	52.12	9	94.89
10	Norman Keck	125.28	10	43.62	11	81.66
11	Viktor Kremke	122.81	13	34.75	10	88.06
12	Imin Kurashvili	116.77	11	39.81	12	76.96
13	Samuel Kießling	93.71	12	35.63	13	58.08

=== Women's singles ===
Rank	Name	Total points	SP		FS	
1	Sarah Hecken	157.46	1	56.64	1	100.82
2	Shira Willner	134.29	3	45.82	2	88.47
3	Julia Pfrengle	131.24	2	46.86	3	84.38
4	Isabel Drescher	128.76	5	44.54	4	84.22
5	Katharina Häcker	122.03	7	40.84	5	81.19
6	Sandy Hoffmann	121.95	6	40.86	6	81.09
7	Nathalie Weinzierl	114.30	8	40.74	7	73.56
8	Katharina Gierok	107.33	4	45.04	8	62.29
9	Christina Erdel	99.21	9	38.90	9	60.31
10	Desiree Löbel	92.64	10	37.70	11	54.94
11	Christina Kelasidou	92.17	12	33.02	10	59.15
12	Giulia Sanna	76.66	13	24.80	12	51.86
WD	Caroline Gülke	WD	11	34.32	Withdrew from competition	

=== Pair skating ===
Rank	Name	Total points	SP		FS	
1	Maylin Hausch / Daniel Wende	147.16	1	51.86	1	95.30
2	Nicole Gurny / Martin Liebers	94.23	2	33.60	2	60.63

=== Ice dance ===
Rank	Name	Total points	CD		OD		FD	
1	Christina Beier / William Beier	169.65	1	32.14	1	53.43	1	84.08
2	Carolina Hermann / Daniel Hermann	160.01	2	30.19	2	47.51	2	82.31
3	Nelli Zhiganshina / Alexander Gazsi	148.72	4	27.09	3	45.80	3	75.83
WD	Tanja Kolbe / Sascha Rabe	WD	3	27.49	Withdrew from competition			

== Junior results ==
=== Men's singles ===
Rank	Name	Total points	SP		FS	
1	Martin Rappe	144.85	3	43.55	1	101.30
2	Alexander Schöpke	141.74	1	48.56	2	93.18
3	Christopher Berneck	130.62	2	44.49	3	86.13
4	Niko Ulanovsky	116.71	5	40.85	4	75.86
5	Anton Kempf	110.07	9	36.37	5	73.70
6	Panagiotis Polizoakis	107.18	4	41.48	11	65.70
7	Aljoscha Hadasch	106.31	8	36.76	8	69.55
8	Nolan Seegert	105.48	6	40.07	12	65.41
9	Alexander Lohmeyer	102.96	11	35.09	9	67.87
10	Matthias Hechler	102.51	15	32.81	7	69.70
11	Markus Ramisch	100.94	18	30.84	6	70.10
12	Maxim Stiefel	99.31	12	34.34	13	64.97
13	Ivan Aldinger	98.78	17	32.27	10	66.51
14	Timo Müller	98.60	7	38.10	15	60.50
15	Till-Felix Dehnen	98.54	10	35.45	14	63.09
16	Marco Asam	92.34	14	33.52	17	58.82
17	Waldemar Wolf	91.60	13	33.88	18	57.72
18	Vadim Prinz	91.14	19	30.73	16	60.41
19	Alexander Betke	90.16	16	32.45	19	57.71

=== Women's singles ===
Rank	Name	Total points	SP		FS	
1	Luisa Weber	118.13	1	44.92	2	73.21
2	Jessica Füssinger	113.96	6	36.48	1	77.48
3	Jennifer Urban	112.17	4	41.22	3	70.95
4	Monique Szesny	106.41	5	38.08	6	68.33
5	Petra Poschner	102.92	9	34.46	5	68.46
6	Katharina Zientek	101.79	14	32.66	4	69.13
7	Minami Dobashi	97.94	3	41.22	16	56.72
8	Nicole Schott	97.89	12	32.96	7	64.93
9	Kavita Lorenz	96.97	8	35.28	9	61.69
10	Anna-Katharina Kreisfeld	95.92	2	42.40	19	53.52
11	Carolin Riesenweber	95.58	10	34.24	10	61.34
12	Angelika Dubinski	95.45	22	30.90	8	64.55
13	Mareike Alexander	91.60	11	34.12	13	57.48
14	Tabatha Pace	89.77	16	31.80	12	57.97
15	Isabelle Glaser	89.22	7	35.54	18	53.68
16	Franziska Dumke	88.77	18	31.36	14	57.41
17	Carolin Glasmeier	88.12	24	29.98	11	58.14
18	Anne Zetzsche	86.77	27	29.38	15	57.39
19	Anneli Kawelke	86.19	15	31.80	17	54.39
20	Patricia Kühne	85.31	13	32.80	21	52.51
21	Juliette Höhn	84.45	17	31.54	20	52.91
22	Johanna Dunkel	83.31	21	30.98	22	52.33
23	Katja Bürgel	82.86	20	30.98	24	51.88
24	Jeanny-Ann Kaiser	81.92	26	29.72	23	52.20
25	Ariane Wittmann	78.57	28	28.08	25	50.49
26	Leonie Förschner	78.13	29	28.08	26	50.05
27	Kristina Semjonow	77.13	23	30.40	28	46.73
28	Marielle Schuster	76.06	33	26.58	27	49.48
29	Alexandra Schönekker	75.23	19	31.32	29	43.91
30	Victoria Schröter	69.28	32	26.88	30	42.40
31	Pia Chien	62.73	34	24.38	31	38.35
32	Katharina Helwert	62.71	30	27.74	32	34.97
33	Fabienne Drange	59.21	31	27.42	33	31.79
WD	Diane Basner	WD	25	29.94	Withdrew from competition	

=== Pair skating ===
Rank	Name	Total points	SP		FS	
1	Juliana Gurdzhi / Alexander Völler	119.04	1	43.14	1	75.90
2	Karolin Salatzki / Nolan Seegert	103.49	2	35.60	2	67.89

=== Ice dance ===
Rank	Name	Total points	CD		OD		FD	
1	Stefanie Frohberg / Tim Giesen	155.19	1	31.01	1	47.18	1	77.00
2	Dominique Dieck / Michael Zenkner	130.86	2	26.55	2	41.90	3	62.41
3	Shari Koch / Christian Nüchtern	128.63	3	25.67	4	39.78	2	63.18
4	Juliane Haslinger / Tom Finke	119.82	4	25.64	3	39.99	4	54.19
5	Charlene Gruner / Kevin Gassner	110.06	6	22.50	7	34.09	5	53.47
6	Kim Schiffner / Sean Basler	109.87	5	22.63	5	35.06	6	52.18
7	Kathrin Häuser / Sevan Lerche	105.34	8	20.48	6	34.35	8	50.51
8	Anika Vogel / Bennet Preis	105.09	7	20.88	8	32.64	7	51.57
9	Katharina Müller / Justin Gerke	90.33	9	20.03	9	32.13	9	38.17
