= 2009 German Figure Skating Championships =

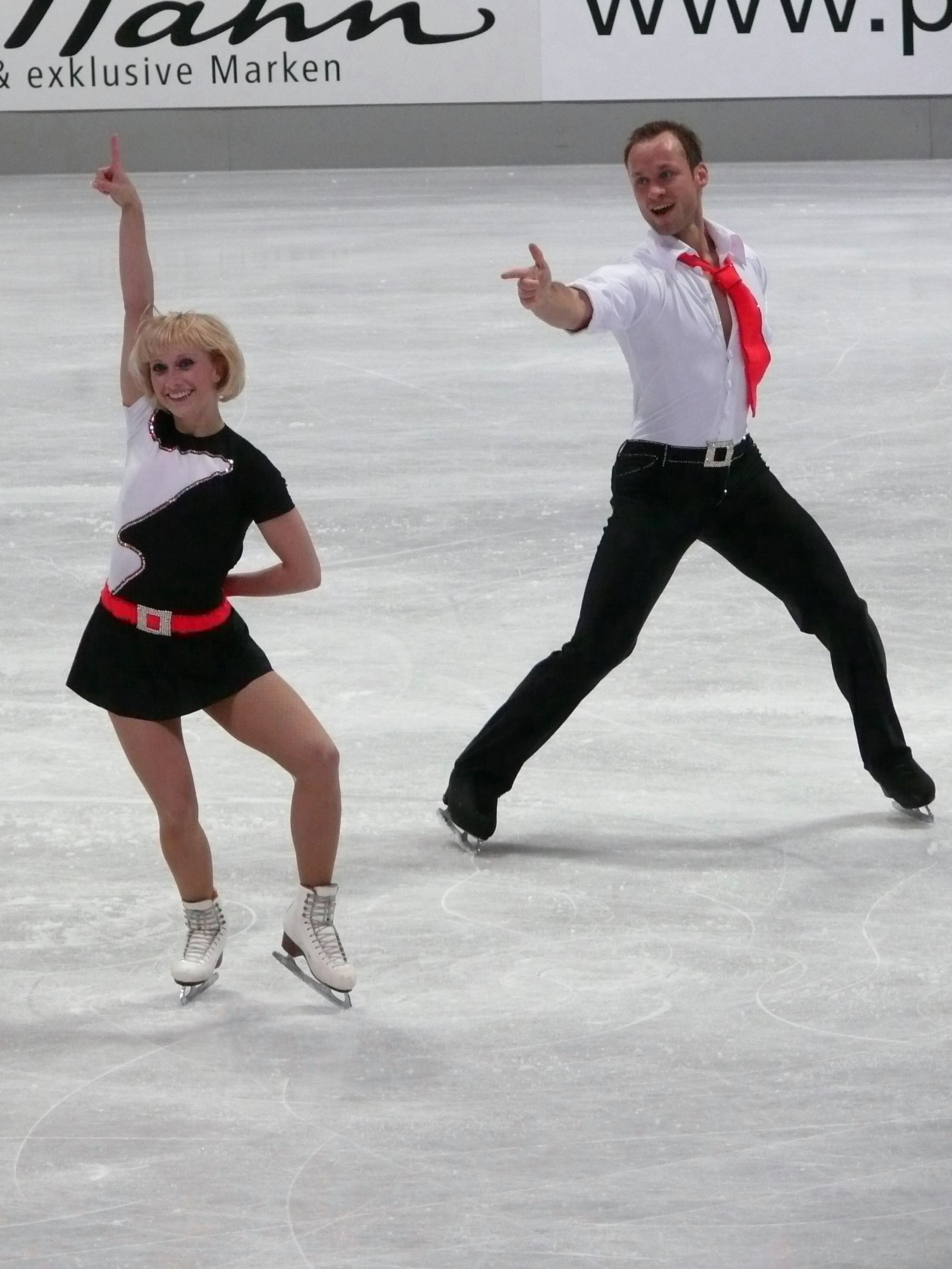
- HauschWende SP
- Type: National Championship
- Date: December 18 – 21, 2008
- Season: 2008–09
- Location: Oberstdorf
- Venue: Eissportzentrum Oberstdorf
- Previous: 2008 German Championships
- Next: 2010 German Championships

The 2009 German Figure Skating Championships (German: Deutsche Meisterschaften im Eiskunstlaufen) took place on December 18–21, 2008 at the Eissportzentrum Oberstdorf in Oberstdorf. Skaters competed in the disciplines of men's singles, ladies' singles, pair skating, ice dancing, and synchronized skating on the senior, junior, and novice levels.

== Medalists ==
=== Senior ===
Discipline	Gold	Silver	Bronze
Men	Peter Liebers	Clemens Brummer	Philipp Tischendorf
Ladies	Annette Dytrt	Constanze Paulinus	Caroline Gülke
Pairs	Aliona Savchenko / Robin Szolkowy	Maylin Hausch / Daniel Wende	Mari Vartmann / Florian Just
Ice dancing	Carolina Hermann / Daniel Hermann	Nelli Zhiganshina / Alexander Gazsi	Tanja Kolbe / Sascha Rabe
Synchronized	Team Berlin 1	United Angels	No other competitors

=== Junior ===
Discipline	Gold	Silver	Bronze
Men	Paul Fentz	Matti Landgraf	Denis Wieczorek
Ladies	Julia Pfrengle	Bettina Bayer	Josephine Klinger
Pairs	Juliana Gurdhzi / Alexander Voeller	Vanessa Schoeche / Andreas Mueller	No other competitors
Ice dancing	Dominique Dieck / Michael Zenkner	Shirleen Schoenfeld / Justin Gerke	Shari Koch / Christian Nuchtern
Synchronized	Team Berlin Junior	Skating Graces	No other competitors

== Senior results ==
=== Men's singles ===
Rank	Name	Total points	SP		FS	
1	Peter Liebers	207.78	1	70.35	1	137.43
2	Clemens Brummer	196.31	2	68.22	2	128.09
3	Philipp Tischendorf	187.17	3	63.70	3	123.47
4	Martin Liebers	180.59	4	63.11	4	117.48
5	Michael Biondi	149.08	6	50.65	5	98.43
6	Franz Streubel	148.64	5	52.55	6	96.09
7	Ferenc Kassai	133.52	7	49.01	7	84.51

=== Women's singles ===
Rank	Name	Total points	SP		FS	
1	Annette Dytrt	167.44	1	59.88	1	107.56
2	Constanze Paulinus	144.01	3	49.96	2	94.05
3	Caroline Gülke	130.47	4	49.28	3	81.19
4	Sarah Hecken	129.81	2	50.12	6	79.69
5	Isabel Drescher	125.32	7	45.06	4	80.26
6	Katharina Häcker	122.33	5	46.04	8	76.29
7	Isabel Heintges	121.08	8	40.94	5	80.14
8	Katharina Gierok	117.00	6	45.46	9	71.54
9	Sandy Hoffmann	114.53	11	37.06	7	77.47
10	Melanie Schäffer	108.41	10	37.50	10	70.91
11	Katja Grohmann	106.43	12	36.92	11	69.51
12	Christina Kelasidou	97.89	13	34.88	12	63.01
13	Nathalie Weinzierl	96.59	9	37.90	15	58.69
14	Brigitte Blickling	94.47	14	34.82	14	59.65
15	Jacqueline Drange	93.57	17	31.02	13	62.55
16	Desiree Löbel	84.81	16	33.22	16	51.59
17	Giulia Sanna	69.61	18	20.18	17	49.43
WD	Mira Sonnenberg	WD	15	34.42	Withdrew from competition	

=== Pair skating ===
Rank	Name	Total points	SP		FS	
1	Aliona Savchenko / Robin Szolkowy	197.20	1	72.68	1	124.52
2	Maylin Hausch / Daniel Wende	129.21	2	47.34	2	81.87
3	Mari-Doris Vartmann / Florian Just	100.75	3	36.62	3	64.13

=== Ice dance ===
Rank	Name	Total points	CD1		CD2		OD		FD	
1	Carolina Hermann / Daniel Hermann	166.70	2	14.13	2	15.95	1	52.87	1	83.75
2	Nelli Zhiganshina / Alexander Gazsi	159.86	1	14.60	1	15.96	2	50.04	2	79.26
3	Tanja Kolbe / Sascha Rabe	153.60	4	13.26	4	14.80	3	48.86	3	76.68
4	Christina Beier / Tim Giesen	151.16	3	13.31	3	15.07	4	47.34	4	75.44

=== Synchronized skating ===
Rank	Name	Club	Region	Total points	SP		FS	
1	Team Berlin I	BTSC	BER	182.99	1	67.71	1	115.28
2	United Angels	TUSS	B-W	175.45	2	63.33	2	112.12

== Junior results ==
=== Men's singles ===
Rank	Name	Total points	SP		FS	
1	Paul Fentz	156.92	3	51.06	2	105.86
2	Matti Landgraf	156.86	6	45.83	1	111.03
3	Denis Wieczorek	151.48	1	56.25	5	95.23
4	Daniel Dotzauer	148.16	5	46.95	3	101.21
5	Martin Rappe	143.20	2	53.55	6	89.65
6	Alexander Schöpke	142.13	7	45.59	4	96.54
7	Christopher Berneck	125.64	4	49.29	9	76.35
8	Viktor Kremke	118.71	13	36.03	7	82.68
9	Imin Kurashvili	116.96	10	40.54	8	76.42
10	Nolan Seegert	116.29	9	43.81	11	72.48
11	Aton Kempf	109.45	14	35.90	10	73.55
12	Maxim Stiefel	108.34	11	39.54	12	68.80
13	Panagiotis Polizoakis	104.79	8	44.95	14	59.84
14	Markus Ramisch	98.22	15	35.49	13	62.73
15	Matthias Hechler	97.75	12	38.11	15	59.64
16	Samuel Kießling	83.24	18	28.13	17	55.11
17	Waldemar Wolf	82.75	17	29.23	18	53.52
18	Ivan Aldinger	82.54	16	30.54	19	52.00
19	Konrad Hocker-Scholler	79.95	19	24.20	16	55.75

=== Women's singles ===
Rank	Name	Total points	SP		FS	
1	Julia Pfrengle	135.52	1	48.12	1	87.40
2	Bettina Bayer	109.38	6	40.86	3	68.52
3	Josephine Klinger	108.88	3	41.36	7	67.52
4	Nicole Gurny	108.54	5	40.90	6	67.64
5	Laura Lipp	107.03	8	38.84	5	68.19
6	Shira Willner	106.42	9	38.10	4	68.32
7	Christina Erdel	104.95	10	35.62	2	69.33
8	Minami Dobashi	103.38	7	39.62	9	63.76
9	Jennifer Urban	101.39	2	41.82	12	59.57
10	Luisa Weber	99.69	11	35.36	8	64.33
11	Marielle Schuster	96.91	14	34.84	10	62.07
12	Juliane Wagner	93.77	4	41.04	22	52.73
13	Anna-Katharina Kreisfeld	93.58	13	34.92	13	58.66
14	Anne Zetzsche	92.33	20	31.62	11	60.71
15	Carolin Riesenweber	89.80	12	35.16	19	54.64
16	Katharina Zientek	88.84	21	31.30	14	57.54
17	Diane Basner	88.82	15	33.24	16	55.58
18	Victoria Schröter	87.47	18	32.42	18	55.05
19	Monique Szesny	87.04	25	30.98	15	56.06
20	Katja Bürgel	86.43	22	31.26	17	55.17
21	Tirza-Alisha Imenkamp	85.59	19	32.42	20	53.17
22	Nicole Förster	83.89	23	31.08	21	52.81
23	Svenja Müller	83.74	17	32.62	24	51.12
24	Briana Munoz	82.47	16	33.18	27	49.29
25	Megan Troger	82.32	26	30.32	23	52.00
26	Aline Mai	80.77	24	31.00	26	49.77
27	Kristina Semjonow	78.97	27	29.16	25	49.81
28	Jeanny-Ann Kaiser	77.25	30	28.40	28	48.85
29	Ariane Wittmann	73.80	29	28.88	30	44.92
30	Julia Grünwald	72.04	31	24.82	29	47.22
31	Katharina Helwert	71.41	28	29.16	31	42.25

=== Pair skating ===
Rank	Name	Total points	SP		FS	
1	Juliana Gurdhzi / Alexander Voeller	107.14	1	40.26	1	66.88
2	Vanessa Schoeche / Andreas Mueller	92.92	2	37.08	2	55.84

=== Ice dance ===
Rank	Name	Total points	CD1		CD2		OD		FD	
1	Dominique Dieck / Michael Zenkner	131.48	2	13.47	2	13.55	1	40.71	1	63.75
2	Shirleen Schönfeld / Justin Gerke	114.49	3	11.85	3	11.99	4	34.78	2	55.87
3	Shari Koch / Christian Nüchtern	110.91	4	11.59	4	11.55	3	35.99	3	51.78
WD	Juliane Haslinger / Tom Finke	WD	1	14.14	1	14.13	2	36.11	Withdrew from competition	

=== Synchronized skating ===
Rank	Name	Total points	SP		FS	
1	Team Berlin Junior	154.98	1	58.59	1	96.39
2	Skating Graces	125.11	2	50.29	2	74.82
