= 2006 German Figure Skating Championships =

- Type: National Championship
- Date: December 27 – 30
- Season: 2005–06
- Location: Berlin
- Venue: LBZ Hohenschönhausen

Champions
- Men's singles: Stefan Lindemann
- Women's singles: Anette Dytrt
- Pairs: Aljona Savchenko / Robin Szolkowy
- Ice dance: Christina Beier / William Beier
- Synchronized skating: Team Berlin 1
- Previous: 2005 German Championships
- Next: 2007 German Championships

The 2006 German Figure Skating Championships (German: Deutsche Meisterschaften im Eiskunstlaufen) took place on December 27–30, 2005 at the LBZ Hohenschönhausen in Berlin. Skaters compete in the disciplines of men's singles, women's singles, pair skating, ice dance, and synchronized skating at the senior and junior levels.

The first senior compulsory dance was the Yankee Polka and the second was the Tango Romantica. The first junior compulsory dance was the Austrian Waltz and the second was the Quickstep.

== Medalists ==
Senior
Discipline	Gold	Silver	Bronze
Men	Stefan Lindemann	Silvio Smalun	Martin Liebers
Women	Annette Dytrt	Christiane Berger	Marietheres Huonker
Pairs	Aljona Savchenko / Robin Szolkowy	Rebecca Handke / Daniel Wende	Eva-Maria Fitze / Rico Rex
Ice dance	Christina Beier / William Beier	Judith Haunstetter / Arne Hönlein	Nailya Zhiganshina / Alexander Gazsi
Synchronized skating	Team Berlin I	United Angels	Skating Mystery
Junior
Discipline	Gold	Silver	Bronze
Men	Daniel Dotzauer	Michael Biondi	Alan Riefert
Women (Group I)	Nicole Scheck	Bettina Bayer	Ina Seterbakken
Women (Group II)	Katja Grohmann	Jessica Erdin	Annchristin Huonker
Pairs	Maylin Hausch / Steffen Hörmann	No other competitors	
Ice dance	Tanja Kolbe / Paul Boll	Carolina Hermann / Daniel Hermann	Ashley Foy / Benjamin Blum
Synchronized skating	Magic Diamonds	Silver Shadows	Saxony Ice Pearls

== Notes ==
- The competition had several guest skaters from Switzerland. They were: Jamal Othman (senior men) who placed 4th, Cindy Carquillat (senior ladies) who placed 10th, Leonie Krail / Oscar Peter (senior ice dancing) who placed 4th, Solene Pasztory / Andrew McCrary (junior ice dancing) who placed 6th, and Laurent Alvarez (junior men) who withdrew before the free skating. Because they were guest skaters, their results are not listed on the rank.

== Senior results ==
=== Men's singles ===
Rank	Name	Total points	SP		FS	
1	Stefan Lindemann	197.95	1	74.05	1	123.90
2	Silvio Smalun	180.34	2	60.84	2	119.50
3	Martin Liebers	173.82	4	58.10	3	115.72
	(Switzerland) Jamal Othman	163.33	7	49.85	4	113.48
4	Clemens Brummer	156.28	5	57.90	6	98.38
5	Peter Liebers	151.60	3	58.86	8	92.74
6	Philipp Tischendorf	148.85	6	49.85	5	99.00
7	Tobias Bayer	143.84	8	49.64	7	94.20
8	Norman Keck	130.92	12	45.08	9	85.84
9	Steffen Hörmann	130.80	11	46.00	10	84.80
10	Frederik Pauls	130.17	10	46.97	11	83.20
11	Marcel Kotzian	126.35	9	47.95	12	78.40
12	Julian Bäßler	106.70	13	38.28	13	68.42

=== Women's singles ===
Rank	Name	Total points	SP		FS	
1	Annette Dytrt	133.90	2	46.72	1	87.18
2	Christiane Berger	123.24	1	49.20	2	74.04
3	Marietheres Huonker	112.62	3	42.34	3	70.28
4	Sarah-Michelle Villanueva	108.04	5	38.54	4	69.50
5	Constanze Paulinus	101.62	4	39.54	6	62.08
6	Laura Linde	98.70	7	33.94	5	64.76
7	Denise Zimmermann	98.34	6	36.86	7	61.48
8	Kristin Wieczorek	94.42	8	33.70	8	60.72
9	Anita Schulz	90.36	10	31.88	10	58.48
	(Switzerland) Cindy Carquillat	88.94	12	28.34	9	60.60
10	Brigitte Blickling	87.22	9	33.36	12	53.86
11	Anne Sachtler	85.32	11	30.94	11	54.38
12	Kristina Geißler	77.48	13	23.90	13	53.58
13	Cornelia Beyermann	71.24	14	22.34	14	48.90

=== Pair skating ===
Rank	Name	Total points	SP		FS	
1	Aljona Savchenko / Robin Szolkowy	183.60	1	59.72	1	123.88
2	Rebecca Handke / Daniel Wende	135.48	2	46.44	2	89.04
3	Eva-Maria Fitze / Rico Rex	130.70	3	42.76	3	87.94
4	Mari-Doris Vartmann / Florian Just	113.64	4	40.90	4	72.74

=== Ice dance ===
Rank	Name	Total points	CD1		CD2		OD		FD	
1	Christina Beier / William Beier	167.66	1	16.07	1	16.77	1	50.73	1	84.09
2	Judith Haunstetter / Arne Hönlein	131.15	2	12.96	2	13.04	3	37.20	3	67.95
3	Nailya Zhiganshina / Alexander Gazsi	130.96	3	11.64	3	11.94	2	38.73	2	68.65
	(Switzerland) Leonie Krail / Oscar Peter	110.84	4	10.97	4	10.11	4	31.57	4	58.19

=== Synchronized skating ===
Rank	Name	Total points	SP		FS	
1	Team Berlin I	122.31	1	42.78	1	79.53
2	United Angels	100.08	2	36.87	2	63.21
3	Skating Mystery	94.66	3	35.67	3	58.99
4	Shooting Stars	89.93	4	32.68	4	57.25

== Junior results ==
=== Men ===
Rank	Name	Total points	SP		FS	
1	Daniel Dotzauer	120.98	3	38.22	1	82.76
2	Michael Biondi	112.66	1	41.36	2	71.30
3	Alan Riefert	107.24	2	40.76	6	66.48
4	Denis Wieczorek	105.42	6	34.68	3	70.74
5	Franz Streubel	103.60	5	36.44	5	67.16
6	Patrick Stein	103.18	4	37.00	7	66.18
7	Christopher Berneck	97.47	9	30.27	4	67.20
8	Ronny Petuchowski	92.09	7	32.03	8	60.06
9	Samuel Kiessling	83.11	8	30.95	10	52.16
10	Peter Pfahl	81.07	10	27.11	9	53.96
WD	(Switzerland) Laurent Alvarez	WD	11	26.04	Withdrew from competition	

=== Ladies A ===
Rank	Name	Total points	SP		FS	
1	Nicole Scheck	91.58	1	32.82	1	58.76
2	Bettina Bayer	89.34	4	31.90	2	57.44
3	Ina Seterbakken	83.16	2	32.12	3	51.04
4	Katharina Gierok	78.36	3	32.08	5	46.28
5	Cornelia Klukowski	73.54	8	25.42	4	48.12
6	Matea Wendt	73.46	6	27.80	6	45.66
7	Verena Mödl	68.80	9	24.90	8	43.90
8	Pia Holtsteger	67.32	5	27.92	11	39.40
9	Katharina-Bianca Krüger	67.20	13	23.00	7	44.20
10	Desiree Löbel	66.38	12	23.26	9	43.12
11	Viktoria Peters	65.96	10	24.54	10	41.42
12	Mira Sonnenberg	65.74	7	27.68	13	38.06
13	Jessica Hujsl	60.36	14	20.96	12	39.40
14	Nadine Al-Hasaki	53.60	15	16.44	14	37.16
WD	Melanie Schäffer	WD	11	23.62	Withdrew form competition	

=== Ladies B ===
Rank	Name	Total points	SP		FS	
1	Katja Grohmann	92.62	1	34.44	1	58.18
2	Jessica Erdin	89.00	2	33.36	2	55.64
3	Annchristin Huonker	79.10	5	28.48	4	50.62
4	Caroline Mey	78.80	11	25.24	3	53.56
5	Katharina Juranek	78.24	4	30.44	5	47.80
6	Anita Ruttkies	77.62	3	30.64	6	46.98
7	Annkathrin Löbel	74.20	6	28.18	8	46.02
8	Irmina Reithmair	73.54	8	27.82	9	45.72
9	Bea Burke	68.18	10	26.94	10	41.24
10	Erica Bleha	67.74	14	21.02	7	46.72
11	Anny-Kristin Knocke	65.88	9	27.00	11	38.88
12	Diana Kurashvili	61.00	12	23.92	14	37.08
13	Sara Lumnitz	60.52	13	22.06	13	38.46
14	Gloria Drebes	54.20	15	15.72	12	38.48
WD	Alina Zetzsche	WD	7	28.12	Withdrew from competition	

=== Pairs ===
Rank	Name	Total points	SP		FS	
1	Maylin Hausch / Steffen Hörmann	84.57	1	30.27	1	54.30

=== Ice dance ===
Rank	Name	Total points	CD1		CD2		OD		FD	
1	Tanja Kolbe / Paul Boll	127.89	3	12.13	1	13.84	1	43.45	2	58.47
2	Carolina Hermann / Daniel Hermann	127.75	2	12.14	2	13.59	2	43.24	1	58.78
3	Ashley Foy / Benjamin Blum	112.01	5	11.13	5	12.00	4	35.91	3	52.97
4	Saskia Brall / Tim Giesen	107.85	4	11.42	4	12.28	5	33.51	4	50.64
5	Ekaterina Zabolotnaya / Julian Wagner	96.79	6	10.97	6	11.23	7	28.20	5	46.39
	(Switzerland) Solene Pasztory / Andrew McCrary	90.83	7	8.64	7	10.07	6	29.13	6	42.99
WD	Rina Thieleke / Sascha Rabe	WD	1	12.62	3	13.04	3	37.98	Withdrew from competition	

=== Synchronized ===
Rank	Name	Total points	SP		FS	
1	Magic Diamonds	92.10	1	35.56	1	56.54
2	Silver Shadows	83.83	2	29.85	2	53.98
3	Saxony Ice Pearls	57.67	3	17.60	4	40.07
4	Skating Graces	55.55	4	14.57	3	40.98
5	Ice-Company	42.14	5	13.72	5	28.42
6	Eiskristalle 2000	30.77	6	12.75	6	18.02
