= 2011 German Figure Skating Championships =

- Type: National Championship
- Date: January 7–9, 2011
- Season: 2010–11
- Location: Oberstdorf
- Venue: iceDome Eissportzentrum Oberstdorf
- Previous: 2010 German Championships
- Next: 2012 German Championships

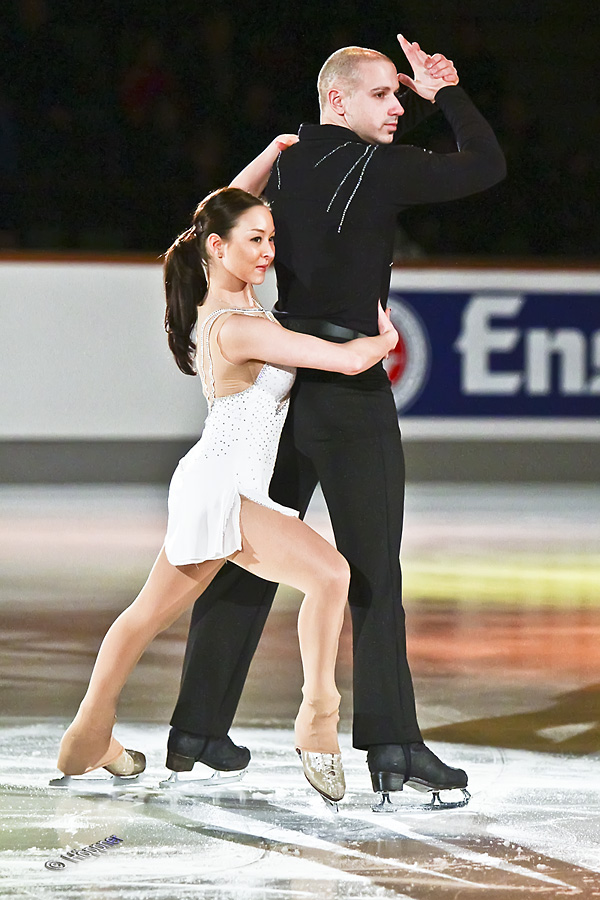
Mari-Doris Vartmann and Aaron Van Cleave during the 2011 German Figure Skating Championships

The 2011 German Figure Skating Championships (German: Deutsche Meisterschaften im Eiskunstlaufen 2011) took place on January 7–9, 2011 at the Eissportzentrum Oberstdorf in Oberstdorf. Skaters competed in the disciplines of men's singles, women's singles, pair skating, and ice dance at the senior, junior, and novice levels. The results were among the criteria used to choose the German teams to the 2011 World Championships and 2011 European Championships.

== Medalists ==
=== Senior ===
Discipline	Gold	Silver	Bronze
Men	Peter Liebers	Denis Wieczorek	Christopher Berneck
Ladies	Sarah Hecken	Katharina Häcker	Christina Erdel
Pairs	Aliona Savchenko / Robin Szolkowy	Mari Vartmann / Aaron Van Cleave	Katharina Gierok / Florian Just
Ice dancing	Nelli Zhiganshina / Alexander Gazsi	Stefanie Frohberg / Tim Giesen	Tanja Kolbe / Stefano Caruso

=== Junior ===
Discipline	Gold	Silver	Bronze
Men	Martin Rappe	Niko Ulanovsky	Maxim Stiefel
Ladies	Anne Zetzsche	Anna Baumgartel	Amani Fancy
Pairs	Linda Wenzig / Matti Landgraf	No other competitors	
Ice dancing	Shari Koch / Christian Nuchtern	Dominique Dieck / Michael Zenkner	Juliane Haslinger / Tom Finke

== Senior results ==
=== Men's singles ===
Rank	Name	Total points	SP		FS	
1	Peter Liebers	210.07	1	74.67	1	135.40
2	Denis Wieczorek	182.57	3	56.74	2	125.83
3	Christopher Berneck	169.25	5	54.73	3	114.52
4	Martin Liebers	162.12	2	57.54	5	104.58
5	Paul Fentz	158.82	6	54.56	6	104.26
6	Daniel Dotzauer	156.13	4	55.70	7	100.43
7	Franz Streubel	155.78	7	49.99	4	105.79
8	Viktor Kremke	127.53	8	45.86	8	81.67
9	Norman Keck	115.15	9	41.23	9	73.92
WD	Ivan Aldinger	WD	10	40.61	Withdrew from competition	

=== Women's singles ===
Rank	Name	Total points	SP		FS	
1	Sarah Hecken	149.11	1	52.63	2	96.48
2	Katharina Häcker	144.61	2	47.84	1	96.77
3	Christina Erdel	127.88	9	37.53	3	90.35
4	Jessica Füssinger	127.50	4	43.25	5	84.25
5	Constanze Paulinus	126.02	3	43.53	7	82.49
6	Nicole Schott	125.66	6	40.20	4	85.46
7	Isabel Drescher	125.10	5	40.98	6	84.12
8	Nathalie Weinzierl	113.19	8	39.52	8	73.67
9	Isabelle Glaser	110.15	7	39.94	9	70.21
10	Katharina Zientek	95.76	11	34.03	10	61.73
11	Kavita Lorenz	94.29	12	34.02	11	60.27
12	Luisa Weber	92.59	13	33.82	12	58.77
13	Jacqueline Drange	91.13	10	34.27	14	56.86
14	Anna-Katharina Kreifeld	89.76	15	32.26	13	57.50
15	Monique Szesny	88.15	14	33.75	18	54.40
16	Minami Dobashi	85.50	16	29.22	15	56.28
17	Katharina Helwert	83.44	18	27.88	16	55.56
18	Jennifer Urban	82.95	17	28.04	17	54.91

=== Pair skating ===
Rank	Name	Total points	SP		FS	
1	Aliona Savchenko / Robin Szolkowy	209.40	1	77.37	1	132.03
2	Mari Vartmann / Aaron Van Cleave	130.49	2	42.99	2	87.50
3	Katharina Gierok / Florian Just	126.16	3	41.57	3	84.59

=== Ice dance ===
Rank	Name	Total points	SD		FD	
1	Nelli Zhiganshina / Alexander Gazsi	150.23	1	60.79	1	89.44
2	Stefanie Frohberg / Tim Giesen	122.82	2	50.72	3	72.10
3	Tanja Kolbe / Stefano Caruso	122.53	3	49.73	2	72.80
