= 2007 German Figure Skating Championships =

- Type: National Championship
- Date: January 4 – 7
- Season: 2006–07
- Location: Oberstdorf
- Venue: Eislaufzentrum Oberstdorf

Champions
- Men's singles: Stefan Lindemann
- Women's singles: Kristin Wieczorek
- Pairs: Aljona Savchenko / Robin Szolkowy
- Ice dance: Nailya Zhiganshina / Alexander Gazsi
- Synchronized skating: Team Berlin 1
- Previous: 2006 German Championships
- Next: 2008 German Championships

The 2007 German Figure Skating Championships (German: Deutsche Meisterschaften im Eiskunstlaufen) took place on January 4–7, 2007 at the Eislaufzentrum Oberstdorf in Oberstdorf. Skaters competed in the disciplines of men's singles, ladies' singles, pair skating, ice dancing, and synchronized skating on the senior, junior, and novice levels.

The first senior compulsory dance was the Golden Waltz and the second was the Rhumba. The first junior compulsory dance was the Silver Samba and the second was the Midnight Blues.

== Medalists ==
Senior
Discipline	Gold	Silver	Bronze
Men	Stefan Lindemann	Philipp Tischendorf	Martin Liebers
Women	Kristin Wieczorek	Christiane Berger	Constanze Paulinus
Pairs	Aljona Savchenko / Robin Szolkowy	Mari-Doris Vartmann / Florian Just	No other competitors
Ice dance	Nailya Zhiganshina / Alexander Gazsi	No other competitors	
Synchronized skating	Team Berlin I	United Angels	Skating Mystery
Junior
Discipline	Gold	Silver	Bronze
Men	Daniel Dotzauer	Franz Streubel	Denis Wieczorek
Women (Group I)	Sarah Hecken	Isabel Drescher	Katharina Gierok
Women (Group II)	Jessica Kosuch	Jessica Hujsl	Caroline Mey
Ice dance	Carolina Hermann / Daniel Hermann	Tanja Kolbe / Sascha Rabe	Saskia Brall / Tim Giesen
Synchronized skating	Team Berlin Juniors	Magic Diamonds	Skating Graces

== Senior results ==
=== Men's singles ===
Rank	Name	Total points	SP		FS	
1	Stefan Lindemann	174.34	1	59.01	2	115.33
2	Philipp Tischendorf	174.09	2	55.27	1	118.82
3	Martin Liebers	163.42	5	52.10	3	111.32
4	Clemens Brummer	148.81	4	52.20	4	96.61
5	Tobias Bayer	136.38	6	50.63	5	85.75
6	Michael Biondi	129.72	3	53.87	9	75.85
7	Frederik Pauls	126.61	7	45.01	6	81.60
8	Julian Bäßler	119.11	8	39.18	7	79.93
9	Norman Keck	113.25	9	36.05	8	77.20

=== Women's singles ===
Rank	Name	Total points	SP		FS	
1	Kristin Wieczorek	137.12	1	50.26	1	86.86
2	Christiane Berger	123.65	2	47.31	3	76.34
3	Constanze Paulinus	122.79	4	41.00	2	81.79
4	Desiree Löbel	106.49	5	40.44	6	66.05
5	Brigitte Blickling	105.52	6	39.05	5	66.47
6	Katja Grohmann	105.13	7	37.69	4	67.44
7	Sarah-Michelle Villanueva	103.66	3	42.29	7	61.37
WD	Anne Sachtler		8	27.98		

=== Pair skating ===
Rank	Name	Total points	SP		FS	
1	Aljona Savchenko / Robin Szolkowy	190.53	1	72.37	1	118.16
2	Mari-Doris Vartmann / Florian Just	129.86	2	46.49	2	83.37

=== Ice dance ===
Rank	Name	Total points	CD1		CD2		OD		FD	
1	Nailya Zhiganshina / Alexander Gazsi	157.02	1	13.77	1	14.19	1	48.63	1	80.43

=== Synchronized skating ===
Rank	Name	Total points	SP		FS	
1	Team Berlin I	181.97	1	59.73	1	122.24
2	United Angels	148.52	2	51.66	2	96.86
3	Skating Mystery	120.15	3	41.72	4	78.43
4	Shooting Stars	113.27	5	34.04	3	79.23
–	(Switzerland) Cool Dreams	100.49	4	34.21	5	66.28

== Junior results ==
=== Men's singles ===
Rank	Name	Total points	SP		FS	
1	Daniel Dotzauer	137.02	1	52.37	2	84.65
2	Franz Streubel	131.17	5	39.15	1	92.02
3	Denis Wieczorek	114.69	2	40.32	5	74.37
4	Matti Landgraf	112.74	7	35.37	3	77.37
5	Patrick Stein	111.45	4	39.60	6	71.85
6	Christopher Berneck	108.80	8	34.32	4	74.48
7	Martin Rappe	107.64	3	40.29	7	67.35
8	Peter Pfahl	93.22	9	30.02	8	63.20
9	Jurij Gnilozoubov	92.86	6	35.65	9	57.21
10	Imin Kurashvili	76.37	10	26.19	10	50.18

=== Women's singles (Group I) ===
Rank	Name	Total points	SP		FS	
1	Sarah Hecken	125.95	1	41.67	1	84.28
2	Isabel Drescher	110.89	2	38.24	2	72.65
3	Katharina Gierok	105.62	3	36.02	3	69.60
4	Mira Sonnenberg	103.40	4	35.24	4	68.16
5	Cornelia Klukowski	97.74	6	34.44	5	63.30
6	Melanie Schäffer	97.14	5	34.83	7	62.31
7	Anissa Frank	92.37	10	29.81	6	62.56
8	Ina Seterbakken	90.66	7	32.06	9	58.60
9	Isabel Heintges	89.15	13	28.22	8	60.93
10	Giulia Sanna	86.76	8	31.65	10	55.11
11	Pia Holtsteger	83.14	9	30.84	12	52.30
12	Jeanny Ann Kaiser	81.67	12	28.86	11	52.81
13	Sharon Prinz	77.54	16	26.83	13	50.71
14	Marielle Schuster	76.60	11	29.20	14	47.40
15	Julia Peters	73.27	15	27.32	15	45.95
16	Ella Kiel	71.07	14	27.73	16	43.34

=== Women's singles (Group II) ===
Rank	Name	Total points	SP		FS	
1	Jessica Kosuch	91.24	1	37.67	2	53.57
2	Jessica Hujsl	90.76	2	33.17	1	57.59
3	Caroline Mey	82.11	4	31.07	3	51.04
4	Olga Hilkevitch	77.23	6	30.29	6	46.94
5	Anita Ruttkies	76.32	5	30.40	8	45.92
6	Jenny Pavlu	75.56	3	31.14	9	44.42
7	Verena Mödl	74.72	12	26.41	5	48.31
8	Diana Kurashvili	73.23	7	30.00	10	43.23
9	Christine Anstätt	72.68	8	29.69	11	42.99
10	Sandra Weigmann	71.51	17	23.04	4	48.47
11	Monique Szesny	71.27	15	24.86	7	46.41
12	Carolin Morlock	66.90	14	25.00	12	41.90
13	Annkathrin Löbel	66.52	9	28.14	13	38.38
14	Anny-Kristin Knocke	63.79	11	26.54	15	37.25
15	Stephanie Scholz	63.37	13	26.18	16	37.19
16	Franziska Eickenberg	63.15	10	28.08	17	35.07
17	Katharina Juranek	62.37	16	24.53	14	37.84

=== Ice dance ===
Rank	Name	Total points	CD1		CD2		OD		FD	
1	Carolina Hermann / Daniel Hermann	141.48	1	14.72	1	14.20	2	45.97	1	66.59
2	Tanja Kolbe / Sascha Rabe	140.16	2	13.88	2	13.93	1	47.02	2	65.33
3	Saskia Brall / Tim Giesen	126.23	3	12.84	3	12.74	4	40.28	3	60.37
4	Ashley Foy / Benjamin Blum	124.51	4	12.67	4	12.24	3	42.06	4	57.54
5	Ruth-Beatrice Lang / Michael Zenkner	98.53	5	10.82	5	9.62	5	31.68	5	46.41
6	Carolin Frenzel / Clemens Dialer	93.96	6	10.25	6	8.97	6	30.66	6	44.08

=== Synchronized skating ===
Rank	Name	Total points	SP		FS	
1	Team Berlin Juniors	139.89	2	49.22	1	90.67
2	Magic Diamonds	128.82	1	51.28	2	77.54
3	Skating Graces	95.15	3	34.23	3	60.92
4	Eiskristalle 2000	64.51	4	20.82	4	43.69
