= 2005 German Figure Skating Championships =

- Type: National Championship
- Date: January 6 – 9
- Season: 2004–05
- Location: Oberstdorf
- Venue: Eissportzentrum Oberstdorf

Champions
- Men's singles: Stefan Lindemann
- Women's singles: Anette Dytrt
- Pairs: Aljona Savchenko / Robin Szolkowy
- Ice dance: Christina Beier / William Beier
- Synchronized skating: Team Berlin 1
- Previous: 2004 German Championships
- Next: 2006 German Championships

The 2005 German Figure Skating Championships (German: Deutsche Meisterschaften im Eiskunstlaufen) took place on January 6–9, 2005 at the Eissportzentrum Oberstdorf in Oberstdorf. Skaters competed in the disciplines of men's singles, women's singles, pair skating, ice dance, and synchronized skating.

The first senior compulsory dance was the Golden Waltz and the second was the Midnight Blues.

== Results ==
=== Men's singles ===
Rank	Name	Total points	SP		FS	
1	Stefan Lindemann	215.18	1	78.47	1	136.71
2	Silvio Smalun	193.22	2	71.65	2	121.57
3	Martin Liebers	179.91	3	62.19	3	117.72
4	Clemens Brummer	167.44	4	58.69	4	108.75
5	Peter Liebers	161.33	6	54.86	5	106.47
6	Tobias Bayer	151.69	7	54.00	6	97.69
7	Radomir Soumar	142.98	5	55.49	8	87.49
8	Michael Ganser	134.89	9	45.09	7	89.80
9	Frederik Pauls	132.78	8	45.96	9	86.82
10	Steffen Hörmann	129.12	10	42.42	10	86.70
11	Marcel Kotzian	127.77	11	41.31	11	86.46
12	Frank Mauch	94.29	12	37.31	12	56.98

=== Women's singles ===
Rank	Name	Total points	SP		FS	
1	Annette Dytrt	152.72	2	54.00	1	98.72
2	Sarah-Michelle Villanueva	133.88	3	52.78	4	81.10
3	Christiane Berger	132.14	1	54.84	7	77.30
4	Denise Zimmermann	130.81	5	45.26	2	85.55
5	Kristin Wieczorek	128.46	6	43.79	3	84.67
6	Marietheres Huonker	121.95	7	41.28	5	80.67
7	Katharina Häcker	118.74	8	40.15	6	78.59
8	Cornelia Beyermann	99.05	9	37.38	10	61.67
9	Laura Linde	98.97	10	37.10	9	61.87
10	Kristina Beutelrock	95.95	11	33.40	8	62.55
11	Kristina Gießler	75.15	12	29.37	11	45.78
WD	Constanze Paulinus	WD	4	52.01	Withdrew from competition	

=== Pair skating ===
Rank	Name	Total points	SP		FS	
1	Aljona Savchenko / Robin Szolkowy	190.99	1	67.06	1	123.93
2	Rebecca Handke / Daniel Wende	142.80	2	51.21	2	91.59
3	Eva-Maria Fitze / Rico Rex	129.26	3	49.52	3	79.74
4	Mari-Doris Vartmann / Florian Just	113.54	4	44.87	4	68.67

=== Ice dance ===
Rank	Name	Total points	CD1		CD2		OD		FD	
1	Christina Beier / William Beier	194.04	1	18.55	1	19.33	1	58.92	1	97.24
2	Judith Haunstetter / Arne Hönlein	150.16	2	14.38	2	15.16	2	43.18	2	77.44
3	Barbara Piton / Alexandre Piton	132.57	3	14.08	3	14.27	3	36.99	3	67.23
4	Julia Schober / Christian Wilson	80.72	4	8.97	4	8.87	4	23.96	4	38.92

=== Synchronized ===
Rank	Name	TFP	SP	FS
1	Team Berlin I	1.5	1	1
2	Skating Mystery	3.5	3	2
3	United Angels	4.0	2	3
4	Shooting Stars	6.0	4	4
