= Robin Szolkowy =

German pair skater

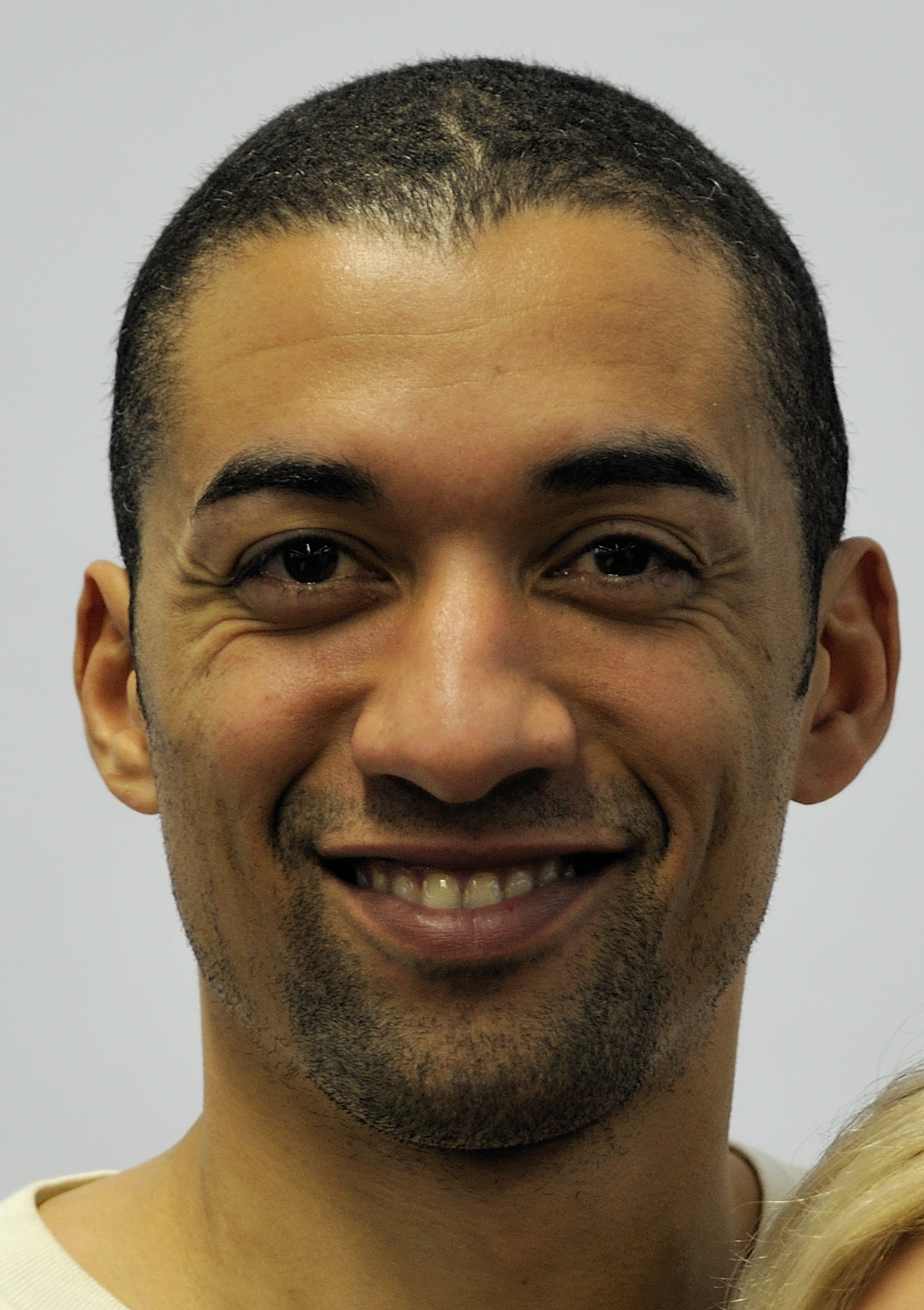
- Szolkowy in 2014

Personal information
- Born: 14 July 1979 (age 47) Greifswald, East Germany
- Height: 1.75 m (5 ft 9 in)

Figure skating career
- Country: Germany
- Skating club: Chemnitzer EC
- Began skating: 1983
- Retired: 27 March 2014
Event	Gold medal – first place	Silver medal – second place	Bronze medal – third place
Olympic Games	0	0	2
World Championships	5	2	1
European Championships	4	3	0
Grand Prix Final	4	1	3
German Championships	9	0	0
Medal list
Olympic Games
Bronze medal – third place	2010 Vancouver	Pairs
Bronze medal – third place	2014 Sochi	Pairs
World Championships
Gold medal – first place	2008 Gothenburg	Pairs
Gold medal – first place	2009 Los Angeles	Pairs
Gold medal – first place	2011 Moscow	Pairs
Gold medal – first place	2012 Nice	Pairs
Gold medal – first place	2014 Saitama	Pairs
Silver medal – second place	2010 Turin	Pairs
Silver medal – second place	2013 London	Pairs
Bronze medal – third place	2007 Tokyo	Pairs
European Championships
Gold medal – first place	2007 Warsaw	Pairs
Gold medal – first place	2008 Zagreb	Pairs
Gold medal – first place	2009 Helsinki	Pairs
Gold medal – first place	2011 Bern	Pairs
Silver medal – second place	2006 Lyon	Pairs
Silver medal – second place	2010 Tallinn	Pairs
Silver medal – second place	2013 Zagreb	Pairs
Grand Prix Final
Gold medal – first place	2007–08 Turin	Pairs
Gold medal – first place	2010–11 Beijing	Pairs
Gold medal – first place	2011–12 Quebec	Pairs
Gold medal – first place	2013–14 Fukuoka	Pairs
Silver medal – second place	2006–07 St. Petersburg	Pairs
Bronze medal – third place	2005–06 Tokyo	Pairs
Bronze medal – third place	2008–09 Goyang	Pairs
Bronze medal – third place	2009–10 Tokyo	Pairs
German Championships
Gold medal – first place	2001 Oberstdorf	Pairs
Gold medal – first place	2004 Berlin	Pairs
Gold medal – first place	2005 Oberstdorf	Pairs
Gold medal – first place	2006 Berlin	Pairs
Gold medal – first place	2007 Oberstdorf	Pairs
Gold medal – first place	2008 Dresden	Pairs
Gold medal – first place	2009 Oberstdorf	Pairs
Gold medal – first place	2011 Oberstdorf	Pairs
Gold medal – first place	2014 Berlin	Pairs

Robin Szolkowy (born 14 July 1979) is a retired German pair skater. With partner Aliona Savchenko, he is the 2010 and 2014 Olympic bronze medalist, a five-time World champion (2008, 2009, 2011, 2012, 2014), a four-time European champion (2007–2009, 2011), a four-time Grand Prix Final champion (2007, 2010, 2011, 2013), and an eight-time German national champion (2004–2009, 2011, 2014).

Savchenko and Szolkowy scored the first 10.0 ever given by a judge under the ISU Judging System.

== Personal life ==
Szolkowy was born in Greifswald, Rostock district, East Germany. His mother, a nurse, met his father, a Tanzanian medical doctor, when the latter was a student in Greifswald. Although he had seen photos of his father, the two did not meet until March 2008, in Vienna, Austria. Szolkowy married Romy Born, who is originally from Zürich, on 1 August 2014 in Chemnitz. On 11 May 2015, it was announced that Born and Szolkowy were expecting their first child together. Their son, Henry, was born on 14 September 2015.

== Early career ==
Szolkowy began skating in Erfurt in 1983 after his mother saw an advertisement for a new skating rink. Originally a singles skater, he switched to pairs when he was 16. His first partner was Johanna Otto.

In 1997, Szolkowy began skating with Claudia Rauschenbach, daughter of 1980 Olympic gold medalist Anett Pötzsch. Rauschenbach/Szolkowy won the German Junior National pair title three times and the 2001 senior German National pair title. Their best result at the World Junior Championships was ninth. Monika Scheibe coached the pair.

After Rauschenbach retired, Szolkowy was unable to find a new skating partner for a year and a half. During this forced hiatus, he participated in synchronized skating in an effort to maintain some of his skills.

== Partnership with Savchenko ==
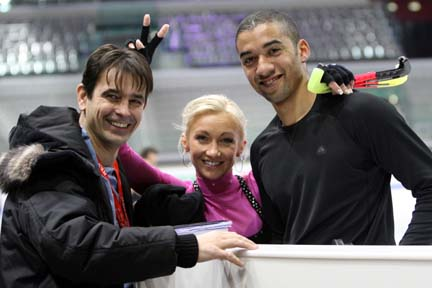
Savchenko and Szolkowy with their coach Ingo Steuer

After Aliona Savchenko, the 2000 World Junior champion (with Stanislav Morozov), told a German journalist she was looking for a partner, he spoke to German coaches and suggested Szolkowy, whom she recognized from a competition. In May 2003, Savchenko and Szolkowy had a successful tryout in Chemnitz, Germany. Three months later, she relocated to Germany and the new team began training in earnest with former World champion Ingo Steuer as their coach. When they first teamed up, they had to adjust to the fact that they had been taught different basics. They also had communication difficulties — he spoke German and English while she knew only Russian.

Savchenko/Szolkowy worked mostly in Chemnitz, training twice a day, six days a week. Ingo Steuer served as their coach, choreographer, skate sharpener, and music cutter. Savchenko designed the pair's costumes. When the Chemnitz ice rink was melted – generally from the start of April to mid-May – they trained in Dresden if they needed ice time during this period.

In their first season together, Savchenko/Szolkowy won the German National title. They made their international debut as a team at the start of the 2004–05 season. They again won the German National pair title, placed fourth at 2005 European Championships and sixth at the 2005 World Championships.

=== 2005–06 season ===
In the 2005–06 season, Savchenko/Szolkowy earned their first Grand Prix gold medal at the Skate Canada, placing first in both programs, and went on win the bronze medal in their first appearance at the Grand Prix Final. After winning their third national title, Savchenko/Szolkowy took the silver medal in their second appearance at the European Championships. They finished 7.79 points behind champions Tatiana Totmianina / Maxim Marinin.

Savchenko was granted German citizenship on 29 December 2005, making it possible for the pair to compete at the 2006 Winter Olympics. Just prior to the Olympics, the National Olympic Committee of Germany decided to exclude their coach, Ingo Steuer, from the Olympic team due to his collusion with the Stasi. After a court battle, he was granted accreditation. Savchenko/Szolkowy finished sixth with 180.15 points. They also placed sixth at 2006 Worlds some weeks later, where they earned 170.08 points overall.

=== 2006–07 season ===
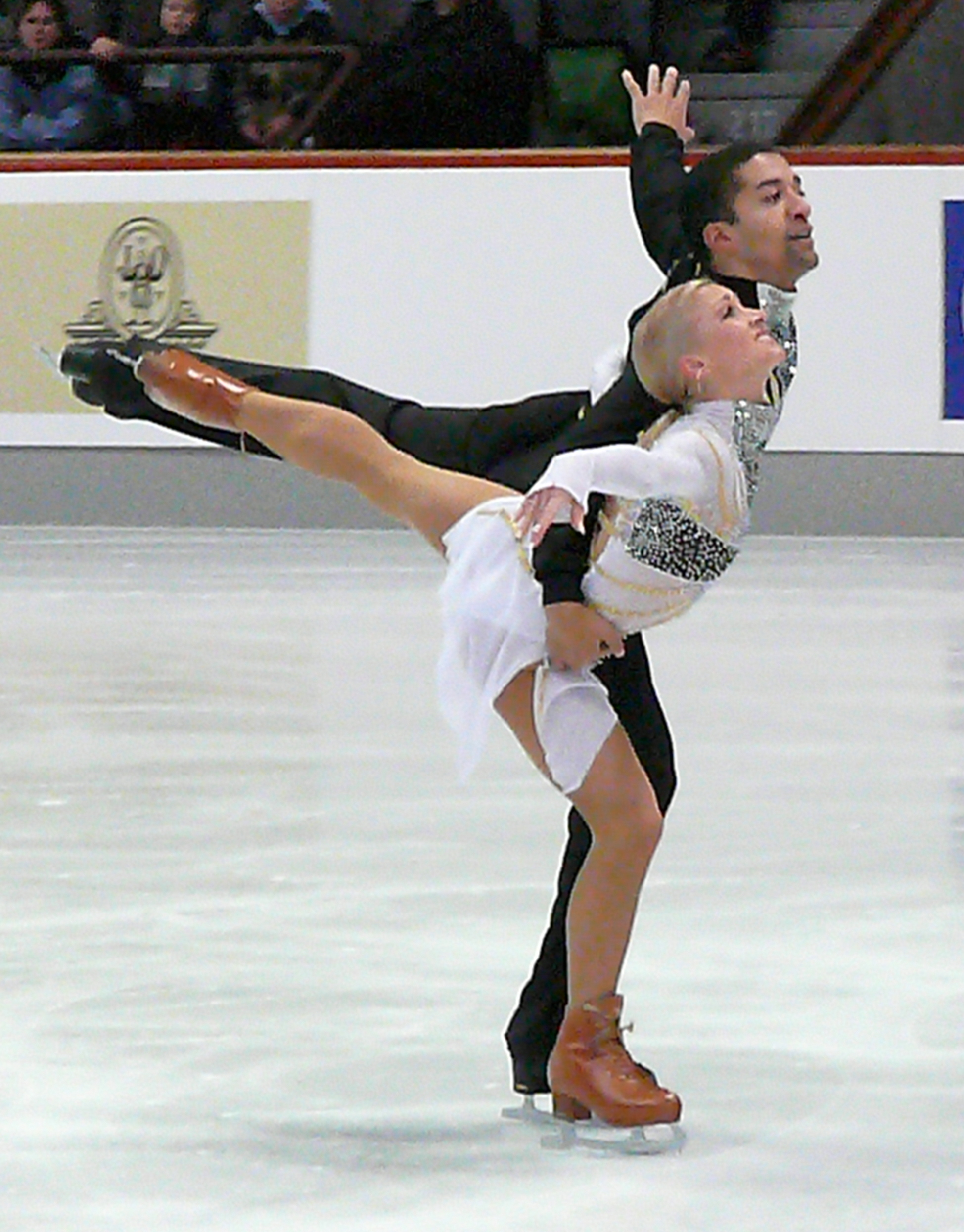
Savchenko and Szolkowy at the 2007 German Championships.

The German Ministry of Interior Affairs continued to put pressure on the German Skating Federation over the Steuer affair. As a result, the pair's coach was denied accreditation for the upcoming competitions but the team challenged this in court and won. However, the pair's refusal to leave their coach cost Szolkowy his place in the German army, which had sponsored his skating. Private sponsors and fans supported the pair.

Savchenko/Szolkowy placed third at the 2006 Cup of China and won the 2006 Cup of Russia, qualifying them to the 2006–2007 Grand Prix Final, held in Saint Petersburg. They finished second with a total of 180.67 points, 22.52 behind Shen Xue / Zhao Hongbo, who won gold. In January 2007, they won their fourth German national title.

Savchenko/Szolkowy won the European Championships for the first time, becoming the first German pair skaters to win the title in twelve years; their coach, Ingo Steuer, had won with Mandy Wötzel in 1995. They won the short program with 65.38 points, although Savchenko fell on the throw triple flip. In the free skate, they set a new personal best of 134.01 points while skating to the soundtrack of the film The Mission. Their combined total of 199.39 points was also a new best, and they finished 19.78 points ahead of silver medalists Maria Petrova / Alexei Tikhonov.

Savchenko/Szolkowy made their third World appearance at the 2007 World Championships. Second in the short program and third in the free skate, they won their first World medal, a bronze. Their total score was 16.11 points behind gold medalists Shen/Zhao.

=== 2007–08 season ===
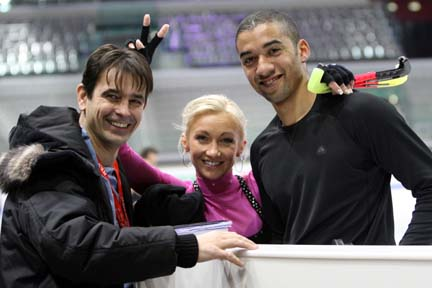
Savchenko and Szolkowy with their coach Ingo Steuer in 2007

In the 2007–08 season, Savchenko/Szolkowy won gold at the 2007 Skate Canada, silver at the 2007 Cup of Russia (second to Zhang Dan / Zhang Hao), and gold at the 2007 NHK Trophy. At the 2007–08 Grand Prix Final in December 2007, Savchenko/Szolkowy scored 72.14 in the short program, setting a new world record, and a season's best of 127.09 points in the free skate to win the pair title with 199.23 overall, eight points ahead of silver medalists Zhang/Zhang.

In January 2008, Savchenko/Szolkowy successfully defended their European title. Finishing first in both segments with a total score of 202.39 points, they won their second European title by a 32.98-point lead over silver medalists Maria Mukhortova / Maxim Trankov. At the 2008 World Championships, held in Gothenburg, Sweden, they placed second in the short program, 2.36 points behind Zhang/Zhang of China, and first in the free skate, 6.74 ahead of Jessica Dubé / Bryce Davison. Overall, Savchenko/Szolkowy finished 5.04 points ahead of silver medalists Zhang/Zhang and won their first World Championship title.

=== 2008–09 season ===
In the 2008–09 season, Savchenko/Szolkowy won both of their Grand Prix assignments, the 2008 Skate America and the 2008 Trophée Eric Bompard. They took the bronze medal at the 2008–09 Grand Prix Final, earning a season's best of 70.14 in the short program and placing third in the long program with a score of 114.95. Overall, they earned 185.09 points to finish 6.40 points behind gold medalists Pang Qing / Tong Jian.

In late January 2009, they competed at the 2009 European Championships as the defending champions. After placing second in the short program, 2.98 behind Maria Mukhortova / Maxim Trankov, they won the free skate with a season's best score of 132.43 points and won the competition overall with a total of 199.07 points, 16.30 points ahead of silver medalists Yuko Kavaguti / Alexander Smirnov. This earned Savchenko/Szolkowy their third consecutive European title.

Savchenko/Szolkowy went to the 2009 World Championships as the defending champions. Despite Savchenko fighting a flu, they tallied a personal best 72.30 points in the short program to take the lead by a margin of 3.36 points over Kavaguti/Smirnov. They also won the free skate with 131.18 points. A throw triple salchow on the last beat of their music in the long program ensured victory. They finished with a combined total of 203.48 points, another personal best, and won by almost 17 points over silver medalists Zhang Dan / Zhang Hao. Savchenko/Szolkowy were the first German pair since Marika Kilius / Hans-Jürgen Bäumler (1963 and 1964) to successfully defend a World Championship title.

=== 2009–10 season ===
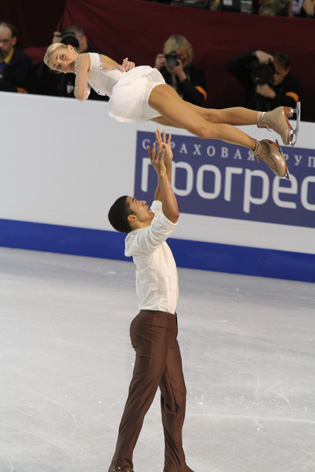
Savchenko and Szolkowy perform a triple twist at the 2010 European Championships.

Savchenko/Szolkowy began the 2009–10 season at the 2009 Nebelhorn Trophy. They finished first in both segments and earned the gold medal with a total score of 185.99 points. At their first Grand Prix of the season, the 2009 Trophée Eric Bompard, the pair placed first in the short program with a new personal best score of 72.98 points, leading by 6.1 points over Maria Mukhortova / Maxim Trankov, but finished fourth in the free skate with 101.44 points. Overall, they won the bronze medal with 174.42 points, 18.51 behind gold medalists Mukhortova/Trankov. On the plane back to Germany, Steuer suggested scrapping their long program to You'll Never Walk Alone, which had been recorded for them by André Rieu's orchestra in Maastricht. Although they had worked on the program since May, Savchenko said it "just didn't suit us", so they decided to prepare a new one to the soundtrack of Out of Africa.

At the 2009 Skate Canada, Savchenko/Szolkowy won the short program, improving their personal best to 74.16 points, and leading the rest of the field by 8.36 points. They also won the free skate with a score of 132.55 points, placing first overall with 206.71 points, 21 ahead of Mukhortova/Trankov. They set a new world record for pairs' combined total under the ISU Judging System. It was also the first time a judge gave a 10.0 under the Code of Points.

Their placements in their two 2009–10 Grand Prix events qualified them for the 2009–10 Grand Prix Final that was held in Tokyo, Japan, in December 2009. Savchenko/Szolkowy placed second in the short program with 73.14 points, 2.22 behind Shen Xue / Zhao Hongbo. However, they finished fourth in the free skate with 127.24 points. They won the bronze medal overall with 200.38 points, 13.87 behind gold medalists Shen/Zhao. Savchenko developed a flu during the Grand Prix Final which worsened and forced the pair to withdraw from German Nationals.

At the 2010 European Championships, Savchenko/Szolkowy led in the short program with 74.12 points, by just 0.2 over Yuko Kavaguti / Alexander Smirnov. They placed second in the free skate with a new personal best 137.60 points, 1.63 behind gold medalists Kavaguti/Smirnov, who consequently placed first in the free skate and overall. Overall, Savchenko and Szolkowy earned a new personal best score of 211.72 points.

At the 2010 Winter Olympics in Vancouver, Canada, Savchenko/Szolkowy earned their personal best score of 75.96 points in the short program, yet only placed second. Shen/Zhao took the top stop with a world record short program score of 76.66 points. They placed third in the free skating with 134.64 points, 7.16 behind Pang Qing / Tong Jian, who placed first in that segment. Overall they won the bronze medal with 210.60 points, 5.97 behind gold medalists and Olympic champions Shen/Zhao and 2.71 behind silver medalists Pang/Tong.

Savchenko/Szolkowy ended their season at the 2010 World Championships. They placed third in the short program with 69.52 points, which was 5.76 behind leaders Pang/Tong. In the free skate they placed second with a score of 135.22 points, 0.89 behind Pang/Tong, who also won that segment to capture the gold medal. Overall, the team totaled 204.74 points to win the silver medal. Following the Olympics, Savchenko/Szolkowy both concluded they would like to continue competing at least another season.

Savchenko/Szolkowy toured in multiple ice shows around the world, including the 2009 Ice All Stars, All That Skate in South Korea, and the 2010 Art on Ice in Lausanne, Switzerland.

=== 2010–11 season ===
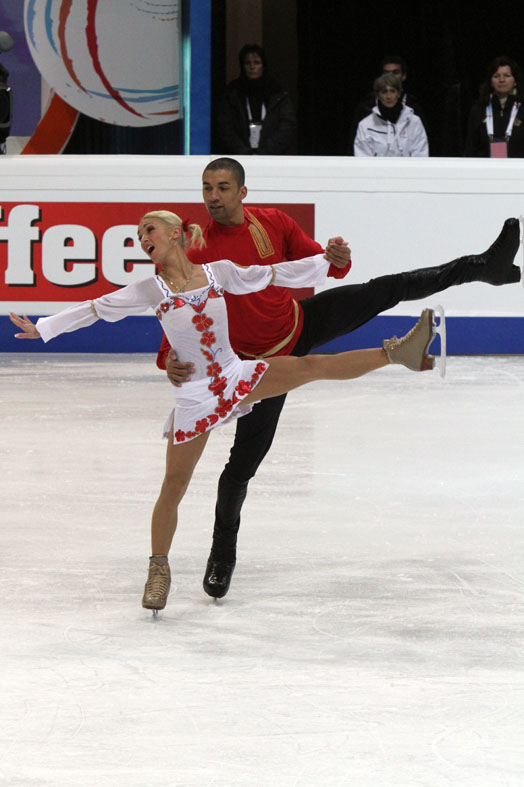
Savchenko and Szolkowy perform their short program at the 2011 European Championships.

After performing in fifteen shows, Savchenko/Szolkowy began training for the 2010–11 season in May 2010 in Chemnitz. The pair experimented with a throw quad flip in training. Steuer said, "It did work sometimes, but it needs extremely high concentration." In September 2010, Savchenko stated that they "plan to continue through 2014, but you never know if our bodies will work as we like them to work."

Savchenko/Szolkowy won 2010 Skate America by over 20 points and 2010 Trophée Eric Bompard by 14 points, and were the top qualifiers for the 2010–11 Grand Prix Final. On their way back from France, the airline lost their luggage containing their skates, resulting in concerns the pair would be forced to withdraw from the Grand Prix Final. Skates were not permitted as part of hand luggage, the blades being considered potential weapons. The airline found their luggage a few days later. They placed first in both the short and long program at the 2010–11 Grand Prix Final to win the title.

At the European Championships, Savchenko/Szolkowy won the short program by almost three points, receiving a perfect ten for performance and execution from one of the judges. In the long program, the pair received zero points for a spin after an error by Savchenko; they placed second in the free program by less than a point, finishing first overall to win their fourth European title ahead of 2010 champions Kavaguti/Smirnov. Their training ice was scheduled to be melted in late March, after they would normally have left for the World Championships, however, the competition was postponed to late April. They were able to get their ice time extended until Easter, with the city and sport association negotiating the finances.

At the 2011 World Championships, Savchenko/Szolkowy were in second place following the short program. They went on to win their third World Championships with a record-breaking free skate. Their total score was also a new world record. With this win, the pair capped off a season in which they won every event they entered.

=== 2011–12 season ===
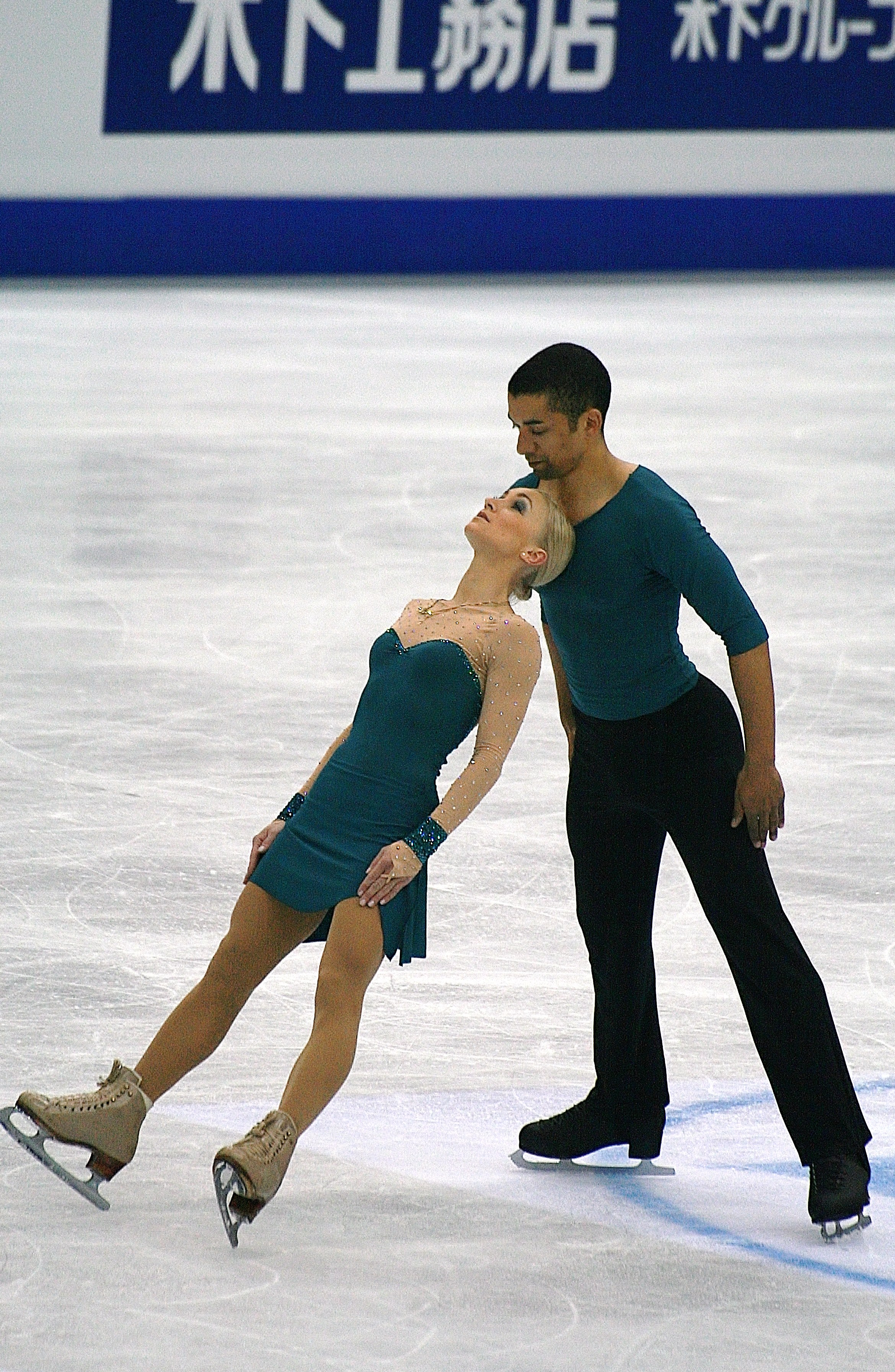
Savchenko and Szolkowy perform their Pina free skate at the 2012 World Championships

Savchenko/Szolkowy took up the option of competing at three Grand Prix events during the 2011–12 season. They are entered in 2011 Skate America, 2011 NHK Trophy and 2011 Cup of Russia. In October, they confirmed Pina and Angels & Demons as their new music selections and said they were practicing a throw triple Axel, successfully executed in international competition by only one previous pair, Americans Rena Inoue / John Baldwin at the 2006 Winter Olympics. At Skate America, Savchenko/Szolkowy attempted the throw triple Axel in the short program but experienced a hard fall. They were given credit for completing the revolutions and finished in 5th place, 3.4 points off the lead. They rebounded to place first in the free skate and won their second consecutive Skate America title and third in their career. They added a reverse lasso lift to their free program but performed only a double twist because they were still working on a new entry to the triple.

They attempted the throw triple Axel again in the short program at 2011 NHK Trophy but Savchenko took another hard fall. They finished third at the event. Savchenko/Szolkowy rebounded to win the 2011 Rostelecom Cup. They qualified for the 2011–12 Grand Prix Final. Although they did not attempt it in Russia, they said they had not ruled out the triple Axel. At the Grand Prix Final, Savchenko/Szolkowy won the gold medal with a total score of 212.26, defeating Volosozhar/Trankov by a margin of only 0.18 points. Savchenko/Szolkowy missed their nationals with the German Skating Union's okay and continued to work on the throw triple Axel.

In October 2011, Savchenko/Szolkowy were awarded the public prize at Germany's tenth and final Unity Prize ceremony. In January 2012, they were voted Saxony's Sports Team of 2011.

Savchenko ruptured a muscle fiber in her left upper thigh as a result of a fall in training on 12 January 2012. Because she was not fully fit, the pair considered withdrawing from the 2012 European Championships (pairs event 25–26 January) or reducing the level of planned difficulty but said they feared a withdrawal would result in a one-year ban from competition if they performed in 2–8 February Art on Ice shows, a significant source of income (around 80,000 euros) for the pair which receives no funding from the German federation. By the start of the competition, Savchenko was able to land jumps and throws but spins aggravated her injury, causing the pair to withdraw before the short program on 25 January.

At the 2012 World Championships in Nice, France, Savchenko/Szolkowy were first in the short program on 28 March. After falls on previous competition attempts, Savchenko landed the throw triple Axel for the first time in their career but her free foot touched the ice. On 29 March, Szolkowy lost a court case seeking reinstatement to the Bundeswehr which funded his sports career until 2006 – the court stated he did not have an authorized coach. Savchenko/Szolkowy were second in the free skate on 30 March but finished first overall. They won their fourth World title – becoming the fifth pair in the post-World War II period to do so – by a margin of 0.11 points over silver medalists Volosozhar/Trankov.

=== 2012–13 season ===
Savchenko/Szolkowy began the season with gold at the 2012 Skate Canada International, although Savchenko had a flu. Officials elected not to impose a deduction after Szolkowy violated the regulation against men wearing tights. Steuer said they would consider making some adjustments. Their colorful costumes received a mixed reaction, with one Canadian journalist describing them as "something that looked like the cat threw up", however, Szolkowy said he was pleased with the results of their collaboration with a Chemnitz design studio. On 8 November 2012, it was announced that Savchenko/Szolkowy had signed a three-year agreement with their first major sponsor, ThomasLloyd, a Swiss investment banking group. Szolkowy said that they no longer had to worry about finances. The pair said they were uncertain if they would compete at their second Grand Prix assignment, the 2012 Trophée Eric Bompard, due to Savchenko's illness. Savchenko's cold having developed into a severe sinus infection, the pair confirmed their withdrawal a week later. Since ISU rules do not allow another GP event to be given if skaters withdraw for any reason from an assignment, this also meant they would not qualify for the Grand Prix Final in Sochi. They won silver medals at both the 2013 European Championships and the 2013 World Championships.

=== 2013–14 season ===
Savchenko/Szolkowy were assigned to the 2013 Cup of China and the 2013 Rostelecom Cup as their Grand Prix events. They finished second in the short program but won the free skate to claim the Cup of China title, making them only the second pair to win all six Grand Prix events. At the 2013–14 Grand Prix Final, Savchenko/Szolkowy edged out Volosozhar/Trankov for the gold medal after placing second in the short and first in the free setting a new personal best scores total of 227.03 points. They then competed at the 2014 European Championships but withdrew after the short program because of Savchenko's flu.

At the 2014 Winter Olympics in Sochi, Russia, Savchenko/Szolkowy earned the bronze medal. They placed second in the short program and fourth in the free skate. During the free skate, Szolkowy fell on the pair's side-by-side triple jumps and Savchenko fell on the throw triple Axel at the conclusion of the program and dropping to third in the overall standings behind Ksenia Stolbova / Fedor Klimov.

Savchenko/Szolkowy decided to compete at the 2014 World Championships and won their fifth world title together. They have the second-most world championship titles in pairs, second only to Irina Rodnina / Alexander Zaitsev. Szolkowy retired from competition after Worlds and performed with Savchenko in a farewell show in Chemnitz at the end of April. Thomas Lloyd ended its sponsorship, in July 2014.

== Post-competitive career ==
In July 2014, Szolkowy teamed up with Swiss skater Myriam Leuenberger to perform in ice shows. Considering a coaching career, he accepted Nina Mozer's invitation to work alongside her in Russia. The contract ran from September 2014 to April 2015. In June 2015, Mozer announced that Szolkowy would continue working with her students for the 2015–16 season.

Szolkowy's current and former students include:

- Evgenia Tarasova / Vladimir Morozov (European and Grand Prix Final champions in the 2016–17 season). Szolkowy started coaching them in September 2014.
- Vasilisa Davankova / Alexander Enbert, coached them from the fall of 2014 until their split in the summer of 2015
- Natalia Zabiiako / Alexander Enbert, began coaching the team when the team formed in the summer of 2015

In December 2014, Szolkowy was elected to the Deutscher Olympischer Sportbund. He and his wife also have a sports marketing company. In March 2015, it was announced that he would serve as Germany's pair skating development coordinator on a freelance basis. On 16 September 2015, Szolkowy was unanimously elected president of Chemnitzer Eislauf-Club (Chemnitz Skating Club).

In January 2019, Szolkowy decided to move to the United States to coach at a rink in Irvine, California, beginning in April.

== Programs ==
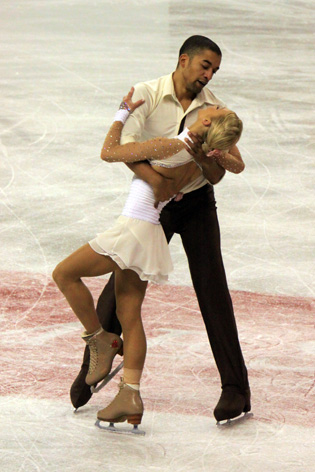
Savchenko and Szolkowy perform their free skate to Out of Africa at 2009 Skate Canada.

(with Savchenko)

Season	Short program	Free skating	Exhibition
2013–2014	The Pink Panther by Christophe Beck, Henry Mancini choreo. by Ingo Steuer, David Wilson; When Winter Comes by André Rieu choreo. by Ingo Steuer, David Wilson	The Nutcracker by Pyotr Ilyich Tchaikovsky choreo. by Ingo Steuer, David Wilson	Nella Fantasia by Il Divo choreographed by Ingo Steuer; The Nutcracker by Pyotr Ilyich Tchaikovsky choreo. by Ingo Steuer, David Wilson; Stay by Hurts; When Winter Comes by André Rieu choreo. by Ingo Steuer, David Wilson; Suit & Tie by Justin Timberlake
2012–2013	Kismet by Bond choreo. by Ingo Steuer	Flamenco Bolero by Gustavo Montesano choreo. by Ingo Steuer	Nella Fantasia by Il Divo choreographed by Ingo Steuer; Happy by Leona Lewis choreo. by Ingo Steuer; The Pink Panther by Christophe Beck, Henry Mancini choreo. by Ingo Steuer
2011–2012	Angels & Demons by Hans Zimmer choreo. by Ingo Steuer	Pina by Thomas Hanreich choreo. by Ingo Steuer	Hungriges Herz performed by Scala & Kolacny Brothers choreo. by Ingo Steuer; Autumn Moon on a Calm Lake by Lang Lang choreo. by Ingo Steuer; Diversity by Emily Bear choreo. by Ingo Steuer; If You Don't Know Me by Now performed by Mick Hucknall choreo. by Ingo Steuer
2010–2011	Korobushka performed by Bond choreo. by Ingo Steuer	The Pink Panther by Christophe Beck, Henry Mancini choreo. by Ingo Steuer	You'll Never Be Alone by Anastacia choreo. by Ingo Steuer; Barbie Girl by Aqua choreo. by Ingo Steuer; Gee by Girls' Generation choreo. by Ingo Steuer
2009–2010	Send In the Clowns (from A Little Night Music) by Stephen Sondheim performed by Danny Wright choreo. by Ingo Steuer	Out of Africa by John Barry choreo. by Ingo Steuer; You'll Never Walk Alone (from Carousel) by Richard Rodgers performed by André Rieu choreo. by Ingo Steuer	Somewhere (from West Side Story) by Stephen Sondheim choreo. by Ingo Steuer; Bad Day by Daniel Powter choreo. by Ingo Steuer; Leningrad by Chris de Burgh choreo. by Ingo Steuer; Fascination by Alphabeat choreo. by Ingo Steuer; Send In the Clowns (from A Little Night Music) by Stephen Sondheim performed by Danny Wright choreo. by Ingo Steuer
2008–2009	Lost in Space by Apollo 440 choreo. by Ingo Steuer	Schindler's List by John Williams; Adagio by Remo Giazotto, Tomaso Albinoni choreo. by Ingo Steuer	We've Got Tonight by Kenny Rogers, Sheena Easton choreo. by Ingo Steuer; Pie Jesu by Sarah Brightman performed by Anna Maria Kaufmann choreo. by Ingo Steuer; Leningrad by Chris de Burgh choreo. by Ingo Steuer
2007–2008	Asoka by Anu Malik choreo. by Ingo Steuer	L'Oiseau (from Cirque du Soleil) by René Dupéré choreo. by Ingo Steuer	Leningrad by Chris de Burgh choreo. by Ingo Steuer; Nella Fantasia by Il Divo choreographed by Ingo Steuer; Titanic by James Horner choreo. by Ingo Steuer; Feeling Good by Michael Bublé choreo. by Ingo Steuer
2006–2007	Once Upon a Time in Mexico (2003 film) by Brian Setzer choreo. by Ingo Steuer	The Mission by Ennio Morricone choreo. by Ingo Steuer	Feeling Good by Michael Bublé choreo. by Ingo Steuer; Somewhere (from West Side Story) by Stephen Sondheim, Leonard Bernstein choreo. by Ingo Steuer
2005–2006	Souvenir De Chine by Jean-Michel Jarre choreo. by Ingo Steuer	1492: Conquest Of Paradise by Vangelis choreo. by Ingo Steuer	Hey Ya! by Outkast choreo. by Ingo Steuer; Belle (from Notre-Dame de Paris) by Garou, Daniel Lavoie, Patrick Fiori choreo. by Ingo Steuer
2004–2005	Isolde by Maurice Luttikkus performed by Rondo Veneziano choreo. by Ingo Steuer	Casablanca by Max Steiner choreo. by Ingo Steuer	Belle (from Notre-Dame de Paris) by Garou, Daniel Lavoie, Patrick Fiori performed by Smash choreo. by Ingo Steuer

== Competitive highlights ==
GP: Grand Prix; JGP: Junior Grand Prix

=== With Savchenko ===
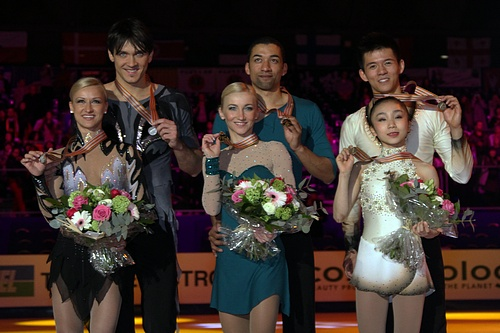
Savchenko and Szolkowy with the other medalists at the 2012 World Championships

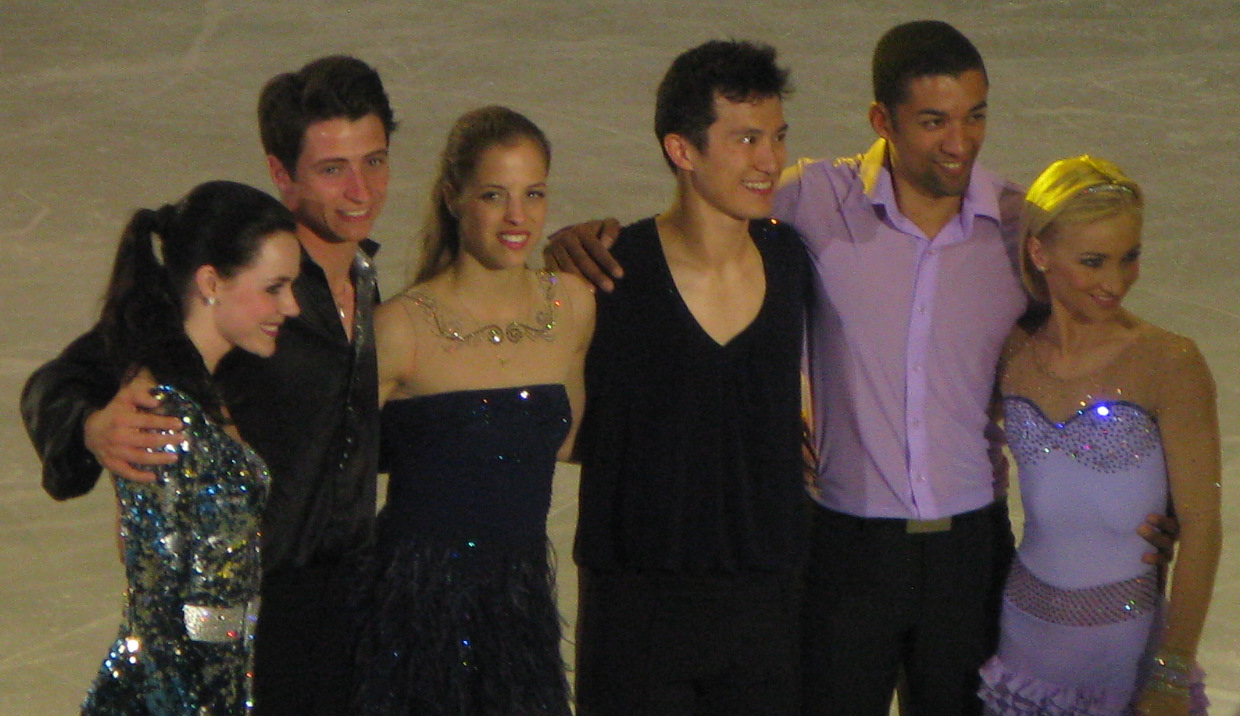
Savchenko and Szolkowy with the other gold medalists at the 2012 World Championships

International
Event	03–04	04–05	05–06	06–07	07–08	08–09	09–10	10–11	11–12	12–13	13–14
Olympics			6th				3rd				3rd
Worlds		6th	6th	3rd	1st	1st	2nd	1st	1st	2nd	1st
Europeans		4th	2nd	1st	1st	1st	2nd	1st	WD	2nd	WD
GP Final			3rd	2nd	1st	3rd	3rd	1st	1st		1st
GP Bompard						1st	3rd	1st		WD	
GP Cup of China				3rd							1st
GP Cup of Russia		3rd		1st	2nd				1st		1st
GP NHK Trophy			2nd		1st				3rd		
GP Skate Canada			1st		1st		1st			1st	
GP Skate America						1st		1st	1st		
Nebelhorn		3rd	1st		1st	1st	1st				
Nepela Memorial		1st									
NRW Trophy										1st	
National
German Champ.	1st	1st	1st	1st	1st	1st		1st			1st
WD: Withdrew

=== With Rauschenbach ===
International
Event	1997–98	1998–99	1999–00	2000–01
Junior Worlds			10th	9th
JGP Germany		8th		6th
JGP Hungary		6th		
JGP Netherlands			4th	
JGP Poland				7th
JGP Sweden			5th	
National
German Champ.	4th J.	1st J.	1st J.	1st
J. = Junior

=== With Otto ===
International
Event	1996–97
World Junior Championships	13th
Blue Swords	10th
International St. Gervais	7th

== Detailed results ==
Small medals for short and free programs awarded only at ISU Championships.

With Savchenko

2013–14 season
Date	Event	SP	FS	Total
24–30 March 2014	2014 World Championships	1; 79.02	1; 145.86	1; 224.88
6–22 February 2014	2014 Winter Olympics	2; 79.64	4; 136.14	3; 215.78
13–19 January 2014	2014 European Championships	2; 76.76	WD	WD
14–15 December 2013	2014 German Championships	1; 76.29	1; 139.43	1; 215.72
5–8 December 2013	2013–14 Grand Prix Final	2; 79.46	1; 147.57	1; 227.03
22–24 November 2013	2013 Cup of Russia	1; 73.25	1; 133.08	1; 206.33
1–3 November 2013	2013 Cup of China	2; 69.07	1; 132.14	1; 201.21
2012–13 season
Date	Event	SP	FS	Total
13–15 March 2013	2013 World Championships	3; 73.47	2; 132.09	2; 205.56
23–27 January 2014	2013 European Championships	2; 70.21	2; 135.03	2; 205.24
5–9 December 2012	2012 NRW Trophy	1; 73.55	1; 133.97	1; 207.52
26–28 October 2012	2012 Skate Canada	1; 72.26	1; 129.10	1; 201.36
2011–12 season
Date	Event	SP	FS	Total
26 March – 1 April 2012	2012 World Championships	1; 68.63	2; 132.86	1; 201.49
8–11 December 2011	2011–12 Grand Prix Final	2; 69.82	1; 142.44	1; 212.26
24–27 November 2011	2011 Cup of Russia	1; 68.72	1; 139.97	1; 208.69
10–13 November 2011	2011 NHK Trophy	1; 59.23	3; 112.45	3; 171.68
21–23 October 2011	2011 Skate America	5; 59.45	1; 124.53	1; 183.98
2010–11 season
Date	Event	SP	FS	Total
25 April – 1 May 2011	2011 World Championships	2; 72.98	1; 144.87	1; 217.85
24–30 January 2011	2011 European Championships	1; 72.31	2; 133.89	1; 206.20
7–9 January 2011	2011 German Championships	1; 77.37	1; 132.03	1; 209.40
8–12 December 2010	2010–11 Grand Prix Final	1; 74.40	1; 136.32	1; 210.72
25–28 November 2010	2010 Trophée Éric Bompard	1; 66.65	1; 131.23	1; 197.88
11–14 November 2010	2010 Skate America	1; 63.99	1; 133.71	1; 197.70
2009–10 season
Date	Event	SP	FS	Total
22–28 March 2010	2010 World Championships	3; 69.52	2; 135.22	2; 204.74
14–15 February 2010	2010 Winter Olympics	2; 75.96	3; 134.64	3; 210.60
18–24 January 2010	2010 European Championships	1; 74.12	2; 137.60	2; 211.72
2–6 December 2009	2009–10 Grand Prix Final	2; 73.14	4; 127.24	3; 200.38
19–22 November 2009	2009 Skate Canada	1; 74.16	1; 132.55	1; 206.71
15–18 October 2009	2009 Trophée Éric Bompard	1; 72.98	4; 101.44	3; 174.42
23–26 September 2009	2009 Nebelhorn Trophy	1; 72.80	1; 113.19	1; 185.99
2008–09 season
Date	Event	SP	FS	Total
23–29 March 2009	2009 World Championships	1; 72.30	1; 131.18	1; 203.48
20–25 January 2009	2009 European Championships	2; 66.64	1; 132.43	1; 199.07
18–21 December 2008	2009 German Championships	1; 72.68	1; 124.52	1; 197.20
10–14 December 2008	2008–09 Grand Prix Final	1; 70.14	3; 114.95	3; 185.09
13–16 November 2008	2008 Trophée Éric Bompard	1; 68.18	1; 120.32	1; 188.50
23–26 October 2008	2008 Skate America	2; 64.08	1; 116.69	1; 180.77
25–29 September 2008	2008 Nebelhorn Trophy	1; 67.73	1; 115.49	1; 183.22
2007–08 season
Date	Event	SP	FS	Total
16–23 March 2008	2008 World Championships	2; 72.00	1; 130.86	1; 202.86
21–27 January 2008	2008 European Championships	1; 70.36	1; 132.03	1; 202.39
3–6 January 2008	2008 German Championships	1; 77.98	1; 136.69	1; 214.67
13–16 December 2007	2007–08 Grand Prix Final	1; 72.14	1; 127.09	1; 199.23
28 November – 2 December 2007	2007 NHK Trophy	1; 70.32	1; 120.32	1; 190.64
22–25 November 2007	2007 Cup of Russia	2; 66.78	2; 119.17	2; 185.95
1–4 November 2007	2007 Skate Canada	1; 69.44	1; 119.19	1; 188.63
27–30 September 2007	2007 Nebelhorn Trophy	1; 69.33	1; 105.82	1; 175.15
2006–07 season
Date	Event	SP	FS	Total
20–25 March 2007	2007 World Championships	2; 67.65	3; 119.74	3; 187.39
22–28 January 2007	2007 European Championships	1; 65.38	1; 134.01	1; 199.39
4–7 January 2007	2007 German Championships	1; 72.37	1; 118.16	1; 190.53
14–17 December 2006	2006–07 Grand Prix Final	4; 58.82	2; 121.85	2; 180.67
23–26 November 2006	2006 Cup of Russia	1; 63.96	2; 115.49	1; 179.45
9–12 November 2006	2006 Cup of China	3; 58.64	2; 112.99	3; 171.63
2005–06 season
Date	Event	SP	FS	Total
19–26 March 2006	2006 World Championships	5; 61.24	7; 108.84	6; 170.08
11–24 February 2006	2006 Winter Olympics	7; 60.96	5; 119.19	6; 180.15
17–22 January 2006	2006 European Championships	3; 64.46	2; 127.83	2; 188.08
27–30 December 2005	2006 German Championships	1; 59.72	1; 123.88	1; 183.60
16–18 December 2005	2005–06 Grand Prix Final	3; 61.78	3; 118.32	3; 180.10
1–4 December 2005	2005 NHK Trophy	1; 61.06	2; 110.60	2; 170.84
27–30 October 2005	2005 Skate Canada	1; 60.54	1; 115.06	1; 175.60
29 September – 2 October 2005	2005 Nebelhorn Trophy	1; 60.33	2; 101.65	1; 161.98
2004–05 season
Date	Event	SP	FS	Total
14–20 March 2005	2005 World Championships	8; 58.74	6; 110.28	6; 169.02
25–30 January 2005	2005 European Championships	4; 59.45	4; 99.28	4; 158.73
6–9 January 2005	2005 German Championships	1; 67.06	1; 123.93	1; 190.99
25–28 November 2004	2004 Cup of Russia	7; 49.18	3; 102.20	3; 151.38
23–26 September 2004	2004 Ondrej Nepela Memorial	1	1	1
2–5 September 2004	2004 Nebelhorn Trophy	5; 35.57	2; 90.94	3; 135.40
2003–04 season
Date	Event	SP	FS	Total
2–4 January 2004	2004 German Championships	1	1	1
