= Christina Erdel =

German figure skater

Personal information
- Full name: Christina Erdel
- Born: 18 January 1995 (age 31) Düsseldorf
- Home town: Oberstdorf
- Height: 1.66 m (5 ft 5 in)

Figure skating career
- Country: Germany
- Coach: Eran Sragowicz
- Skating club: EC Oberstdorf

Christina Erdel (born 18 January 1995, in Düsseldorf, Germany) is a German figure skater. She is the 2011 German bronze medalist and the 2008 Novice bronze medalist.

Erdel represented the Skating club of Düsseldorf (DEG) until she moved with her coach to Oberstdorf in 2010. She now represents the Skating Club of Oberstdorf.

== Programs ==
Season	Short Program	Free Skating
2011-2012	Bring on the Men (Jekyll & Hyde soundtrack) by Frank Wildhorn	Raymond Ouverture by Ambroise Thomas Don Quixotes by Leon Minkus

== Competitive highlights ==
Event	2007-08	2008-09	2009-10	2010-11	2011-12	2012-13
German Championships	3rd N.	7th J.	9th	3rd	7th	
Bavarian Open		6th J.	4th			
Coupe Internationale de Nice				6th J.		
Merano Cup				19th		
NRW Trophy	6th N.		5th J.	20th		
Junior Grand Prix, Latvia					20th	
European Olympic Youth Days				12th		
Heiko Fischer Pokal			4th J.			
N. = Novice level; J. = Junior level
