= Kristin Wieczorek =

German figure skater

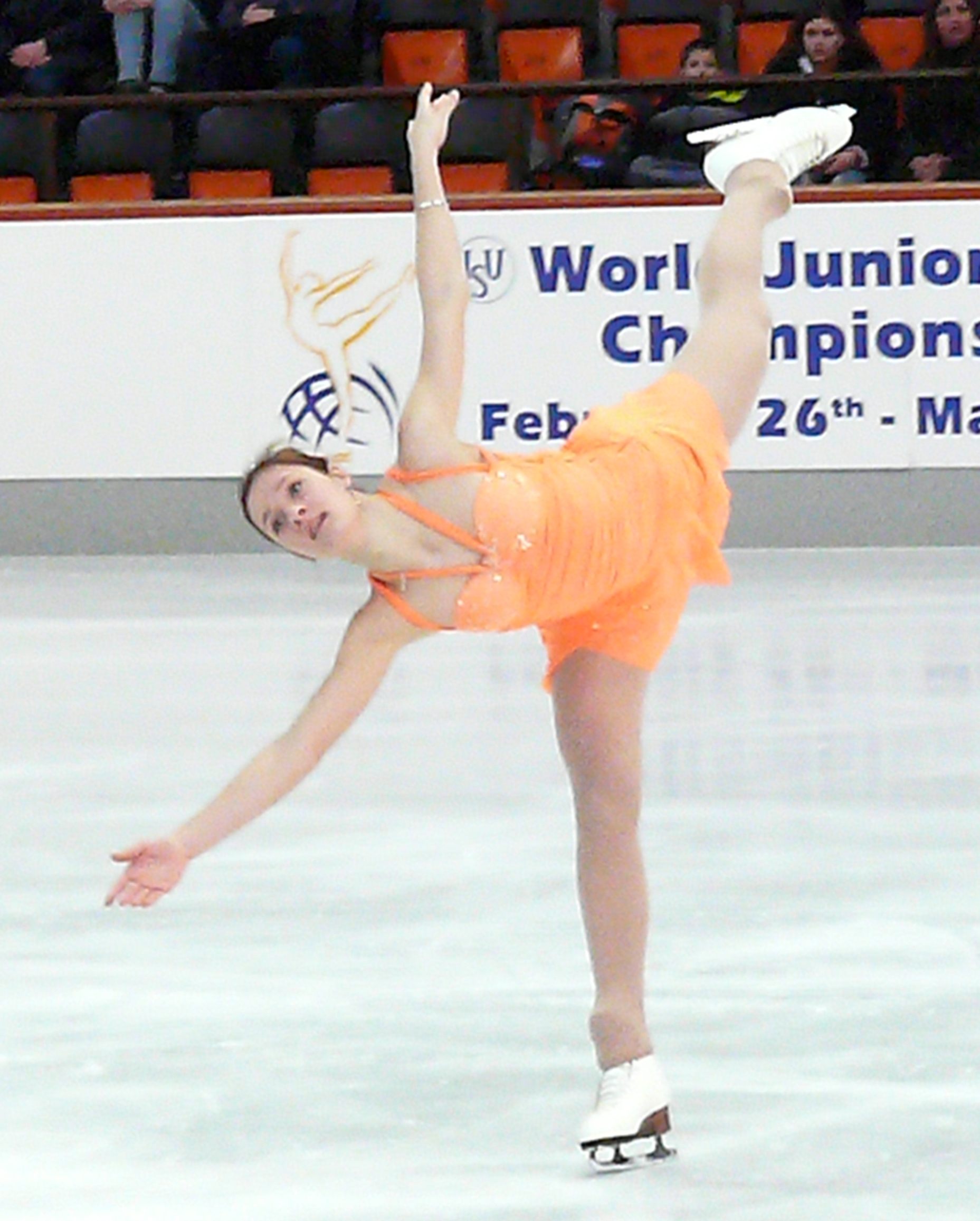
- Kristin Wieczorek in 2007.

Personal information
- Born: 2 May 1986 (age 40) Erfurt, East Germany
- Height: 1.73 m (5 ft 8 in)

Figure skating career
- Country: Germany
- Skating club: USG Chemnitz
- Began skating: 1991
- Retired: 2009

Kristin Wieczorek (born 2 May 1986) is a German former figure skater. She is the 2007 German national champion and qualified for the free skate at the 2007 European Championships.

== Career ==
Kristin Wieczorek began skating at the age of five in Erfurt, coached by Ilona Schindler. Later, she represented the USG Chemnitz club and was coached for some time by Anett Pötzsch.

In 2007, Wieczorek won the German senior national title. She was assigned to the 2007 European Championships, where she placed 19th, and the 2007 World Championships, where she finished 29th. Michael Huth became her coach in the summer of 2007.

In 2008, Wieczorek finished fourth at the German Championships. She ended her competitive career in 2009 and began working as a physiotherapist at a soccer club, SV Stahl Thale.

== Personal life ==
Kristin Wieczorek's younger brother Denis has also competed internationally in figure skating.

== Programs ==
Season	Short program	Free skating
2007–2008	Stray Cats Strut by Brian Setzer; Pink Panther by Henry Mancini	Tango; Bolero for Violin and Orchestra by Walter Taieb performed by Vanessa-Mae
2006–2007	Xotica by René Dupéré	Leyenda performed by Vanessa-Mae
2003–2004	Le Vent, le Cri (from Professional)	The Mask of Zorro by James Horner
2001–2002	Join Me Remix von Him	Speed II by Mark Mancina

== Competitive highlights ==
Results
International
Event	2000–01	2001–02	2002–03	2003–04	2004–05	2005–06	2006–07	2007–08	2008–09
Worlds							29th		
Europeans							19th		
GP Cup of Russia								11th	
Bofrost Cup					4th				
Finlandia Trophy								14th	
Golden Spin							5th		
Karl Schäfer							8th		9th
Nebelhorn Trophy				10th			7th	8th	10th
Ondrej Nepela			8th						
Bavarian Open						2nd		2nd	
Heiko Fischer		5th	7th	5th	3rd	6th			
International: Junior
JGP Czech Rep.		9th							
JGP Germany			15th		6th				
JGP Netherlands		7th							
National
German Champ.	12th	16th	11th	13th	5th	8th	1st	4th	
GP = Grand Prix; JGP = Junior Grand Prix
