= William Beier =

German ice dancer

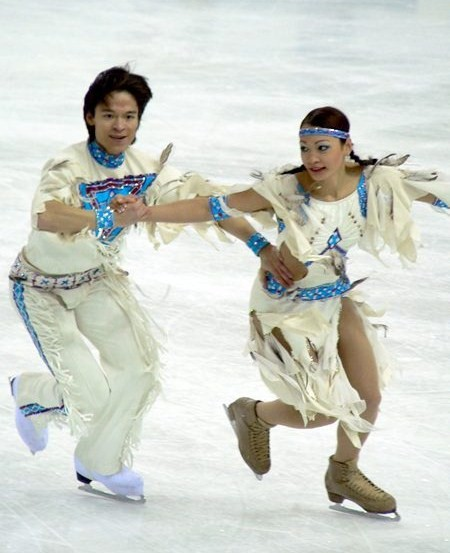
- William Beier (left) in 2005.

Personal information
- Born: November 2, 1982 (age 43) Manila, Philippines
- Height: 174 cm (5 ft 9 in)

Figure skating career
- Country: Germany
- Partner: Christina Beier
- Coach: Martin Skotnicky
- Skating club: TSC Eintracht Dortmund
- Retired: 2010

William Beier (born November 2, 1982, in Manila, Philippines) is a Filipino born German former competitive ice dancer. He competed with his sister, Christina Beier. They are four-time (2005–2006, 2008, 2010) German national champions, and represented Germany in the 2010 Winter Olympics.

The Beiers moved from the Philippines to Germany in 1990. William Beier began skating when he was eight. He was a singles skater for two years and then took up ice dancing with his sister, Christina Beier.

In 2004, the couple changed trainers and training facilities, training with Martin Skotnický in Oberstdorf.

In May 2008, the Beiers announced the end of their dance partnership. They teamed up again following the 2008-09 season and qualified for the Winter Olympics. The Beiers ended their competitive career in 2010.

== Competitive highlights ==
GP: Grand Prix; JGP: Junior Grand Prix

with Christina Beier

International
Event	99–00	00–01	01–02	02–03	03–04	04–05	05–06	07–08	09–10
Olympics									18th
Worlds						20th	13th		
Europeans					16th	15th	13th	15th	15th
GP Bompard							6th		
GP Cup of China					8th				
GP Skate America							7th		
GP Skate Canada					11th	7th			
Bofrost Cup						6th			
Finlandia									4th
Golden Spin								4th	
Ice Challenge									3rd
Karl Schäfer							3rd		
Nebelhorn							3rd	2nd	
Ondrej Nepela									2nd
International: Junior
Junior Worlds	15th		11th	5th					
JGP Final				4th					
JGP China				1st					
JGP Czech Rep.		5th							
JGP France				2nd					
JGP Norway		3rd							
JGP Poland			3rd						
JGP Slovenia	4th								
JGP Sweden	5th		4th						
EYOF				2nd					
National
German Champ.	2nd J	1st J	1st J		2nd	1st	1st	1st	1st
J = Junior level; WD = Withdrew; The Beiers did not compete together in the 2006–07 and 2008–09 seasons.
