= Christina Beier =

German ice dancer

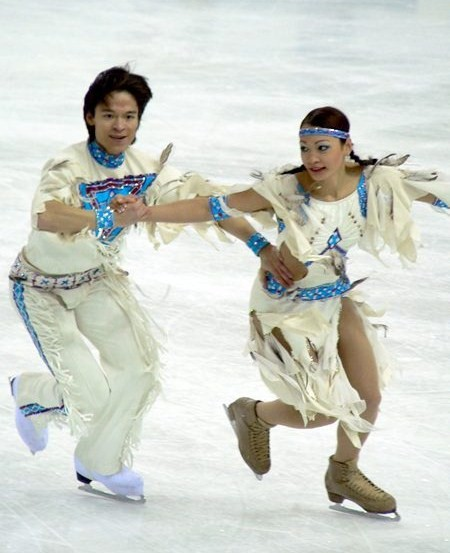
- Christina Beier (right) in 2005.

Personal information
- Born: June 9, 1984 (age 42) Manila, Philippines
- Height: 170 cm (5 ft 7 in)

Figure skating career
- Country: Germany
- Partner: William Beier
- Coach: Martin Skotnicky
- Skating club: TSC Eintracht Dortmund
- Retired: 2010

Christina Beier (born June 9, 1984 in Manila, Philippines) is a Filipino born German former competitive ice dancer. She competed with her brother William Beier. She briefly stopped competing with her brother and competed with partner Tim Giesen for one season. Beier and Beier are four-time (2005–2006, 2008, 2010) German national champions.

== Career ==
The Beiers moved from the Philippines to Germany in 1990. Christina Beier began skating when she was seven. She was a singles skater for two years and then took up ice dancing with her brother William Beier. They were the 2005–2006 and 2008 and 2010 German national champions.

They did not compete in 2006/2007 season because Christina was suffering from a foot injury. In February 2008 they withdrew from the 2008 World Championships because of injury.

In May 2008, the Beiers announced the end of their dance partnership. Christina Beier teamed up with Tim Giesen and began competing with him in the 2008–2009 season. She began competing with her brother again following that season. They trained for two weeks with Albena Denkova and Maxim Staviski but William Beier had a problem with his knees, which had troubled him since 2006. The Beiers ended their competitive career in 2010.

== Competitive highlights ==
GP: Grand Prix; JGP: Junior Grand Prix

=== With William Beier ===
International
Event	99–00	00–01	01–02	02–03	03–04	04–05	05–06	07–08	09–10
Olympics									18th
Worlds						20th	13th		
Europeans					16th	15th	13th	15th	15th
GP Bompard							6th		
GP Cup of China					8th				
GP Skate America							7th		
GP Skate Canada					11th	7th			
Bofrost Cup						6th			
Finlandia									4th
Golden Spin								4th	
Ice Challenge									3rd
Karl Schäfer							3rd		
Nebelhorn							3rd	2nd	
Ondrej Nepela									2nd
International: Junior
Junior Worlds	15th		11th	5th					
JGP Final				4th					
JGP China				1st					
JGP Czech Rep.		5th							
JGP France				2nd					
JGP Norway		3rd							
JGP Poland			3rd						
JGP Slovenia	4th								
JGP Sweden	5th		4th						
EYOF				2nd					
National
German Champ.	2nd J	1st J	1st J		2nd	1st	1st	1st	1st
J = Junior level; WD = Withdrew; The Beiers did not compete together in the 2006–07 and 2008–09 seasons.

=== With Tim Giesen ===
National
Event	2008–09
German Championships	4th
