= Martin Rappe =

German figure skater

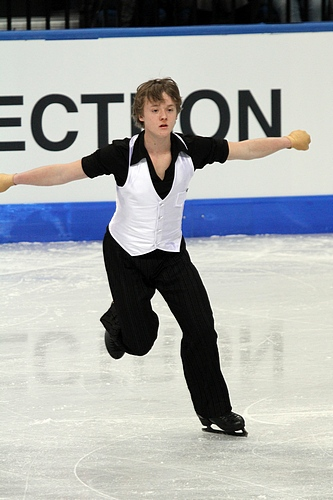
- Rappe in 2012

Personal information
- Born: 10 July 1993 (age 33) Chemnitz, Germany
- Height: 1.71 m (5 ft 7 1/2 in)

Figure skating career
- Country: Germany
- Coach: Viola Striegler
- Skating club: Chemnitz Skating Club
- Began skating: 1997

Martin Rappe (born 10 July 1993) is a German former figure skater. He is the 2014 CS Ice Challenge bronze medalist, 2014 Hellmut Seibt Memorial champion, 2012 Bavarian Open silver medalist, and 2012 German national bronze medalist. He competed at the 2012 and 2013 World Junior Championships, placing 11th both times.

== Programs ==
Season	Short program	Free skating
2013–14	The Cotton Club by John Barry; Chambermaid Swing by Parov Stelar	Prince of Persia by Harry Gregson-Williams; King Arthur by Hans Zimmer
2012–13	The Sicilian Clan by Ennio Morricone	Prince of Persia by Harry Gregson-Williams; King Arthur by Hans Zimmer
2011–12	The Sicilian Clan by Ennio Morricone	Backdraft by Hans Zimmer
2010–11	Smooth Criminal by Michael Jackson, David Garrett	Backdraft by Hans Zimmer

== Competitive highlights ==
International
Event	06–07	07–08	08–09	09–10	10–11	11–12	12–13	13–14	14–15	15–16
CS Ice Challenge									3rd	
Bavarian Open						2nd	11th			
Cup of Nice									10th	
Finlandia Trophy								11th		
Ice Challenge						5th	7th			
Nebelhorn Trophy								18th		
NRW Trophy								7th		13th
Seibt Memorial								1st		
Volvo Open Cup										3rd
Warsaw Cup								6th		
International: Junior
Junior Worlds						11th	11th			
JGP Belarus			13th							
JGP Czech Rep.					9th					
JGP Germany					13th					
JGP Italy						6th				
JGP Latvia						7th				
JGP USA							9th			
Bavarian Open					1st J					
Gardena		5th J								
Golden Bear		2nd J								
Ice Challenge					2nd J					
NRW Trophy				6th J						
National
German Champ.	7th J	5th J	5th J	1st J	1st J	3rd	4th	5th	4th	6th
