= Christopher Berneck =

German figure skater

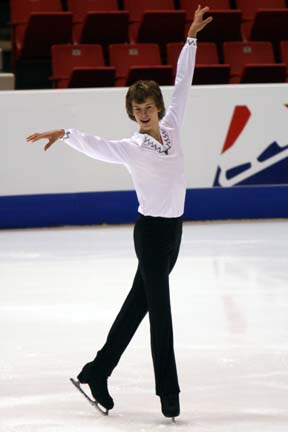
- Berneck at 2007 Junior Grand Prix at Lake Placid

Personal information
- Born: 10 July 1992 (age 34) Bad Säckingen, Germany
- Home town: Görwihl, Germany
- Height: 1.84 m (6 ft 1/2 in)

Figure skating career
- Country: Germany
- Coach: Doug Leigh, Robert Tebby, Lee Barkell, Priscilla Hill, Ronnie Biancosino
- Skating club: SC Berlin; TUS Eissport-Stuttgart; SC Riessersee; EHC Herrischried
- Began skating: 1998
- Retired: 2016

Christopher Berneck (born 10 July 1992) is a German figure skater. He won four senior international medals and became a two-time German national bronze medalist (2011, 2015).

== Personal life ==
Berneck was born on 10 July 1992 in Bad Säckingen, Germany. In 2015, he began studying fashion communication at Ryerson University in Toronto, Ontario, Canada.

== Career ==
Berneck started skating in 1998 at the ice rink in Herrischried, Black Forest, Germany. He initially competed for EHC Herrischried. In 1999, he and his family moved to Garmisch-Partenkirchen where he trained with Wolfgang Danne and Harold Williams. He represented SC Riessersee. During his time in Garmisch-Partenkirchen, Berneck competed in European Criterium events and won the 2001–02 cubs boys overall category, winning all three events he competed in, including the Hellmut Seibt Memorial, where U.S. skater Keegan Messing placed third in the same category.

In 2001, Berneck returned to his home town, Görwihl, and trained at the Stuttgart training center, competing for the TUS Eissport-Stuttgart, before moving to Berlin in 2003. He trained under Romy Oesterreich at the Sportforum Hohenschoenhausen until 2007, when the family moved to Wilmington, Delaware, United States. In June 2011, Berneck and his family moved to Barrie, Ontario, Canada. He then trained at the Mariposa International Training Center with Robert Tebby, Doug Leigh, Tugba Karademir, Steven Cousins, Lee Barkell and other coaches.

== Programs ==
Season	Short program	Free skating
2011–2012	El Tango de Roxanne (from Moulin Rouge!); Tango de los Exilados by Walter Taieb and Vanessa-Mae	Otonal by Raúl Di Blasio
2010–2011	El Tango de Roxanne (from Moulin Rouge!); Tango de los Exilados by Walter Taieb and Vanessa-Mae	Schindler's List by John Williams
2007–2008	Ladies in Lavender by Nigel Hess	Romeo and Juliet by Nino Rota

== Competitive highlights ==
International
Event	05–06	06–07	07–08	08–09	09–10	10–11	11–12	12–13	13–14	14–15
CS Autumn Classic										10th
CS Golden Spin										12th
Bavarian Open						3rd		7th		
Cup of Nice								11th		
Merano Cup								3rd		3rd
Nepela Trophy									7th	
NRW Trophy									8th	
Seibt Memorial									3rd	
U.S. Classic								12th		
International: Junior
JGP Australia							9th			
JGP Austria						15th				
JGP Croatia			8th							
JGP USA			7th							
Warsaw Cup		6th J								
National
German Champ.	7th J	6th J	3rd J	7th J	3rd J	3rd		5th	4th	3rd
