= Florian Just =

German pair skater

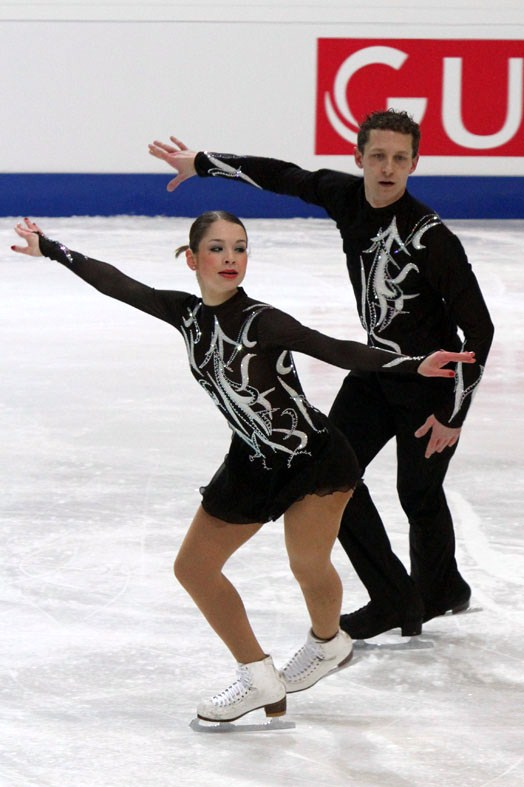
- Katharina Gierok and Florian Just at 2011 European Championships

Personal information
- Born: 28 February 1982 (age 44) Nürnberg, Bavaria, West Germany
- Height: 1.78 m (5 ft 10 in)

Figure skating career
- Country: Germany
- Skating club: Essener JE

Florian Just (born 28 February 1982 in Nürnberg) is a German former competitive pair skater. With Mari Vartmann, he won four senior international medals and finished seventh at two European Championships. He also won four international medals with Katharina Gierok.

== Career ==
=== Early career ===
Florian Just began ice skating at the age of five at EC Nürnberg while also practicing artistic roller skating. He appeared on the Junior Grand Prix (JGP) circuit as a single skater. During the 1999 JGP series, he won gold in Zagreb, Croatia, and placed fourth at his second assignment, in Ostrava, Czech Republic. He qualified for the JGP Final, where he finished seventh. He is the only German skater to reach the final in men's singles.

Just was coached by Sieglinde Ruppel and Steffi Ruttkies. He moved to Munich because of the better training available at the Münchener EV. He continued competing in men's singles for five more years before switching to pair skating in Berlin. His first partner was Mariana Kautz.

=== Partnership with Vartmann ===
In January 2004, Just teamed up with Mari-Doris Vartmann. They were coached originally by Julia Gnilozubova. In autumn 2004 they switched to Knut Schubert. They practiced in Dortmund and also in Berlin.

Vartmann/Just became three-time German national medalists and appeared at four ISU Championships, finishing 18th at the 2006 Worlds in Calgary, Alberta, Canada; 7th at the 2007 Europeans in Warsaw, Poland; 18th at the 2007 Worlds in Tokyo, Japan; and 7th at the 2008 Europeans in Zagreb, Croatia. They parted ways just after the 2009 NRW Trophy.

=== Partnership with Gierok ===
In spring 2010, Just teamed up with Katharina Gierok. Karel Fajfr served as the pair's coach. Gierok/Just won silver at the 2010 NRW Trophy and bronze at the 2010 Warsaw Cup. At 2011 German Nationals, they won the bronze medal and were selected to compete at the European Championships. They finished 11th in their debut at the event. Gierok and Just parted ways at the end of the 2011–12 season.

Just was a member of the club Essener Jugend-Eiskunstlauf Verein and a sport-soldier in the Bundeswehr.

== Programs ==
=== With Gierok ===
Season	Short program	Free skating
2011–12	Ratatouille	The Holiday by Hans Zimmer
2010–11	Dark Angel by Edvin Marton	The Holiday by Hans Zimmer

=== With Vartmann ===
Season	Short program	Free skating	Exhibition
2007–08	Shine On You Crazy Diamond by Pink Floyd	Memoirs of a Geisha by John Williams	
2006–07	Nyah (from Mission: Impossible II) by Hans Zimmer	The Promise by Klaus Badelt	
2005–06	Libertango by Astor Piazzolla performed by Bond	Once Upon a Time in America by Ennio Morricone	You're the One That I Want

=== Single skating ===
Season	Short dance	Free dance
2000–01	Etape	The Mask of Zorro by James Horner

== Competitive highlights ==
GP: Grand Prix; JGP: Junior Grand Prix

=== Pairs career with Gierok ===
International
Event	2010–11	2011–12
European Champ.	11th	
Bavarian Open	2nd	
Golden Spin		2nd
NRW Trophy	2nd	5th
Warsaw Cup	3rd	
National
German Champ.	3rd	

=== Pairs career with Vartmann ===
International
Event	04–05	05–06	06–07	07–08	08–09	09–10
Worlds		18th	18th			
Europeans			7th	7th		
GP Cup of China				WD		
GP NHK Trophy			8th			
Cup of Nice				3rd		4th
Finlandia Trophy				3rd		
Nebelhorn Trophy		6th	WD			
NRW Trophy					2nd	3rd
National
German Champ.	4th	4th	2nd	2nd	3rd	
WD = Withdrew

=== Singles career ===
Event	95–96	96–97	97–98	98–99	99–00	00–01	01–02
Junior Worlds						20th	
JGP Final					7th		
JGP Croatia					1st		
JGP Czech Republic					4th		
JGP Mexico						9th	
Golden Bear of Zagreb				2nd J			
German Champ.	9th J	16th J	14th	11th	5th	9th	6th
