= Denis Wieczorek =

German figure skater

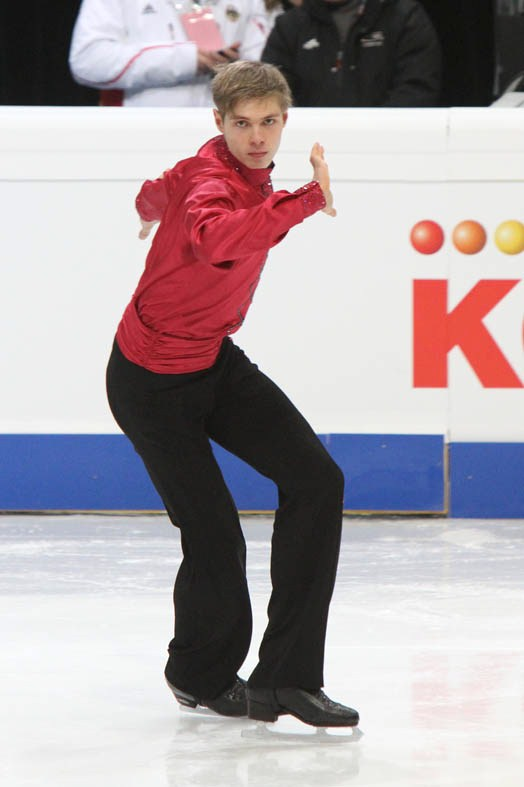
- Denis Wieczorek at the 2011 European Championships.

Personal information
- Full name: Denis Wieczorek
- Born: 22 August 1991 (age 35) Erfurt
- Home town: Kirchheim
- Height: 1.88 m (6 ft 2 in)

Figure skating career
- Country: Germany
- Coach: Ilona Schindler
- Skating club: ESC Erfurt

Denis Wieczorek (born 22 August 1991 in Erfurt) is a German figure skater. He is the 2011 German silver medalist. He placed 14th at the 2009 World Junior Championships and 22nd at the 2008 World Junior Championships. His older sister Kristin Wieczorek competed internationally on the senior level as well.

== Programs ==
Season	Short program	Free skating
2011–2012	Blues	Sherlock Holmes; Inception by Hans Zimmer
2010–2011	Sherlock Holmes by Helmut and Franz Vonlichten	Vantage Point by Atli Örvarsson
2008–2009	L'Odyssee de l'Espece by Yvan Cassar	Vantage Point by Atli Örvarsson
2007–2008	L'Odyssee de l'Espece by Yvan Cassar	National Treasure by Trevor Rabin

== Competitive highlights ==
International
Event	2006–07	2007–08	2008–09	2009–10	2010–11	2011–12	2012–13
Europeans					20th		
Bavarian Open					2nd	4th	
Coupe de Nice							13th
Merano Cup					9th		
NRW Trophy			1st J.	4th J.	7th	9th	
Gardena	4th						
International: Junior
Junior Worlds		22nd	14th		21st		
JGP Croatia		12th		12th			
JGP Czech			12th				
JGP Germany		21st		15th	15th		
JGP Great Britain					5th		
JGP Romania	17th						
JGP South Africa			9th				
National
German Champ.	4th	4th	3rd J.	5th	2nd	4th	6th
