= Martin Liebers =

German figure skater

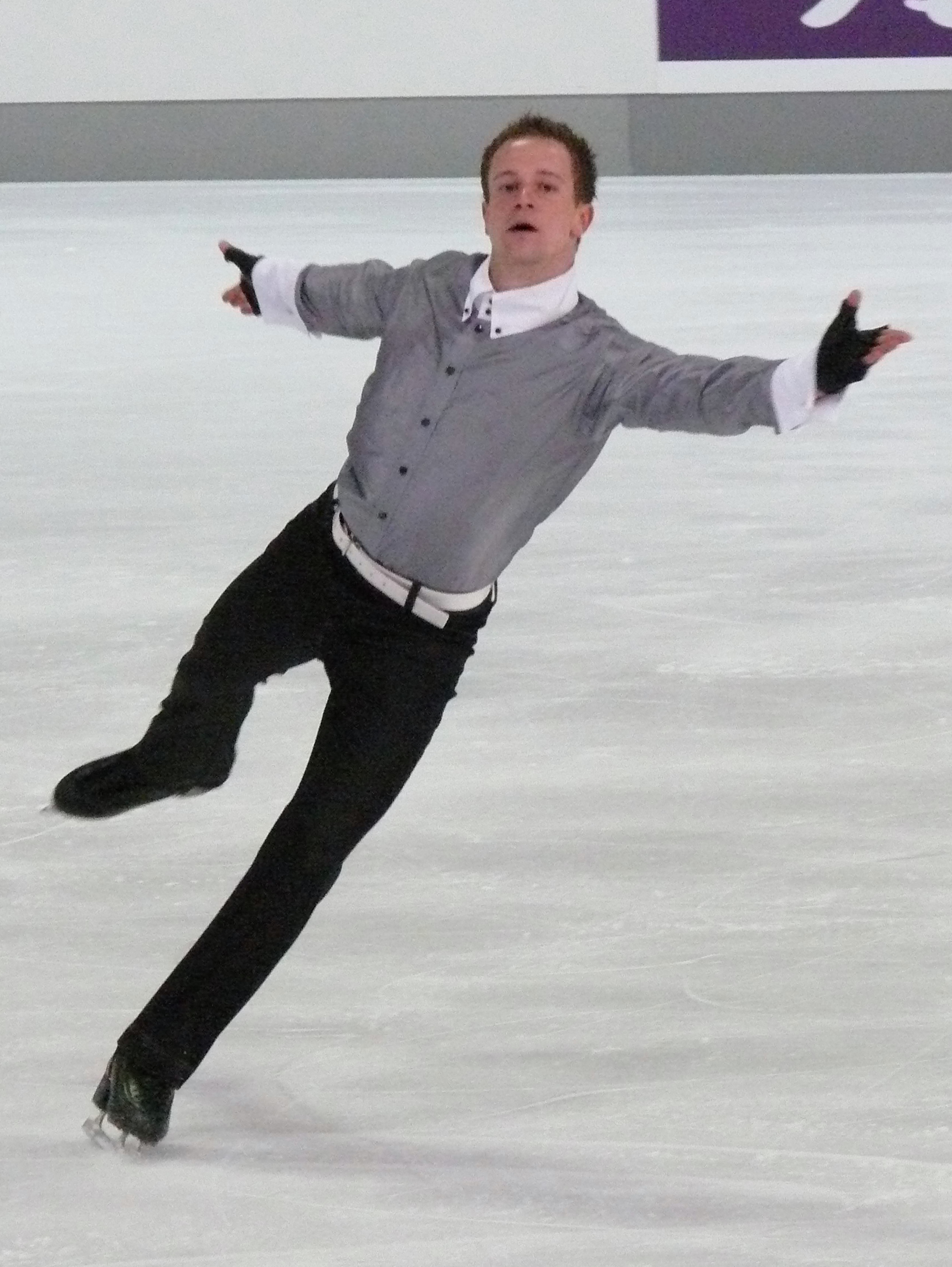
- Liebers in 2008

Personal information
- Full name: Martin Liebers
- Born: 22 June 1985 (age 41) Berlin
- Height: 1.77 m (5 ft 10 in)

Figure skating career
- Country: Germany
- Partner: Nicole Gurny
- Coach: Monika Scheibe; Viola Striegler
- Skating club: SC Berlin

Martin Liebers (born 22 June 1985) is a German former competitive figure skater. He is a four-time German national bronze medalist between 2005 and 2008, and was the Junior National Champion in 2000 and the Novice National Champion in 1997.

== Biography ==
Liebers was born in Berlin. His father, Mario Liebers, competed internationally for East Germany from 1976 to 1980, and his younger brother, Peter Liebers, is the 2009 German National Champion.

In 2009 he started training pairs. He partnered with Nicole Gurny and they are being coached by Monika Scheibe. In the 2009–2010 season he intended to compete in both singles and pairs.

== Competitive highlights ==
=== Pairs career ===
(with Nicole Gurny)

Event	2009-2010
German Championships	2nd
Nebelhorn Trophy	16th
Ondrej Nepela Memorial	5th

=== Singles career ===
==== Post-2004 ====
Event	2004-05	2005-06	2006-07	2007-08	2008-09	2009-10	2010-11
European Championships	20th						
German Championships	3rd	3rd	3rd	3rd	4th		4th
Karl Schäfer Memorial	10th		11th		4th		
Nebelhorn Trophy	12th	10th	8th	17th	17th		
NRW Trophy					6th		
Ondrej Nepela Memorial				7th	5th		
Winter Universiade					10th		
AEGON Challenge Cup				6th			
Coupe de Nice			4th	4th			
Crystal Skate of Romania				5th			
Golden Spin of Zagreb	2nd	12th	3rd				

==== Pre-2004 ====
Event	2000-2001	2001-2002	2002-2003	2003-2004
World Junior Championships		20th	11th	15th
German Championships	6th	5th	4th	4th
Nebelhorn Trophy				11th
JGP, Bulgaria				8th
JGP, Czech Republic		8th		6th
JGP, France			8th	
JGP, Canada			12th	
JGP, Italy		7th		
JGP, Germany	15th			
JGP, Ukraine	11th			

- JGP = Junior Grand Prix
