= 2022 German Figure Skating Championships =

- Type: National Championship
- Date: December 9–11, 2021 (S/J/N); December 17–19, 2021 (J/N)
- Season: 2021–22
- Location: Neuss (S/J/N); Dortmund (J/N)
- Venue: Eissporthalle Neuss (S/J/N); Eissportzentrum Westfalen (J/N)

Champions
- Men's singles: Paul Fentz (S); Louis Weissert (J)
- Women's singles: Nicole Schott (S); Olesya Ray (J)
- Pairs: Minerva Fabienne Hase / Nolan Seegert (S); Letizia Roscher / Luis Schuster (J)
- Ice dance: Jennifer Janse van Rensburg / Benjamin Steffan (S); Darya Grimm / Michail Savitskiy (J)
- Previous: 2021 German Championships
- Next: 2023 German Championships

The 2022 German Figure Skating Championships (German: Deutsche Meisterschaften im Eiskunstlaufen 2022) were held on December 9–11, 2021 at the Eissporthalle Neuss in Neuss. Skaters competed in the disciplines of men's and women's singles at the senior level and pair skating and ice dance at the senior, junior, and novice levels. Single skating competitions on the junior and novice levels were held on December 17–19, 202,1 at the Eissportzentrum Westfalen in Dortmund. The results of the national championships were among the criteria used to choose the German teams for the 2022 European Championships, 2022 Winter Olympics, 2022 European Youth Olympic Winter Festival, 2022 World Championships and 2022 Junior World Championships.

== Medalists ==
Senior
Discipline	Gold	Silver	Bronze
Men	Paul Fentz	Kai Jagoda	Nikita Starostin
Women	Nicole Schott	Kristina Isaev	Elisabeth Jäger
Pairs	Minerva Fabienne Hase / Nolan Seegert	Alisa Efimova / Ruben Blommaert	No other competitors
Ice dance	Jennifer Janse van Rensburg / Benjamin Steffan	Katharina Müller / Tim Dieck	Lara Luft / Maximilian Pfisterer
Junior
Discipline	Gold	Silver	Bronze
Men	Louis Weissert	Denis Gurdzhi	Arthur Mai
Women	Olesya Ray	Aya Hatakawa	Janne Salatzki
Pairs	Letizia Roscher / Luis Schuster	No other competitors	
Ice dance	Darya Grimm / Michail Savitskiy	Karla Maria Karl / Kai Hoferichter	Janne Kummer / Erik Kummer

== Senior results ==
=== Men's singles ===
Rank	Name	Total points	SP		FS	
1	Paul Fentz	206.84	1	71.42	1	135.42
2	Kai Jagoda	181.77	2	67.66	3	114.11
3	Nikita Starostin	178.94	4	57.65	2	121.29
4	Louis Weissert	160.31	3	63.34	4	96.97
5	Lotfi Sereir	133.82	5	51.61	5	82.21

=== Women's singles ===
Rank	Name	Total points	SP		FS	
1	Nicole Schott	178.75	1	59.75	1	119.00
2	Kristina Isaev	159.21	2	55.00	2	104.21
3	Elisabeth Jäger	116.47	3	36.09	3	80.38
4	Jennifer Fischer	87.81	5	28.89	4	58.92
5	Antonia Moarcas	87.66	4	32.04	5	55.62

=== Pair skating ===
Rank	Name	Total points	SP		FS	
1	Minerva Fabienne Hase / Nolan Seegert	197.64	1	68.94	1	128.70
2	Alisa Efimova / Ruben Blommaert	184.23	2	66.20	2	118.03

=== Ice dance ===
Rank	Name	Total points	RD		FD	
1	Jennifer Janse van Rensburg / Benjamin Steffan	179.07	1	70.49	1	108.58
2	Katharina Müller / Tim Dieck	177.11	2	68.65	2	108.46
3	Lara Luft / Maximilian Pfisterer	150.05	3	59.82	3	90.23
4	Viktoriia Lopusova / Asaf Kazimov	129.72	4	50.04	4	79.68

== Junior results ==
=== Men's singles ===
Rank	Name	Total points	SP		FS	
1	Louis Weissert	177.01	1	56.43	1	120.58
2	Denis Gurdzhi	160.86	2	54.74	2	106.12
3	Arthur Mai	151.15	6	46.15	3	105.00
4	Luca Fünfer	142.36	4	48.58	4	93.78
5	Hugo Herrmann	139.76	3	53.59	7	86.17
6	Leon Kraiczyk	134.10	5	47.11	6	86.99
7	Robert Weber	129.86	8	42.84	5	87.02
8	Loris Kraiczyk	129.84	7	44.86	8	84.98

=== Women's singles ===
Rank	Name	Total points	SP		FS	
1	Olesya Ray	148.11	2	47.55	1	100.56
2	Aya Hatakawa	126.54	8	42.66	2	83.88
3	Janne Salatzki	125.68	1	48.32	3	77.36
4	Anastasia Steblyanka	122.8	3	45.87	4	76.93
5	Marielen Hirling	119.04	5	43.57	5	75.47
6	Kama Schelewski	118.66	4	44.53	6	74.13
7	Anna Grekul	115.78	7	43.23	8	72.55
8	Ina Jungmann	113.93	11	40.82	7	73.11
9	Paula Beryak	113.46	9	41.88	9	71.58
10	Eva Balduzzi	109.63	10	41.34	11	68.29
11	Cecile Pauline Pfister	108.02	6	43.28	13	64.74
12	Fiona Wiens	104.55	13	38.72	12	65.83
13	Maike Pruss	100.54	16	36.48	14	64.06
14	Lea-Sophie Beck	99.58	15	36.69	15	62.89
15	Annika Kasel	98.34	17	35.68	16	62.66
16	Selina Wilhelm	97.61	22	29.11	10	68.5
17	Zoe Trafela	96.94	14	37.22	17	59.72
18	Alicia Schuster	96.58	12	38.84	19	57.74
19	Elena Papadopoulou	91.82	18	34.08	18	57.74
20	Mariella Wallner	89.5	19	32.94	20	56.56
21	Annika Görler	89.12	20	32.68	21	56.44
22	Eva Vlad	86.09	21	31.46	23	54.63
23	Clara Gladys	84.26	24	28.34	22	55.92
24	Katharina Weber	78.83	23	28.76	24	50.07

=== Pairs ===
Rank	Name	Total points	SP		FS	
1	Letizia Roscher / Luis Schuster	138.92	1	47.1	1	91.82

=== Ice dance ===
Rank	Name	Total points	RD		FD	
1	Darya Grimm / Michail Savitskiy	152.64	1	62.42	1	90.22
2	Karla Maria Karl / Kai Hoferichter	133.51	2	54.81	2	78.70
3	Janne Kummer / Erik Kummer	77.22	3	29.77	3	47.45

== International team selections ==
=== Winter Universiade ===
The 2021 Winter Universiade, originally scheduled for 21–31 January 2021 in Lucerne, Switzerland, was postponed to 11–21 December 2021 but finally it was cancelled definitively on 29 November 2021.

=== European Championships ===
The 2022 European Championships were held in Tallinn, Estonia from 10 to 16 January 2022. Germany's team was published on December 14, 2021.

	Men	Women	Pairs	Ice dancing
1	Paul Fentz	Nicole Schott	Minerva Fabienne Hase / Nolan Seegert	Katharina Müller / Tim Dieck
2	Nikita Starostin		Annika Hocke / Robert Kunkel	
3			Letizia Roscher / Luis Schuster	
Alt.	Kai Jagoda	Kristina Isaev		Jennifer Janse van Rensburg / Benjamin Steffan

=== Winter Olympics ===
The 2022 Winter Olympics was held in Beijing, China from 4 to 20 February 2022. Germany's team was published on January 19, 2022.

	Men	Women	Pairs	Ice dancing
1	Paul Fentz*	Nicole Schott	Minerva Fabienne Hase / Nolan Seegert	Katharina Müller / Tim Dieck

Names denoted with an asterisk (*) are skaters/teams eligible for the team event only.

=== European Youth Olympic Winter Festival ===
The 2022 European Youth Olympic Winter Festival, originally scheduled for 6–13 February 2021 in Vuokatti, Finland, was postponed to 11–18 December 2021 and then to 20–25 March 2022. The German entry was announced on March 10, 2022.

	Men
1	Arthur Mai

=== World Championships ===
The 2022 World Championships were held in Montpellier, France from 21 to 27 March 2022. Germany's team was published on February 28, 2022.

	Men	Women	Pairs	Ice dancing
1	Nikita Starostin	Nicole Schott	Minerva Fabienne Hase / Nolan Seegert	Jennifer Janse van Rensburg / Benjamin Steffan (withdrew)
Alt.		Kristina Isaev	Letizia Roscher / Luis Schuster	Katharina Müller / Tim Dieck

=== World Junior Championships ===
Commonly referred to as "Junior Worlds", the 2022 World Junior Championships were originally scheduled for 7–13 March 2022 in Sofia, Bulgaria before postponing to 13–17 April 2022 in Tallinn, Estonia. The German team was announced on March 10, 2022.

	Men	Women	Pairs	Ice dancing
1	Louis Weissert	Olesya Ray	Letizia Roscher / Luis Schuster	Darya Grimm / Michail Savitskiy
1st alt.	Luca Fünfer			Karla Maria Karl / Kai Hoferichter
2nd alt.	Denis Gurdzhi			
3rd alt.	Arthur Mai			
