= 2022 CS Warsaw Cup =

- Type: ISU Challenger Series
- Date: November 17 – 20
- Season: 2022–23
- Location: Warsaw, Poland
- Host: Polish Figure Skating Association
- Venue: Arena COS Torwar

Champions
- Men's singles: (France) Kévin Aymoz
- Women's singles: (Poland) Ekaterina Kurakova
- Pairs: (Australia) Anastasia Golubeva / Hektor Giotopoulos Moore
- Ice dance: (France) Loïcia Demougeot / Théo le Mercier
- Previous: 2021 CS Warsaw Cup
- Next: 2023 CS Warsaw Cup
- Previous CS: 2022 CS Ice Challenge
- Next CS: 2022 CS Golden Spin of Zagreb

The 2022 CS Warsaw Cup was held on November 17–20, 2022, in Warsaw, Poland. It was the ninth event of the 2022–23 ISU Challenger Series. Medals were awarded in men's singles, women's singles, pair skating, and ice dance.

== Entries ==
The International Skating Union published the full list of entries on October 26, 2022.

Country	Men	Women	Pairs	Ice dance
Australia			Anastasia Golubeva / Hektor Giotopoulos Moore	
Austria	Luc Maierhofer			
Canada			Tilda Alteryd / Gabriel Farand	Emmy Bronsard / Jacob Richmond
Cyprus		Marilena Kitromilis		
Czech Republic		Barbora Vránková	Federica Simioli / Alessandro Zarbo	
Estonia	Arlet Levandi	Gerli Liinamäe; Kristina Škuleta-Gromova		
Finland	Makar Suntsev; Valtter Virtanen	Janna Jyrkinen; Oona Ounasvuori		
France	Kévin Aymoz; Luc Economides; Xavier Vauclin	Maïa Mazzara; Léa Serna	Coline Keriven / Tom Bouvart; Oxana Vouillamoz / Flavien Giniaux	Loïcia Demougeot / Théo le Mercier; Marie Dupayage / Thomas Nabais
Germany	Denis Gurdzhi; Kai Jagoda; Louis Weissert	Kristina Isaev; Nicole Schott	Letizia Roscher / Luis Schuster	Jennifer Janse van Rensburg / Benjamin Steffan
Great Britain			Anastasia Vaipan-Law / Luke Digby	
Hong Kong	Kwun Hung Leung	Hiu Yau Chow		
Israel	Mark Gorodnitsky	Ella Chen		Mariia Nosovitskaya / Mikhail Nosovitskiy
Italy	Daniel Grassl; Raffaele Francesco Zich	Alessia Tornaghi	Lucrezia Beccari / Matteo Guarise; Rebecca Ghilardi / Filippo Ambrosini; Anna Valesi / Manuel Piazza	Victoria Manni / Carlo Röthlisberger
Latvia		Anastasija Konga; Angelīna Kučvaļska		Aurelija Ipolito / Luke Russell
Lithuania		Jogailė Aglinskytė; Aleksandra Golovkina		
Mongolia		Maral-Erdene Gansukh		
Philippines			Isabella Gamez / Alexander Korovin	
Poland	Vladimir Samoilov; Kornel Witkowski; Miłosz Witkowski	Karolina Białas; Ekaterina Kurakova; Laura Szczęsna		Jenna Hertenstein / Damian Binkowski; Olivia Oliver / Elliott Graham; Anastasia Polibina / Pavel Golovishnikov
South Africa			Julia Mauder / Johannes Wilkinson	
Sweden	Gabriel Folkesson			
Switzerland	Noah Bodenstein; Lukas Britschgi; Naoki Rossi	Sarina Joos; Livia Kaiser; Yasmine Kimiko Yamada		
Ukraine	Kyrylo Marsak; Ivan Shmuratko; Hlib Smotrov	Mariia Andriichuk	Violetta Sierova / Ivan Khobta	
United States	Daniel Martynov; Maxim Naumov			

=== Changes to preliminary assignments ===
Date	Discipline	Withdrew	Added	Ref.
October 27	Pairs	—N/a	(South Africa) Julia Mauder / Johannes Wilkinson	
November 3	Men	(Italy) Nikolaj Memola	(France) Kévin Aymoz	
November 3	Men	(Kazakhstan) Dias Jirenbayev	—N/a	
November 3	Women	(Kazakhstan) Bagdana Rakhishova	—N/a	
November 3	Women	(Latvia) Anete Lāce	—N/a	
November 12	Women	(Australia) Victoria Alcantara	—N/a	
November 12	Women	(Poland) Elżbieta Gabryszak	—N/a	
November 12	Women	(United States) Kate Wang	—N/a	
November 12	Pairs	(France) Océane Piegad / Denys Strekalin	—N/a	
November 14	Women	(Finland) Emmi Peltonen	—N/a	
November 16	Men	(Poland) Jakub Lofek	—N/a	
November 16	Women	(Italy) Marina Piredda	—N/a	
November 16	Pairs	(Sweden) Greta Crafoord / John Crafoord	—N/a	New Grand Prix assignment
November 17	Women	(Lithuania) Daria Afinogenova	—N/a	
November 17	Ice dance	(Lithuania) Paulina Ramanauskaitė / Deividas Kizala	—N/a	

== Results ==
=== Men's singles ===
Rank	Skater	Nation	Total points	SP		FS	
1st place, gold medalist(s)	Kévin Aymoz	France	258.02	1	89.60	2	168.42
2nd place, silver medalist(s)	Daniel Grassl	Italy	257.76	4	76.44	1	181.32
3rd place, bronze medalist(s)	Lukas Britschgi	Switzerland	253.66	2	86.51	3	167.15
4	Luc Economides	France	222.24	8	73.37	4	148.87
5	Maxim Naumov	United States	218.98	5	76.17	5	142.81
6	Vladimir Samoilov	Poland	212.79	3	77.69	6	135.10
7	Naoki Rossi	Switzerland	208.34	6	75.46	8	132.88
8	Daniel Martynov	United States	204.14	9	71.75	9	132.39
9	Mark Gorodnitsky	Israel	202.30	14	67.44	7	134.86
10	Luc Maierhofer	Austria	201.50	11	69.75	10	131.75
11	Kornel Witkowski	Poland	200.97	10	71.70	12	129.27
12	Ivan Shmuratko	Ukraine	199.65	7	74.41	16	125.24
13	Valtter Virtanen	Finland	198.48	13	67.94	11	130.54
14	Arlet Levandi	Estonia	195.72	12	69.45	14	126.27
15	Raffaele Francesco Zich	Italy	190.63	18	62.20	13	128.43
16	Xavier Vauclin	France	188.82	17	63.09	15	125.73
17	Miłosz Witkowski	Poland	181.70	15	66.23	18	115.47
18	Kyrylo Marsak	Ukraine	179.97	20	59.36	17	120.61
19	Hlib Smotrov	Ukraine	175.75	16	63.25	20	112.50
20	Noah Bodenstein	Switzerland	168.36	19	60.82	22	107.54
21	Makar Suntsev	Finland	167.31	21	59.35	21	107.96
22	Gabriel Folkesson	Sweden	162.23	25	48.73	19	113.50
23	Kai Jagoda	Germany	161.94	23	57.89	23	104.05
24	Denis Gurdzhi	Germany	148.66	24	49.80	24	98.86
25	Louis Weissert	Germany	145.71	22	59.03	25	86.68
26	Kwun Hung Leung	Hong Kong	123.62	26	38.59	26	85.03

=== Women's singles ===
Rank	Skater	Nation	Total points	SP		FS	
1st place, gold medalist(s)	Ekaterina Kurakova	Poland	189.98	1	64.66	1	125.32
2nd place, silver medalist(s)	Sarina Joos	Switzerland	180.31	3	58.76	2	121.55
3rd place, bronze medalist(s)	Janna Jyrkinen	Finland	174.96	2	62.35	4	112.61
4	Nicole Schott	Germany	172.56	5	52.94	3	119.62
5	Léa Serna	France	163.60	9	51.41	5	112.19
6	Livia Kaiser	Switzerland	157.57	6	51.85	7	105.72
7	Aleksandra Golovkina	Lithuania	157.42	4	55.49	9	101.93
8	Kristina Isaev	Germany	155.98	12	49.39	6	106.59
9	Oona Ounasvuori	Finland	152.14	15	47.47	8	104.67
10	Mariia Andriichuk	Ukraine	150.74	7	51.84	10	98.90
11	Gerli Liinamäe	Estonia	149.57	8	51.69	11	97.88
12	Anastasija Konga	Latvia	145.16	11	50.36	12	94.80
13	Ella Chen	Israel	138.04	13	48.21	15	89.83
14	Angelīna Kučvaļska	Latvia	137.89	10	51.10	17	86.79
15	Barbora Vránková	Czech Republic	137.87	21	43.62	13	94.25
16	Kristina Škuleta-Gromova	Estonia	136.93	18	46.43	14	90.50
17	Yasmine Kimiko Yamada	Switzerland	133.55	14	47.55	19	86.00
18	Karolina Białas	Poland	130.14	20	43.71	18	86.43
19	Marilena Kitromilis	Cyprus	128.30	24	39.32	16	88.98
20	Jogailė Aglinskytė	Lithuania	121.05	17	46.81	20	74.24
21	Alessia Tornaghi	Italy	118.58	19	45.77	21	72.81
22	Maïa Mazzara	France	112.96	16	47.03	24	65.93
23	Hiu Yau Chow	Hong Kong	112.28	23	39.91	22	72.37
24	Laura Szczęsna	Poland	110.07	22	42.42	23	67.65
25	Maral-Erdene Gansukh	Mongolia	85.03	25	28.50	25	56.53

=== Pairs ===
Rank	Team	Nation	Total points	SP		FS	
1st place, gold medalist(s)	Anastasia Golubeva / Hektor Giotopoulos Moore	Australia	185.53	2	63.62	1	121.91
2nd place, silver medalist(s)	Rebecca Ghilardi / Filippo Ambrosini	Italy	184.21	1	65.79	2	118.42
3rd place, bronze medalist(s)	Letizia Roscher / Luis Schuster	Germany	170.65	3	63.11	3	107.54
4	Lucrezia Beccari / Matteo Guarise	Italy	166.50	4	60.71	4	105.79
5	Anna Valesi / Manuel Piazza	Italy	153.89	7	53.15	5	100.74
6	Violetta Sierova / Ivan Khobta	Ukraine	153.39	5	53.65	6	99.74
7	Anastasia Vaipan-Law / Luke Digby	Great Britain	147.86	8	48.30	7	99.56
8	Oxana Vouillamoz / Flavien Giniaux	France	144.00	6	53.46	8	90.54
9	Federica Simoli / Alessandro Zarbo	Czech Republic	136.02	10	47.77	9	88.25
10	Tilda Alteryd / Gabriel Farand	Canada	133.61	9	47.93	10	85.68
11	Isabella Gamez / Alexander Korovin	Philippines	127.60	11	42.94	11	84.66
12	Coline Keriven / Tom Bouvart	France	109.58	12	38.99	12	70.59
13	Julia Mauder / Johannes Wilkinson	South Africa	87.94	13	33.83	13	54.11

=== Ice dance ===
Rank	Team	Nation	Total points	RD		FD	
1st place, gold medalist(s)	Loïcia Demougeot / Théo le Mercier	France	182.00	2	72.13	1	109.87
2nd place, silver medalist(s)	Jennifer Janse van Rensburg / Benjamin Steffan	Germany	181.50	1	72.58	2	108.92
3rd place, bronze medalist(s)	Marie Dupayage / Thomas Nabais	France	173.15	3	66.07	3	107.08
4	Victoria Manni / Carlo Röthlisberger	Italy	165.49	4	64.45	4	101.04
5	Anastasia Polibina / Pavel Golovishnikov	Poland	154.46	5	63.62	8	90.84
6	Olivia Oliver / Elliott Graham	Poland	153.65	6	60.77	7	92.88
7	Emmy Bronsard / Jacob Richmond	Canada	152.72	7	59.49	6	93.23
8	Mariia Nosovitskaya / Mikhail Nosovitskiy	Israel	152.00	8	56.56	5	95.44
9	Aurelija Ipolito / Luke Russell	Latvia	131.65	9	51.09	9	80.56
10	Jenna Hertenstein / Damian Binkowski	Poland	121.14	10	45.91	10	75.23
