= 2023 German Figure Skating Championships =

- Type: National Championship
- Date: January 5–7, 2023 (S/J/N); December 16-18, 2022 (J/N)
- Season: 2022–23
- Location: Oberstdorf
- Venue: Eissportzentrum Oberstdorf

Champions
- Men's singles: Nikita Starostin (S); Luca Fünfer (J)
- Women's singles: Nicole Schott (S); Olesya Ray (J)
- Pairs: Annika Hocke / Robert Kunkel (S); Sonja Löwenherz / Robert Löwenherz (J)
- Ice dance: Jennifer Janse van Rensburg / Benjamin Steffan (S); Darya Grimm / Michail Savitskiy (J)
- Previous: 2022 German Championships
- Next: 2024 German Championships

The 2023 German Figure Skating Championships (German: Deutsche Meisterschaften im Eiskunstlaufen 2023) were held on January 5–7, 2023 at the Eissportzentrum Oberstdorf in Oberstdorf. Skaters competed in the disciplines of men's and women's singles at the senior level and pair skating and ice dance at the senior, junior, and novice levels. Single skating competitions on the junior and novice levels were held on December 16-18, 2022 at the Eissportzentrum Oberstdorf in Oberstdorf.

The results of the national championships were among the criteria used to choose the German teams for the 2023 Winter University Games, 2023 European Youth Olympic Winter Festival, 2023 European Championships, 2023 Junior World Championships and 2023 World Championships.

== Medalists ==
Discipline	Gold	Silver	Bronze
Men	Nikita Starostin	Kai Jagoda	Lotfi Sereir
Women	Nicole Schott	Kristina Isaev	Elisabeth Jäger
Pairs	Annika Hocke / Robert Kunkel	Letizia Roscher / Luis Schuster	No other competitors
Ice dance	Jennifer Janse van Rensburg / Benjamin Steffan	Charise Matthaei / Max Liebers	No other competitors
Junior
Discipline	Gold	Silver	Bronze
Men	Luca Fünfer	Hugo Willi Herrmann	Alexander Vlascenko
Women	Olesya Ray	Valentina Andrianova	Anna Grekul
Pairs	Sonja Löwenherz / Robert Löwenherz	Aliyah Ackermann / Tobija Harms	Josephine Lossius / Artem Rotar
Ice dance	Darya Grimm / Michail Savitskiy	Karla Maria Karl / Kai Hoferichter	Alexia Kruk / Jan Eisenhaber

== Senior results ==
=== Men's singles ===
Rank	Name	Total points	SP		FS	
1	Nikita Starostin	226.69	2	70.26	1	156.43
2	Kai Jagoda	203.59	1	75.36	2	128.23
3	Lotfi Sereir	135.79	3	40.70	3	95.09
4	Mattis Böhm	108.23	4	35.12	4	72.11
5	Valentin Schellenberger	96.39	5	33.01	5	63.38

=== Women's singles ===
Rank	Name	Total points	SP		FS	
1	Nicole Schott	192.67	1	64.89	1	127.78
2	Kristina Isaev	166.58	2	51.30	2	115.28
3	Elisabeth Jäger	105.89	3	37.21	4	68.68
4	Eva Balduzzi	98.70	4	29.69	3	69.01

=== Pair skating ===
Rank	Name	Total points	SP		FS	
1	Annika Hocke / Robert Kunkel	193.88	1	72.73	1	121.15
2	Letizia Roscher / Luis Schuster	165.51	2	56.44	2	109.07

=== Ice dance ===
Rank	Name	Total points	RD		FD	
1	Jennifer Janse van Rensburg / Benjamin Steffan	188.53	1	74.85	1	113.68
2	Charise Matthaei / Max Liebers	170.52	2	68.34	2	102.18

== Junior results ==
=== Men's singles ===
Rank	Name	Total points	SP		FS	
1	Luca Fünfer	155.43	4	46.30	1	109.13
2	Hugo Willi Herrmann	146.24	2	53.39	2	92.85
3	Alexander Vlascenko	145.20	1	53.72	3	91.48
4	Tim England	141.63	3	53.25	4	88.38
5	Noah Leander Jüßen	115.20	5	39.05	5	76.15
WD	Robert Wildt	37.02	6	37.02		86.99

=== Women's singles ===
Rank	Name	Total points	SP		FS	
1	Olesya Ray	164.96	1	55.19	1	109.77
2	Valentina Andrianova	142.96	2	52.39	2	90.57
3	Anna Grekul	122.07	5	40.96	3	81.11
4	Julia Grabowski	119.40	7	39.04	4	80.36
5	Sarah Pesch	118.29	4	43.64	6	74.65
6	Ina Jungmann	115.54	6	40.17	5	75.37
7	Hanna Keiß	112.68	3	44.30	7	68.38
8	Melina Jolin Scheck	101.00	12	34.95	8	66.05
9	Gillian Armstrong	100.98	10	36.00	9	64.98
10	Kira Thurner	98.88	8	37.13	12	61.75
11	Zoe Trafela	97.90	11	35.78	11	62.12
12	Leah-Sophie Beck	95.06	13	33.79	13	61.27
13	Louisa Brand	90.94	14	31.40	14	59.54
14	Taisiia Mysko	90.79	9	36.21	17	54.58
15	Valentina Arevalo-Sternhuber	90.69	17	26.99	10	63.70
16	Eva Vlad	86.87	16	29.67	15	57.20
17	Sophia Kaspirowitsch	86.77	15	30.73	16	56.04
18	Rebecca Breest	80.31	18	26.70	18	53.61

=== Pair skating ===
Rank	Name	Total points	SP		FS	
1	Sonja Löwenherz / Robert Löwenherz	120.51	1	44.63	2	75.88
2	Aliyah Ackermann / Tobija Harms	119.98	2	42.83	1	77.15
3	Josephine Lossius / Artem Rotar	116.18	3	41.66	3	74.52
4	Sofia Krause / Albert Loor	110.81	4	39.48	4	71.33

=== Ice dance ===
Rank	Name	Total points	RD		FD	
1	Darya Grimm / Michail Savitskiy	168.06	1	66.16	1	101.90
2	Karla Maria Karl / Kai Hoferichter	155.82	2	60.01	2	95.81
3	Alexia Kruk / Jan Eisenhaber	138.18	3	52.93	3	85.25
4	Finja Luisa Maeder / Piero Joel Lopez Moreno	126.10	4	48.60	4	77.50
WD	Savenna Pache / Korbinian Steinsailer	37.49				

== International team selections ==
=== Winter University Games ===
The 2023 Winter University Games were held in Lake Placid, United States from January 13–16, 2023. The German team was announced on December 14, 2022.

	Men	Ice dance
1	Kai Jagoda	Charise Matthaei / Max Liebers

=== European Youth Olympic Winter Festival ===
The 2023 European Youth Olympic Winter Festival was held in Friuli-Venezia Giulia, Italy, from 21 to 28 January 2023. The German entries were announced on January 11, 2023.

	Men	Women
1	Hugo Willi Hermann	Olesya Ray

=== European Championships ===
The 2023 European Championships were held in Espoo, Finland, from 25 to 29 January 2023. Germany's team was announced on January 7, 2023.

	Men	Women	Pairs	Ice dance
1	Nikita Starostin	Nicole Schott	Annika Hocke / Robert Kunkel	Jennifer Janse van Rensburg / Benjamin Steffan
2			Alisa Efimova / Ruben Blommaert	
1st alt.	Kai Jagoda	Kristina Isaev	Letizia Roscher / Luis Schuster	Lara Luft / Maximilian Pfisterer
2nd alt.				Charise Matthaei / Max Liebers

=== World Junior Championships ===
The 2023 World Junior Championships were held in Calgary, Canada, from February 27 – March 5, 2023. The list of entries was published on February 7, 2023.

	Men	Women	Pairs	Ice dance
1	Hugo Willi Herrmann	Olesya Ray	Aliyah Ackermann / Tobija Harms	Darya Grimm / Michail Savitskiy
2			Sonja Löwenherz / Robert Löwenherz	Karla Maria Karl / Kai Hoferichter
Alt.	Luca Fünfer	Valentina Andrianova		Alexia Kruk / Jan Eisenhaber

=== World Championships ===
The 2023 World Championships were held in Saitama, Japan, from March 20–26, 2023. The International Skating Union published a complete list of entries on February 28, 2023.

	Men	Women	Pairs	Ice dance
1	Nikita Starostin	Kristina Isaev	Alisa Efimova / Ruben Blommaert	Jennifer Janse van Rensburg / Benjamin Steffan
2		Nicole Schott	Annika Hocke / Robert Kunkel	
1st alt.	Kai Jagoda		Letizia Roscher / Luis Schuster	Lara Luft / Maximilian Pfisterer
2nd alt.				Charise Matthaei / Max Liebers
