= 2025 German Figure Skating Championships =

Figure skating competition

- Type: National championships
- Date: December 16 – 21, 2024
- Season: 2024–25
- Location: Oberstdorf
- Host: German Ice Skating Union
- Venue: Eissportzentrum Oberstdorf

Champions
- Men's singles: Nikita Starostin (Senior) & Genrikh Gartung (Junior)
- Women's singles: Kristina Isaev (Senior) & Anna Gerke (Junior)
- Pairs: Minerva Fabienne Hase and Nikita Volodin (Senior) & Aliyah Ackermann and Tobija Harms (Junior)
- Ice dance: Jennifer Janse van Rensburg and Benjamin Steffan (Senior) & Darya Grimm and Michail Savitskiy (Junior)
- Synchronized skating: Team Berlin 1 (Senior) & Team Berlin Juniors (Junior)
- Previous: 2024 German Championships
- Next: 2026 German Championships

The 2025 German Figure Skating Championships (German: Deutsche Meisterschaften im Eiskunstlaufen 2025) were held from December 16–21, 2024, at the Eissportzentrum Oberstdorf in Oberstdorf. Medals were awarded in men's singles, women's singles, pair skating, ice dance, and synchronized skating at the senior, junior, and novice levels. The results were part of the selection criteria for the 2025 European Championships, 2025 World Championships, and 2025 World Junior Championships.

== Medal summary ==
=== Senior ===
Discipline	Gold	Silver	Bronze
Men	Nikita Starostin	Luca Fünfer	Kai Jagoda
Women	Kristina Isaev	Sarah Pesch	Anna Grekul
Pairs	Minerva Fabienne Hase; Nikita Volodin	Letizia Roscher; Luis Schuster	—N/a
Ice dance	Jennifer Janse van Rensburg; Benjamin Steffan	Charise Matthaei; Max Liebers	Karla Maria Karl; Kai Hoferichter
Synchronized skating	Team Berlin 1	Team United Angels	Team Skating Graces Senior

=== Junior ===
Discipline	Gold	Silver	Bronze
Men	Genrikh Gartung	Robert Wildt	Hugo Willi Herrmann
Women	Anna Gerke	Julia Grabowski	Ina Jungmann
Pairs	Aliyah Ackermann; Tobija Harms	Sonja Löwenherz; Robert Löwenherz	—N/a
Ice dance	Darya Grimm; Michail Savitskiy	Alexia Kruk; Jan Eisenhaber	Lilia Schubert; Nikita Remeshevskiy
Synchronized skating	Team Berlin Juniors	Team Munich Destiny	—N/a

== Senior results ==
=== Men's singles ===
Men's results
Rank	Skater	Total points	SP		FS	
1st place, gold medalist(s)	Nikita Starostin	220.01	1	72.99	1	147.02
2nd place, silver medalist(s)	Luca Fünfer	193.26	2	61.46	2	131.80
3rd place, bronze medalist(s)	Kai Jagoda	186.48	3	59.51	3	126.97
4	Arthur Wolfgang Mai	166.15	4	51.45	4	114.70
5	Tim England	151.94	5	51.43	5	100.51
6	Christian Franz	113.15	6	32.89	6	80.26
7	Mattis Böhm	95.07	7	30.30	7	64.77

=== Women's singles ===
Women's results
Rank	Skater	Total points	SP		FS	
1st place, gold medalist(s)	Kristina Isaev	154.92	2	53.37	1	101.55
2nd place, silver medalist(s)	Sarah Pesch	136.62	1	56.00	4	80.62
3rd place, bronze medalist(s)	Anna Grekul	131.36	3	49.50	3	81.86
4	Elisabeth Jäger	122.33	4	39.52	2	82.81
5	Zoe Trafela	102.61	5	34.59	5	68.02

=== Pairs ===
Pairs' results
Rank	Team	Total points	SP		FS	
1st place, gold medalist(s)	Minerva Fabienne Hase; Nikita Volodin	199.53	1	70.35	1	129.18
2nd place, silver medalist(s)	Letizia Roscher; Luis Schuster	165.73	2	59.56	2	106.17

=== Ice dance ===
Ice dance results
Rank	Team	Total points	RD		FD	
1st place, gold medalist(s)	Jennifer Janse van Rensburg; Benjamin Steffan	191.68	1	76.06	1	115.62
2nd place, silver medalist(s)	Charise Matthaei; Max Liebers	177.68	2	70.79	2	106.89
3rd place, bronze medalist(s)	Karla Maria Karl; Kai Hoferichter	161.08	3	61.89	3	99.19

=== Synchronized skating ===
Synchronized skating results
Rank	Team	Total points	SP		FS	
1st place, gold medalist(s)	Team Berlin 1	195.47	1	67.59	1	127.88
2nd place, silver medalist(s)	Team United Angels	162.27	2	57.25	3	109.78
3rd place, bronze medalist(s)	Team Skating Graces Senior	160.51	3	50.73	2	105.02

== Junior results ==
=== Men's singles ===
Men's results
Rank	Skater	Total points	SP		FS	
1st place, gold medalist(s)	Genrikh Gartung	207.07	1	64.59	1	142.48
2nd place, silver medalist(s)	Robert Wildt	166.56	3	58.36	2	108.20
3rd place, bronze medalist(s)	Hugo Willi Herrmann	156.61	2	58.95	3	97.66
4	Richard Alexander von Göler	140.70	5	44.07	4	96.63
5	Patrick Chau	125.25	6	43.70	5	81.55
6	Leon Rojkov	122.07	4	51.82	7	70.25
7	Alexander Vlascenko	120.98	7	42.67	6	78.31

=== Women's singles ===
Women's results
Rank	Skater	Total points	SP		FS	
1st place, gold medalist(s)	Anna Gerke	161.95	1	60.54	1	101.41
2nd place, silver medalist(s)	Julia Grabowski	133.43	4	46.02	2	87.41
3rd place, bronze medalist(s)	Ina Jungmann	124.37	2	46.35	5	78.02
4	Sophie Erhardt	124.36	6	44.88	4	79.48
5	Jara Wabner	120.64	10	38.78	3	81.86
6	Kira Thurner	120.58	5	45.30	6	75.28
7	Katharina Vialichka	116.75	7	43.63	8	73.12
8	Sophie Knorn	115.37	3	46.08	10	69.29
9	Vivian Wasserloos	114.23	8	40.50	7	73.73
10	Rebecca Breest	108.32	9	39.48	11	68.84
11	Annette Meyer	108.04	11	37.76	9	70.28
12	Valentina Arevalo-Sternhuber	105.85	13	37.60	12	68.25
13	Johanna Weber	104.77	14	37.56	15	67.21
14	Maya Werner	104.40	18	36,35	13	68.05
15	Anna Haberling	102.62	21	34.65	14	67.97
16	Smilla Erlebach	98.84	19	35.16	16	63.68
17	Celine Hagedorn	97.76	16	36.61	17	61.15
18	Sasha Tandogan	96.02	12	37.66	19	58.36
19	Emilia Poznyakovskaya	94.61	20	34.71	18	59.90
20	Timea Schlichting	94.01	17	36.35	21	57.66
21	Mia Elaine Muth	93.36	15	37.22	23	56.14
22	Hannah Rönitz	90.24	25	32.53	20	57.71
23	Antonia Weber	88.12	24	33.18	24	54.94
24	Mara Börner	87.93	22	33.89	25	54.04
25	Eloa-Sophie Unger	85.99	23	33.77	27	52.22
26	Lea Schumann	84.77	28	28.03	22	56.74
27	Anastasia Fomchenkova	83.44	26	31.71	28	51.73
28	Vanessa Hussak	81.77	27	28.29	26	53.48
WD	Stella Wiedermann	WD	29	24.35	Withdrew from competition	

=== Pairs ===
Pairs' results
Rank	Team	Total points	SP		FS	
1st place, gold medalist(s)	Aliyah Ackermann; Tobija Harms	118.04	1	42.10	1	75.94
2nd place, silver medalist(s)	Sonja Löwenherz; Robert Löwenherz	110.23	2	40.03	2	70.20

=== Ice dance ===
Ice dance results
Rank	Team	Total points	RD		FD	
1st place, gold medalist(s)	Darya Grimm; Michail Savitskiy	160.53	1	69.85	1	90.68
2nd place, silver medalist(s)	Alexia Kruk; Jan Eisenhaber	144.50	2	59.02	3	85.48
3rd place, bronze medalist(s)	Lilia Schubert; Nikita Remeshevskiy	140.36	4	51.54	2	88.82
4	Enikö Kobor; Zoard Kobor	132.95	3	56.33	5	76.62
5	Nelly Elisa Hemcke; Artyom Sladkov	126.76	5	48.71	4	78.05
6	Mia Lee Mayer; Tudor-Dominic Andrei	109.22	6	41.97	6	67.25

=== Synchronized skating ===
Synchronized skating results
Rank	Team	Total points	SP		FS	
1st place, gold medalist(s)	Team Berlin Juniors	121.48	1	42.40	1	79.08
2nd place, silver medalist(s)	Team Munich Destiny	91.88	2	30.05	2	61.83
