= 2021 German Figure Skating Championships =

- Type: National Championship
- Date: December 18–19, 2020
- Season: 2020–21
- Location: Dortmund
- Venue: Eissportzentrum Westfalen

Champions
- Men's singles: Denis Gurdzhi (S)
- Ladies' singles: Aya Hatakawa (S)
- Pairs: Letizia Roscher / Luis Schuster (J)
- Ice dance: Katharina Müller / Tim Dieck (S); Anne-Marie Wolf / Max Liebers (J)
- Previous: 2020 German Championships
- Next: 2022 German Championships

The 2021 German Figure Skating Championships (German: Deutsche Meisterschaften im Eiskunstlaufen 2021) were held on December 18–19, 2020 at the Eissportzentrum Westfalen in Dortmund. Skaters competed in the disciplines of men's and women's singles at the senior level, pair skating at the junior level, and ice dance at the senior, junior, and novice levels. Single skating competitions on the junior and novice levels were supposed to be held on March 28–29, 2021 in Dortmund, but were cancelled on March 18, 2021.

The results of the national championships were among the criteria used to choose the German teams for the 2021 World Championships.

== Impact of the COVID-19 pandemic ==
The Junior and Novice Single skating competition was initially planned for December 11–13, 2020. On November 5, 2020, it was postponed until January 7–10, 2021. After the development of COVID-19 cases after the holidays, it was once again rescheduled for March 28–29, 2021. On March 18, 2021, the comptiiton was officially cancelled.

The Senior competition was originally scheduled to be held in Hamburg and was then moved to Dortmund in December 2020 due to the COVID-19 restrictions in place in Hamburg. The starter field was reduced in size, as skaters training at the national sports base in Oberstdorf were unable to train for extensive periods of time due to the expansive quarantine rules in Bavaria, and thus did not take part in the 2021 German Figure Skating Championships. Additionally, skaters belonging to the Berlin Ice Sport Association were not allowed to attend the competition after health concerns had been raised by the association.

== Medalists ==
Senior
Discipline	Gold	Silver	Bronze
Men	Denis Gurdzhi	Louis Weissert	Fabian Piontek
Women	Aya Hatakawa	Nathalie Weinzierl	Dora Hus
Ice dance	Katharina Müller / Tim Dieck	No other competitors	
Junior
Discipline	Gold	Silver	Bronze
Pairs	Letizia Roscher / Luis Schuster	Josephine Lossius / Niclas Rust	No other competitors
Ice dance	Anne-Marie Wolf / Max Liebers	Lilia Charlene Schubert / Kieren Wagner	No other competitors

== Senior results ==
=== Men's singles ===
Rank	Name	Total points	SP		FS	
1	Denis Gurdzhi	180.81	1	65.98	1	114.83
2	Louis Weissert	177.43	2	63.80	2	113.63
3	Fabian Piontek	148.87	3	54.52	3	94.35

=== Women's singles ===
Rank	Name	Total points	SP		FS	
1	Aya Hatakawa	162.87	2	55.60	1	107.27
2	Nathalie Weinzierl	159.73	1	58.22	2	101.51
3	Dora Hus	149.39	3	53.81	3	95.58
4	Elisabeth Jäger	98.11	4	36.45	4	61.66
WD	Nargiz Süleymanova	withdrew		35.89	withdrew from competition	

=== Ice dance ===
Rank	Name	Total points	RD		FD	
1	Katharina Müller / Tim Dieck	192.10	1	76.38	1	115.72

== Junior results ==
=== Pairs ===
Rank	Name	Total points	SP		FS	
1	Letizia Roscher / Luis Schuster	126.98	1	42.32	1	84.66

=== Ice dance ===
Rank	Name	Total points	RD		FD	
1	Anne-Marie Wolf / Max Liebers	136.18	1	53.86	1	82.32
2	Lilia Charlene Schubert / Kieren Wagner	113.65	2	47.01	2	66.64

== International team selections ==
=== World Championships ===
Germany's team for the 2021 World Championships was published on 4 February 2021.

	Men	Women	Pairs	Ice dance
1	Paul Fentz	Nicole Schott	Minerva Fabienne Hase / Nolan Seegert (withdrew)	Katharina Müller / Tim Dieck
2			Annika Hocke / Robert Kunkel	
Alt.		Kristina Isaev		Jennifer Janse van Rensburg / Benjamin Steffan
