= Charise Matthaei =

German ice dancer (born 2000)

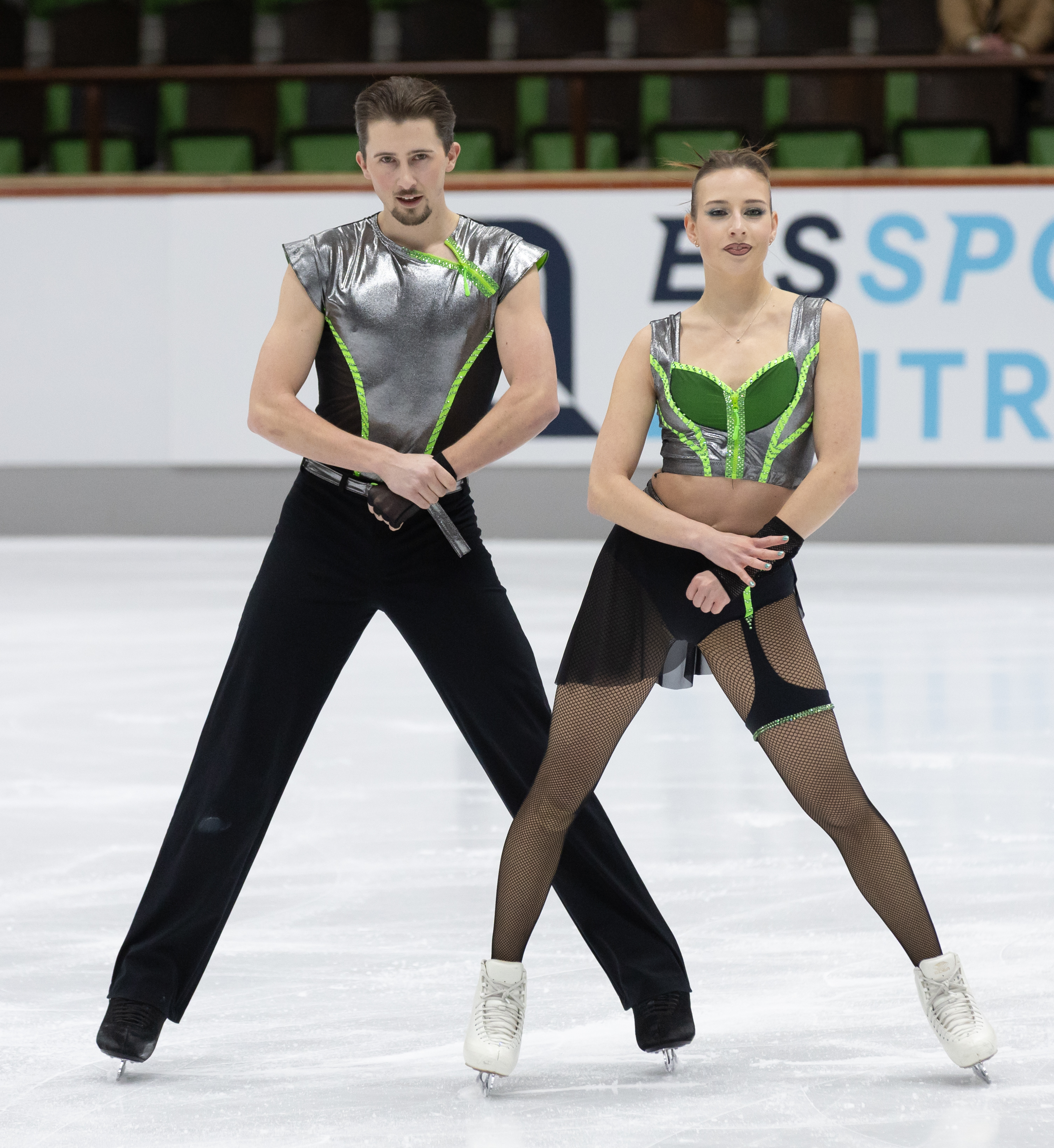
- Charise Matthaei and Max Liebers in 2025

Personal information
- Born: 19 October 2000 (age 26) Berlin, Germany
- Home town: Berlin
- Height: 1.71 m (5 ft 7 in)

Figure skating career
- Country: Germany
- Discipline: Ice dance
- Partner: Max Liebers
- Coach: Barbara Fusar-Poli; Roberto Pelizzola
- Skating club: Chemnitzer Eislauf-Club e.V.
- Began skating: 2003

Medal record
German Championships
Silver medal – second place	2023 Oberstdorf	Ice dance
Silver medal – second place	2024 Berlin	Ice dance
Silver medal – second place	2025 Oberstdorf	Ice dance
Silver medal – second place	2026 Oberstdorf	Ice dance

Charise Matthaei (born 19 October 2000) is a German ice dancer. With her former skating partner, Maximilian Pfisterer, she is a two-time German national junior champion and competed in the final segment at two World Junior Championships (2018, 2019). They placed 11th at the 2016 Winter Youth Olympics in Hamar, Norway. Since May 2022 she competes with her skating partner, Max Liebers, at the senior level in ice dance. With Liebers, she is a four-time German national Vice-champion (2023–26).

Matthaei/Pfisterer teamed up in August 2015 and split in 2019. Then she retired from competitive skating in 2019, but came back to skate with Liebers in May 2022.

== Programs ==
=== Ice dance with Max Liebers ===
Season	Rhythm dance	Free dance
2025–2026	Freed from Desire by Gala, Maurizio Molella, & Phil Jay; Passion (Of Your Passion) (12" Mix) by Gat Decor; Freed from Desire by Gala, Maurizio Molella, & Phil Jay choreo. by Barbara Fusar-Poli	Experience (Solo Piano); Experience (In a Time Lapse) by Ludovico Einaudi; Circles (based on Ludovico Einaudi Experience) by Ludovico Einaudi & Greta Svabo Bech; Experience (Starkey Remix) by Ludovico Einaudi, I Virtuosi Italiani, & Starkey choreo. by Barbara Fusar-Poli, Roberto Pelizzola, Lukas Csolley
2024–2025	On the Radio – Long Version; Hot Stuff – 12" Version by Donna Summer; No More Tears (Enough Is Enough) – 12" Version by Donna Summer & Barbra Streisand choreo. by Barbara Fusar-Poli, Roberto Pelizzola, Lukas Csolley	Experience (Solo Piano); Experience (In a Time Lapse) by Ludovico Einaudi; Circles (based on Ludovico Einaudi Experience) by Ludovico Einaudi & Greta Svabo Bech; Experience (Starkey Remix) by Ludovico Einaudi, I Virtuosi Italiani, & Starkey choreo. by Barbara Fusar-Poli, Roberto Pelizzola, Lukas Csolley
2023–2024	Pump Up the Jam by Technotronic; Sexual Healing by Marvin Gaye; Get Up! (Before the Night Is Over) by Technotronic choreo. by Barbara Fusar-Poli, Roberto Pelizzola, Lukas Csolley	Eleanor Rigby by The Beatles performed by Frankie Moreno, Joshua Bell, & Cody Fry choreo. by Barbara Fusar-Poli, Roberto Pelizzola, Lukas Csolley
2022–2023	Samba: Nectar and Ambrosia by Zoey & Aloé; Rhumba: Online by De-Phazz; Samba: Rescue Me by Zoey & Aloé choreo. by Barbara Fusar-Poli, Roberto Pelizzola, Lukas Csolley	Good Bye, Lenin!; Summer 78 by Yann Tiersen & Claire Pichet; Watching Lara; The Decant Session; The Deutsch Mark Is Coming by Yann Tiersen choreo. by Barbara Fusar-Poli, Roberto Pelizzola, Lukas Csolley

=== Ice dance with Maximilian Pfisterer ===
Season	Rhythm dance	Free dance
2018–2019	Flamenco: Spanish Flame by Maxime Rodriguez; Argentine tango: Tango d'Amor; Flamenco: Farrucas by Pepe Romero choreo. by Barbara Fusar-Poli	Bonnie & Clyde by Frank Wildhorn, Don Black; This World Will Remember Me; How 'bout A Dance (reprise); This World Will Remember Us choreo. by Barbara Fusar-Poli
	Short dance	
2017–2018	Cabaret; Samba: Willkommen Samba Mix; Rhumba: Mein Herr Rhumba Mix; Cha-cha: Finale Cabaret Reprise; Samba: Finale Cabaret Reprise choreo. by Stefano Caruso, Barbara Fusar-Poli, Andreas Fischer	Blackheart; Winterspell (from SkyWorld) by Two Steps from Hell choreo. by Stefano Caruso, Barbara Fusar-Poli, Andreas Fischer
2016–2017	Lover Lies; Man with the Hex by The Atomic Fireballs	Jet Set (from Catch Me If You Can); Come Fly with Me performed by Michael Bublé; Around the World
2015–2016	Polka: Charleston Heel Polka (from Gone with the Wind) by Max Steiner; Waltz: The Masquerade Ball (from Scarlett) by John Morris; Polka: French Can Can Polka (from Gone with the Wind) by Max Steiner choreo. by Paul Boll, Edina Czisy, Andreas Fischer	Grease; Greased Lightnin'; Summer Nights; You're the One That I Want choreo. by Paul Boll, Edina Czisy, Andreas Fischer

== Competitive highlights ==
- JGP – Event of the ISU Junior Grand Prix Series
- CS – Event of the ISU Challenger Series
- TBD – Assigned
- WD – Withdrew from competition

=== Ice dance with Max Liebers ===
Competition placements at senior level
Season	2022–23	2023–24	2024–25	2025–26	2026–27
European Championships		21st		17th	
German Championships	2nd	2nd	2nd	2nd	
CS Budapest Trophy	12th		8th		13th
CS Denis Ten Memorial				7th	
CS Golden Spin of Zagreb	WD		5th		
CS Lombardia Trophy		9th	7th	8th	
CS Nebelhorn Trophy	11th				8th
CS Nepela Memorial		11th			
CS Warsaw Cup		WD		11th	
Bavarian Open		4th	3rd		
Challenge Cup		5th	5th		
Egna Spring Trophy	3rd				
Iceskatera					5th
Mezzaluna Cup	4th	9th	3rd	4th	
NRW Trophy	3rd		1st	1st	1st
Pavel Roman Memorial	4th				
Skate Berlin				1st	
Swiss Open		4th			
Winter World University Games	8th				

=== Ice dance with Maximilian Pfisterer ===
International: Junior
Event	15–16	16–17	17–18	18–19
Junior Worlds			19th	17th
Youth Olympics	11th			
JGP Austria				9th
JGP Latvia			9th	
JGP Slovenia				9th
Bavarian Open		9th	3rd	3rd
Bosphorus Cup				3rd
Golden Spin			5th	
GP Bratislava				3rd
Halloween Cup				5th
Leo Scheu			4th	
NRW Trophy	15th	10th		5th
Open d'Andorra		5th	11th	
Pavel Roman	5th			2nd
Santa Claus Cup	19th	10th		
Toruń Cup			8th	
National
German Champ.	2nd J	1st J	2nd J	1st J

== Detailed results ==
ISU personal best scores in the +5/-5 GOE System
Segment	Type	Score	Event
Total	**TSS**	**171.56**	2025 CS Warsaw Cup
Short program	**TSS**	**68.52**	2024 CS Lombardia Trophy
Short program	TES	39.85	2024 CS Lombardia Trophy
Short program	PCS	28.86	2025 CS Warsaw Cup
Free skating	**TSS**	**106.55**	2025 CS Warsaw Cup
Free skating	TES	61.45	2025 CS Warsaw Cup
Free skating	PCS	45.10	2025 CS Warsaw Cup

Current personal best scores are highlighted in bold. Small medals for short and free programs awarded only at ISU Championships.

=== Senior level ===
Results in the 2025–26 season
Date	Event	SD		FD		Total	
Date	Event	P	Score	P	Score	P	Score
Sep 11–14, 2025	(Italy) 2025 CS Lombardia Trophy	7	60.82	8	88.96	8	149.78
Oct 1–4, 2025	(Kazakhstan) 2025 CS Denis Ten Memorial Challenge	7	53.59	7	97.38	7	162.77
Oct 15–19, 2025	(Italy) 2025 Mezzaluna Cup	3	69.35	5	98.44	4	167.79
Nov 13–16, 2025	(Germany) 2025 NRW Trophy	1	69.82	1	107.26	1	177.08
Nov 19–23, 2025	(Poland) 2025 CS Warsaw Cup	14	65.01	8	106.55	11	171.56
Dec 8–13, 2025	(Germany) 2026 German Championships	2	70.55	2	102.16	2	172.71
Jan 13–18, 2026	(United Kingdom) 2026 European Championships	17	63.49	16	102.82	17	166.31
Feb 17-21, 2026	(Germany) 2026 Skate Berlin International	1	69.14	1	100.32	1	169.46

Results in the 2026–27 season
Date	Event	SD		FD		Total	
Date	Event	P	Score	P	Score	P	Score
Sep 24–26, 2026	(Germany) 2026 CS Nebelhorn Trophy	6	65.85	11	83.19	8	149.04
Oct 15–18, 2026	(Hungary) 2026 CS Budapest Trophy	11	64.90	14	89.66	13	154.56
Nov 6–7, 2026	(Poland) 2026 Iceskatera	5	62.39	5	91.05	5	153.44
Nov 12–15, 2026	(Germany) 2026 NRW Trophy	1	67.58	2	99.83	1	167.41
