= Letizia Roscher =

German pair skater (born 2004)

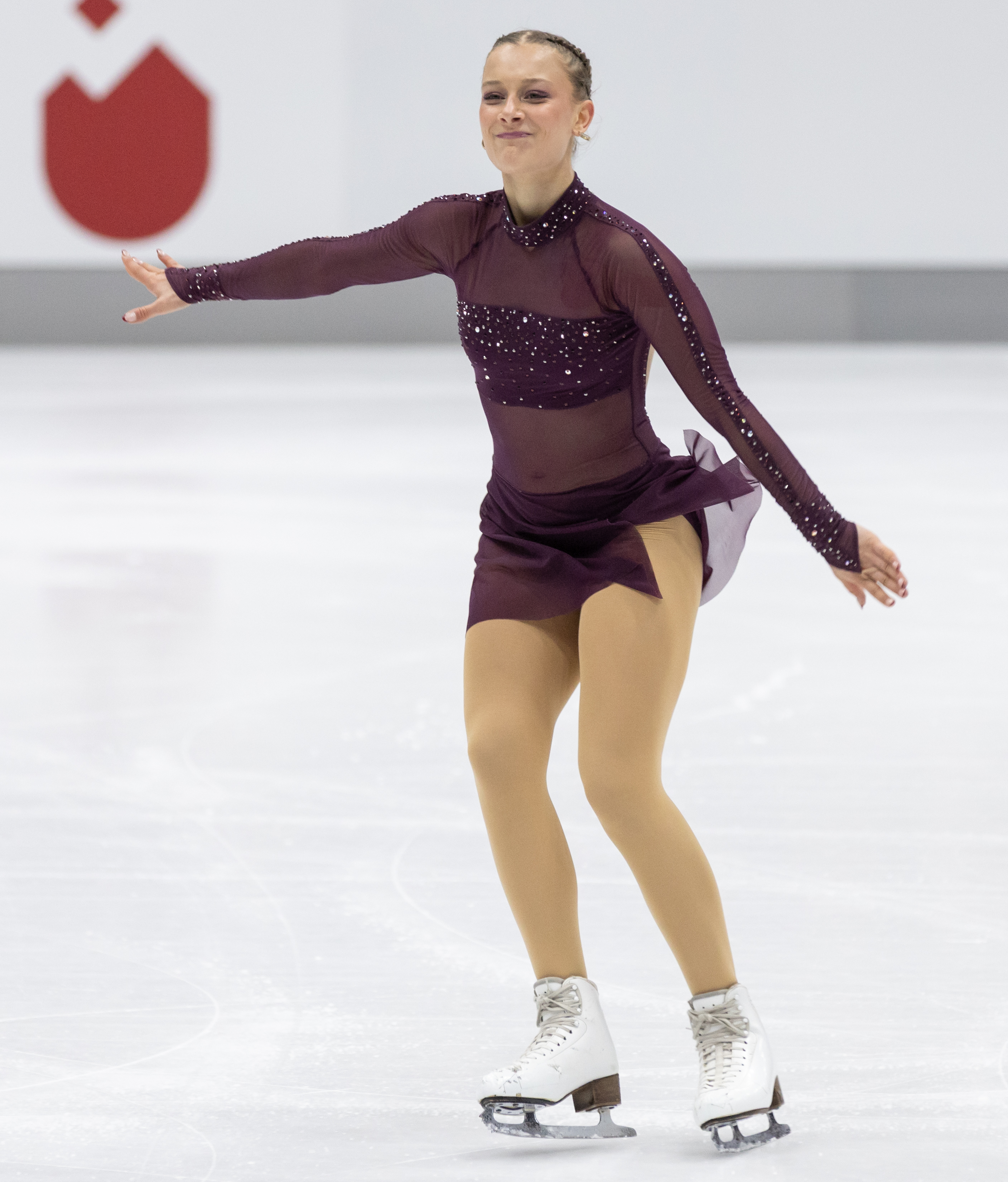
- Letizia Roscher in 2025

Personal information
- Born: 7 October 2004 (age 22) Chemnitz, Germany
- Height: 1.63 m (5 ft 4 in)

Figure skating career
- Country: Germany
- Discipline: Pair skating
- Partner: Luis Schuster
- Coach: Ingo Steuer; Pylyp Zalevskyi
- Skating club: Chemnitzer Eislauf-Club
- Began skating: 2010

Medal record
German Championships
Silver medal – second place	2023 Oberstdorf	Pairs
Silver medal – second place	2025 Oberstdorf	Pairs

Letizia Roscher (born 7 October 2004) is a German pair skater, together with Luis Schuster as her skating partner. She is the 2022 MK John Wilson Trophy bronze medalist.

On the junior level, Roscher/Schuster are three-time German junior national champions and placed fifth at the 2022 World Junior Figure Skating Championships.

== Personal life ==
Roscher was born on 7 October 2004 in Chemnitz, Germany.

== Career ==
=== Early career ===
Roscher began figure skating in 2010. She teamed up with Luis Schuster to compete in pairs prior to the 2017–18 figure skating season and coached by Monika Scheibe.

Together, they won gold on the novice level at the 2018 German Novice Championships, the 2018 Bavarian Open, and the 2018 Cup of Tyrol.

=== 2018–19 season ===
Debuting on the junior level, Roscher/Schuster won the silver medal at the 2018 Prague Ice Cup. They then won the silver medal at the 2019 German Junior Championships.

At the 2019 Bavarian Open, Roscher/Schuster placed seventh. They were ultimately selected to compete at the 2019 World Junior Championships in Zagreb, Croatia, where they finished seventeenth.

=== 2019–20 season ===
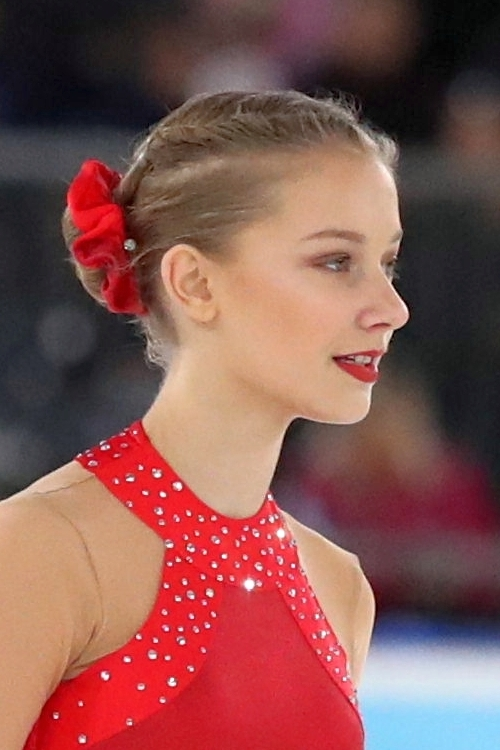
Roscher at the 2020 Winter Youth Olympics

Debuting on the Junior Grand Prix series, Roscher/Schuster finished fourteenth at the 2019 JGP Poland and thirteenth at 2019 JGP Croatia.

At the 2020 German Junior Championships, Roscher/Schuster won the gold medal.

Selected to compete at the 2020 Winter Youth Olympics in Lausanne, Switzerland, Roscher/Schuster finished eighth. They then went on to win the silver medal at the 2020 Icelab International Cup and place fifth at the 2020 Bavarian Open.

=== 2020–21 season ===
Roscher/Schuster competed at the 2021 German Junior Championships, winning their second consecutive junior national title.

=== 2021–22 season ===
Competing on the Junior Grand Prix series, Roscher/Schuster placed ninth at the 2021 JGP Austria. They then made their senior international debut by finishing fourteenth at the 2021 CS Warsaw Cup, before going on to win their third junior national title at the 2022 German Junior Championships.

Selected to compete at the 2022 European Championships in Tallinn, Estonia, Roscher/Schuster finished nineteenth. They ended their season at the 2022 World Junior Championships in Tallinn, Estonia, finishing fifth.

Following the season, Roscher/Schuster switched coaches from Monika Scheibe to Robin Szolkowy and Ingo Steuer.

=== 2022–23 season ===
Roscher/Schuster began the season at the 2022 CS Finlandia Trophy, finishing fourth. Debuting on the Grand Prix series, Roscher/Schuster finished seventh at 2022 Skate America and won the bronze medal at the 2022 MK John Wilson Trophy. They went on to compete at the 2022 CS Warsaw Cup, winning the bronze medal.

Making their debut on the senior level at the 2023 German Championships, Roscher/Schuster won the silver medal behind Annika Hocke / Robert Kunkel.

=== 2023–24 season ===
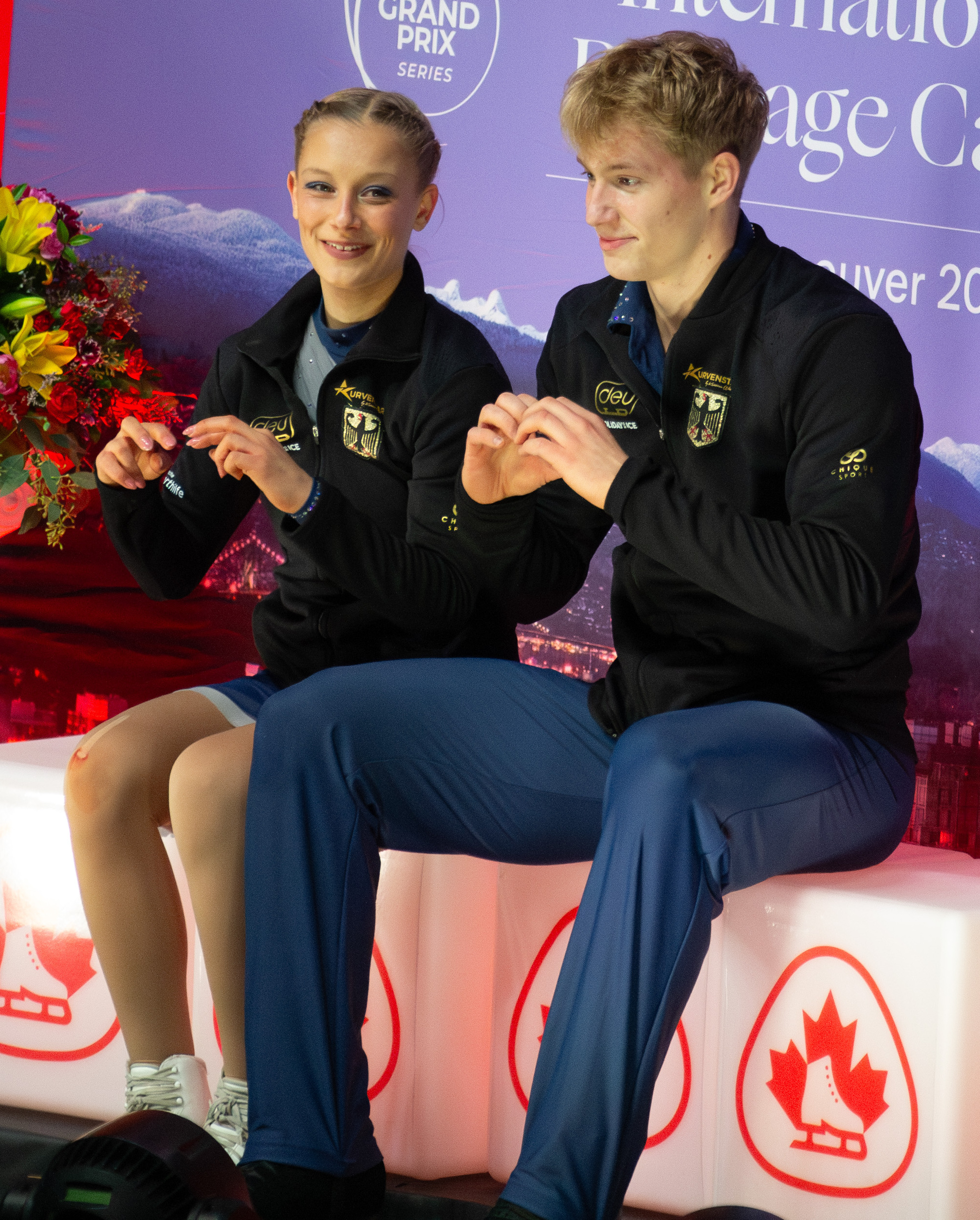
Roscher/Schuster at 2025 Skate Canada International

After dealing with injury difficulties that impacted their training, Roscher/Schuster started the season with an eleventh-place at the 2023 CS Nebelhorn Trophy. They were tenth as well at the 2023 CS Finlandia Trophy. Appearing on the Grand Prix at the 2023 Skate Canada International, Roscher/Schuster placed eighth. The pair did not compete for the remainder of the season.

=== 2024–25 season ===
Roscher/Schuster began the season by finishing eighth at the 2024 CS Nebelhorn Trophy and fourth at the 2024 Diamond Spin. Continuing to compete on the 2024–25 Challenger Series, the pair placed sixth at the 2024 CS Warsaw Cup and fourth at the 2024 CS Golden Spin of Zagreb.

At the 2025 German Championships, Roscher/Schuster won the silver medal behind Hase/Volodin.

Selected to compete at the 2025 European Championships in Tallinn, Estonia, the pair finished the event in twelfth place. They subsequently followed this up with a fourth-place finish at the 2025 International Challenge Cup.

Roscher/Schuster closed the season by placing fifth at the Road to 26 Trophy in Milan, Italy, a test event for the 2026 Winter Olympics.

=== 2025–26 season ===
Roscher/Schuster opened the season by competing on the 2025–26 Challenger Series, finishing fourteenth at the 2025 CS Nebelhorn Trophy and eighth at the 2025 CS Trialeti Trophy. They went on to place sixth at the 2025 Swiss Open, fifth at the 2025 Cup of Innsbruck, and eleventh at the 2025 CS Golden Spin of Zagreb.

In December, they won the bronze medal at the 2026 German Championships. Shortly after the event, the pair announced the end of their partnership.

== Programs ==
=== Pair skating with Luis Schuster ===
Season	Short program	Free skating	Exhibition
2025–26	Shadows; Run Boy Run by Woodkid choreo. by Stephanie Schneider, Ingo Steuer	Angels (Beethoven-AI) by Robbie Williams	
2024–25	Shadows; Run Boy Run by Woodkid choreo. by Stephanie Schneider, Ingo Steuer	Light of the Seven (from Game of Thrones) by Ramin Djawadi; Dawn of Faith by Eternal Eclipse; Khaleesi (from Game of Thrones) by Ramin Djawadi choreo. by Aljona Savchenko, Ingo Steuer	
2023–24	In the Air Tonight by Phil Collins performed by Joseph William Morgan choreo. by Joti Polizoakis	Light of the Seven (from Game of Thrones) by Ramin Djawadi; Dawn of Faith by Eternal Eclipse; Khaleesi (from Game of Thrones) by Ramin Djawadi choreo. by Aljona Savchenko, Ingo Steuer	
2022–23	In the Air Tonight by Phil Collins performed by Joseph William Morgan choreo. by Joti Polizoakis	Experience by Ludovico Einaudi; Every Ending is a Chance by Claire Wyndham, Adrianne Gonzalez choreo. by Stephanie Schneider, Susan Fichtelmann	Where Is My Mind? by Pixies performed by Maxence Cyrin
2021–22	Joke's on You (from Birds of Prey) by Charlotte Lawrence choreo. by Stephanie Schneider, Susan Fichtelmann	Experience by Ludovico Einaudi; Every Ending is a Chance by Claire Wyndham, Adrianne Gonzalez choreo. by Stephanie Schneider, Susan Fichtelmann	
2020–21	Joke's on You (from Birds of Prey) by Charlotte Lawrence choreo. by Stephanie Schneider, Susan Fichtelmann	West Side Story by Leonard Bernstein, Stephen Sondheim choreo. by Susan Fichtelmann	
2019–20	The Home of Dark Butterflies by Panu Aaltio choreo. by Stephanie Schneider	West Side Story by Leonard Bernstein, Stephen Sondheim choreo. by Susan Fichtelmann	
2018–19	The Home of Dark Butterflies by Panu Aaltio choreo. by Stephanie Schneider	Ice Age by John Powell choreo. by Stephanie Schneider	

== Competitive highlights ==
- GP – Event of the ISU Grand Prix Series
- JGP – Event of the ISU Junior Grand Prix Series
- CS – Event of the ISU Challenger Series
- TBD – Assigned
- WD – Withdrew from competition

=== Pair skating with Luis Schuster ===
Competition placements at senior level
Season	2021–22	2022–23	2023–24	2024–25	2025–26
European Championships	19th			12th	
German Championships		2nd		2nd	3rd
GP Skate America		7th			
GP Skate Canada			8th		
GP Wilson Trophy		3rd			
CS Finlandia Trophy		4th	10th		
CS Golden Spin of Zagreb				4th	11th
CS Nebelhorn Trophy			11th	8th	14th
CS Trialeti Trophy					8th
CS Warsaw Cup	14th	3rd		6th	
Challenge Cup				4th	
Cup of Innsbruck					5th
Diamond Spin				4th	
Road to 26 Trophy				5th	

Competition placements at junior level
Season	2018–19	2019–20	2020–21	2021–22
Winter Youth Olympics		7th		
World Junior Championships	17th			5th
German Championships	2nd	1st	1st	1st
JGP Austria				9th
JGP Croatia		13th		
JGP Poland		14th		
Bavarian Open	7th	5th		
IceLab Cup		2nd		
NRW Trophy				WD
Prague Ice Cup	2nd			

== Detailed results ==
=== Pair skating with Luis Schuster ===
ISU personal best scores in the +5/-5 GOE System
Segment	Type	Score	Event
Total	TSS	170.65	2022 CS Warsaw Cup
Short program	TSS	63.11	2022 CS Warsaw Cup
Short program	TES	35.12	2022 CS Warsaw Cup
Short program	PCS	27.99	2022 CS Warsaw Cup
Free skating	TSS	108.94	2024 CS Golden Spin of Zagreb
Free skating	TES	55.94	2024 CS Golden Spin of Zagreb
Free skating	PCS	55.80	2022 CS Warsaw Cup

==== Senior level ====
Results in the 2021–22 season
Date	Event	SP		FS		Total	
Date	Event	P	Score	P	Score	P	Score
Nov 17–20, 2021	(Poland) 2021 CS Warsaw Cup	15	54.78	13	95.95	14	150.73
Jan 25–27, 2022	(Estonia) 2022 European Championships	19	48.77	—N/a	—N/a	19	48.77

Results in the 2022–23 season
Date	Event	SP		FS		Total	
Date	Event	P	Score	P	Score	P	Score
Oct 4–9, 2022	(Finland) 2022 CS Finlandia Trophy	5	59.21	3	106.37	4	165.58
Oct 21–23, 2022	(United States) 2022 Skate America	3	54.87	8	81.01	7	135.88
Nov 11–13, 2022	(United Kingdom) 2022 MK John Wilson Trophy	3	60.24	3	107.13	3	167.37
Nov 17–20, 2022	(Poland) 2022 CS Warsaw Cup	3	63.11	3	107.54	3	170.65
Jan 5–7, 2023	(Germany) 2023 German Championships	2	56.44	2	109.07	2	165.51

Results in the 2023–24 season
Date	Event	SP		FS		Total	
Date	Event	P	Score	P	Score	P	Score
Sep 20–23, 2023	(Germany) 2023 CS Nebelhorn Trophy	11	46.96	11	91.44	11	138.40
Oct 4–8, 2024	(Finland) 2023 CS Finlandia Trophy	10	46.49	10	79.59	10	126.08
Oct 27–29, 2023	2023 Skate Canada International	8	52.07	8	85.47	8	137.54

Results in the 2024–25 season
Date	Event	SP		FS		Total	
Date	Event	P	Score	P	Score	P	Score
Sep 18–21, 2024	(Germany) 2024 CS Nebelhorn Trophy	8	52.34	8	98.95	8	151.29
Oct 17–20, 2024	(Poland) 2024 Diamond Spin	4	52.59	3	98.02	4	150.61
Nov 20–24, 2024	(Poland) 2024 CS Warsaw Cup	7	53.77	6	99.24	6	153.01
Dec 4-7, 2024	(Croatia) 2024 CS Golden Spin of Zagreb	6	53.75	4	108.94	4	162.69
Dec 16–21, 2024	(Germany) 2025 German Championships	2	59.56	2	106.17	2	165.73
Jan 28 – Feb 2, 2025	(Estonia) 2025 European Championships	12	55.18	13	102.97	12	158.15
Feb 13–16, 2025	(Netherlands) 2025 Challenge Cup	4	54.17	4	96.35	4	150.52
Feb 18–20, 2025	(Italy) Road to 26 Trophy	4	54.16	6	98.95	5	153.11

Results in the 2025–26 season
Date	Event	SP		FS		Total	
Date	Event	P	Score	P	Score	P	Score
Sep 25–27, 2025	(Germany) 2025 CS Nebelhorn Trophy	15	53.35	15	89.15	14	142.50
Oct 8–11, 2025	(Georgia (country)) 2025 CS Trialeti Trophy	9	52.56	8	95.24	8	148.10
Nov 13–16, 2025	(Austria) 2025 Cup of Innsbruck	5	52.17	5	88.23	5	140.40
Dec 3–6, 2025	(Croatia) 2025 CS Golden Spin of Zagreb	10	55.82	12	96.33	11	152.15
Dec 8–13, 2025	(Germany) 2026 German Championships	3	58.93	3	104.25	3	163.18

==== Junior level ====
Results in the 2018–19 season
Date	Event	SP		FS		Total	
Date	Event	P	Score	P	Score	P	Score
Nov 9–11, 2018	(Czech Republic) 2018 Prague Ice Cup	2	38.40	2	70.83	2	109.23
Dec 21–23, 2018	(Germany) 2019 German Championships (Junior)	2	44.79	2	75.42	2	120.21
Feb 5–10, 2019	(Germany) 2019 Bavarian Open	9	41.06	6	77.05	7	118.11
Mar 4–10, 2019	(Croatia) 2019 World Junior Championships	17	39.55	—N/a	—N/a	17	39.55

Results in the 2019–20 season
Date	Event	SP		FS		Total	
Date	Event	P	Score	P	Score	P	Score
Sep 18–21, 2019	2019 JGP Poland	13	38.84	14	64.58	14	103.42
Sep 25–28, 2019	2019 JGP Croatia	12	41.08	13	75.48	13	116.56
Nov 1–3, 2019	(Italy) 2019 IceLab International Cup	2	42.11	1	77.47	2	119.58
Jan 1–3, 2020	(Germany) 2020 German Championships (Junior)	1	48.88	1	87.89	1	136.77
Jan 10–15, 2020	(Switzerland) 2020 Winter Youth Olympics	8	42.80	8	80.25	7	123.05
Feb 3–9, 2020	(Germany) 2020 Bavarian Open	5	41.77	6	72.35	5	114.12

Results in the 2020–21 season
Date	Event	SP		FS		Total	
Date	Event	P	Score	P	Score	P	Score
Dec 18–19, 2020	(Germany) 2021 German Championships (Junior)	1	42.32	1	84.66	1	126.98

Results in the 2021–22 season
Date	Event	SP		FS		Total	
Date	Event	P	Score	P	Score	P	Score
Oct 6–9, 2021	2021 JGP Austria	9	43.82	10	81.05	9	124.87
Nov 4–7, 2021	(Germany) 2021 NRW Trophy	1	54.63	—N/a	—N/a	–	WD
Dec 9–11, 2021	(Germany) 2022 German Championships (Junior)	1	47.10	1	91.82	1	138.92
Apr 13–17, 2022	(Estonia) 2022 World Junior Championships	5	54.01	4	92.42	5	146.43
