= 2023 CS Finlandia Trophy =

- Type: ISU Challenger Series
- Date: October 6 – 8
- Season: 2023–24
- Location: Espoo, Finland
- Host: Suomen Taitoluisteluliitto
- Venue: Espoo Metro Areena

Champions
- Men's singles: (Japan) Kao Miura
- Women's singles: (South Korea) Kim Ye-lim
- Pairs: (United States) Ellie Kam / Danny O'Shea
- Ice dance: (Finland) Juulia Turkkila / Matthias Versluis
- Previous: 2022 CS Finlandia Trophy
- Next: 2024 CS Finlandia Trophy
- Previous CS: 2023 CS Nepela Memorial
- Next CS: 2023 CS Budapest Trophy

The 2023 CS Finlandia Trophy was held on October 6–8, 2023, in Espoo, Finland. It was part of the 2023–24 ISU Challenger Series. Medals were awarded in men's singles, women's singles, pair skating, and ice dance.

== Entries ==
The International Skating Union published the list of entries on September 8, 2023.

Country	Men	Women	Pairs	Ice dance
Canada	Gabriel Blumenthal	Fiona Bombardier	Brooke McIntosh / Benjamin Mimar	Laurence Fournier Beaudry / Nikolaj Sørensen; Lily Hensen / Nathan Lickers
Chinese Taipei		Ting Tzu-Han		
Czech Republic	Georgii Reshtenko		Barbora Kucianová / Martin Bidař	
Estonia	Arlet Levandi; Aleksandr Selevko; Mihhail Selevko	Nataly Langerbaur; Kristina Lisovskaja		
Finland	Arttu Juusola; Makar Suntsev	Janna Jyrkinen; Oona Ounasvuori; Nella Pelkonen; Emmi Peltonen	Milania Väänänen / Filippo Clerici	Yuka Orihara / Juho Pirinen; Juulia Turkkila / Matthias Versluis
France			Camille Kovalev / Pavel Kovalev; Océane Piegad / Denys Strekalin	Marie Dupayage / Thomas Nabais
Georgia		Anastasiia Gubanova		
Germany	Denis Gurdzhi; Nikita Starostin		Letizia Roscher / Luis Schuster	
Hungary			Maria Pavlova / Alexei Sviatchenko	
Italy	Nikolaj Memola	Anna Pezzetta	Irma Caldara / Riccardo Maglio; Rebecca Ghilardi / Filippo Ambrosini	
Japan	Kao Miura; Shun Sato	Rinka Watanabe		
Latvia		Angelīna Kučvaļska		
Monaco	Davide Lewton Brain			
Norway		Mia Risa Gomez		
Poland				Olexandra Borysova / Aaron Freeman
Serbia		Antonina Dubinina		
South Korea	Cha Young-hyun	Kim Ye-lim; Wi Seo-yeong		
Spain	Iker Oyarzabal Albas			Olivia Smart / Tim Dieck
Sweden	Andreas Nordebäck	Josefin Taljegård		
Switzerland	Lukas Britschgi	Alexia Paganini		
Ukraine	Kyrylo Marsak			
United States	Liam Kapeikis	Ava Ziegler	Ellie Kam / Danny O'Shea	Oona Brown / Gage Brown; Christina Carreira / Anthony Ponomarenko

== Changes to preliminary assignments ==
Date	Discipline	Withdrew	Added	Notes	Ref.
September 14	Men	(Canada) Roman Sadovsky	—		
September 14	Ice dance	(Australia) Holly Harris / Jason Chan	(Georgia (country)) Diana Davis / Gleb Smolkin	Event conflict	
September 19	Men	(Australia) Charlton Doherty	—		
September 19	Men	(Israel) Mark Gorodnitsky	—		
September 19	Women	(Netherlands) Lindsay van Zundert	—		
September 19	Ice dance	(Georgia (country)) Diana Davis / Gleb Smolkin	—		
September 25	Men	(South Korea) Lee Si-hyeong	—		
September 25	Women	(India) Tara Prasad	—		
September 25	Pairs	(Austria) Sophia Schaller / Livio Mayr	—		
September 29	Pairs	(Philippines) Isabella Gamez / Alexander Korovin	—	COVID-19 recovery	
October 2	Women	(Japan) Mai Mihara	—		
October 4	Women	(Norway) Linnea Kilsand	—		
October 4	Pairs	(United States) Chelsea Liu / Balázs Nagy	—		
October 5	Women	(Germany) Kristina Isaev	—		

== Results ==
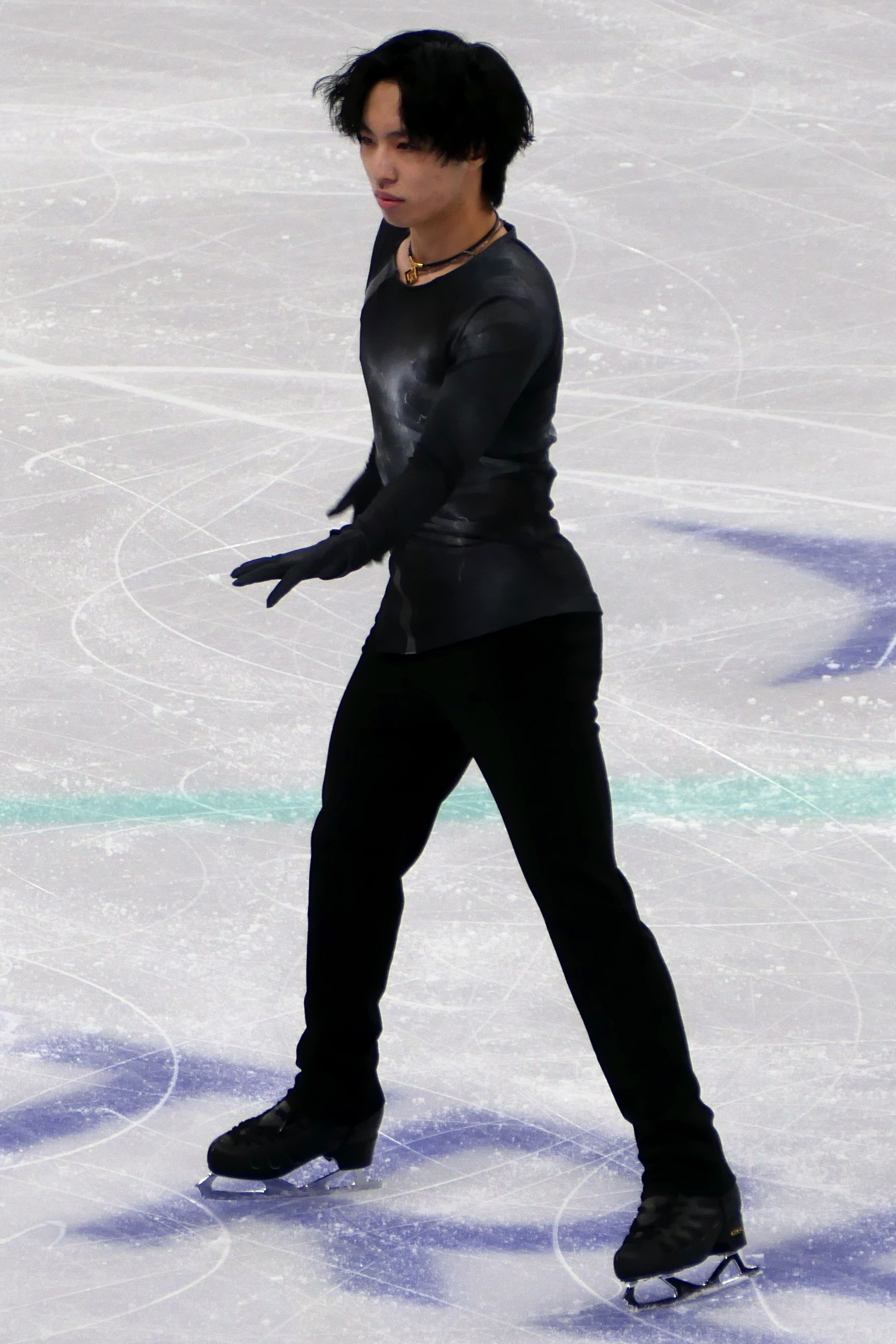
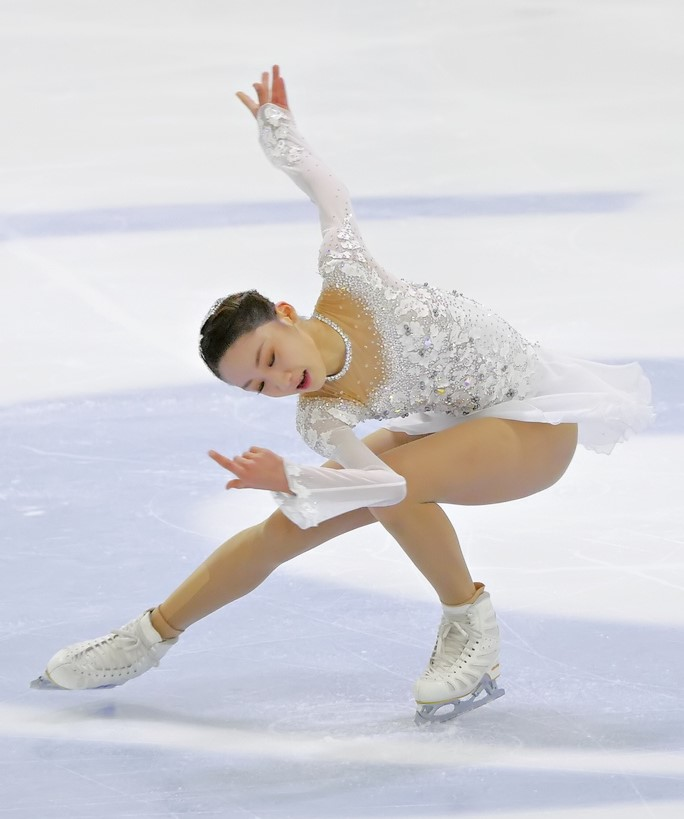
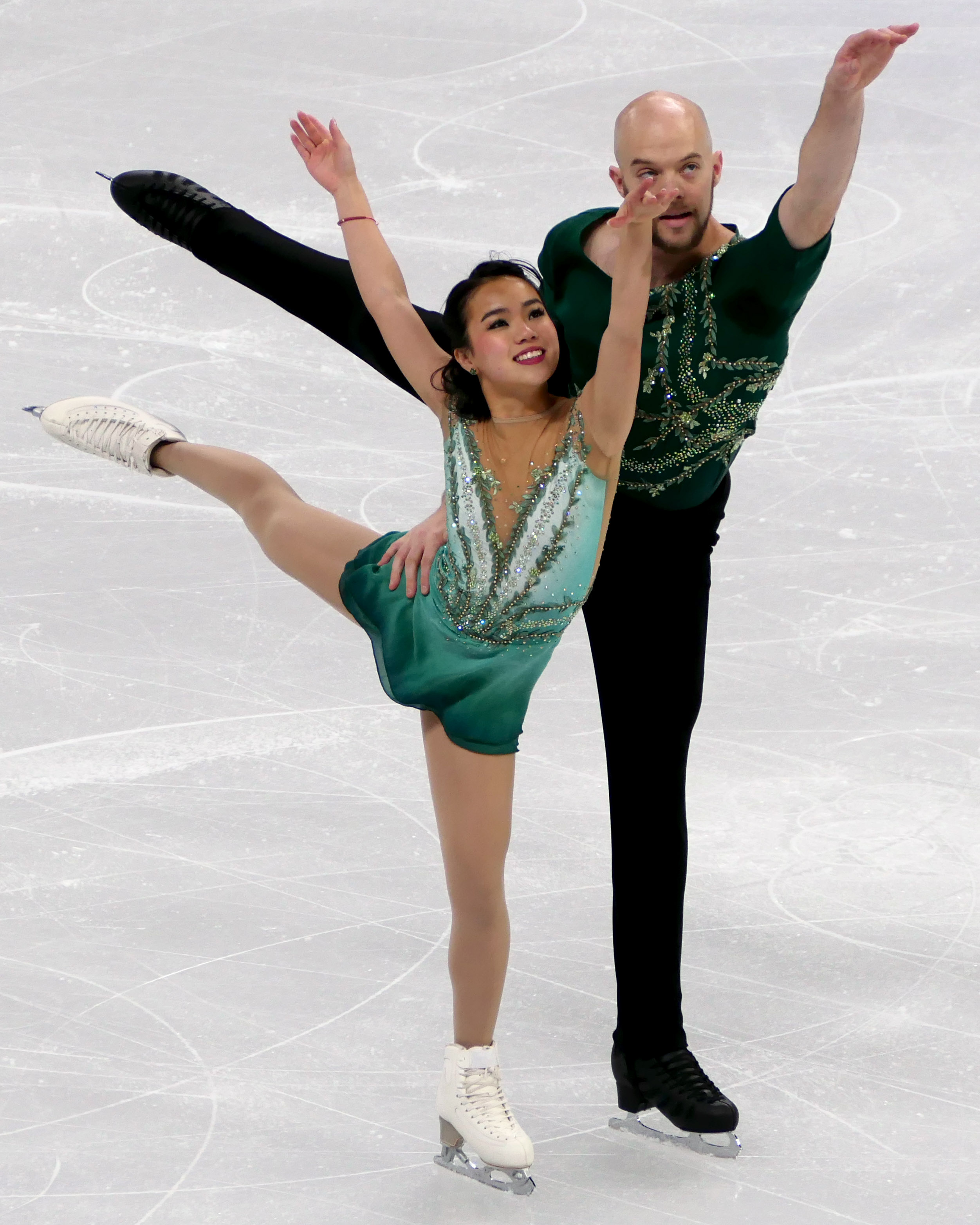
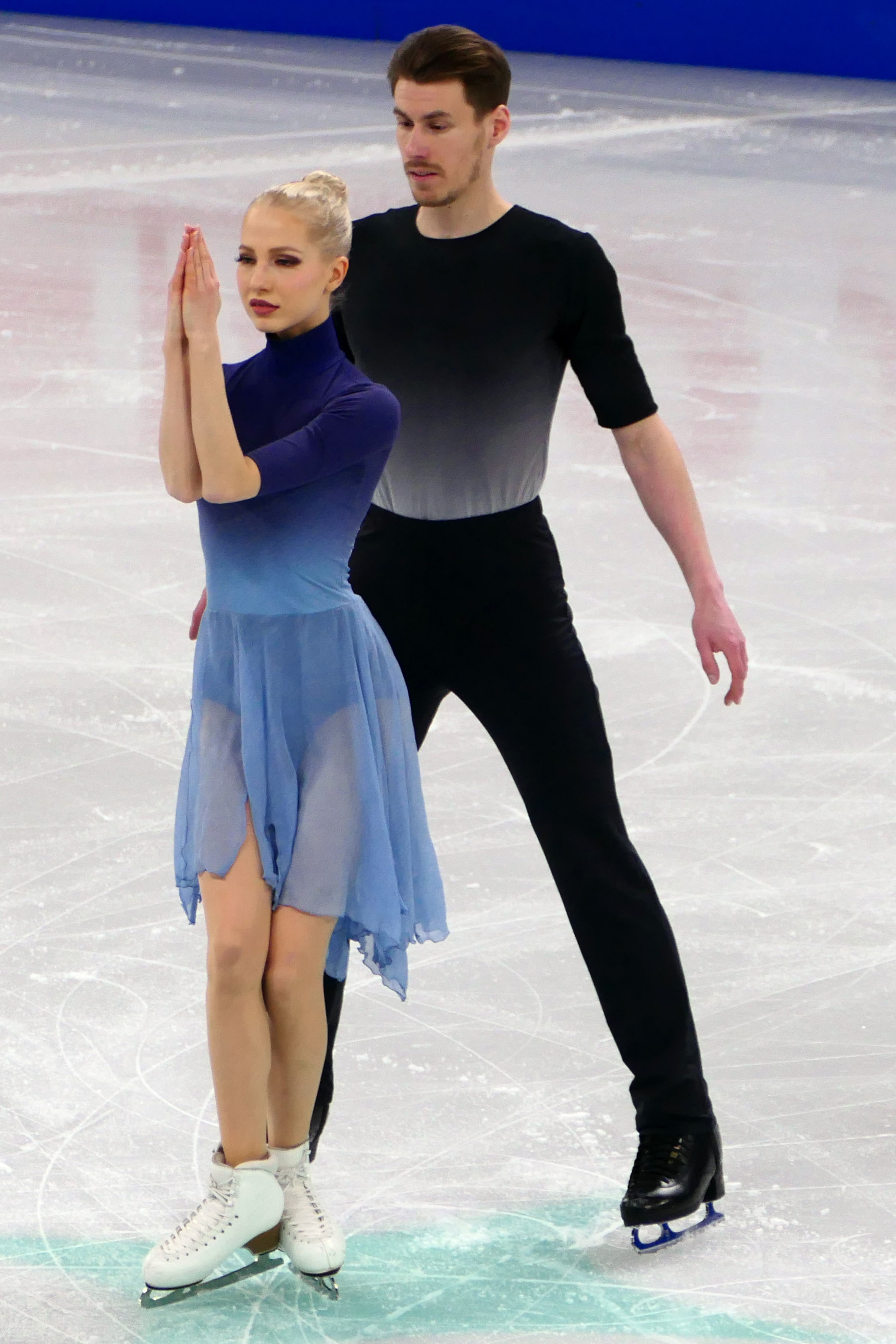
The 2023 Finlandia Trophy champions: Kao Miura of Japan (men's singles); Kim Ye-lim of South Korea (women's singles); Ellie Kam and Daniel O'Shea of the United States (pair skating); and Juulia Turkkila and Matthias Versluis of Finland (ice dance)

=== Men's singles ===
Rank	Skater	Nation	Total points	SP		FS	
1st place, gold medalist(s)	Kao Miura	Japan	267.81	1	90.95	1	176.86
2nd place, silver medalist(s)	Shun Sato	Japan	261.23	2	87.47	2	173.76
3rd place, bronze medalist(s)	Aleksandr Selevko	Estonia	238.25	4	79.51	3	158.74
4	Lukas Britschgi	Switzerland	229.37	6	74.02	4	155.35
5	Mihhail Selevko	Estonia	223.95	5	78.54	5	145.41
6	Nikolaj Memola	Italy	222.98	3	82.03	8	140.95
7	Cha Young-hyun	South Korea	211.15	9	68.77	6	142.38
8	Arlet Levandi	Estonia	210.41	8	70.22	9	140.19
9	Nikita Starostin	Germany	205.37	15	64.40	7	140.97
10	Makar Suntsev	Finland	200.55	11	67.96	10	132.59
11	Andreas Nordebäck	Sweden	190.47	13	67.42	11	123.05
12	Gabriel Blumenthal	Canada	186.49	7	72.28	12	114.21
13	Liam Kapeikis	United States	181.03	14	67.27	13	113.76
14	Davide Lewton Brain	Monaco	171.03	17	60.54	14	110.49
15	Kyrylo Marsak	Ukraine	165.75	12	67.90	16	97.85
16	Denis Gurdzhi	Germany	151.89	18	55.67	17	96.22
17	Arttu Juusola	Finland	151.69	16	62.21	18	89.48
18	Iker Oyarzabal Albas	Spain	146.15	19	43.97	15	102.18
WD	Georgii Reshtenko	Czech Republic	withdrew	10	68.49	withdrew from competition	

=== Women's singles ===
Rank	Skater	Nation	Total points	SP		FS	
1st place, gold medalist(s)	Kim Ye-lim	South Korea	187.91	1	70.20	3	117.71
2nd place, silver medalist(s)	Rinka Watanabe	Japan	180.36	3	62.73	4	117.63
3rd place, bronze medalist(s)	Anastasiia Gubanova	Georgia	179.61	4	60.62	2	118.99
4	Nella Pelkonen	Finland	179.31	7	58.78	1	120.53
5	Ava Ziegler	United States	173.60	2	65.07	6	108.53
6	Anna Pezzetta	Italy	163.32	5	60.18	8	103.14
7	Emmi Peltonen	Finland	162.02	11	53.39	5	108.63
8	Janna Jyrkinen	Finland	159.85	10	53.44	7	106.41
9	Josefin Taljegård	Sweden	155.19	8	56.88	10	98.31
10	Ting Tzu-Han	Chinese Taipei	152.25	12	52.16	9	100.09
11	Fiona Bombardier	Canada	145.70	9	53.85	14	91.85
12	Nataly Langerbaur	Estonia	145.48	13	50.69	12	94.79
13	Wi Seo-yeong	South Korea	145.43	15	47.42	11	98.01
14	Alexia Paganini	Switzerland	143.44	6	59.60	17	83.84
15	Kristina Lisovskaja	Estonia	136.87	14	47.58	15	89.29
16	Mia Risa Gomez	Norway	136.83	17	43.48	13	93.35
17	Angelīna Kučvaļska	Latvia	130.75	16	44.49	16	86.26
18	Antonina Dubinina	Serbia	111.84	18	40.09	18	71.75
WD	Oona Ounasvuori	Finland	withdrew	19	39.15	withdrew from competition	

=== Pairs ===
Rank	Team	Nation	Total points	SP		FS	
1st place, gold medalist(s)	Ellie Kam / Danny O'Shea	United States	182.07	1	63.03	1	119.04
2nd place, silver medalist(s)	Rebecca Ghilardi / Filippo Ambrosini	Italy	177.03	2	61.75	2	115.28
3rd place, bronze medalist(s)	Maria Pavlova / Alexei Sviatchenko	Hungary	169.39	3	61.66	4	107.73
4	Milania Väänänen / Filippo Clerici	Finland	164.07	6	52.80	3	111.27
5	Camille Kovalev / Pavel Kovalev	France	158.14	5	55.83	4	102.31
6	Brooke McIntosh / Benjamin Mimar	Canada	157.50	4	58.73	6	98.77
7	Océane Piegad / Denys Strekalin	France	148.87	7	51.97	7	96.90
8	Irma Caldara / Riccardo Maglio	Italy	136.79	9	48.14	8	88.65
9	Barbora Kuciánová / Martin Bidař	Czech Republic	132.90	8	48.93	9	83.97
10	Letizia Roscher / Luis Schuster	Germany	126.08	10	46.49	10	79.59

=== Ice dance ===
Rank	Team	Nation	Total points	RD		FD	
1st place, gold medalist(s)	Juulia Turkkila / Matthias Versluis	Finland	193.73	1	75.76	2	117.97
2nd place, silver medalist(s)	Christina Carreira / Anthony Ponomarenko	United States	191.14	2	74.15	3	116.99
3rd place, bronze medalist(s)	Laurence Fournier Beaudry / Nikolaj Sørensen	Canada	188.56	7	67.67	1	120.89
4	Olivia Smart / Tim Dieck	Spain	178.47	3	72.56	6	105.91
5	Marie Dupayage / Thomas Nabais	France	174.80	4	70.90	7	103.90
6	Yuka Orihara / Juho Pirinen	Finland	174.73	6	67.93	4	106.80
7	Oona Brown / Gage Brown	United States	174.47	5	67.98	5	106.49
8	Lily Hensen / Nathan Lickers	Canada	157.48	8	61.09	8	96.39
9	Olexandra Borysova / Aaron Freeman	Poland	109.29	9	40.77	9	68.52
