= Kai Jagoda =

German figure skater (born 2000)

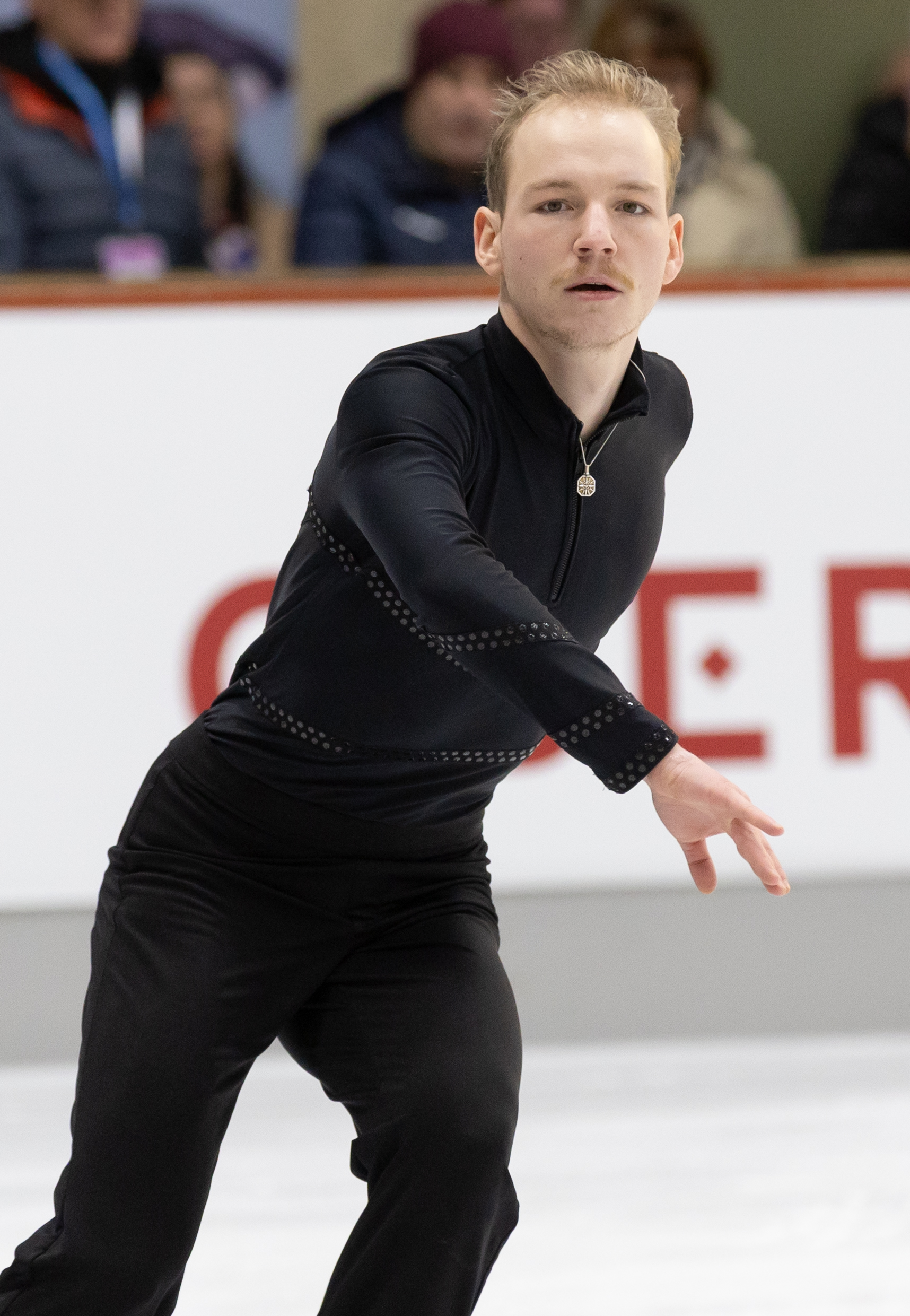
- Jagoda at the 2026 German Championships

Personal information
- Born: 9 June 2000 (age 26) Berlin, Germany
- Height: 1.68 m (5 ft 6 in)

Figure skating career
- Country: Germany
- Discipline: Men's singles
- Coach: Michael Huth
- Skating club: Skating Club of Berlin
- Began skating: 2004
- Retired: December 16, 2025

Medal record
German Championships
Gold medal – first place	2024 Berlin	Singles
Silver medal – second place	2022 Neuss	Singles
Bronze medal – third place	2023 Oberstdorf	Singles
Bronze medal – third place	2025 Oberstdorf	Singles
Bronze medal – third place	2026 Oberstdorf	Singles

Kai Jagoda (born 6 September 2000) is a retired German competitive figure skater. He is the 2024 German national gold medalist.

== Personal life ==
Jagoda studied psychology at the Humboldt University of Berlin until 2021. Since relocating to Oberstdorf, he has continued his studies via distance learning at the IU International University.

== Career ==
Jagoda began figure skating in 2004. He is a member of the Skating Club of Berlin. Since 2021 he has been training in Oberstdorf with Michael Huth and Robert Dierking.

Jagoda finished fourth at the German Championships in 2020. In 2022 and 2023, He twice won the silver medal (in 2022 and 2023) before winning the gold medal in 2024.

Jagoda also represents Germany internationally. He was nominated for the German team for the 2021 Winter Universiade, which was cancelled due to the COVID-19 pandemic. Two years later, he competed at the 2023 Winter World University Games in Lake Placid, New York, where he finished thirteenth.

He retired from competitive figure skating in December 2025.

== Programs ==
Season	Short program	Free skating
2017–2018	Mackie Messer by Kurt Weill performed by Robbie Williams choreo. by Mark Pillay	The Man with the Golden Arm by Elmer Bernstein choreo. by Mark Pillay
2018–2019	Ophelia by The Lumineers choreo. by Mark Pillay	The Man with the Golden Arm by Elmer Bernstein choreo. by Mark Pillay
2020–2021	I Love You by Woodkid choreo. by Adam Solya	Believer; Dream by Imagine Dragons choreo. by Adam Solya
2021–2022	I Love You by Woodkid choreo. by Adam Solya	Ew; Slow Dancing in the Dark (Remix); Slow Dancing in the Dark by Joji choreo. by Adam Solya
2022–2023	I'm Going to Make a Cake (from The Hours) by Philip Glass choreo. by Andrea Vaturi	Clocks by Coldplay performed by 2Cellos & Lang Lang choreo. by Andrea Vaturi
2023–2024	I'm Going to Make a Cake (from The Hours) by Philip Glass choreo. by Andrea Vaturi	And the Waltz Goes On by André Rieu & Anthony Hopkins choreo. by Rostislav Sinicyn
2025–2026	All I Want by Kodaline choreo. by Adam Solya	Piano Concerto No. 2 by Sergei Rachmaninoff choreo. by Adam Solya

== Competitive highlights ==
- GP – Event of the ISU Grand Prix Series
- JGP – Event of the ISU Junior Grand Prix Series
- CS – Event of the ISU Challenger Series
- WD – Withdrew from competition

Competition placements at senior level
Season	2019–20	2020–21	2021–22	2022–23	2023–24	2024–25	2025–26
German Championships	4th		2nd	2nd	1st	3rd	3rd
CS Budapest Trophy				10th	9th		
CS Finlandia Trophy				17th			
CS Ice Challenge			22nd				
CS Nebelhorn Trophy		11th	20th		7th		13th
CS Tallinn Trophy						18th	
CS Warsaw Cup			23rd	23rd	13th	13th	16th
Bavarian Open	8th		3rd	2nd	5th		
Challenge Cup	12th			14th			
Halloween Cup	8th						
Merano Ice Trophy					WD		
NRW Trophy			7th	2nd			
Prague Ice Cup	5th						
Santa Claus Cup	5th						
Trophée Métropole Nice							4th
Volvo Open Cup						13th	
World University Games				13th			

Competition placements at junior level
Season	2015–16	2016–17	2017–18	2018–19
German Championships	3rd	4th	2nd	
JGP Italy			23rd	
JGP Lithuania				15th
Bavarian Open		10th	9th	
Challenge Cup			3rd	
Cup of Tyrol		6th		
Golden Spin of Zagreb				5th
Grand Prix of Bratislava			1st	
Halloween Cup				2nd
Merano Cup		9th		
NRW Trophy	3rd	11th		8th
Tallinn Trophy		10th	9th	
Volvo Open Cup	7th			5th

== Detailed results ==
ISU personal best scores in the +5/-5 GOE System
Segment	Type	Score	Event
Total	TSS	204.62	2023 CS Budapest Trophy
Short program	TSS	67.47	2023 CS Budapest Trophy
Short program	TES	36.37	2020 CS Nebelhorn Trophy
Short program	PCS	34.85	2021 CS Warsaw Cup
Free skating	TSS	140.53	2023 CS Budapest Trophy
Free skating	TES	66.61	2023 CS Budapest Trophy
Free skating	PCS	73.92	2023 CS Budapest Trophy

Results in the 2024-25 season
Date	Event	SP		FS		Total	
Date	Event	P	Score	P	Score	P	Score
Oct 31 – Nov 3, 2024	(Latvia) 2024 Volvo Open Cup	10	57.47	14	83.61	13	141.08
Nov 11–17, 2024	(Estonia) 2024 CS Tallinn Trophy	17	59.95	10	110.10	18	170.05
Nov 20–24, 2024	(Poland) 2024 CS Warsaw Cup	12	60.15	13	117.05	13	177.20
Dec 16–21, 2024	(Germany) 2025 German Championships	3	59.51	3	126.97	3	186.48

Results in the 2025-26 season
Date	Event	SP		FS		Total	
Date	Event	P	Score	P	Score	P	Score
Sep 25-27, 2025	(Germany) 2025 CS Nebelhorn Trophy	11	63.50	15	115.72	13	179.22
Oct 1-5, 2025	(France) 2025 Trophée Métropole Nice Côte d'Azur	7	59.23	3	123.21	4	182.44
Nov 19–23, 2025	(Poland) 2025 CS Warsaw Cup	20	53.14	13	125.20	16	178.34
Dec 8-13, 2025	(Germany) 2026 German Championships	1	75.35	3	135.78	3	211.13
