= Maximilian Pfisterer =

German ice dancer

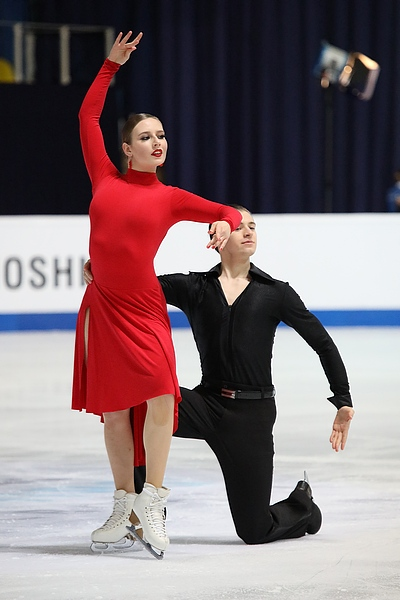
- Charise Matthaei and Pfisterer at the 2019 Junior Worlds

Personal information
- Born: 8 July 1997 (age 29) Munich, Germany
- Home town: Höhenkirchen-Siegertsbrunn
- Height: 1.82 m (5 ft 11 1/2 in)

Figure skating career
- Country: Germany
- Coach: Stefano Caruso
- Skating club: ERC München
- Began skating: 2003

Maximilian Pfisterer (born 8 July 1997) is a German ice dancer. With his former skating partner, Charise Matthaei, he is a two-time German national junior champion and competed in the final segment at two World Junior Championships (2018, 2019). They placed 11th at the 2016 Winter Youth Olympics in Hamar, Norway.

Matthaei/Pfisterer teamed up in August 2015. They were coached by René Sachtler-Lohse. Earlier in his career, Pfisterer skated with Franziska Pfisterer (his sister), Aliena Schober, Nadine Seidl, and Melina Kuffner.

Pfisterer skated with Amanda Peterson during the 2019–20 season. They trained under Stefano Caruso.

== Programs ==
=== With Luft ===
| Season | Rhythm dance | Free dance |
|---|---|---|
| 2021–2022 | Blues: Family Affair by Mary J. Blige; Low by Flo Rida & T-Pain choreo. by Maria Tumanovska-Chaika | Overture; All That Jazz performed by Catherine Zeta-Jones; Roxie performed by Renée Zellweger; Hot Honey Rag performed by Catherine Zeta-Jones (from Chicago) choreo. by Maria Tumanovska-Chaika |

=== With Peterson ===
| Season | Rhythm dance | Free dance |
|---|---|---|
| 2019–2020 | Anything Goes; Quickstep; Blues; March; Quickstep by Cole Porter choreo. by Stefano Caruso, Mathew Gates | In Bicicletta by Ennio Morricone; Cadenza Andante con Moto; Allegro (from Concerto Grosso No. 1) by New Trolls; Canone Inverso Primo by Ennio Morricone choreo. by Stefano Caruso, Mathew Gates |

=== With Matthaei ===
| Season | Rhythm dance | Free dance |
|---|---|---|
| 2018–2019 | Flamenco: Spanish Flame by Maxime Rodriguez; Argentine tango: Tango d'Amor; Flamenco: Farrucas by Pepe Romero choreo. by Barbara Fusar-Poli | Bonnie & Clyde by Frank Wildhorn, Don Black; This World Will Remember Me; How 'bout A Dance (reprise); This World Will Remember Us choreo. by Barbara Fusar-Poli |
| | Short dance | |
| 2017–2018 | Cabaret; Samba: Willkommen Samba Mix; Rhumba: Mein Herr Rhumba Mix; Cha-cha: Finale Cabaret Reprise; Samba: Finale Cabaret Reprise choreo. by Stefano Caruso, Barbara Fusar-Poli, Andreas Fischer | Blackheart; Winterspell (from SkyWorld) by Two Steps from Hell choreo. by Stefano Caruso, Barbara Fusar-Poli, Andreas Fischer |
| 2016–2017 | Lover Lies; Man with the Hex by The Atomic Fireballs | Jet Set (from Catch Me If You Can); Come Fly with Me performed by Michael Bublé; Around the World |
| 2015–2016 | Polka: Charleston Heel Polka (from Gone with the Wind) by Max Steiner; Waltz: The Masquerade Ball (from Scarlett) by John Morris; Polka: French Can Can Polka (from Gone with the Wind) by Max Steiner choreo. by Paul Boll, Edina Czisy, Andreas Fischer | Grease; Greased Lightnin'; Summer Nights; You're the One That I Want choreo. by Paul Boll, Edina Czisy, Andreas Fischer |

== Competitive highlights ==
CS: Challenger Series; JGP: Junior Grand Prix

=== With Luft ===
International
| Event | 20–21 | 21–22 | 22–23 |
|---|---|---|---|
| CS Budapest | WD | | 9th |
| CS Denis Ten Memorial | | | 4th |
| CS Cup of Austria | | 12th | |
| CS Cup of Tyrol | C | | |
| CS Finlandia | | WD | |
| CS Golden Spin | | | 11th |
| CS Nebelhorn | | 13th | WD |
| CS Warsaw Cup | C | 18th | |
| Bavarian Open | | 4th | |
| Egna Trophy | | 6th | WD |
| Open d'Andorra | | 6th | |
| Santa Claus Cup | 2nd | | |
| NRW Trophy | WD | | |
| Egna Trophy | WD | | |
National
| German Champ. | WD | 3rd | |
WD = Withdrew; C = Cancelled

=== With Peterson ===
International
| Event | 2019–20 |
|---|---|
| CS Ice Star | WD |
| CS Nebelhorn Trophy | 14th |
| Bavarian Open | 8th |
| Mentor Toruń Cup | 13th |
| Open d'Andorra | 6th |
| Pavel Roman | 3rd |
| Santa Claus Cup | 7th |
National
| German Champ. | 4th |
WD = Withdrew

=== With Matthaei ===
International: Junior
| Event | 15–16 | 16–17 | 17–18 | 18–19 |
|---|---|---|---|---|
| Junior Worlds | | | 19th | 17th |
| Youth Olympics | 11th | | | |
| JGP Austria | | | | 9th |
| JGP Latvia | | | 9th | |
| JGP Slovenia | | | | 9th |
| Bavarian Open | | 9th | 3rd | 3rd |
| Bosphorus Cup | | | | 3rd |
| Golden Spin | | | 5th | |
| GP Bratislava | | | | 3rd |
| Halloween Cup | | | | 5th |
| Leo Scheu | | | 4th | |
| NRW Trophy | 15th | 10th | | 5th |
| Open d'Andorra | | 5th | 11th | |
| Pavel Roman | 5th | | | 2nd |
| Santa Claus Cup | 19th | 10th | | |
| Toruń Cup | | | 8th | |
National
| German Champ. | 2nd J | 1st J | 2nd J | 1st J |
J = Junior level

=== With Kuffner ===
National
| Event | 2014–15 |
|---|---|
| German Championships | 7th J |
J = Junior level
