= Denis Gurdzhi =

German figure skater (born 2003)

Personal information
- Born: 25 January 2003 (age 23) Cologne, Germany
- Home town: Milan, Italy
- Height: 1.78 m (5 ft 10 in)

Figure skating career
- Country: Germany
- Discipline: Men's singles
- Began skating: 2005
- Retired: May 16, 2024

Medal record
German Championships
Gold medal – first place	2021 Dortmund	Singles
Bronze medal – third place	2024 Berlin	Singles

Denis Gurdzhi (born 25 January 2003) is a retired German figure skater. He is the 2021 German national champion and competed in the final segment at the 2020 World Junior Championships.

== Personal life ==
Gurdzhi was born on 25 January 2003 in Cologne. He has an older sister by eight years, Juliana, who represented Germany internationally in pairs. Gurdzhi's parents are from Russia. In 2019, he lost one finger during an accident in which he fell on the street.

== Programs ==
Season	Short program	Free skating
2020–2021		
2019–2020	Caruso by Lucio Dalla performed by Lara Fabian choreo. by Adam Solya	Je suis malade performed by Francisesco Di Cello choreo. by Vitali Schulz
2018–2019	No Good Place for the Lonely by Joe Bonamassa choreo. by Vitali Schulz	Je suis malade performed by Francisesco Di Cello choreo. by Vitali Schulz
2017–2018	No Good Place for the Lonely by Joe Bonamassa choreo. by Vitali Schulz	Je suis malade performed by Francisesco Di Cello choreo. by Vitali Schulz
2016–2017	Sing, Sing, Sing by Louis Prima choreo. by Vitali Schulz	Charlie Chaplin medley choreo. by Rostislav Sinicyn

== Competitive highlights ==
- JGP – Event of the ISU Junior Grand Prix Series
- CS – Event of the ISU Challenger Series

Competition placements at senior level
Season	2019–20	2020–21	2021–22	2022–23	2023–24
German Championships	5th	1st			3rd
CS Finlandia Trophy					16th
CS Golden Spin of Zagreb				13th	
CS Nepela Memorial					16th
CS Warsaw Cup				24th	
Open d'Andorra			5th		
Trophée Métropole Nice					8th
Volvo Open Cup					9th

Competition placements at junior level
Season	2016–17	2017–18	2018–19	2019–20	2020–21	2021–22
World Junior Championships				20th		
German Championships	6th	3rd	1st	1st		2nd
JGP France				8th		
JGP Germany	20th					
JGP Poland		21st				
JGP Slovakia			13th			
Alpen Trophy			4th			
Bavarian Open		6th		6th		
Challenge Cup				2nd		
Christmas Cup			2nd			
Coupe du Printemps						2nd
Halloween Cup				2nd		
Ice Star		5th				
NRW Trophy	8th		2nd	1st	1st	3rd
Prague Ice Cup				1st		
Santa Claus Cup		2nd				
Volvo Open Cup	3rd					

== Detailed results ==
ISU personal best scores in the +5/-5 GOE System
Segment	Type	Score	Event
Total	TSS	178.54	2019 JGP France
Short program	TSS	67.81	2020 World Junior Championships
Short program	TES	34.84	2020 World Junior Championships
Short program	PCS	32.97	2020 World Junior Championships
Free skating	TSS	115.75	2019 JGP France
Free skating	TES	51.95	2019 JGP France
Free skating	PCS	63.80	2019 JGP France

=== Senior level ===
2023–24 season
Date	Event	SP	FS	Total
2–5 November 2023	2023 Volvo Open Cup	10; 52.30	9; 96.76	9; 149.06
18–22 October 2023	2023 Trophée Métropole Nice Côte d'Azur	7; 57.59	9; 101.52	8; 159.11
4–8 October 2023	2023 CS Finlandia Trophy	18; 55.67	17; 96.22	16; 151.89
28–30 September 2023	2023 CS Nepela Memorial	14; 59.15	16; 100.27	16; 159.42
2022–23 season
Date	Event	SP	FS	Total
7–10 December 2022	2022 CS Golden Spin of Zagreb	11; 51.66	14; 104.58	13; 156.24
2020–21 season
Date	Event	SP	FS	Total
18–19 December 2020	2021 German Championships	1; 65.98	1; 114.83	1; 180.81
2019–20 season
Date	Event	SP	FS	Total
1–3 January 2020	2020 German Championships	6; 57.66	4; 114.09	5; 171.75

=== Junior level ===
2020–21 season
Date	Event	SP	FS	Total
26–29 November 2020	2020 NRW Autumn Trophy	1; 61.12	2; 98.59	1; 159.71
2019–20 season
Date	Event	SP	FS	Total
2–8 March 2020	2020 World Junior Championships	17; 67.81	21; 110.27	20; 178.08
20–23 February 2020	2020 Challenge Cup	3; 63.54	3; 100.44	2; 163.98
3–9 February 2020	2020 Bavarian Open	6; 66.33	5; 111.11	6; 177.44
13–15 December 2019	2020 German Junior Championships	1; 65.15	1; 107.33	1; 172.48
8–10 November 2019	2019 Prague Ice Cup	1; 62.47	1; 98.97	1; 161.44
17–20 October 2019	2019 Halloween Cup	1; 60.01	2; 104.93	2; 164.94
21–24 August 2019	2019 JGP France	8; 62.79	7; 115.75	8; 178.54
9–11 August 2019	2019 NRW Summer Trophy	1; 55.19	1; 98.43	1; 153.62
2018–19 season
Date	Event	SP	FS	Total
7–9 December 2018	2019 German Junior Championships	3; 53.30	1; 108.12	1; 161.42
29 Nov. – 2 Dec. 2018	2018 Christmas Cup	2; 52.87	2; 95.84	2; 148.71
12–18 November 2018	2018 Alpen Trophy	7; 51.90	4; 100.39	4; 152.29
22–25 August 2018	2018 JGP Slovakia	15; 49.14	13; 96.92	13; 146.06
10–12 August 2018	2018 NRW Summer Trophy	3; 51.65	2; 103.54	2; 155.19
2017–18 season
Date	Event	SP	FS	Total
26–31 January 2018	2018 Bavarian Open	7; 55.67	6; 112.01	6; 167.68
11–14 January 2018	2017 German Junior Championships	3; 55.15	3; 108.48	3; 163.63
4–10 December 2017	2017 Santa Claus Cup	2; 55.70	1; 116.69	2; 172.39
26–29 October 2017	2017 Ice Star	5; 53.27	4; 113.36	5; 166.63
4–7 October 2017	2017 JGP Poland	19; 49.78	22; 88.14	21; 137.92
2016–17 season
Date	Event	SP	FS	Total
11–15 January 2017	2017 German Junior Championships	5; 53.34	6; 95.92	6; 149.26
30 Nov. – 4 Dec. 2016	2016 NRW Trophy	10; 49.52	8; 97.64	8; 147.16
9–13 November 2016	2016 Volvo Open Cup	4; 52.61	4; 102.96	3; 155.57
5–8 October 2016	2016 JGP Germany	18; 49.09	21; 89.68	20; 138.77
