= Benjamin Steffan =

German ice dancer (born 1996)

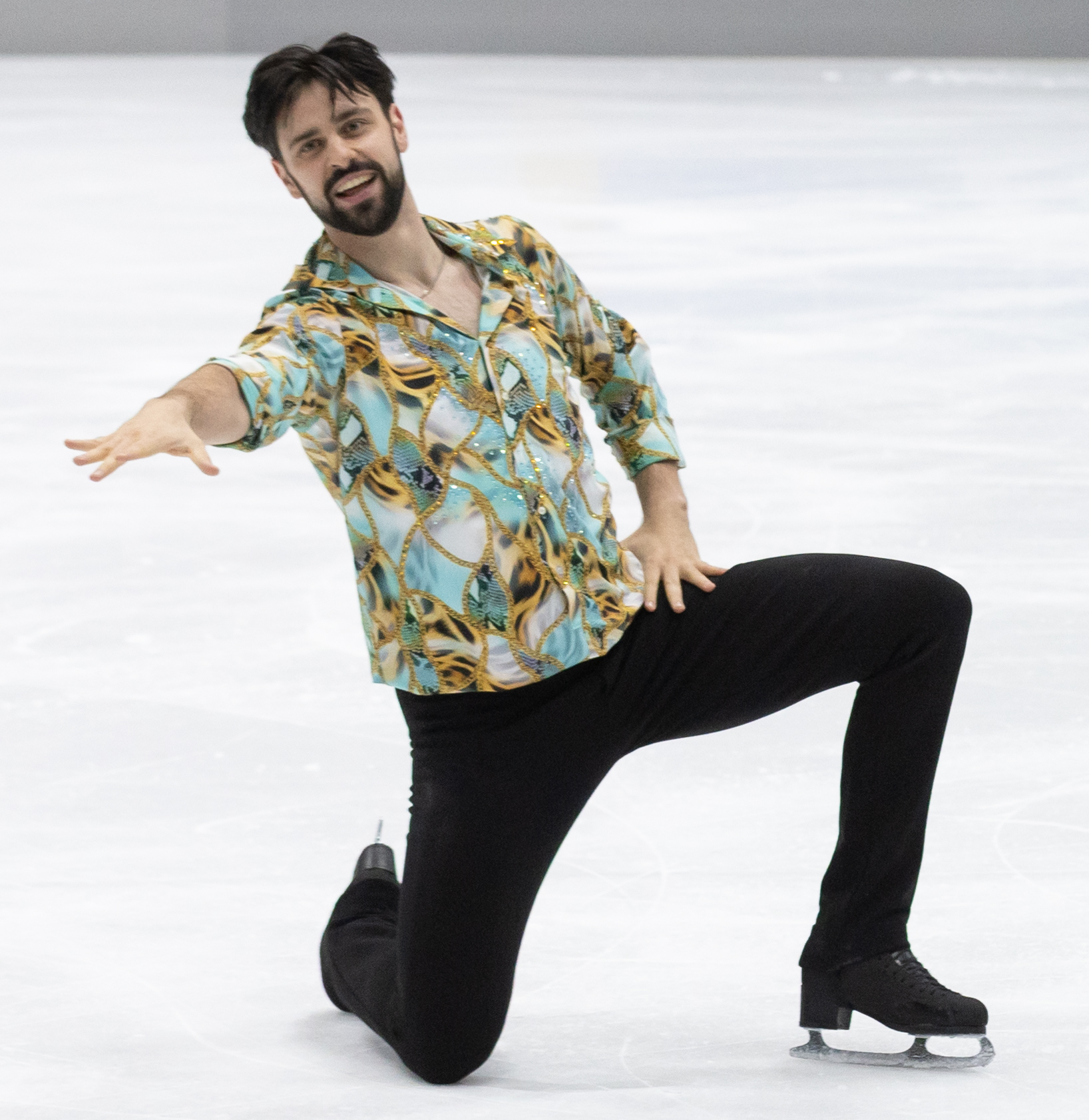
- Steffan in 2025 at the German Championships

Personal information
- Born: 12 January 1996 (age 30) Chemnitz, Germany
- Home town: Callenberg
- Height: 1.88 m (6 ft 2 in)

Figure skating career
- Country: Germany
- Discipline: Ice dance
- Partner: Jennifer Janse van Rensburg (since 2016); Sandrine Hofstetter (2015–16); Leah Steffan (2012–15)
- Coach: Rostislav Sinicyn; Natalia Karamysheva
- Skating club: Chemnitzer EC
- Began skating: 2006

Medal record
German Championships
Gold medal – first place	2022 Neuss	Ice dance
Gold medal – first place	2023 Oberstdorf	Ice dance
Gold medal – first place	2024 Berlin	Ice dance
Gold medal – first place	2025 Oberstdorf	Ice dance
Gold medal – first place	2026 Oberstdorf	Ice dance
Silver medal – second place	2020 Oberstdorf	Ice dance
Bronze medal – third place	2019 Stuttgart	Ice dance

Benjamin Steffan (born 12 January 1996) is a German ice dancer. With his skating partner, Jennifer Janse van Rensburg, he is a five-time ISU Challenger Series medalist and five time German national champions (2022–26). Janse van Rensburg/Steffan represented Germany at the 2026 Winter Olympics.

With his previous skating partners Sandrine Hofstetter and Leah Steffan, he is a three-time German junior national bronze medalist.

== Personal life ==
Steffan was born on January 12, 1996 in Chemnitz, Germany. His younger sister, Leah, is also a former competitive ice dancer.

He and his wife, Patricia, welcomed a son, Leon, in March 2025.

== Career ==
=== Early career ===
Originally a hockey player, Steffan decided to switch to ice dancing in 2006 at the age of ten. His first ice dance coach was Annerose Wetzel and he was briefly partnered with Camilla Barth for a short period. Steffan would eventually decide to team up with his sister, Leah, in 2012, and the siblings were coached by Susan Fichtelmann in Chemnitz. Together, the siblings would win bronze at the 2014 and 2015 German Junior Championships. Their partnership would dissolve, however, following the 2014–15 figure skating season, with Leah electing to retire from competing.

Steffan would eventually team up with Sandrine Hofstetter during the 2015–16 figure skating season. The team were coached by Alexander Gazsi in Duebendorf, Switzerland. Together, they would win bronze at the 2016 German Junior Championships before parting ways after the season ended.

=== Partnership with Janse van Rensburg ===
==== Early years in partnership ====
Prior to the 2016–17 figure skating season, it was announced that Steffan had teamed with fellow German ice dancer, Jennifer Janse van Rensburg and that the duo would train in Oberstdorf under coaches, Rostislav Sinicyn and Natalia Karamysheva. For the first few seasons of their career, Janse van Rensburg/Steffan competed at various ISU Challenger Series events. They won their first national medal together, a bronze, at the 2019 German Championships and won their first international medal together, a silver, at the 2019 Bavarian Open. The following year, they would win silver at the 2020 German Championships.

==== 2020–21 season ====
Janse van Rensburg/Steffan only competed at two events that season, medalling at both. They would win gold at the 2020 Santa Claus Cup and silver at the 2021 Egna Dance Trophy.

==== 2021–22 season: Grand Prix debut; First German national title ====
Janse van Rensburg/Steffan started the season by competing at the 2021 Lake Placid Ice Dance International. Going on to compete on the 2021–22 ISU Challenger Series, the duo finished seventh at the 2021 CS Lombardia Trophy, tenth at the 2021 CS Finlandia Trophy, and seventh at the 2021 CS Cup of Austria.

Assigned to an event on the 2021–22 Grand Prix circuit for the first time, Janse van Rensburg/Steffan finished tenth at the 2021 Internationaux de France.

In December, they won their first national title at the 2022 German Championships. They would then close the season by winning gold at the 2022 Bavarian Open and the 2022 Egna Dance Trophy.

==== 2022–23 season: European and World Championships debut ====
Assigned to compete at 2022 Skate America, Janse van Rensburg/Steffan started the season by finishing ninth at the event. They would then compete on the 2022–23 ISU Challenger Series, finishing winning silver at the 2022 CS Denis Ten Memorial Challenge and the 2022 CS Warsaw Cup as well as sixth at the 2022 CS Golden Spin of Zagreb.

At the 2023 German Championships in January, Janse van Rensburg/Steffan won their second national title. For the first time, they were selected to represent Germany as a team at the European and World Championships. Going on to compete at the 2023 European Championships in Espoo, Finland, Janse van Rensburg/Steffan finished in ninth place. One week following the event, they won gold at the 2023 Bavarian Open for a second consecutive time.

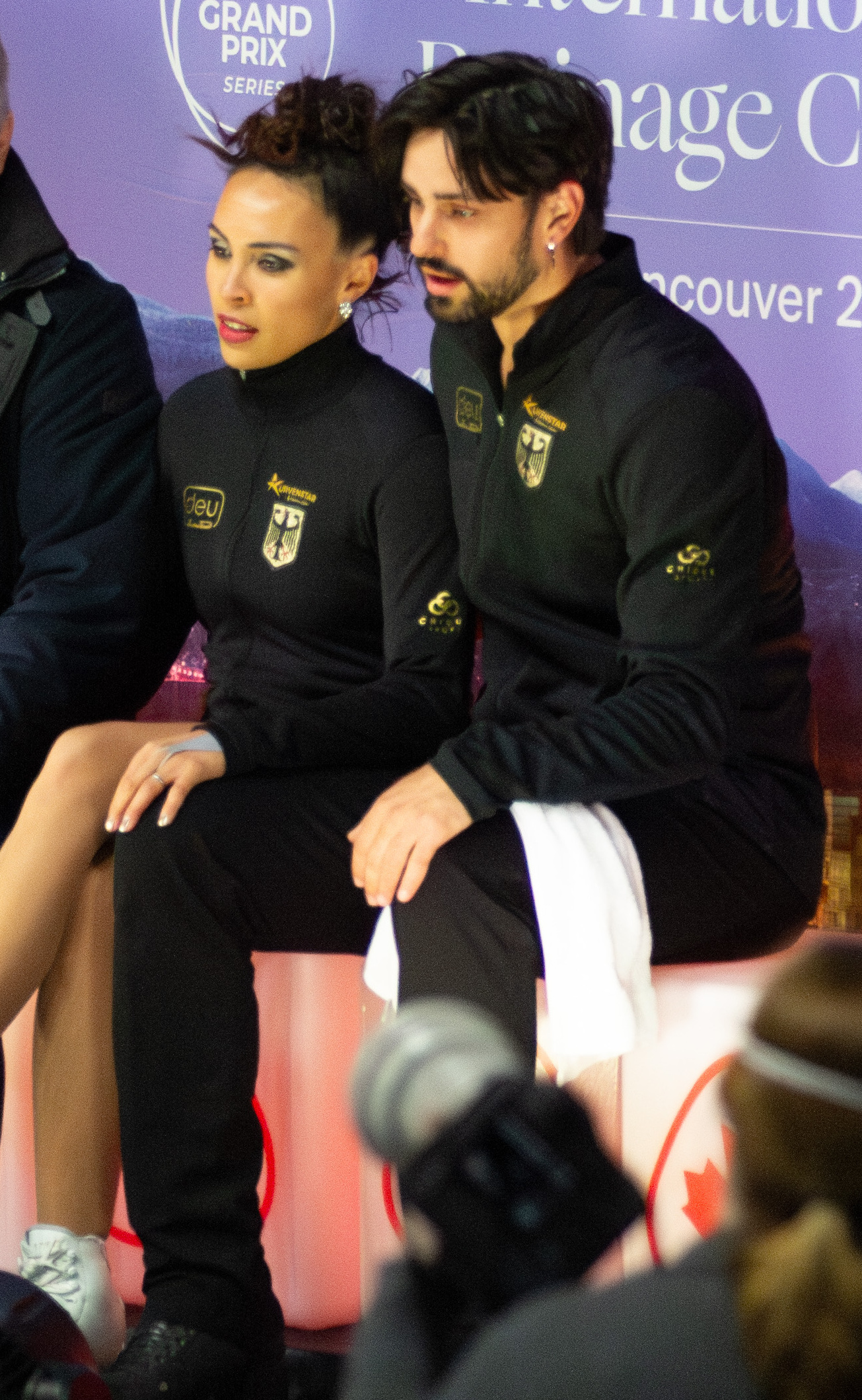
Janse van Rensburg/Steffan in the kiss and cry area at 2023 Skate Canada International

In March, Janse van Rensburg/Steffan competed at the 2023 World Championships in Saitama, Japan. They would finish the event in fifteenth place.

==== 2023–24 season ====
Janse van Rensburg/Steffan began the season by competing on the 2023–24 ISU Challenger Series, finishing fourth at the 2023 CS Nebelhorn Trophy and fourth at the 2023 CS Budapest Trophy. Assigned to two Grand Prix events for the first time, they would finish eighth at 2023 Skate Canada International and ninth at the 2023 Grand Prix of Espoo. Between these events, they would also take silver at the 2023 CS Denis Ten Memorial Challenge.

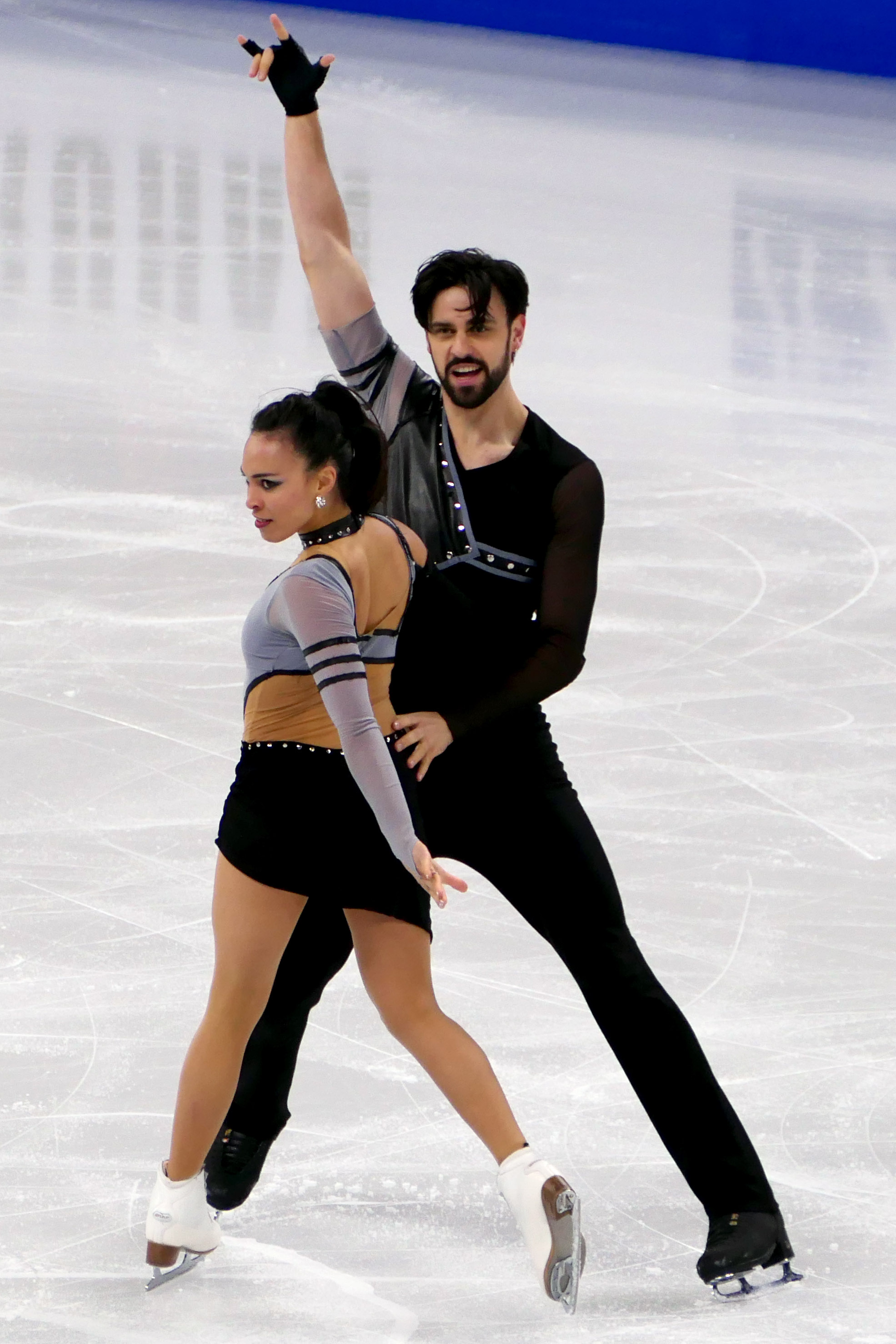
Janse van Rensburg/Steffan during the rhythm dance at the 2024 World Championships

After winning their third national title at the 2024 German Championships, Janse van Rensburg/Steffan were selected to compete at the 2024 European Championships in Kaunas, Lithuania, where they finished eleventh.

At the end of January, Rensburg/Steffan took gold at the 2024 Bavarian Open. Two months later, they competed at the 2024 World Championships in Montreal, Quebec, Canada, where they would finish in twenty-second place.

==== 2024–25 season ====
Beginning their season on the 2024–25 Grand Prix circuit, Janse van Rensburg/Steffan finished seventh at the 2024 NHK Trophy. They went on to compete on the 2024–25 Challenger Series, placing sixth at the 2024 CS Warsaw Cup and winning bronze at the 2024 CS Golden Spin of Zagreb.

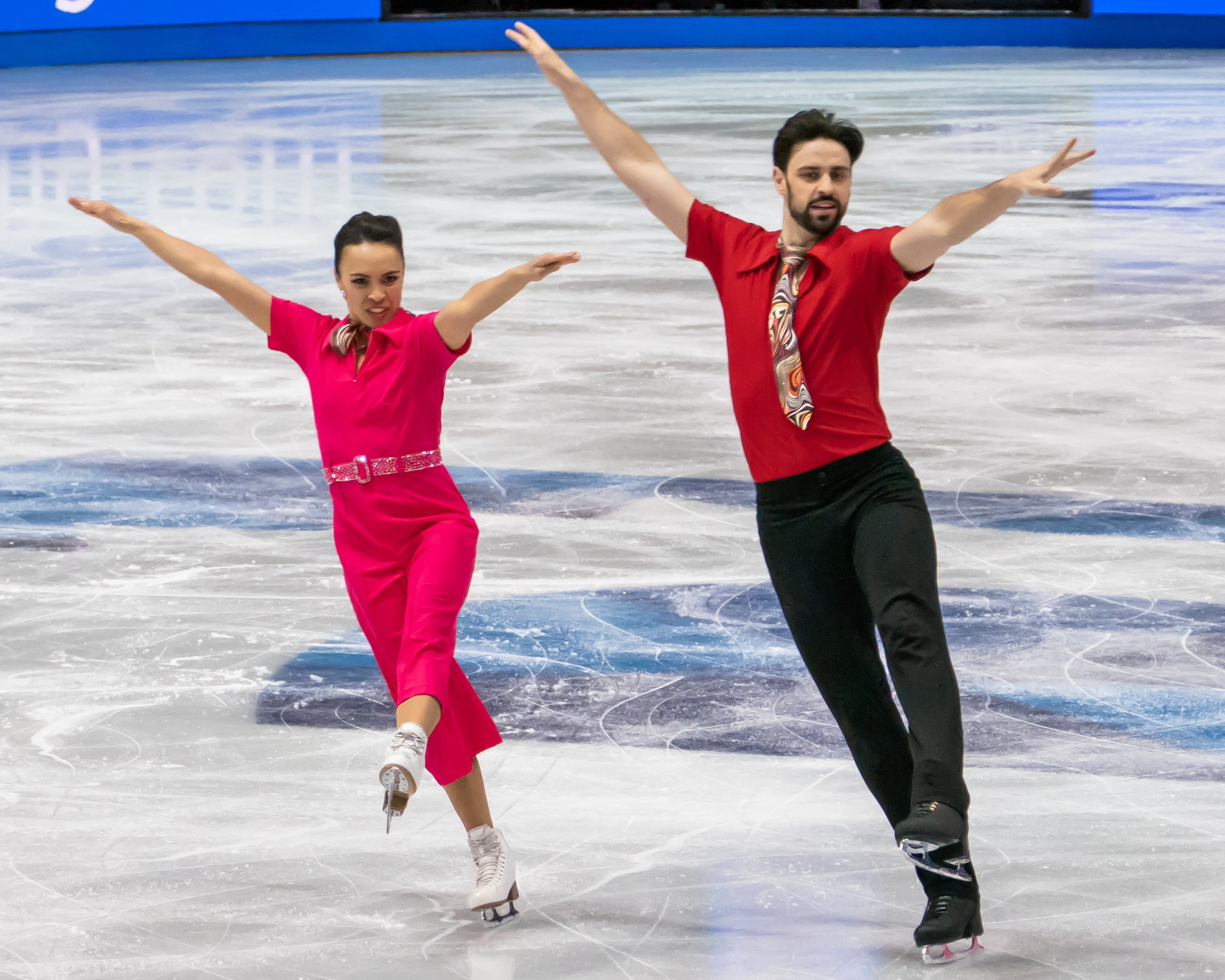
Janse van Rensburg/Steffan performing their rhythm dance at the 2025 World Championships

After winning a fourth consecutive national title at the 2025 German Championships, Janse van Rensburg/Steffan followed this up by winning gold at the 2025 Bavarian Open.

Going on to compete at the 2025 European Championships in Tallinn, Estonia, Janse van Rensburg/Steffan earned personal best scores in all competition segments and finished in eleventh place overall. They subsequently won the bronze medal at the Road to 26 Trophy in Milan, Italy, a test event for the 2026 Winter Olympics.

The pair ended the season by competing at the 2025 World Championships in Boston, Massachusetts, United States, where they finished sixteenth overall. With this placement, Janse van Rensburg/Steffan's placement won Germany a quota for ice dance at the 2026 Winter Olympics.

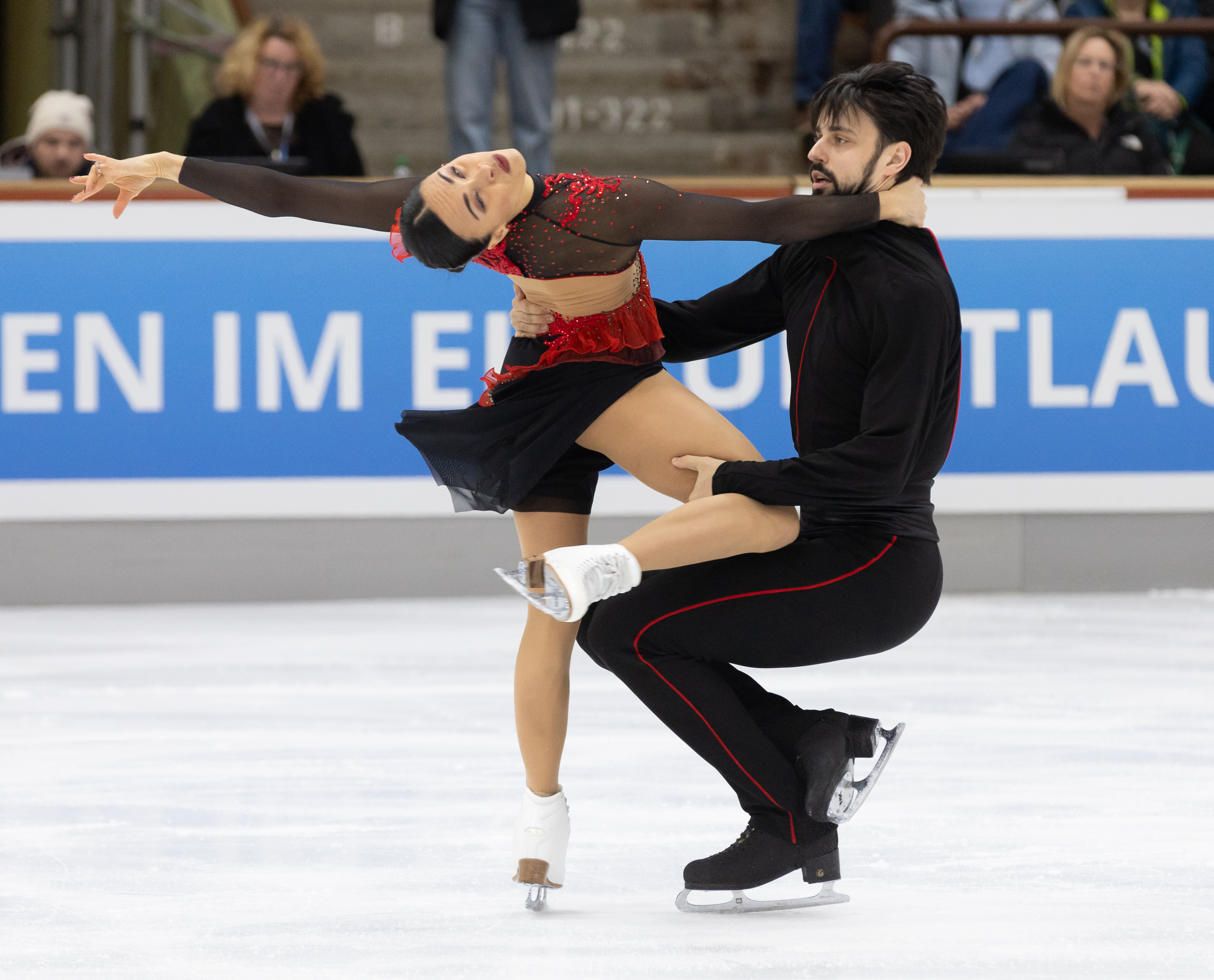
Janse van Rensburg/Steffan performing a spin during their rhythm dance at the 2026 German Championships

==== 2025–26 season: Milano Cortina Olympics ====
Janse van Renseburg/Steffan opened the season with a fourth-place finish at the 2025 CS Nebelhorn Trophy. They went on to compete on the 2025–26 Grand Prix series, finishing eighth at 2025 Skate Canada International and seventh at the 2025 NHK Trophy. The duo then continued competing on the 2025–26 Challenger Series, finishing fifth at the 2025 CS Warsaw Cup and winning silver at the 2025 CS Tallinn Trophy.

In December, they competed at the 2026 German Championships, where they won their fifth consecutive national title.

Although assigned to compete at the 2026 European Championshops, Janse van Rensburg/Steffan withdrew two days before the rhythm dance due to health reasons.

== Programs ==
=== Ice dance with Jennifer Janse van Rensburg ===
Season	Rhythm dance	Free dance	Exhibition
2025–2026	Jungle Bill; On the Run by Yello choreo. by Igor Shpilband	La Maza by Mercedes Sosa, Shakira, & Silvio Rodríguez; Ameksa (District 78 Remix) by Taalbi Brothers choreo. by Pasquale Camerlengo	Böhmischer Traum by Norbert Gälle performed by Gasterländer Blasmusikanten; Die lustigen Holzhackerbuam by Holzhacker Buam performed by Die Eichenthaler Musikanten; Ein Prosit der Gemütlichkeit by Die Original Wiesen Buben
2024–2025	Boogie Shoes by KC and the Sunshine Band; Land of a Thousand Dances by Chris Kenner performed by Wilson Pickett choreo. by Pasquale Camerlengo	Phantasia (Based on The Phantom of the Opera) by Andrew Lloyd Webber, Julian Lloyd Webber, & Sarah Chang choreo. by Pasquale Camerlengo	
2023–2024	Beds Are Burning by Midnight Oil; Don't Leave Me Now by Supertramp; Runaway by Bon Jovi choreo. by Pasquale Camerlengo	Tango by Mgzavrebi; Libertango by Astor Piazzolla, performed by Aydar Gaynullin choreo. by Pasquale Camerlengo	Moana; How Far I'll Go by Auliʻi Cravalho; You're Welcome by Dwayne Johnson
2022–2023	Samba: Safari by J Balvin, Pharrell Williams, Bia, Sky Rompiendo; Cha Cha: Havana by Camila Cabello performed by Pentatonix; Samba: I Like to Move It by Reel to Real ft. The Mad Stuntman choreo. by Mariia Tumanovska-Chaiika	Prelude (Age of Heroes) by Balázs Havasi choreo. by Mariia Tumanovska-Chaiika	Is This Love by Bob Marley and the Wailers
2021–2022	Is This Love by Bob Marley and the Wailers; Blues: Ain't No Sunshine by Matt Andersen choreo. by Maria Tumanovskaia-Chaika	The Wedding (from You Only Live Twice); James Bond Theme (from Dr. No) by John Barry; Live and Let Die (from Live and Let Die) performed by 2Cellos & Lang Lang choreo. by Maria Tumanovskaia-Chaika	
2020–2021	Foxtrot: Cabaret performed by Janice Hagan; Quickstep: Cabaret (English version) performed by Edurne; Charleston: Mein Herr performed by Ute Lemper (from Cabaret) by John Kander choreo. by Maria Tumanovskaia-Chaika	Paint It Black by The Rolling Stones performed by Ciara; Deer Stop by Goldfrapp; Sweet Dreams (Are Made of This) by Eurythmics performed by Escala choreo. by Maria Tumanovskaia-Chaika	
2019–2020	Foxtrot: Cabaret performed by Janice Hagan; Quickstep: Cabaret (English version) performed by Edurne; Charleston: Mein Herr performed by Ute Lemper (from Cabaret) by John Kander choreo. by Maria Tumanovskaia-Chaika	Paint It Black by Mick Jagger, Keith Richards choreo. by Maria Tumanovskaia-Chaika	
2018–2019	Paso Doble: Battle Dawn by Q-Factory; Tango: Angelica (from Pirates of the Caribbean) by Hans Zimmer choreo. by Maria Tumanovskaia-Chaika	Human; Deer Stop by Goldfrapp; Sweet Dreams (Are Made of This) by Eurythmics performed by Escala choreo. by Maria Tumanovskaia-Chaika	
	Short dance		
2017–2018	Rhumba: Mil Pasos performed by Soha; Samba: Travels performed by Samba Carnja choreo. by Maria Tumanovskaia-Chaika	Little Drop of Poison by Rebekka Bakken; Love Is the Drug by Bryan Ferry; These Foolish Things (Remind Me of You) by Eric Maschwitz performed by Emmy Rossum; Crazy in Love (from The Great Gatsby) by Beyoncé performed by Emeli Sandé with The Bryan Ferry Orchestra choreo. by Maria Tumanovskaia-Chaika	

=== Ice dance with Sandrine Hofstetter ===
Season	Short dance	Free dance
2015–2016	Waltz: I Feel Pretty (from West Side Story) by Leonard Bernstein performed by Hayley Westenra; Foxtrot: Sandy (from Grease) by Louis St. Louis, Screamin' Scott Simon performed by John Travolta choreo. by Alexander Gazsi	Ederlezi performed by The No Smoking Orchestra; Malahaguesca by Shantei choreo. by Alexander Gazsi

=== Ice dance with Leah Steffan ===
Season	Short dance	Free dance
2014–2015	Rhumba: Perfidia by Alberto Domínguez; Samba: Ay! Cosita Linda both performed by Nat King Cole choreo. by Sascha Rabe	This Business of Love; You Would Be My Baby; Hey! Pachuco! (from The Mask) choreo. by Sascha Rabe
2013–2014	Quickstep: Puttin' On the Ritz by Irving Berlin performed by Miss Kookie; Slow Fox: Summertime; Quickstep: Puttin' On the Ritz by Irving Berlin performed by Miss Kookie choreo. by Maurizio Margaglio	Battle Without Honor or Humanity by Tomoyasu Hotei; Bang Bang (My Baby Shot Me Down) performed by Lyn Paul; Woo-Hoo performed by The 5.6.7.8's (from Kill Bill) by RZA choreo. by Maurizio Margaglio

== Competitive highlights ==
- GP – Event of the ISU Grand Prix Series
- JGP – Event of the ISU Junior Grand Prix Series
- CS – Event of the ISU Challenger Series
- TBD – Assigned
- WD – Withdrew from competition

=== Ice dance with Jennifer Janse van Rensburg ===
Competition placements at senior level
Season	2016–17	2017–18	2018–19	2019–20	2020–21	2021–22	2022–23	2023–24	2024–25	2025–26	2026-27
Winter Olympics										23rd	
World Championships							15th	22nd	16th	17th	
European Championships							9th	11th	11th		
German Championships	4th	4th	3rd	2nd		1st	1st	1st	1st	1st	
GP Finland								9th			
GP France						10th					WD
GP NHK Trophy									7th	7th	
GP Skate America							9th				WD
GP Skate Canada								8th		8th	
CS Alpen Trophy			8th								
CS Asian Open Trophy				4th							
CS Budapest Trophy								4th			
CS Denis Ten Memorial							2nd	2nd			
CS Finlandia Trophy		13th				10th					
CS Golden Spin of Zagreb	10th			5th			6th		3rd		
CS Ice Challenge		4th				7th					
CS Ice Star	9th	10th									
CS Lombardia Trophy						7th					
CS Nebelhorn Trophy			6th	8th				7th		4th	
CS Tallinn Trophy		6th	6th							2nd	
CS Warsaw Cup							2nd		6th	5th	
Bavarian Open	10th	4th	2nd			1st	1st	1st			
Egna Dance Trophy				6th	2nd	1st					
Halloween Cup			5th								
Lake Placid Ice Dance						8th					
Open d'Andorra				5th							
Open Ice Mall Cup			6th								
Road to 26 Trophy									3rd		
Santa Claus Cup		7th			1st						
Winter Universiade	9th										

=== Ice dance with Sandrine Hofstetter ===
International: Junior
Event	2015–16
JGP Croatia	15th
JGP Poland	11th
Santa Claus Cup	10th
Tallinn Trophy	WD
National
German Junior	3rd

=== Ice dance with Leah Steffan ===
International: Junior
Event	12–13	13–14	14–15
JGP Belarus		11th	
JGP Germany			12th
JGP Slovakia		13th	
Bavarian Open	19th		
Grand Prize SNP	4th		
Leo Scheu			11th
NRW Trophy	23rd	5th	12th
Pavel Roman			4th
Santa Claus Cup		5th	
National
German Champ.			3rd J
German Junior	7th	3rd	

== Detailed results ==
=== Ice dance with Jennifer Janse van Rensburg ===
ISU personal best scores in the +5/-5 GOE System
Segment	Type	Score	Event
Total	TSS	192.31	2025 CS Tallinn Trophy
Rhythm dance	TSS	75.45	2025 European Championships
Rhythm dance	TES	43.42	2025 European Championships
Rhythm dance	PCS	32.52	2025 CS Tallinn Trophy
Free dance	TSS	116.86	2025 CS Tallinn Trophy
Free dance	TES	65.96	2025 CS Tallinn Trophy
Free dance	PCS	50.90	2025 CS Tallinn Trophy

Results in the 2020-21 season
Date	Event	RD		FD		Total	
Date	Event	P	Score	P	Score	P	Score
Nov 26-29, 2020	(Hungary) 2020 Santa Claus Cup	1	70.12	1	102.01	1	172.13
Feb 6-7, 2020	(Italy) 2021 Egna Dance Trophy	2	69.93	2	98.50	2	168.43

Results in the 2021-22 season
Date	Event	RD		FD		Total	
Date	Event	P	Score	P	Score	P	Score
Aug 12-15, 2021	(United States) 2021 Lake Placid Ice Dance International	8	59.99	7	94.41	8	154.40
Sep 10–12, 2021	(Italy) 2021 CS Lombardia Trophy	8	65.97	7	99.38	7	165.35
Oct 7-10, 2021	(Finland) 2021 CS Finlandia Trophy	10	65.64	11	99.58	10	165.22
Nov 11-14, 2021	2021 CS Cup of Austria	8	65.91	6	102.59	7	168.50
Nov 19-21, 2021	2021 Internationaux de France	10	57.14	9	96.95	10	154.09
Dec 9-11, 2021	(Germany) 2022 German Championships	1	70.49	1	108.58	1	179.07
Jan18-23, 2022	(Germany) 2022 Bavarian Open	1	73.61	1	112.49	1	186.10
Feb 4-6, 2022	(Italy) 2022 Egna Dance Trophy	1	76.31	1	106.48	1	182.79

Results in the 2022-23 season
Date	Event	RD		FD		Total	
Date	Event	P	Score	P	Score	P	Score
Oct 21–23, 2022	(United States) 2022 Skate America	8	65.42	9	94.84	9	160.26
Oct 26-29, 2022	(Kazakhstan) 2022 CS Denis Ten Memorial Challenge	2	72.15	2	105.76	2	177.91
Nov 17-20, 2022	(Poland) 2022 CS Warsaw Cup	1	72.58	2	108.92	2	181.50
Dec 7-10, 2022	(Croatia) 2022 CS Golden Spin of Zagreb	4	69.92	6	103.00	6	172.92
Jan 5-7, 2023	(Germany) 2023 German Championships	1	74.85	1	113.68	1	188.54
Jan 25–29, 2023	(Finland) 2023 European Championships	9	67.90	10	101.27	9	169.17
Jan 31 - Feb 5, 2024	(Germany) 2023 Bavarian Open	1	73.97	1	108.60	1	182.57
Mar 22–26, 2023	(Japan) 2023 World Championships	15	67.95	16	102.08	15	170.03

Results in the 2023-24 season
Date	Event	RD		FD		Total	
Date	Event	P	Score	P	Score	P	Score
Sep 20-23, 2023	(Germany) 2023 CS Nebelhorn Trophy	9	62.27	7	107.03	7	169.30
Oct 13-15, 2023	(Hungary) 2023 CS Budapest Trophy	4	68.95	4	107.47	4	176.42
Oct 27–29, 2023	2023 Skate Canada International	8	66.14	7	106.38	8	172.52
Nov 2-5, 2023	(Kazakhstan) 2023 CS Denis Ten Memorial Challenge	2	69.81	2	109.61	2	179.42
Nov 17–19, 2023	(Finland) 2023 Grand Prix of Espoo	9	65.53	9	99.02	9	164.55
Dec 14-16, 2024	(Germany) 2024 German Championships	1	70.67	1	114.82	1	185.49
Jan 10–14, 2024	(Lithuania) 2024 European Championships	11	68.37	10	110.41	11	178.78
Jan 30 - Feb 4, 2024	(Germany) 2024 Bavarian Open	1	73.45	1	111.82	1	185.27
Mar 18–24, 2024	(Canada) 2024 World Championships	22	65.86	—N/a	—N/a	22	65.86

Results in the 2024-25 season
Date	Event	RD		FD		Total	
Date	Event	P	Score	P	Score	P	Score
Nov 8–11, 2024	(Japan) 2024 NHK Trophy	6	68.82	7	104.54	7	173.36
Nov 20-24, 2024	(Poland) 2024 CS Warsaw Cup	3	74.88	11	96.79	6	171.67
Dec 4-7, 2024	(Croatia) 2024 CS Golden Spin of Zagreb	2	71.86	3	105.78	3	177.64
Dec 16-21, 2024	(Germany) 2025 German Championships	1	76.06	1	115.62	1	191.68
Jan 20-26, 2025	(Germany) 2025 Bavarian Open	1	76.38	1	111.26	1	187.64
Jan 28 – Feb 2, 2025	(Estonia) 2025 European Championships	9	75.45	11	111.42	11	186.87
Feb 19–20, 2025	(Italy) 2025 Road to 26 Trophy	3	73.54	3	109.42	3	182.96
Mar 25–30, 2025	(United States) 2025 World Championships	12	73.35	17	105.98	16	179.33

Results in the 2025–26 season
Date	Event	RD		FD		Total	
Date	Event	P	Score	P	Score	P	Score
Sep 25–27, 2025	(Germany) 2025 CS Nebelhorn Trophy	3	68.98	4	108.32	4	180.05
Oct 31 – Nov 2, 2025	2025 Skate Canada International	8	69.91	7	108.37	8	178.28
Nov 7–9, 2025	(Japan) 2025 NHK Trophy	7	69.73	7	107.81	7	177.54
Nov 19–23, 2025	(Poland) 2025 CS Warsaw Cup	5	71.71	4	111.26	5	182.97
Nov 25-30, 2025	(Estonia) 2025 CS Tallinn Trophy	2	75.45	2	116.86	2	192.31
Dec 8-13, 2025	(Germany) 2026 German Championships	1	77.06	1	119.51	1	196.57
Feb 17–19, 2026	(Italy) 2026 Winter Olympics	23	63.67	—N/a	—N/a	23	63.67
Mar 24–29, 2026	(Czech Republic) 2026 World Championships	17	71.02	17	106.51	17	177.53
