= 2025 NHK Trophy =

International figure skating competition

- Type: Grand Prix
- Date: November 7 – 9
- Season: 2025–26
- Location: Osaka, Japan
- Host: Japan Skating Federation
- Venue: Towa Pharmaceutical Ractab Dome

Champions
- Men's singles: (Japan) Yuma Kagiyama
- Women's singles: (Japan) Kaori Sakamoto
- Pairs: (Italy) Sara Conti and Niccolò Macii
- Ice dance: (United Kingdom) Lilah Fear and Lewis Gibson
- Previous: 2024 NHK Trophy
- Next: 2026 NHK Trophy
- Previous Grand Prix: 2025 Skate Canada International
- Next Grand Prix: 2025 Skate America

The 2025 NHK Trophy took place at the Towa Pharmaceutical Ractab Dome in Osaka, Japan.

The 2025 NHK Trophy was a figure skating competition sanctioned by the International Skating Union (ISU). Organized and hosted by the Japan Skating Federation (Japanese: 日本スケート連盟), it was the fourth event of the 2025–26 Grand Prix of Figure Skating: a senior-level international invitational competition series. It was held from November 7 to 9 at the Towa Pharmaceutical Ractab Dome in Osaka, Japan. Yuma Kagiyama and Kaori Sakamoto, both of Japan, won the men's and women's events, respectively. Sara Conti and Niccolò Macii of Italy won the pairs event, and Lilah Fear and Lewis Gibson of Great Britain won the ice dance event. Skaters earned points based on their results, and the top skaters or teams in each discipline at the end of the season were then invited to compete at the 2025 Grand Prix Final in Nagoya, Japan. The 2025 NHK Trophy marked the first competition for Maia and Alex Shibutani of the United States since they retired after the 2018 Winter Olympics, and was approximately one month after Alex Shibutani drew criticism when video of him verbally berating Maia at practice was released online.

== Background ==
The ISU Grand Prix of Figure Skating is a series of seven events sanctioned by the International Skating Union (ISU) and held during the autumn: six qualifying events and the Grand Prix of Figure Skating Final. This allows skaters to perfect their programs earlier in the season, as well as compete against the skaters whom they would later encounter at the World Championships. Skaters earn points based on their results in their respective competitions and the top skaters or teams in each discipline are invited to compete at the Grand Prix Final. The NHK Trophy debuted in 1979, and when the ISU launched the Grand Prix series in 1995, the NHK Trophy was one of the five qualifying events. It has been a Grand Prix event every year since.

The 2025 NHK Trophy was the fourth event of the 2025–26 Grand Prix of Figure Skating series, and was held from November 7 to 9 at the Towa Pharmaceutical Ractab Dome in Osaka, Japan.

== Changes to preliminary assignments ==
The International Skating Union published the initial list of entrants on June 6, 2025.

Discipline	Withdrew		Added		Notes	Ref.
Discipline	Date	Skater(s)	Date	Skater(s)	Notes	Ref.
Ice dance	July 11	(Japan); Azusa Tanaka; Shingo Nishiyama	July 29	(Germany); Jennifer Janse van Rensburg; Benjamin Steffan	Retirement (Tanaka)	
Men	—N/a		September 14	(Japan); Haru Kakiuchi	Host picks	
Women	—N/a		September 15	(Japan); Yuna Aoki	Host picks	
Pairs	—N/a		September 15	(Japan); Yuna Nagaoka; Sumitada Moriguchi	Host picks	
Women	October 14	(Switzerland); Kimmy Repond	October 15	(Switzerland); Livia Kaiser	Injury (Repond)	
Women	October 16	(Belgium); Nina Pinzarrone	October 21	(South Korea); Yun Ah-sun	Injury (Pinzarrone)	

== Required performance elements ==
=== Single skating ===
Men and women competing in single skating performed their short programs on November 7. Lasting 2 minutes 40 seconds (+/− 10 seconds), the short program had to include the following elements:

For men: one double or triple Axel; one triple or quadruple jump; one jump combination consisting of a double jump and a triple jump, two triple jumps, or a quadruple jump and a double jump or triple jump; one flying spin; one camel spin or sit spin with a change of foot; one spin combination with a change of foot; and a step sequence using the full ice surface.

For women: one double or triple Axel; one triple jump; one jump combination consisting of a double jump and a triple jump, or two triple jumps; one flying spin; one layback spin, sideways leaning spin, camel spin, or sit spin without a change of foot; one spin combination with a change of foot; and one step sequence using the full ice surface.

Men and women performed their free skates on November 8. Lasting 4 minutes (+/− 10 seconds), the free skate had to include the following: seven jump elements, of which one had to be an Axel-type jump; three spins, of which one had to be a spin combination, one a flying spin, and one a spin with only one position; a step sequence; and a choreographic sequence.

=== Pairs ===
Couples competing in pair skating performed their short programs on November 7. Lasting 2 minutes 40 seconds (+/− 10 seconds), the short program had to include the following elements: one pair lift, one double or triple twist lift, one double or triple throw jump, one double or triple solo jump, one solo spin combination with a change of foot, one death spiral, and a step sequence using the full ice surface.

Couples performed their free skates on November 8. Lasting 4 minutes (+/− 10 seconds), the free skate had to include the following: three pair lifts, of which one had to be a twist lift; two different throw jumps; one solo jump; one jump combination or sequence; one pair spin combination; one death spiral; and a choreographic sequence.

=== Ice dance ===
Couples competing in ice dance performed their rhythm dances on November 7. Lasting 2 minutes 50 seconds (+/− 10 seconds), the theme of the rhythm dance this season was "music, dance styles, and feeling of the 1990s". Examples of applicable dance styles and music included pop, Latin, house, techno, hip-hop, and grunge. The rhythm dance had to include the following elements: one pattern dance step sequence, one choreographic rhythm sequence, one dance lift, one set of sequential twizzles, and one step sequence.

Couples then performed their free dances on November 8. Lasting 4 minutes (+/− 10 seconds), the free dance had to include the following: three dance lifts or one short lift and one combination lift; one dance spin; one set of synchronized twizzles; one step sequence in hold; one step sequence while on one skate and not in hold, and three choreographic elements.

== Judging ==
Skaters were judged according to the required technical elements of their program (such as jumps and spins), as well as the overall presentation of their program, based on three program components (skating skills, presentation, and composition). Each technical element in a figure skating performance was assigned a predetermined base point value and scored by a panel of nine judges on a scale from –5 to +5 based on the quality of its execution. Each Grade of Execution (GOE) from –5 to +5 was assigned a value as indicated on the Scale of Values. For example, a triple Axel was worth a base value of 8.00 points, and a GOE of +3 was worth 2.40 points, so a triple Axel with a GOE of +3 earned 10.40 points. The judging panel's GOE for each element was determined by calculating the trimmed mean (the average after discarding the highest and lowest scores). The panel's scores for all elements were added together to generate a Total Elements Score. At the same time, the judges evaluated each performance based on the five aforementioned program components and assigned each a score from 0.25 to 10 in 0.25-point increments. The judging panel's final score for each program component was also determined by calculating the trimmed mean. Those scores were then multiplied by the factor shown on the chart below; the results were added together to generate a total Program Component Score.

Program component factoring
Discipline	Short program or Rhythm dance	Free skate or Free dance
Men	1.67	3.33
Women	1.33	2.67
Pairs	1.33	2.67
Ice dance	1.33	2.00

Deductions were applied for certain violations, such as time infractions, stops and restarts, or falls. The Total Elements Score and Program Component Score were then added together, minus any deductions, to generate a final performance score for each skater or team.

== Medal summary ==
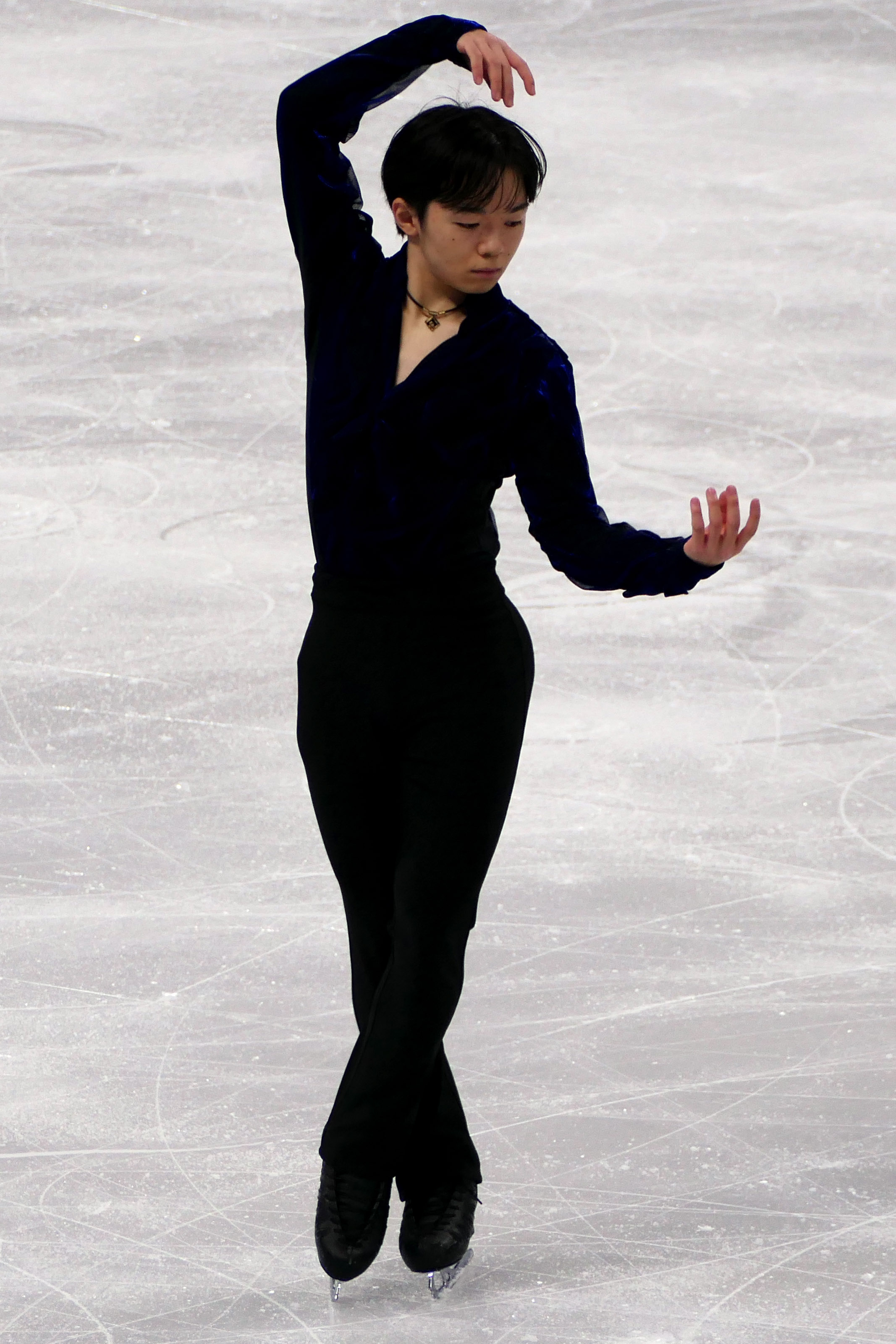
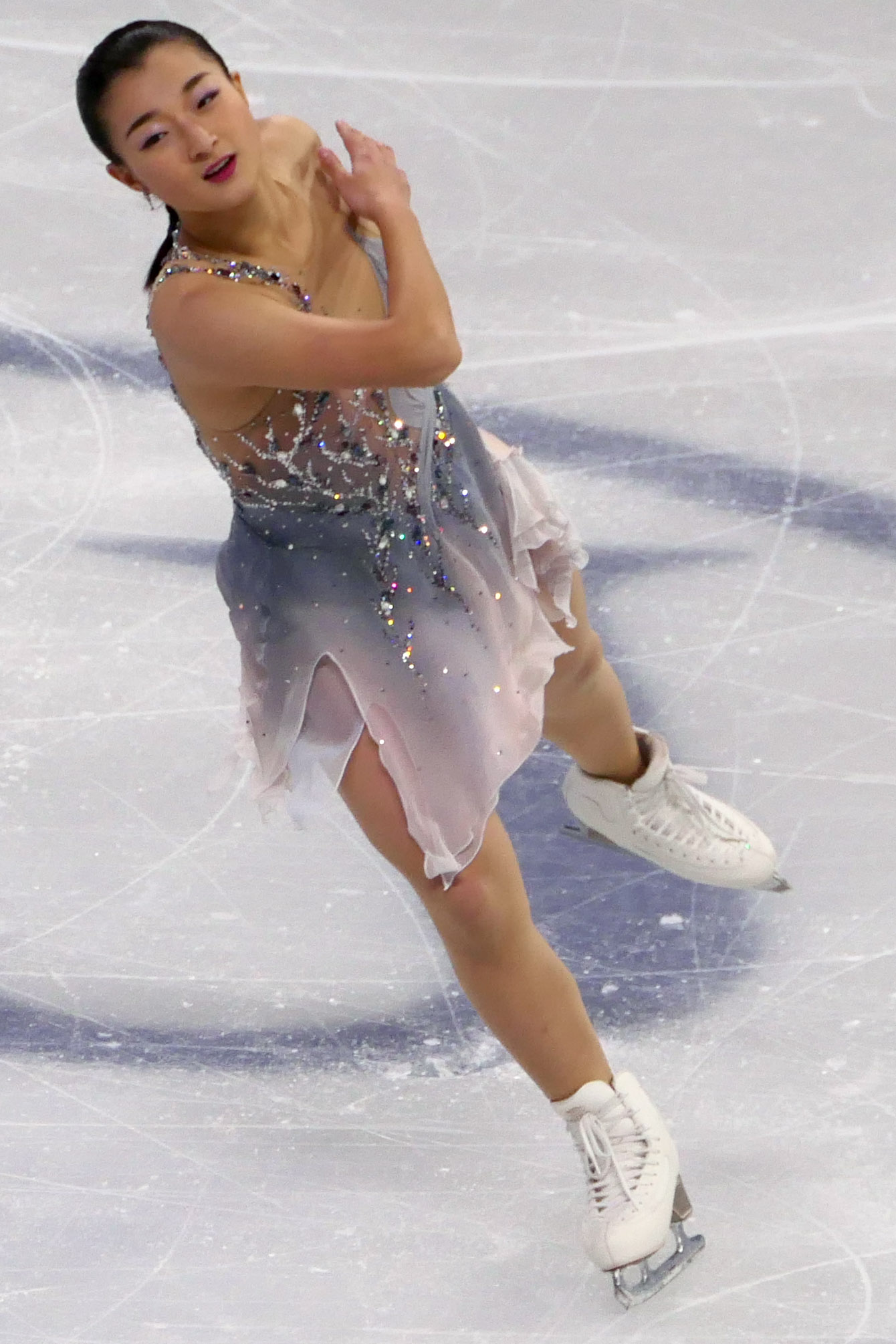
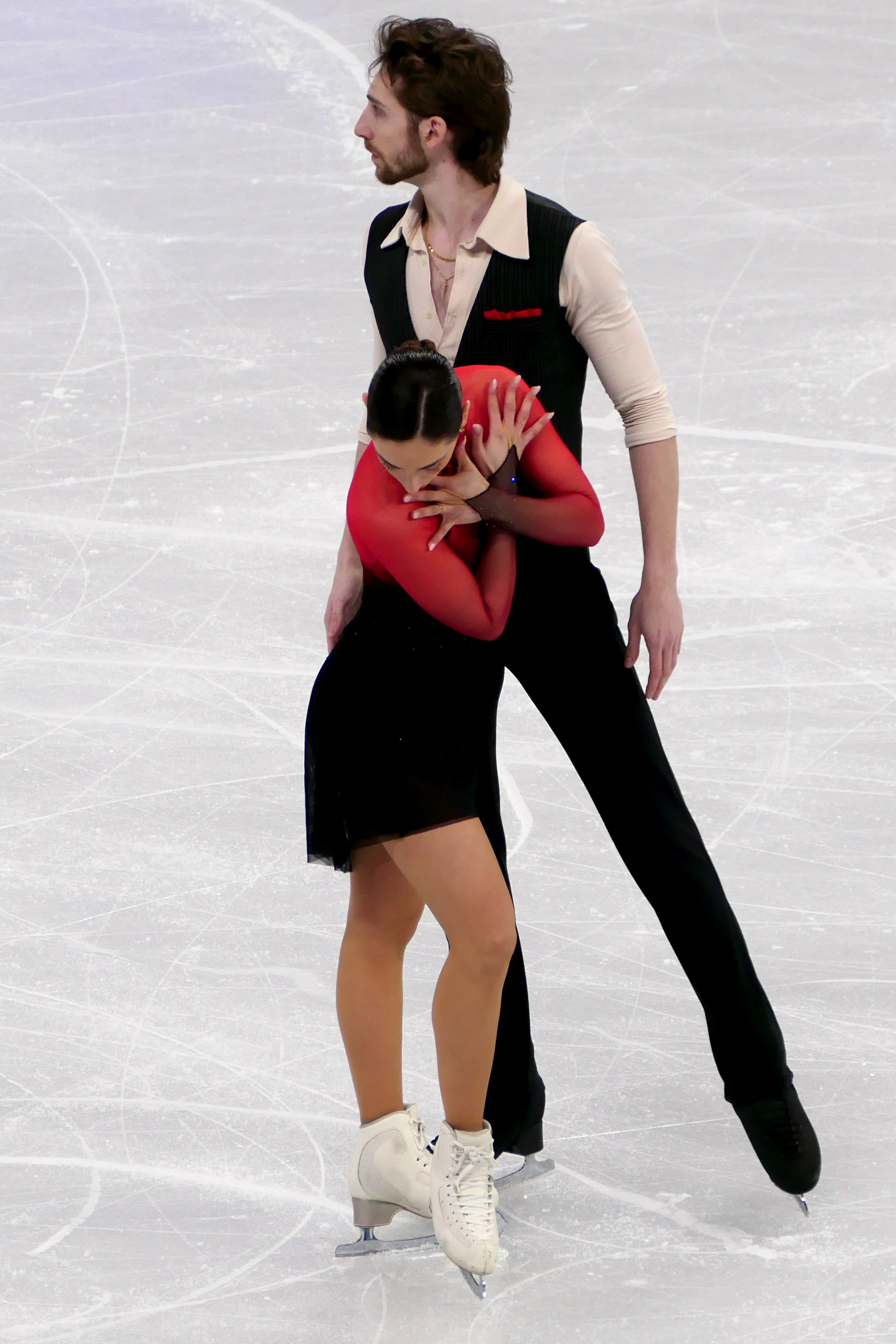
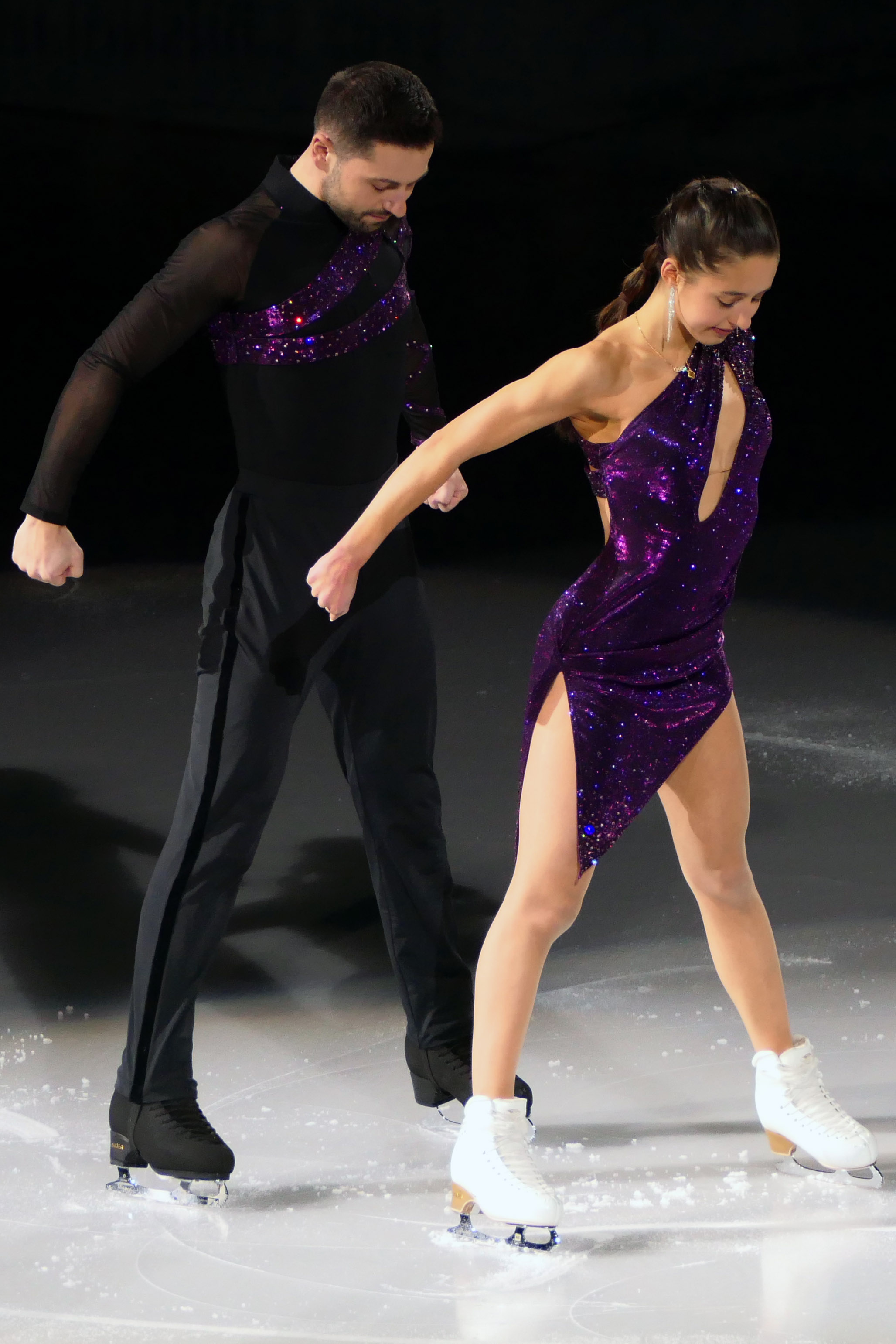
The 2025 NHK Trophy champions: Yuma Kagiyama of Japan (men's singles); Kaori Sakamoto of Japan (women's singles); Sara Conti and Niccolò Macii of Italy (pair skating); and Lilah Fear and Lewis Gibson of Great Britain (ice dance)

Medalists
Discipline	Gold	Silver	Bronze
Men	(Japan) Yuma Kagiyama	(Japan) Shun Sato	(Switzerland) Lukas Britschgi
Women	(Japan) Kaori Sakamoto	(Kazakhstan) Sofia Samodelkina	(Belgium) Loena Hendrickx
Pairs	(Italy); Sara Conti; Niccolò Macii	(Hungary); Maria Pavlova; Alexei Sviatchenko	(China); Sui Wenjing; Han Cong
Ice dance	(United Kingdom); Lilah Fear; Lewis Gibson	(Italy); Charlène Guignard; Marco Fabbri	(United States); Caroline Green; Michael Parsons

== Results ==
=== Men's singles ===
Yuma Kagiyama of Japan won his third consecutive title at the NHK Trophy, narrowly defeating Shun Sato, also of Japan, by a margin of fewer than two points. Kagiyama had been in the lead after the short program, but placed second in the free skate after falling on his quadruple toe loop; nevertheless, he finished the competition in first place. "What I've come to realize through the two skates is that I don't have enough confidence, Kagiyama stated. "I need to practice harder... so I can have that confidence when the chips are down." Sato guaranteed his spot at the 2025 Grand Prix Final with his second-place finish here and his previous win at the 2025 Cup of China. Lukas Britschgi of Switzerland finished in third place.

Men's results
Rank	Skater	Nation	Total points	SP		FS	
1st place, gold medalist(s)	Yuma Kagiyama	Japan	287.24	1	98.58	2	188.66
2nd place, silver medalist(s)	Shun Sato	Japan	285.71	2	96.67	1	189.04
3rd place, bronze medalist(s)	Lukas Britschgi	Switzerland	246.94	5	83.45	3	163.49
4	Jin Boyang	China	239.05	4	83.92	5	155.13
5	Cha Jun-hwan	South Korea	230.26	3	91.60	10	138.66
6	Adam Hagara	Slovakia	230.00	9	72.52	4	157.48
7	Matteo Rizzo	Italy	229.60	7	76.11	6	153.49
8	François Pitot	France	229.47	6	78.24	7	151.23
9	Andrew Torgashev	United States	212.01	8	75.75	11	136.26
10	Jimmy Ma	United States	208.56	10	69.44	9	139.12
11	Gabriele Frangipani	Italy	204.64	11	64.78	8	139.86
12	Haru Kakiuchi	Japan	186.40	12	61.59	12	124.81

=== Women's singles ===
Kaori Sakamoto of Japan delivered what Reuters called "a masterclass", earning 150.13 points in the free skate and winning the women's event. This was her best score of the season. Sakamoto had announced in June her intent to retire after the 2026 Winter Olympics. "I know that there are very few competitions left, so I really wanted to do my best and make sure that I give the best performance possible," Sakamoto said. Sofia Samodelkina of Kazakhstan finished in second place, while Loena Hendrickx of Belgium finished in third. Hendrickx had also hinted that the Winter Olympics would likely mark the end of her competitive career. After praising Sakamoto for her consistency and positive contributions to the sport of figure skating, Hendrickx acknowledged how difficult the sport has become as she has grown older. "Figure skating is very hard for the body and physically, but also mentally for me, especially. I don't know about [Sakamoto], but mentally, it's very hard as well to perform every time," Hendrickx stated prior to the NHK Trophy.

Women's results
Rank	Skater	Nation	Total points	SP		FS	
1st place, gold medalist(s)	Kaori Sakamoto	Japan	227.18	1	77.05	1	150.13
2nd place, silver medalist(s)	Sofia Samodelkina	Kazakhstan	200.00	2	67.75	3	132.25
3rd place, bronze medalist(s)	Loena Hendrickx	Belgium	198.97	4	62.45	2	136.52
4	You Young	South Korea	198.82	3	67.66	4	131.16
5	Sarah Everhardt	United States	186.69	6	61.41	6	125.28
6	Yuna Aoki	Japan	183.31	9	56.72	5	126.59
7	Yun Ah-sun	South Korea	180.23	5	61.51	7	118.72
8	Anna Pezzetta	Italy	173.75	7	61.35	9	112.40
9	Wakaba Higuchi	Japan	168.27	10	53.15	8	115.12
10	Elyce Lin-Gracey	United States	162.41	8	60.62	10	101.79
11	Katherine Medland Spence	Canada	146.63	11	48.42	11	98.21
12	Livia Kaiser	Switzerland	134.21	12	47.95	12	86.26

=== Pairs ===
Sara Conti and Niccolò Macii of Italy defeated Olympic champions Sui Wenjing and Han Cong of China and won the pairs event. Sui and Han had been in the lead after the short program, but finished in third place after they placed fourth in the free skate. Sui and Han were the 2022 Winter Olympic pairs champions, and Sui made the decision to return to competitive skating when she determined that China was having difficulty qualifying skaters for the 2026 Winter Olympics. "At present, Chinese figure skating is facing severe tests in qualifying for the Milano Winter Olympics, so as a senior athlete, I wanted to play a role in mentoring and helping others," Sui stated. "I hope to able to lead the younger generation to a brighter future, especially in pairs skating." Conti and Macii officially qualified for the 2025 Grand Prix Final with their win. Maria Pavlova and Alexei Sviatchenko of Hungary finished in second place.

Pairs results
Rank	Team	Nation	Total points	SP		FS	
1st place, gold medalist(s)	Sara Conti; Niccolò Macii	Italy	208.58	2	73.69	1	134.89
2nd place, silver medalist(s)	Maria Pavlova; Alexei Sviatchenko	Hungary	207.28	3	73.04	2	134.24
3rd place, bronze medalist(s)	Sui Wenjing; Han Cong	China	203.79	1	74.63	4	129.16
4	Yuna Nagaoka; Sumitada Moriguchi	Japan	202.11	4	71.52	3	130.59
5	Alisa Efimova; Misha Mitrofanov	United States	193.00	5	69.21	5	123.79
6	Emily Chan; Spencer Akira Howe	United States	187.40	6	63.82	6	123.58
7	Daria Danilova; Michel Tsiba	Netherlands	155.20	7	56.74	7	98.46

=== Ice dance ===
Lilah Fear and Lewis Gibson of Great Britain secured a spot at the 2025 Grand Prix Final with their win and a second-place finish at the 2025 Grand Prix de France. Fear and Gibson's free dance set to a Scottish medley earned top scores for their twizzles, dance spins, and lifts. Gibson spoke about the importance of their Scottish free dance: "I have so much pride in my country and getting to skate to Scottish music is such a dream come true." Charlène Guignard and Marco Fabbri of Italy finished in second place, bringing their total number of Grand Prix medals won to thirteen. Caroline Green and Michael Parsons of the United States, who had withdrawn from the 2025 Skate Canada International the previous weekend due to injury, finished in third place.

Maia and Alex Shibutani of the United States made their first appearance in international competition at the 2025 NHK Trophy since winning two bronze medals at the 2018 Winter Olympics (one in the ice dance event and one in the team event). "Returning after seven years is certainly ambitious... and so for that to be our first time out there, I feel very proud of the way that we performed," Maia Shibutani stated after finishing sixth in the rhythm dance. "We've spent a lot of time in Japan over the course of the past seven years and so that deepened our relationship to our heritage and our identity," Alex Shibutani added. "So it was a way for us to express who we are now seven years after leaving competitive skating for a break." The Shibutanis ended up finishing in sixth place, admitting that their scores were not up to their usual standards. The Shibutanis' return at the NHK Trophy took place one month after a video was leaked online showing Alex berating and yelling at Maia for eleven minutes, including calling her an "idiot" and a "jackass". The siblings addressed the video after the rhythm dance. "Unfortunately, I lost my temper in training and it shouldn’t have happened," Alex said. "I apologized to Maia right after our practice ... but it was wrong and I am committed to being a better teammate." Maia also defended Alex, adding: "When you are working toward being your best there are going to be intense moments, but for us we understand each other and the process and we work through it together like siblings do. We continued practicing that day and we choose each other every time."

Ice dance results
Rank	Team	Nation	Total points	RD		FD	
1st place, gold medalist(s)	Lilah Fear; Lewis Gibson	Great Britain	205.88	1	81.57	1	124.31
2nd place, silver medalist(s)	Charlène Guignard; Marco Fabbri	Italy	198.67	2	76.36	2	122.31
3rd place, bronze medalist(s)	Caroline Green; Michael Parsons	United States	187.90	3	75.14	3	112.76
4	Natálie Taschlerová; Filip Taschler	Czech Republic	183.33	4	74.70	6	108.63
5	Katarina Wolfkostin; Dimitry Tsarevski	United States	182.85	5	72.12	4	110.73
6	Maia Shibutani; Alex Shibutani	United States	180.50	6	71.74	5	108.76
7	Jennifer Janse van Rensburg; Benjamin Steffan	Germany	177.54	7	69.73	7	107.81
8	Yuka Orihara; Juho Pirinen	Finland	175.52	10	67.93	8	107.59
9	Alicia Fabbri; Paul Ayer	Canada	174.71	9	68.53	9	106.18
10	Utana Yoshida; Masaya Morita	Japan	155.28	8	69.61	10	85.67

== Works cited ==
- "Special Regulations & Technical Rules – Single & Pair Skating and Ice Dance 2024" (PDF). International Skating Union. Archived (PDF) from the original on June 3, 2025.
