= Böhmischer Traum =

Böhmischer Traum ("Bohemian Dream") is a polka written by the German composer Norbert Gälle in 1997. It was first played and recorded by the music group Scherzachtaler Blasmusik, of which Norbert Gälle is a member. The piece became a success far beyond the borders of Germany.

== History ==
Norbert Gälle began to compose music in 1996. Böhmischer Traum is one of his early works. He came up with the title after having a night full of weird dreams. Later, the German music publisher Siegfried Rundel heard the piece in the radio. He put forward the idea of publishing the notes of the composition, to which Norbert Gälle agreed after some hesitation.

Böhmischer Traum became a part of many brass bands' musical repertoire. It was also adopted into electronic music.
