= Little Drop of Poison =

Little Drop of Poison is the seventh album by Rebekka Bakken recorded with hr-Bigband from Frankfurt, Germany and released on May 23, 2014 under Emarcy Records (Universal Music).

In 2013, Bakken took on the songs of Tom Waits in a collaboration with the hr-Bigband and Jörg Achim Keller, "which perfectly suits the emotional range she can access in her craft." This resulted in releasing the album in 2014 named after Tom Waits' song that was originally one of the songs of The End of Violence official soundtrack back in 1997.

Joachim Schreiner from the Frankfurter Neue Presse wrote: "Songs from all the creative phases of Tom Waits, genius orchestrated for the HR Big Band and animated by one of the most striking European women's voices: Who can resist? The premiere concerts were completely sold out as the nordic elf, Rebekka Bakken in February 2013 together with the jazz orchestra of the Hessian Rundfunks interpreted the songs of the garbage can man, Tom Waits."

== Track listing ==
No.	Title	Length
1.	"Broken Bicycles"	3:41
2.	"Please, Call Me Baby"	4:27
3.	"Little Drop of Poison"	3:07
4.	"Downtown"	5:10
5.	"Hang On St. Christopher"	3:33
6.	"Bad as Me"	3:14
7.	"Christmas Card from a Hooker in Minneapolis"	4:44
8.	"Just the Right Bullets"	3:17
9.	"I Can't Wait to Get Off Work"	3:45
10.	"I Wish I Was in New Orleans"	4:03
11.	"Time"	4:45
12.	"San Diego Serenade"	3:13
13.	"Yesterday Is Here"	3:45
14.	"Saving All My Love for You"	3:19
15.	"If I Have to Go"	2:47
16.	"What's He Building?"	3:51
