= Mgzavrebi =

Georgian music band

Mgzavrebi მგზავრები
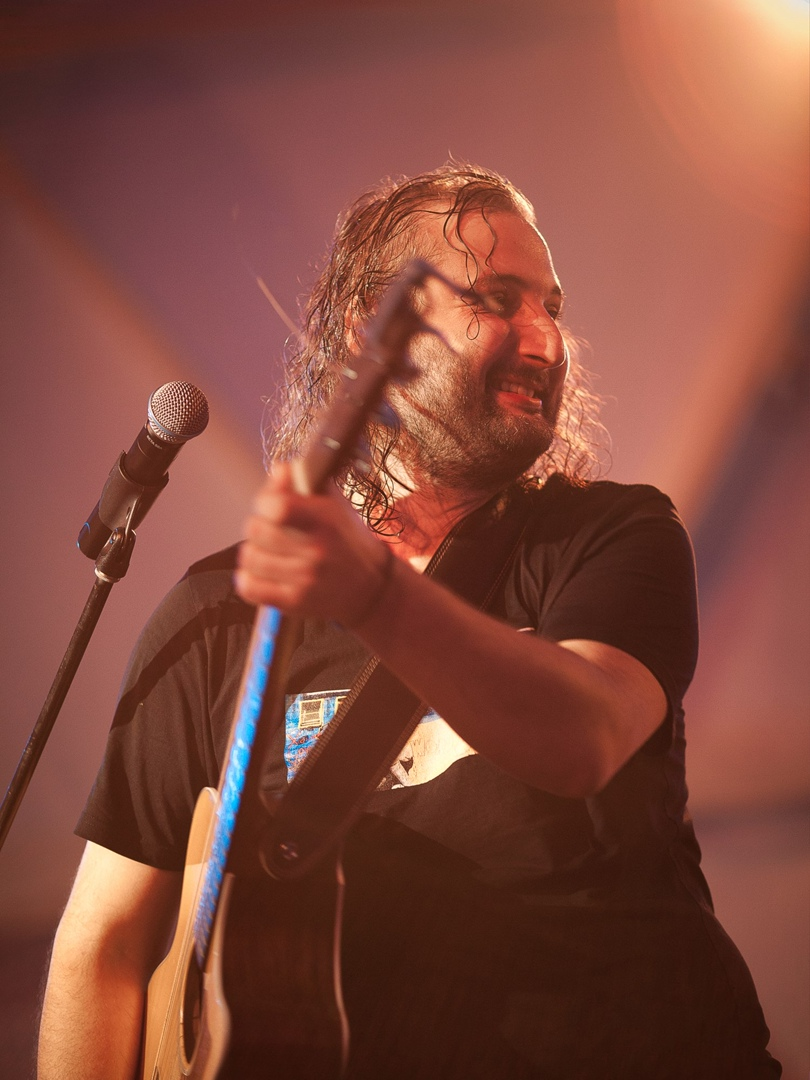
- Gigi Dedalamazishvili from Mgzavrebi performing at DOT rooftop in Saint Petersburg in July 2017

Background information
- Origin: Tbilisi, Georgia
- Genres: folk rock, soft rock, indie folk, indie pop, georgian folk
- Years active: 2006-present
- Members: Gigi Dedalamazishvili; Lasha Dokhnadze; Misha Megrelishvili; Dato Gogelia; Bezho Amiranashvili; Guga Kublashvili; Dato Ugrekhelidze
- Website: www.mgzavrebi.com

Mgzavrebi is a Georgian group formed in 2006.

== History ==
Mgzavrebi was founded in 2006 by Gigi Dedalamazishvili, an actor from Tbilisi, Georgia. The grandfather of Gigi Dedalamazishvili was a conductor and he taught Gigi how to play piano and together with his mother supported Gigi getting a music education, but Gigi did not enjoy going to music school when he was young. Already after the start of his career as an actor, Gigi formed a music band in 2006 with initially only three musicians in it. The number of group participants varied within following years reaching 17–18 people but eventually Mgzavrebi included 7 professional musicians.

The band released its first album "Me Movigone" in 2008. Mgzavrebi became popular after the song played in Davit Imedashvili's movie "Dream Town" (2010, Georgian: ოცნების ქალაქი). In 2013 they recorded an album "Wait live wait" (Russian: "Ждать жить ждать") together with a Russian writer Yevgeni Grishkovetz reaching 6th place in the most downloaded albums in Russian iTunes. In 2016 Mgzavrebi won a "Chart Dozen" Award from a Russian Nashe Radio station in the "Breakthrough" nomination; the group was also nominated in the category "Song of the year" with the composition "Let's break through" (Russian: Прорвемся) but eventually lost to the Russian rock band Animal Jazz. In 2017, Mgzavrebi won the "Golden Gargoyle" award in the nomination "Best group". In 2018, a music video of the song "Promise" Russian: Пообещай) directed by Ivan Sosnin was nominated by the Berlin Music Video Awards in the section Best Low Budget. In 2023 a famous Georgian director Lado Kvataniya, who previously collaborated with Kanye West, Manizha, and Oxxxymiron, released a short music film called Waltz featuring Mgzavrebi.

The name of the band means "Travellers". The musical style of the group is a combination of traditional Georgian singing and the modern sound of national instruments, such as panduri. Mgzavrebi lyrics are mostly in Georgian but also include several songs in Russian and Ukrainian. After February 2022, the group decided to cancel all their concerts and not to give any new concerts in Russia.

== Discography ==
=== Studio albums ===
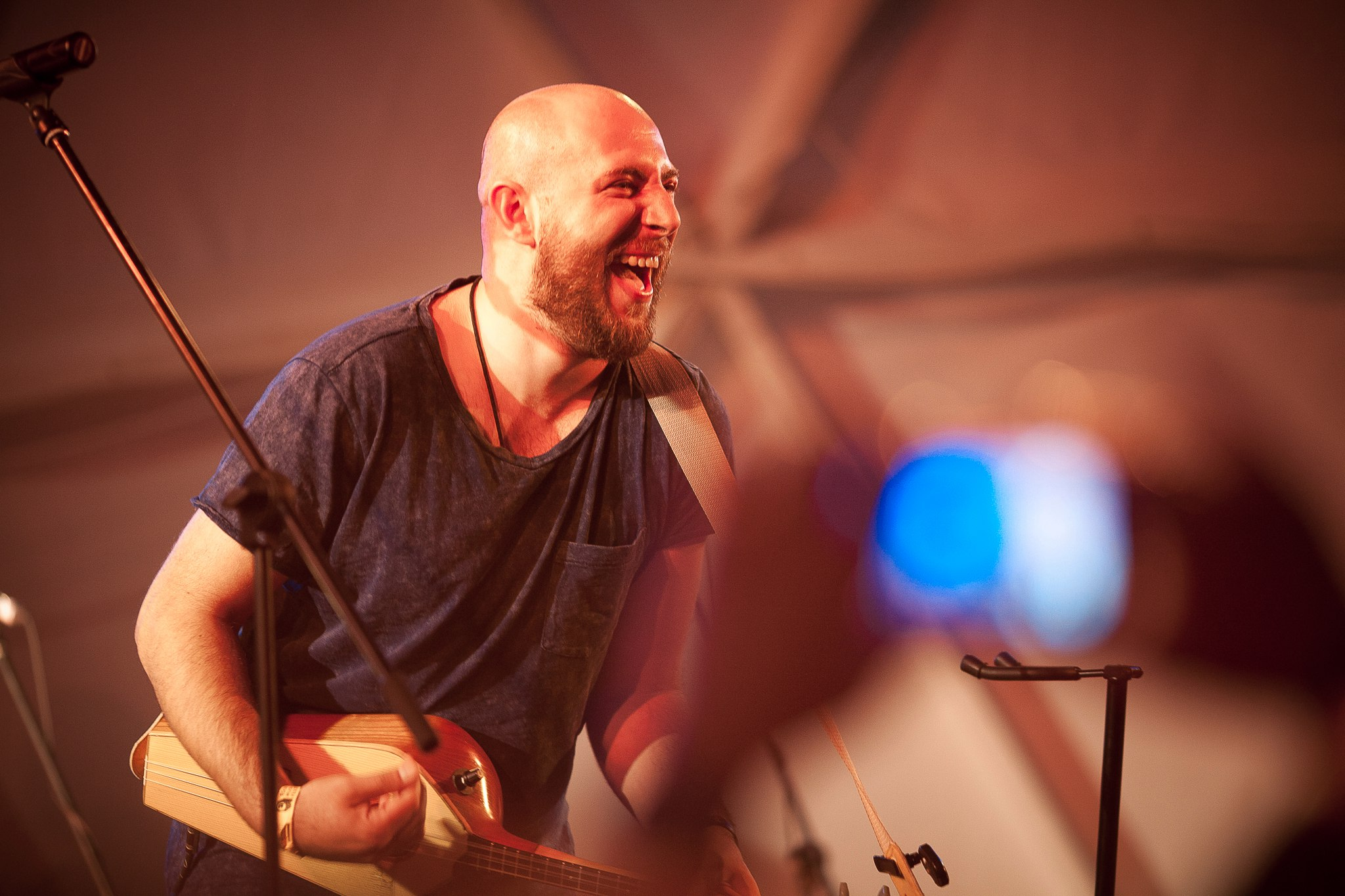
Bejo Amiranashvili

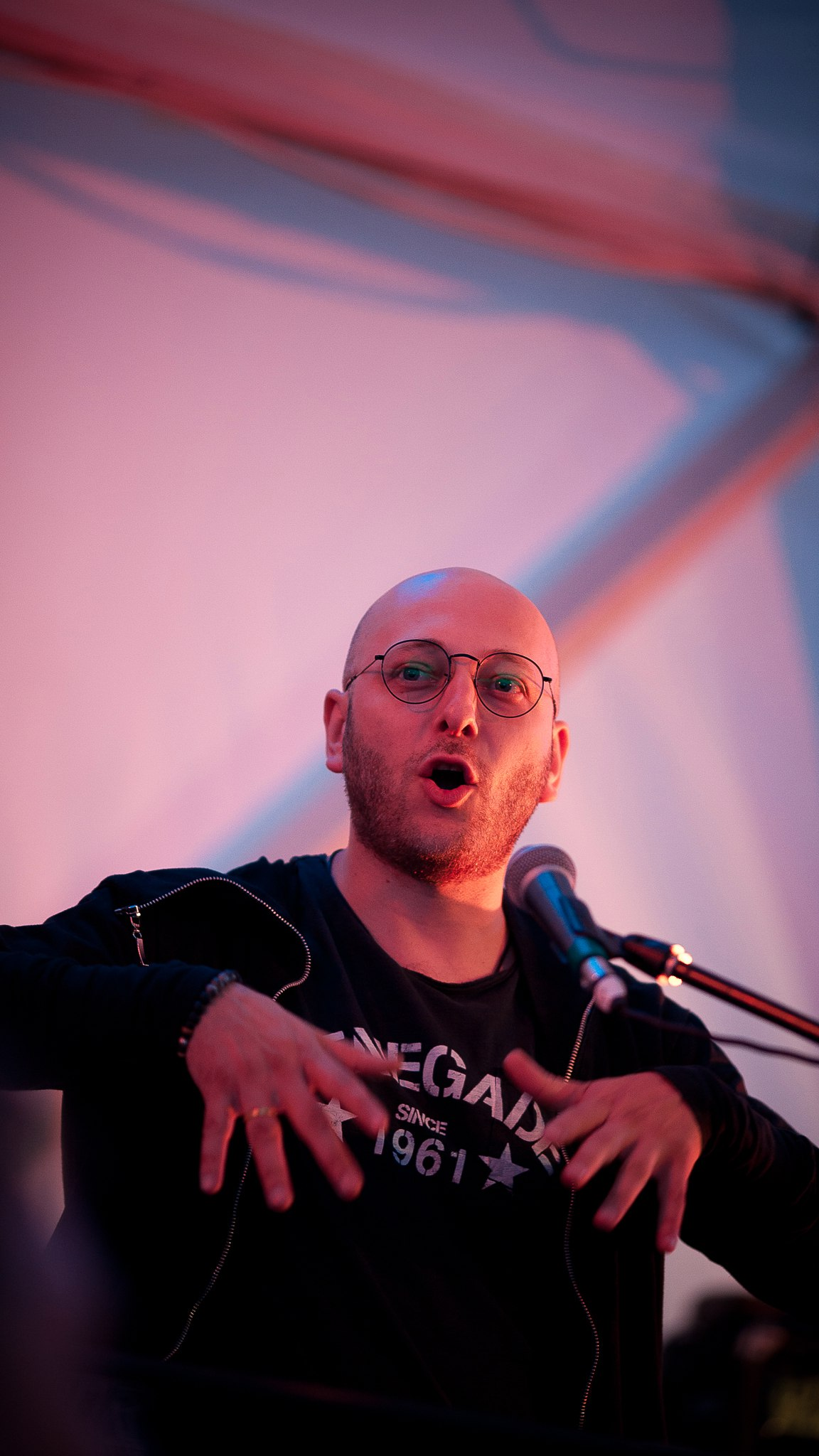
Davit Ugrekhelidze

- Me Movigone... (Georgian: მე მოვიგონე... — I made it up...) (2008)
- Meore albomi (Georgian: მეორე ალბომი — Second Album) (2011)
- Mgzavruli (Georgian: მგზავრული — Journey) (2013)
- In vino veritas (2017)
- Iasamani (Georgian: იასამანი — Lilac) (2018)
- Krebuli (Georgian: კრებული — Collection) (2018)
- Geo (Georgian: გეო) (2018)
- Kamara (Georgian: კამარა — Arch) (2023)

== Members ==
=== Current line-up ===
- Gigi Dedalamazishvili — songwriter, guitar, vocal
- Lasha Dokhnadze — percussion, vocal
- Misha Megrelishvili — recitative, shaker
- Dato Gogelia — bass guitar, harmonica, vocal
- Bezho Amiranashvili — vocal, electric guitar, panduri
- Guga Kublashvili — vocal, panduri, flute
- Dato Ugrekhelidze — vocal, keyboards

=== Producer ===
- Otar Edisherashvili

=== Former members ===
former members

- Gigi Gegelashvili – flute, piano
- Gvantsa Mathashvili - cello
- Nini Dedalamazishvili - vocals
- Rezo Buadze - vocals
- Giorgi Akhvlediani - vocals
- Irakli Sarava - vocals

== Awards and nominations ==
Award Ceremony	Year	Work	Category	Result
Berlin Music Video Awards	2023	Waltz	Best Director	Nominated
