= Rebekka Bakken =

Norwegian singer, songwriter and music producer

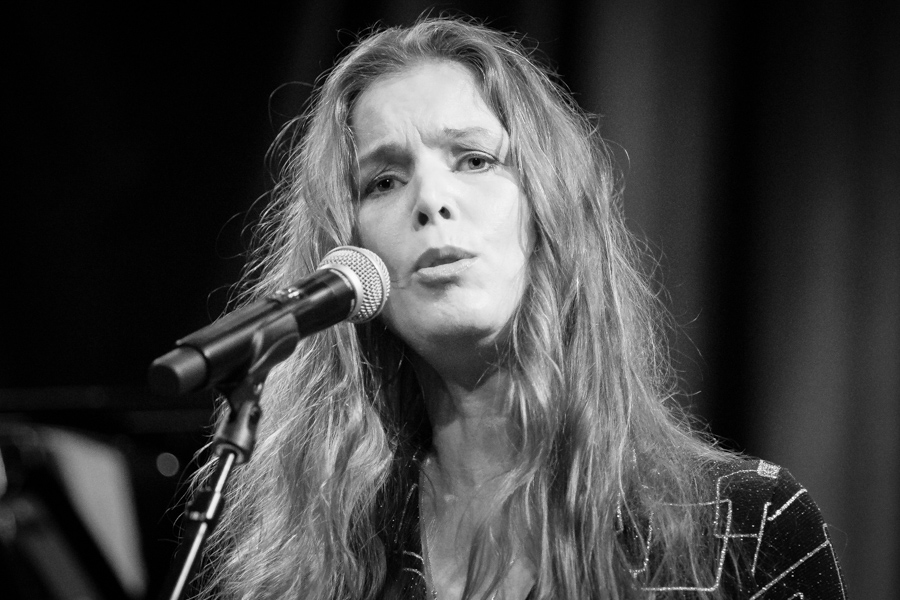
- Rebekka Bakken at the 2017 Oslo Jazz Festival

Background information
- Born: 4 April 1970 (age 56); Lier, near Oslo, Norway
- Genres: Jazz, pop, folk, country, adult contemporary
- Occupation: Musician
- Instrument: Piano
- Labels: EmArcy, Universal, Sony
- Website: rebekkabakken.com

Rebekka Bakken (born 4 April 1970) is a Norwegian singer, songwriter and music producer who is often associated with jazz, although she refuses to characterise herself as a jazz musician. Her voice reaches over three octaves.

== Career ==
Bakken was born in Lier, near Oslo. She began singing in various school bands, before beginning to sing with professional soul, funk and rock bands in 1988. She is known for her particularly expressive and varied voice, performing music that is a combination of folk, jazz and pop.In addition to her native norwegian, she also sings in German and English.

== Honors ==
- 2007: Recipient of the Amadeus Austrian Music Award in the category jazz/blues/folk for her album I Keep My Cool

== Discography ==
=== Solo ===
- 2003: The Art of How to Fall (EmArcy/Universal)
- 2005: Is That You? (Boutique/Universal)
- 2006: I Keep My Cool (EmArcy/Universal)
- 2007: Building Visions (Universal)
- 2009: Morning Hours (EmArcy/Universal)
- 2011: September (EmArcy/Universal)
- 2014: Little Drop of Poison (EmArcy/Universal)
- 2016: Most Personal (EmArcy/Universal)
- 2018: Things You Leave Behind (Okeh/Sony)
- 2020: Winter Nights (Okeh/Sony)
- 2023: Always On My Mind (Sony)
- 2025: Nord (Supreme Music Group)

=== Duo ===
with Wolfgang Muthspiel

- 2000: Daily Mirror (Material)
- 2001: Daily Mirror Reflected (Material)
- 2002: Beloved with Wolfgang Muthspiel (Material)

=== Collaborations ===
- 2003: Scattering Poems (ACT), with Julia Hülsmann Trio
- 2003: Heaven (ACT), with Christof Lauer & Norwegian Brass with Sondre Bratland, Geir Lysne
