= 2015–16 figure skating season =

Competitive figure skating year, 2015/7/1 to 2016/6/30

- Date: July 1, 2015 – June 30, 2016
- Previous: 2014–15
- Next: 2016–17

The 2015–16 figure skating season began on July 1, 2015, and ended on June 30, 2016. During this season, elite skaters competed at the 2016 European Championships, Four Continents Championships, World Junior Championships, and World Championships. They also competed at elite events such as the Grand Prix series and Junior Grand Prix series, culminating at the Grand Prix Final, and the Challenger Series.

== Age eligibility ==
Skaters were eligible to compete in International Skating Union (ISU) events at the junior or senior levels according to their age. These rules may not have applied to non-ISU events such as national championships.

Level	Date of birth
Junior (females in all disciplines; males in singles)	Born between July 1, 1996 & June 30, 2002
Junior (males in pairs & ice dance)	Born between July 1, 1994 & June 30, 2002
Senior (all disciplines)	Born before July 1, 2000

== Changes ==
If skaters of different nationalities formed a team, the ISU required that they choose one country to represent. The date provided is the date when the change occurred or, if not available, the date when the change was announced.

=== Partnership changes ===
Date	Skaters	Disc.	Type	Ref.
July 6, 2015	(Japan) Narumi Takahashi / Alexandr Zaboev	Pairs	Formed	
July 10, 2015	(United Kingdom) Olivia Smart / Joseph Buckland	Ice dance	Dissolved	
July 31, 2015	(France) Daria Popova / Andrei Novoselov	Pairs	Dissolved	
July 31, 2015	(France) Lola Esbrat / Andrei Novoselov	Pairs	Formed	
August 9, 2015	(Japan) Ami Koga / Francis Boudreau Audet	Pairs	Dissolved	
August 9, 2015	(Japan) Ami Koga / Spencer Howe	Pairs	Formed	
August 9, 2015	(Japan) Sumire Suto / Francis Boudreau Audet	Pairs	Formed	
October 16, 2015	(Spain) Sara Hurtado / Adrià Díaz	Ice dance	Dissolved	
December 13, 2015	(Spain) Olivia Smart / Adrià Díaz	Ice dance	Formed	
January 7, 2016	(Norway) Thea Rabe / Timothy Koleto	Ice dance	Dissolved	
January 8, 2016	(Germany) Jennifer Urban / Sevan Lerche	Ice dance	Dissolved	
March 10, 2016	(United States) Gretchen Donlan / Nathan Bartholomay	Pairs	Dissolved	
April 1, 2016	(Finland) Juulia Turkkila / Matthias Versluis	Ice dance	Formed	
April 8, 2016	(Italy) Misato Komatsubara / Andrea Fabbri	Ice dance	Dissolved	
April 26, 2016	(China) Peng Cheng / Zhang Hao	Pairs	Dissolved	
April 26, 2016	(China) Yu Xiaoyu / Jin Yang	Pairs	Dissolved	
April 26, 2016	(China) Yu Xiaoyu / Zhang Hao	Pairs	Formed	
April 26, 2016	(China) Peng Cheng / Jin Yang	Pairs	Formed	
May 2, 2016	(Russia) Anna Yanovskaya / Sergey Mozgov	Ice dance	Dissolved	
May 2, 2016	(Russia) Betina Popova / Sergey Mozgov	Ice dance	Formed	
May 18, 2016	(Japan) Narumi Takahashi / Ryo Shibata	Pairs	Formed	
May 23, 2016	(United States) Ashley Cain / Timothy LeDuc	Pairs	Formed	
June 12, 2016	(Canada) Vanessa Grenier / Maxime Deschamps	Pairs	Dissolved	
June 12, 2016	(United Kingdom) Zoe Wilkinson / Christopher Boyadji	Pairs	Formed	
June 18, 2016	(Russia) Anna Yanovskaya / Ivan Guryanov	Ice dance	Formed	

=== Retirements ===
Date	Skater(s)	Disc.	Ref.
July 24, 2015	(Hong Kong) Ronald Lam	Men	
July 27, 2015	(United States) Caydee Denney / John Coughlin	Pairs	
July 31, 2015	(France) Daria Popova	Pairs	
August 27, 2015	(Finland) Kiira Korpi	Ladies	
September 10, 2015	(United Kingdom) Caitlin Yankowskas / Hamish Gaman	Pairs	
September 10, 2015	(Israel) Danielle Montalbano	Pairs	
September 22, 2015	(Russia) Katarina Gerboldt	Pairs	
December 24, 2015	(Russia) Artur Gachinski	Men	
January 28, 2016	(France) Florent Amodio	Men	
March 15, 2016	(Japan) Takahiko Kozuka	Men	
April 4, 2016	(China) Song Nan	Men	
June 1, 2016	(Russia) Konstantin Menshov	Men	
June 12, 2016	(Canada) Vanessa Grenier	Pairs	
June 15, 2016	(Canada) Hayleigh Bell / Rudi Swiegers	Pairs	
June 16, 2016	(Canada) Nicole Orford / Asher Hill	Ice dance	

=== Coaching changes ===
Date	Skater(s)	Disc.	From	To	Ref.
July 13, 2015	(Canada) Andréanne Poulin / Marc-André Servant	Ice dance	Shawn Winter & Elise Hamel	Carol Lane, Juris Razgulajevs & Jon Lane	
October 8, 2015	(Russia) Serafima Sakhanovich	Ladies	Alina Pisarenko	Evgeni Rukavicin	
November 18, 2015	(Russia) Yulia Lipnitskaya	Ladies	Eteri Tutberidze & Sergei Dudakov	Alexei Urmanov	
December 13, 2015	(United Kingdom) Olivia Smart	Ice dance	Evgeni Platov & Philip Askew	Marie-France Dubreuil, Patrice Lauzon & Romain Haguenauer	
February 20, 2016	(Canada) Tessa Virtue / Scott Moir	Ice dance	Marina Zueva, Oleg Epstein & Johnny Johns	Marie-France Dubreuil & Patrice Lauzon	
March 10, 2016	(Russia) Adian Pitkeev	Men	Eteri Tutberidze & Sergei Dudakov	Elena Buianova	
March 10, 2016	(Russia) Sergei Voronov	Men	Eteri Tutberidze & Sergei Dudakov	Inna Goncharenko	
April 9, 2016	(Russia) Maria Sotskova	Ladies	Svetlana Panova	Elena Buianova	
April 24, 2016	(Canada) Nam Nguyen	Men	Brian Orser, Ernest Pryhitka & Tracy Wilson	David Glynn	
April 25, 2016	(United States) Haven Denney / Brandon Frazier	Pairs	Ingo Steuer	Rockne Brubaker & Stefania Berton	
May 16, 2016	(Russia) Maxim Kovtun	Men	Elena Buianova	Inna Goncharenko	
June 2, 2016	(China) Li Zijun	Ladies	Gao Haijin	Mingzhu Li & Pang Qing	
June 2, 2016	(China) Yan Han	Men	Shuguang Jia	Mingzhu Li & Pang Qing	
June 20, 2016	(Czech Republic) Michal Březina	Men	Karel Fajfr	Rafael Arutunian	

== International competitions ==
Code key

- S – Senior event
- J – Junior event
- N – Novice event
- M – Men's singles
- L – Ladies' singles
- P – Pair skating
- D – Ice dance

Color key

- ISU Championships
- Grand Prix or Junior Grand Prix
- Challenger Series
- Winter Youth Olympics
- Other competition

2015
Dates	Event	Type	Level	Disc.	Location	Results
July 16–19	Philadelphia Summer International	Other	S/J	M/L	Philadelphia, Pennsylvania, United States	
July 30–31	Lake Placid Ice Dance International	Other	S/J	D	Lake Placid, New York, United States	
August 5–8	Asian Open Trophy	Other	All	M/L	Bangkok, Thailand	Details
August 19–23	JGP Slovakia	Grand Prix	Junior	M/L/D	Bratislava, Slovakia	Details
August 26–30	JGP Latvia	Grand Prix	Junior	All	Riga, Latvia	Details
September 2–6	JGP United States	Grand Prix	Junior	All	Colorado Springs, Colorado, United States	Details
September 9–13	JGP Austria	Grand Prix	Junior	All	Linz, Austria	Details
September 16–20	U.S. International Classic	Challenger	Senior	All	Salt Lake City, Utah, United States	Details
September 17–20	Lombardia Trophy	Other	All	All	Sesto San Giovanni, Italy	Details
September 23–27	JGP Poland	Grand Prix	Junior	All	Toruń, Poland	Details
September 24–26	Nebelhorn Trophy	Challenger	Senior	All	Oberstdorf, Germany	Details
October 1–3	Ondrej Nepela Trophy	Challenger	Senior	All	Bratislava, Slovakia	Details
October 1–4	JGP Spain	Grand Prix	Junior	M/L/D	Logroño, Spain	Details
October 3	Japan Open	Other	Senior	M/L	Tokyo, Japan	Details
October 7–11	JGP Croatia	Grand Prix	Junior	M/L/D	Zagreb, Croatia	Details
October 8–11	Finlandia Trophy	Challenger	Senior	M/L/D	Espoo, Finland	Details
October 9–11	Ice Star	Other	All	M/L/D	Minsk, Belarus	Details
October 12–15	Autumn Classic International	Other	S/J	All	Barrie, Ontario, Canada	Details
October 14–18	International Cup of Nice	Other	S/J	All	Nice, France	Details
October 15–18	Mordovian Ornament	Challenger	Senior	All	Saransk, Russia	Details
October 20–25	Denkova-Staviski Cup	Challenger	All	M/L/D	Sofia, Bulgaria	Details
October 22–25	Tirnavia Ice Cup	Other	J/N	M/L	Trnava, Slovakia	Details
October 23–25	Skate America	Grand Prix	Senior	All	Milwaukee, Wisconsin, United States	Details
October 27–31	Leo Scheu Memorial	Other	J/N	M/L	Graz, Austria	Details
October 27 - November 1	Ice Challenge	Challenger	Senior	All	Graz, Austria	Details
October 30 - November 1	Skate Canada International	Grand Prix	Senior	All	Lethbridge, Alberta, Canada	Details
November 3–8	Crystal Skate of Romania	Other	All	M/L	Brașov, Romania	Details
November 4–8	Volvo Open Cup	Other	All	All	Riga, Latvia	Details
November 6–8	Cup of China	Grand Prix	Senior	All	Beijing, China	Details
November 6–8	NRW Trophy	Other	All	D	Dortmund, Germany	Details
November 11–15	Skate Celje	Other	J/N	M/L	Celje, Slovenia	Details
November 12–15	Merano Cup	Other	All	M/L	Merano, Italy	Details
November 13–15	Trophée Éric Bompard	Grand Prix	Senior	All	Bordeaux, France	Details
November 18–21	Golden Bear of Zagreb	Other	All	M/L/P	Zagreb, Croatia	Details
November 18–22	Open d'Andorra	Other	All	All	Canillo, Andorra	Details
November 18–22	Tallinn Trophy	Challenger	Senior	All	Tallinn, Estonia	Details
November 20–22	Rostelecom Cup	Grand Prix	Senior	All	Moscow, Russia	Details
November 20–22	Grand Prix SNP	Other	J/N	M/L	Banská Bystrica, Slovakia	Details
November 20–22	Pavel Roman Memorial	Other	All	D	Olomouc, Czech Republic	Details
November 25–29	NRW Trophy	Other	All	M/L/P	Dortmund, Germany	Details
November 26–29	Warsaw Cup	Challenger	Senior	All	Warsaw, Poland	Details
November 27–29	NHK Trophy	Grand Prix	Senior	All	Nagano, Japan	Details
November 28 - December 4	Santa Claus Cup	Other	All	M/L/D	Budapest, Hungary	Details
December 2–5	Golden Spin of Zagreb	Challenger	Senior	All	Zagreb, Croatia	Details
December 10–13	Grand Prix Final	Grand Prix	S/J	All	Barcelona, Spain	Details
December 18–20	Grand Prix of Bratislava	Other	J/N	M/L/D	Bratislava, Slovakia	Details

2016
Dates	Event	Type	Level	Disc.	Location	Results
January 6–10	Mentor Toruń Cup	Other	All	All	Toruń, Poland	Details
January 15	Medal Winners Open	Other	Senior	M/L	Osaka, Japan	Details
January 19–23	Skate Helena	Other	All	M/L	Belgrade, Serbia	Details
January 21–24	Reykjavik International Games	Other	Senior	L	Reykjavík, Iceland	
January 21–24	Reykjavik International Games	Other	Junior	M/L	Reykjavík, Iceland	
January 22–23	FBMA Trophy	Other	All	M/L	Abu Dhabi, United Arab Emirates	Details
January 27–31	European Championships	Championships	Senior	All	Bratislava, Slovakia	Details
February 4–7	Dragon Trophy	Other	All	M/L	Ljubljana, Slovenia	Details
February 4–7	Sarajevo Open	Other	All	M/L/P	Sarajevo, Bosnia and Herzegovina	Details
February 10–14	Sofia Trophy	Other	All	M/L	Sofia, Bulgaria	Details
February 12–14	Jégvirág Cup	Other	Senior	L	Miskolc, Hungary	Details
February 12–14	Jégvirág Cup	Other	Junior	M/L	Miskolc, Hungary	Details
February 13–16	Winter Youth Olympics	Olympics	Junior	All	Lillehammer, Norway	Details 1, 2
February 16–21	Bavarian Open	Other	All	All	Oberstdorf, Germany	Details
February 18–21	Four Continents Championships	Championships	Senior	All	Taipei, Taiwan	Details
February 23–28	Hellmut Seibt Memorial	Other	All	All	Vienna, Austria	Details
February 24–28	Nordic Championships	Other	All	M/L	Aalborg, Denmark	Details
March 2–6	Sportland Trophy	Other	All	M/L	Budapest, Hungary	Details
March 9–13	Cup of Tyrol	Other	All	M/L/P	Innsbruck, Austria	Details
March 11–13	Coupe du Printemps	Other	All	M/L	Kockelscheuer, Luxembourg	Details
March 14–20	World Junior Championships	Championships	Junior	All	Debrecen, Hungary	Details
March 23–27	Triglav Trophy	Other	All	M/L	Jesenice, Slovenia	Details
March 28 – April 3	World Championships	Championships	Senior	All	Boston, Massachusetts, United States	Details
March 31 – April 2	Avas Cup	Other	All	M/L	Miskolc, Hungary	Details
March 31 – April 4	Coppa Europa	Other	Junior	L	Canazei, Italy	Details
April 10-12	Hamar Trophy	Other	All	M/L	Hamar, Norway	Details
April 11–17	World Development Trophy	Other	Junior	M/L	Gdańsk, Poland	Details
April 15–17	Gardena Spring Trophy	Other	All	M/L	Egna, Italy	Details
April 22–24	Team Challenge Cup	Other	Senior	All	Spokane, Washington, United States	Details

== International medalists ==
=== Men's singles ===
Championships
Competition	Gold	Silver	Bronze	Results
(Slovakia) European Championships	(Spain) Javier Fernández	(Israel) Oleksii Bychenko	(Russia) Maxim Kovtun	Details
(Taiwan) Four Continents Championships	(Canada) Patrick Chan	(China) Jin Boyang	(China) Yan Han	Details
(Hungary) World Junior Championships	(Israel) Daniel Samohin	(Canada) Nicolas Nadeau	(United States) Tomoki Hiwatashi	Details
(United States) World Championships	(Spain) Javier Fernández	(Japan) Yuzuru Hanyu	(China) Jin Boyang	Details

Grand Prix
Competition	Gold	Silver	Bronze	Results
(United States) Skate America	(United States) Max Aaron	(Japan) Shoma Uno	(United States) Jason Brown	Details
Skate Canada International	(Canada) Patrick Chan	(Japan) Yuzuru Hanyu	(Japan) Daisuke Murakami	Details
Cup of China	(Spain) Javier Fernández	(China) Jin Boyang	(China) Yan Han	Details
(France) Trophée Éric Bompard	(Japan) Shoma Uno	(Russia) Maxim Kovtun	(Japan) Daisuke Murakami	Details
(Russia) Rostelecom Cup	(Spain) Javier Fernández	(Russia) Adian Pitkeev	(United States) Ross Miner	Details
(Japan) NHK Trophy	(Japan) Yuzuru Hanyu	(China) Jin Boyang	(Japan) Takahito Mura	Details
(Spain) Grand Prix Final	(Japan) Yuzuru Hanyu	(Spain) Javier Fernández	(Japan) Shoma Uno	Details

Junior Grand Prix
Competition	Gold	Silver	Bronze	Results
JGP Slovakia	(Canada) Roman Sadovsky	(United States) Vincent Zhou	(Argentina) Denis Margalik	Details
JGP Latvia	(Russia) Dmitri Aliev	(Latvia) Deniss Vasiļjevs	(United States) Alexei Krasnozhon	Details
JGP United States	(United States) Nathan Chen	(Israel) Daniel Samohin	(Japan) Sota Yamamoto	Details
JGP Austria	(Russia) Dmitri Aliev	(United States) Vincent Zhou	(Ukraine) Ivan Pavlov	Details
JGP Poland	(Japan) Sota Yamamoto	(Latvia) Deniss Vasiļjevs	(Canada) Roman Sadovsky	Details
JGP Spain	(United States) Nathan Chen	(Israel) Daniel Samohin	(China) Zhang He	Details
JGP Croatia	(Russia) Alexander Samarin	(Canada) Nicolas Nadeau	(United States) Tomoki Hiwatashi	Details
(Spain) JGP Final	(United States) Nathan Chen	(Russia) Dmitri Aliev	(Japan) Sota Yamamoto	Details

Challenger Series
Competition	Gold	Silver	Bronze	Results
(United States) U.S. International Classic	(Israel) Daniel Samohin	(Japan) Keiji Tanaka	(United States) Ross Miner	Details
(Germany) Nebelhorn Trophy	(Canada) Elladj Baldé	(United States) Max Aaron	(Russia) Konstantin Menshov	Details
(Slovakia) Ondrej Nepela Trophy	(United States) Jason Brown	(Russia) Mikhail Kolyada	(Russia) Gordei Gorshkov	Details
(Finland) Finlandia Trophy	(Russia) Konstantin Menshov	(United States) Adam Rippon	(Russia) Sergei Voronov	Details
(Russia) Mordovian Ornament	(Russia) Maxim Kovtun	(Israel) Daniel Samohin	(Russia) Moris Kvitelashvili	Details
(Bulgaria) Denkova-Staviski Cup	(Uzbekistan) Misha Ge	(Malaysia) Julian Zhi Jie Yee	(Italy) Matteo Rizzo	Details
(Austria) Ice Challenge	(Russia) Artur Dmitriev, Jr.	(United States) Jason Brown	(Russia) Mikhail Kolyada	Details
(Estonia) Tallinn Trophy	(United States) Max Aaron	(Russia) Dmitri Aliev	(Latvia) Deniss Vasiļjevs	Details
(Poland) Warsaw Cup	(Russia) Alexander Samarin	(Russia) Anton Shulepov	(Russia) Zhan Bush	Details
(Croatia) Golden Spin of Zagreb	(Kazakhstan) Denis Ten	(United States) Adam Rippon	(Russia) Adian Pitkeev	Details

Other international competitions
Competition	Gold	Silver	Bronze	Results
(Thailand) Asian Open Trophy	(Philippines) Michael Christian Martinez	(Japan) Keiji Tanaka	(Japan) Hiroaki Sato	Details
(Italy) Lombardia Trophy	(France) Chafik Besseghier	(Czech Republic) Michal Březina	(France) Kevin Aymoz	Details
(Belarus) Ice Star	(South Korea) Kim Jin-seo	(Russia) Evgeni Vlasov	(Azerbaijan) Larry Loupolover	Details
(Canada) Autumn Classic International	(Japan) Yuzuru Hanyu	(Canada) Nam Nguyen	(United States) Sean Rabbitt	Details
(France) International Cup of Nice	(France) Chafik Besseghier	(Sweden) Alexander Majorov	(Russia) Dmitri Aliev	Details
Crystal Skate of Romania	(Finland) Tomi Pulkkinen	(Romania) Dorjan Kecskes	No other competitors	Details
(Latvia) Volvo Open Cup	(Russia) Artur Dmitriev, Jr.	(Sweden) Alexander Majorov	(Germany) Martin Rappe	Details
(Italy) Merano Cup	(Russia) Konstantin Menshov	(Italy) Matteo Rizzo	(Czech Republic) Jiri Belohradsky	Details
(Croatia) Golden Bear of Zagreb	(Finland) Matthias Versluis	(United Kingdom) Peter James Hallam	(Slovenia) David Kranjec	Details
Open d'Andorra	(Spain) Javier Raya	(Spain) Felipe Montoya	(Finland) Viktor Zubik	Details
(Germany) NRW Trophy	(Belgium) Jorik Hendrickx	(Kazakhstan) Denis Ten	(Russia) Sergei Voronov	Details
(Hungary) Santa Claus Cup	(Spain) Felipe Montoya	(Austria) Mario-Rafael Ionian	(Azerbaijan) Larry Loupolover	Details
(Poland) Mentor Toruń Cup	(Israel) Oleksii Bychenko	(Armenia) Slavik Hayrapetyan	(Azerbaijan) Larry Loupolover	Details
(Serbia) Skate Helena	(Finland) Tomi Pulkkinen	(Finland) Roman Galay	(Turkey) Burak Demirboga	Details
(United Arab Emirates) FBMA Trophy	(Sweden) Ondrej Spiegl	(Chinese Taipei) Chih-I Tsao	No other competitors	Details
(Slovenia) Dragon Trophy	(Finland) Roman Galay	(Slovenia) David Kranjec	(Italy) Alessandro Fadini	Details
(Bosnia and Herzegovina) Sarajevo Open	(Russia) Artur Dmitriev	(Russia) Alexander Petrov	(Switzerland) Nicola Todeschini	Details
(Bulgaria) Sofia Trophy	(Armenia) Slavik Hayrapetyan	(Finland) Matthias Versluis	(Belarus) Alexei Mialionkhin	Details
(Norway) Winter Youth Olympics	(Japan) Sota Yamamoto	(Latvia) Deniss Vasiļjevs	(Russia) Dmitri Aliev	Details
(Germany) Bavarian Open	(Italy) Ivan Righini	(Germany) Franz Streubel	(Japan) Ryuju Hino	Details
(Austria) Hellmut Seibt Memorial	(Russia) Mikhail Kolyada	(Czech Republic) Michal Brezina	(Germany) Alexander Bjelde	Details
(Denmark) Nordic Championships	(Sweden) Alexander Majorov	(Finland) Valtter Virtanen	(Australia) Brendan Kerry	Details
(Hungary) Sportland Trophy	(Canada) Kevin Reynolds	(Russia) Alexander Petrov	(Switzerland) Stéphane Walker	Details
(Austria) Cup of Tyrol	(France) Chafik Besseghier	(Italy) Maurizio Zandron	(Finland) Valtter Virtanen	Details
(Luxembourg) Coupe du Printemps	(Belgium) Jorik Hendrickx	(Kazakhstan) Denis Ten	(Japan) Takahito Mura	Details
(Slovenia) Triglav Trophy	(Canada) Liam Firus	(Italy) Maurizio Zandron	(United Kingdom) Charlie Parry-Evans	Details
(Hungary) Avas Cup	(Estonia) Samuel Koppel	(Chinese Taipei) Meng-Ju Lee	(Italy) Thibaut Bianchi	Details
(Italy) Gardena Spring Trophy	(Australia) Brendan Kerry	(Canada) Kevin Reynolds	(Switzerland) Stéphane Walker	

=== Ladies' singles ===
Championships
Competition	Gold	Silver	Bronze	Results
(Slovakia) European Championships	(Russia) Evgenia Medvedeva	(Russia) Elena Radionova	(Russia) Anna Pogorilaya	Details
(Taiwan) Four Continents Championships	(Japan) Satoko Miyahara	(United States) Mirai Nagasu	(Japan) Rika Hongo	Details
(Hungary) World Junior Championships	(Japan) Marin Honda	(Russia) Maria Sotskova	(Japan) Wakaba Higuchi	Details
(United States) World Championships	(Russia) Evgenia Medvedeva	(United States) Ashley Wagner	(Russia) Anna Pogorilaya	Details

Grand Prix
Competition	Gold	Silver	Bronze	Results
(United States) Skate America	(Russia) Evgenia Medvedeva	(United States) Gracie Gold	(Japan) Satoko Miyahara	Details
Skate Canada International	(United States) Ashley Wagner	(Russia) Elizaveta Tuktamysheva	(Japan) Yuka Nagai	Details
Cup of China	(Japan) Mao Asada	(Japan) Rika Hongo	(Russia) Elena Radionova	Details
(France) Trophée Éric Bompard	(United States) Gracie Gold	(Russia) Yulia Lipnitskaya	(Italy) Roberta Rodeghiero	Details
(Russia) Rostelecom Cup	(Russia) Elena Radionova	(Russia) Evgenia Medvedeva	(Russia) Adelina Sotnikova	Details
(Japan) NHK Trophy	(Japan) Satoko Miyahara	(United States) Courtney Hicks	(Japan) Mao Asada	Details
(Spain) Grand Prix Final	(Russia) Evgenia Medvedeva	(Japan) Satoko Miyahara	(Russia) Elena Radionova	Details

Junior Grand Prix
Competition	Gold	Silver	Bronze	Results
JGP Slovakia	(Russia) Polina Tsurskaya	(Japan) Mai Mihara	(United States) Vivian Le	Details
JGP Latvia	(Russia) Maria Sotskova	(Japan) Kaori Sakamoto	(South Korea) Choi Da-bin	Details
JGP United States	(Japan) Yuna Shiraiwa	(Japan) Marin Honda	(United States) Vivian Le	Details
JGP Austria	(Russia) Maria Sotskova	(Japan) Mai Mihara	(South Korea) Choi Da-bin	Details
JGP Poland	(Russia) Polina Tsurskaya	(Russia) Ekaterina Mitrofanova	(Japan) Rin Nitaya	Details
JGP Spain	(Japan) Yuna Shiraiwa	(Russia) Alisa Fedichkina	(Japan) Yura Matsuda	Details
JGP Croatia	(Japan) Marin Honda	(Japan) Wakaba Higuchi	(Russia) Diana Pervushkina	Details
(Spain) JGP Final	(Russia) Polina Tsurskaya	(Russia) Maria Sotskova	(Japan) Marin Honda	Details

Challenger Series
Competition	Gold	Silver	Bronze	Results
(United States) U.S. International Classic	(Japan) Satoko Miyahara	(Kazakhstan) Elizabet Tursynbayeva	(United States) Angela Wang	Details
(Germany) Nebelhorn Trophy	(Canada) Kaetlyn Osmond	(Russia) Alena Leonova	(United States) Courtney Hicks	Details
(Slovakia) Ondrej Nepela Trophy	(Russia) Evgenia Medvedeva	(Russia) Anna Pogorilaya	(Russia) Maria Artemieva	Details
(Finland) Finlandia Trophy	(Japan) Rika Hongo	(Russia) Yulia Lipnitskaya	(Sweden) Joshi Helgesson	Details
(Russia) Mordovian Ornament	(Russia) Anna Pogorilaya	(Russia) Adelina Sotnikova	(Russia) Maria Artemieva	Details
(Bulgaria) Denkova-Staviski Cup	(Sweden) Isabelle Olsson	(Latvia) Angelīna Kučvaļska	(Norway) Anne Line Gjersem	Details
(Austria) Ice Challenge	(United States) Mirai Nagasu	(Russia) Maria Artemieva	(United States) Tyler Pierce	Details
(Estonia) Tallinn Trophy	(Russia) Maria Sotskova	(Kazakhstan) Elizabet Tursynbayeva	(United States) Tyler Pierce	Details
(Poland) Warsaw Cup	(Russia) Elizaveta Tuktamysheva	(Russia) Serafima Sakhanovich	(Armenia) Anastasia Galustyan	Details
(Croatia) Golden Spin of Zagreb	(Russia) Elizaveta Tuktamysheva	(Kazakhstan) Elizabet Tursynbayeva	(United States) Karen Chen	Details

Other international competitions
Competition	Gold	Silver	Bronze	Results
(Thailand) Asian Open Trophy	(Japan) Mai Mihara	(Japan) Riona Kato	(Japan) Kaori Sakamoto	Details
(Italy) Lombardia Trophy	(Italy) Roberta Rodeghiero	(Sweden) Joshi Helgesson	(Japan) Miyu Nakashio	Details
(Belarus) Ice Star	(South Korea) Kim Sena	(Lithuania) Aleksandra Golovkina	(Estonia) Johanna Allik	Details
(Canada) Autumn Classic International	(Kazakhstan) Elizabet Tursynbayeva	(Japan) Haruka Imai	(United States) Angela Wang	Details
(France) International Cup of Nice	(Russia) Elizaveta Tuktamysheva	(Russia) Alena Leonova	(France) Laurine Lecavelier	Details
Crystal Skate of Romania	(South Korea) Kim Tae-kyung	(United Kingdom) Frances Howell	(United Kingdom) Michelle Callison	Details
(Latvia) Volvo Open Cup	(Sweden) Matilda Algotsson	(Austria) Kerstin Frank	(South Korea) Byun Ji-hyun	Details
(Italy) Merano Cup	(Russia) Alena Leonova	(Italy) Giada Russo	(Czech Republic) Elizaveta Ukolova	Details
(Croatia) Golden Bear of Zagreb	(Sweden) Linnea Mellgren	(Austria) Lara Roth	(Italy) Carol Bressanutti	Details
Open d'Andorra	(Spain) Sonia Lafuente	(South Africa) Michaela Du Toit	(Australia) Chantelle Kerry	Details
(Germany) NRW Trophy	(France) Laurine Lecavelier	(Czech Republic) Elizaveta Ukolova	(Czech Republic) Anna Dušková	Details
(Hungary) Santa Claus Cup	(Czech Republic) Eliška Březinová	(Hungary) Ivett Tóth	(Luxembourg) Fleur Maxwell	Details
(Poland) Mentor Toruń Cup	(Latvia) Angelīna Kučvaļska	(Armenia) Anastasia Galustyan	(Chinese Taipei) Amy Lin	Details
(Serbia) Skate Helena	(Hungary) Fruzsina Medgyesi	(Finland) Liubov Efimenko	(Turkey) Sıla Saygı	Details
(Iceland) Reykjavik International Games	(Norway) Camilla Gjersem	(Hong Kong) Maisy Hiu Ching Ma	(South Africa) Michaela Du Toit	Details
(United Arab Emirates) FBMA Trophy	(South Korea) Youn Ha-rim	(Germany) Nicole Schott	(Thailand) Thita Lamsam	Details
(Slovenia) Dragon Trophy	(Slovenia) Daša Grm	(Italy) Ilaria Nogaro	(Austria) Lara Roth	Details
(Bosnia and Herzegovina) Sarajevo Open	(Russia) Elizaveta Tuktamysheva	(France) Nadjma Mahamoud	(Bosnia and Herzegovina) Arijana Tirak	Details
(Bulgaria) Sofia Trophy	(Sweden) Joshi Helgesson	(Estonia) Johanna Allik	(Italy) Giada Russo	Details
(Hungary) Jégvirág Cup	(United Kingdom) Kristen Spours	(Austria) Lara Roth	(Hungary) Julia Batori	Details
(Norway) Winter Youth Olympics	(Russia) Polina Tsurskaya	(Russia) Maria Sotskova	(Kazakhstan) Elizabet Tursynbayeva	Details
(Germany) Bavarian Open	(Japan) Yuka Nagai	(Germany) Lutricia Bock	(Germany) Lea Johanna Dastich	Details
(Austria) Hellmut Seibt Memorial	(Germany) Lutricia Bock	(Hungary) Ivett Tóth	(Slovenia) Daša Grm	Details
(Denmark) Nordic Championships	(Sweden) Joshi Helgesson	(Finland) Viveca Lindfors	(Sweden) Isabelle Olsson	Details
(Hungary) Sportland Trophy	(Italy) Roberta Rodeghiero	(Brazil) Isadora Williams	(Switzerland) Yasmine Kimiko Yamada	Details
(Austria) Cup of Tyrol	(Russia) Julia Lipnitskaya	(France) Laurine Lecavelier	(Sweden) Isabelle Olsson	Details
(Luxembourg) Coupe du Printemps	(Sweden) Joshi Helgesson	(Japan) Rin Nitaya	(Italy) Giada Russo	Details
(Slovenia) Triglav Trophy	(Japan) Mariko Kihara	(Italy) Ilaria Nogaro	(Italy) Alessia Zardini	Details
(Hungary) Avas Cup	(Finland) Liubov Efimenko	(Austria) Belinda Schönberger	(Finland) Vilma Lehtinen	Details
(Italy) Gardena Spring Trophy	(Italy) Giada Russo	(Italy) Micol Cristini	(Austria) Kerstin Frank	

=== Pairs ===
Championships
Competition	Gold	Silver	Bronze	Results
(Slovakia) European Championships	(Russia) Tatiana Volosozhar / Maxim Trankov	(Germany) Aliona Savchenko / Bruno Massot	(Russia) Evgenia Tarasova / Vladimir Morozov	Details
(Taiwan) Four Continents Championships	(China) Sui Wenjing / Han Cong	(United States) Alexa Scimeca / Chris Knierim	(China) Yu Xiaoyu / Jin Yang	Details
(Hungary) World Junior Championships	(Czech Republic) Anna Dušková / Martin Bidař	(Russia) Anastasia Mishina / Vladislav Mirzoev	(Russia) Ekaterina Borisova / Dmitry Sopot	Details
(United States) World Championships	(Canada) Meagan Duhamel / Eric Radford	(China) Sui Wenjing / Han Cong	(Germany) Aliona Savchenko / Bruno Massot	Details

Grand Prix
Competition	Gold	Silver	Bronze	Results
(United States) Skate America	(China) Sui Wenjing / Han Cong	(United States) Alexa Scimeca / Chris Knierim	(Canada) Julianne Séguin / Charlie Bilodeau	Details
Skate Canada International	(Canada) Meagan Duhamel / Eric Radford	(Russia) Evgenia Tarasova / Vladimir Morozov	(Canada) Kirsten Moore-Towers / Michael Marinaro	Details
Cup of China	(Russia) Yuko Kavaguti / Alexander Smirnov	(China) Sui Wenjing / Han Cong	(China) Yu Xiaoyu / Jin Yang	Details
(France) Trophée Éric Bompard	(Russia) Tatiana Volosozhar / Maxim Trankov	(France) Vanessa James / Morgan Ciprès	(Canada) Julianne Séguin / Charlie Bilodeau	Details
(Russia) Rostelecom Cup	(Russia) Ksenia Stolbova / Fedor Klimov	(Russia) Yuko Kavaguti / Alexander Smirnov	(China) Peng Cheng / Zhang Hao	Details
(Japan) NHK Trophy	(Canada) Meagan Duhamel / Eric Radford	(China) Yu Xiaoyu / Jin Yang	(United States) Alexa Scimeca / Chris Knierim	Details
(Spain) Grand Prix Final	(Russia) Ksenia Stolbova / Fedor Klimov	(Canada) Meagan Duhamel / Eric Radford	(Russia) Yuko Kavaguti / Alexander Smirnov	Details

Junior Grand Prix
Competition	Gold	Silver	Bronze	Results
JGP Latvia	(Ukraine) Renata Oganesian / Mark Bardei	(Russia) Anastasia Poluianova / Stepan Korotkov	(Russia) Ekaterina Borisova / Dmitry Sopot	Details
JGP United States	(Russia) Anastasia Gubanova / Alexei Sintsov	(United States) Joy Weinberg / Maximiliano Fernandez	(Russia) Elena Ivanova / Tagir Khakimov	Details
JGP Austria	(Russia) Amina Atakhanova / Ilia Spiridonov	(Czech Republic) Anna Dušková / Martin Bidař	(Ukraine) Renata Oganesian / Mark Bardei	Details
JGP Poland	(Russia) Ekaterina Borisova / Dmitry Sopot	(Russia) Amina Atakhanova / Ilia Spiridonov	(Russia) Anastasia Gubanova / Alexei Sintsov	Details
(Spain) JGP Final	(Russia) Ekaterina Borisova / Dmitry Sopot	(Czech Republic) Anna Dušková / Martin Bidař	(Russia) Amina Atakhanova / Ilia Spiridonov	Details

Challenger Series
Competition	Gold	Silver	Bronze	Results
(United States) U.S. International Classic	(United States) Tarah Kayne / Daniel O'Shea	(United States) Marissa Castelli / Mervin Tran	(Canada) Kirsten Moore-Towers / Michael Marinaro	Details
(Germany) Nebelhorn Trophy	(Russia) Tatiana Volosozhar / Maxim Trankov	(United States) Alexa Scimeca / Chris Knierim	(France) Vanessa James / Morgan Ciprès	Details
(Slovakia) Ondrej Nepela Trophy	(Russia) Ksenia Stolbova / Fedor Klimov	(Russia) Kristina Astakhova / Alexei Rogonov	(Russia) Evgenia Tarasova / Vladimir Morozov	Details
(Russia) Mordovian Ornament	(Russia) Yuko Kavaguti / Alexander Smirnov	(Russia) Natalja Zabijako / Alexander Enbert	(Lithuania) Goda Butkutė / Nikita Ermolaev	Details
(Austria) Ice Challenge	(United States) Alexa Scimeca / Chris Knierim	(Germany) Mari Vartmann / Ruben Blommaert	(Italy) Nicole Della Monica / Matteo Guarise	Details
(Estonia) Tallinn Trophy	(Germany) Aliona Savchenko / Bruno Massot	(Germany) Mari Vartmann / Ruben Blommaert	(United Kingdom) Amani Fancy / Christopher Boyadji	Details
(Poland) Warsaw Cup	(Germany) Aliona Savchenko / Bruno Massot	(Italy) Nicole Della Monica / Matteo Guarise	(Lithuania) Goda Butkutė / Nikita Ermolaev	Details
(Croatia) Golden Spin of Zagreb	(Russia) Evgenia Tarasova / Vladimir Morozov	(Russia) Kristina Astakhova / Alexei Rogonov	(United States) Tarah Kayne / Daniel O'Shea	Details

Other international competitions
Competition	Gold	Silver	Bronze	Results
(Italy) Lombardia Trophy	(Italy) Valentina Marchei / Ondřej Hotárek	(Lithuania) Goda Butkutė / Nikita Ermolaev	(France) Camille Mendoza / Pavel Kovalev	Details
(Canada) Autumn Classic International	(Canada) Meagan Duhamel / Eric Radford	(United States) Marissa Castelli / Mervin Tran	(United States) Jessica Pfund / Joshua Santillan	Details
(France) International Cup of Nice	(Germany) Mari Vartmann / Ruben Blommaert	(Austria) Miriam Ziegler / Severin Kiefer	(France) Camille Mendoza / Pavel Kovalev	Details
(Germany) NRW Trophy	(Germany) Minerva Hase / Nolan Seegert	No other competitors		Details
(Poland) Mentor Toruń Cup	(Japan) Sumire Suto / Francis Boudreau-Audet	(Lithuania) Goda Butkute / Nikita Ermolaev	(France) Lola Esbrat / Andrei Novoselov	Details
(Bosnia and Herzegovina) Sarajevo Open	(Russia) Alexandra Shevchenko / Ivan Bich	(Germany) Minerva-Fabienne Hase / Nolan Seegert	(Turkey) Çağla Demirsal / Berk Akalın	Details
(Norway) Winter Youth Olympics	(Russia) Ekaterina Borisova / Dmitry Sopot	(Czech Republic) Anna Dušková / Martin Bidař	(Russia) Alina Ustimkina / Nikita Volodin	Details
(Germany) Bavarian Open	(Germany) Aliona Savchenko / Bruno Massot	(Germany) Minerva-Fabienne Hase / Nolan Seegert	(France) Lola Esbrat / Andrei Novoselov	Details
(Austria) Hellmut Seibt Memorial	(Italy) Valentina Marchei / Ondrej Hotarek	(Russia) Alisa Efimova / Alexander Korovin	(Switzerland) Ioulia Chtchetinina / Noah Scherer	Details
(Austria) Cup of Tyrol	(Russia) Vera Bazarova / Andrei Deputat	(France) Vanessa James / Morgan Cipres	(North Korea) Ryom Tae Ok / Kim Ju Sik	Details

=== Ice dance ===
Championships
Competition	Gold	Silver	Bronze	Results
(Slovakia) European Championships	(France) Gabriella Papadakis / Guillaume Cizeron	(Italy) Anna Cappellini / Luca Lanotte	(Russia) Ekaterina Bobrova / Dmitri Soloviev	Details
(Taiwan) Four Continents Championships	(United States) Maia Shibutani / Alex Shibutani	(United States) Madison Chock / Evan Bates	(Canada) Kaitlyn Weaver / Andrew Poje	Details
(Hungary) World Junior Championships	(United States) Lorraine McNamara / Quinn Carpenter	(United States) Rachel Parsons / Michael Parsons	(Russia) Alla Loboda / Pavel Drozd	Details
(United States) World Championships	(France) Gabriella Papadakis / Guillaume Cizeron	(United States) Maia Shibutani / Alex Shibutani	(United States) Madison Chock / Evan Bates	Details

Grand Prix
Competition	Gold	Silver	Bronze	Results
(United States) Skate America	(United States) Madison Chock / Evan Bates	(Russia) Victoria Sinitsina / Nikita Katsalapov	(Canada) Piper Gilles / Paul Poirier	Details
Skate Canada International	(Canada) Kaitlyn Weaver / Andrew Poje	(United States) Maia Shibutani / Alex Shibutani	(Russia) Ekaterina Bobrova / Dmitri Soloviev	Details
Cup of China	(Italy) Anna Cappellini / Luca Lanotte	(United States) Madison Chock / Evan Bates	(Russia) Elena Ilinykh / Ruslan Zhiganshin	Details
(France) Trophée Éric Bompard	(United States) Madison Hubbell / Zachary Donohue	(Canada) Piper Gilles / Paul Poirier	(Russia) Alexandra Stepanova / Ivan Bukin	Details
(Russia) Rostelecom Cup	(Canada) Kaitlyn Weaver / Andrew Poje	(Italy) Anna Cappellini / Luca Lanotte	(Russia) Victoria Sinitsina / Nikita Katsalapov	Details
(Japan) NHK Trophy	(United States) Maia Shibutani / Alex Shibutani	(Russia) Ekaterina Bobrova / Dmitri Soloviev	(United States) Madison Hubbell / Zachary Donohue	Details
(Spain) Grand Prix Final	(Canada) Kaitlyn Weaver / Andrew Poje	(United States) Madison Chock / Evan Bates	(Italy) Anna Cappellini / Luca Lanotte	Details

Junior Grand Prix
Competition	Gold	Silver	Bronze	Results
JGP Slovakia	(United States) Rachel Parsons / Michael Parsons	(Russia) Alla Loboda / Pavel Drozd	(Russia) Sofia Shevchenko / Igor Eremenko	Details
JGP Latvia	(Russia) Betina Popova / Yuri Vlasenko	(France) Angélique Abachkina / Louis Thauron	(Russia) Sofia Evdokimova / Egor Bazin	Details
JGP United States	(United States) Lorraine McNamara / Quinn Carpenter	(Canada) Mackenzie Bent / Dmitre Razgulajevs	(Russia) Sofia Polishchuk / Alexander Vakhnov	Details
JGP Austria	(Russia) Alla Loboda / Pavel Drozd	(France) Marie-Jade Lauriault / Romain Le Gac	(United States) Julia Biechler / Damian Dodge	Details
JGP Poland	(United States) Lorraine McNamara / Quinn Carpenter	(United States) Christina Carreira / Anthony Ponomarenko	(Russia) Anastasia Skoptsova / Kirill Aleshin	Details
JGP Spain	(France) Marie-Jade Lauriault / Romain Le Gac	(Russia) Betina Popova / Yuri Vlasenko	(United States) Elliana Pogrebinsky / Alex Benoit	Details
JGP Croatia	(United States) Rachel Parsons / Michael Parsons	(Russia) Anastasia Skoptsova / Kirill Aleshin	(Russia) Sofia Shevchenko / Igor Eremenko	Details
(Spain) JGP Final	(United States) Lorraine McNamara / Quinn Carpenter	(Russia) Alla Loboda / Pavel Drozd	(United States) Rachel Parsons / Michael Parsons	Details

Challenger Series
Competition	Gold	Silver	Bronze	Results
(United States) U.S. International Classic	(United States) Madison Hubbell / Zachary Donohue	(Denmark) Laurence Fournier Beaudry / Nikolaj Sørensen	(Canada) Élisabeth Paradis / François-Xavier Ouellette	Details
(Germany) Nebelhorn Trophy	(United States) Madison Chock / Evan Bates	(Canada) Alexandra Paul / Mitchell Islam	(United States) Anastasia Cannuscio / Colin McManus	Details
(Slovakia) Ondrej Nepela Trophy	(Canada) Piper Gilles / Paul Poirier	(United Kingdom) Penny Coomes / Nicholas Buckland	(United States) Maia Shibutani / Alex Shibutani	Details
(Finland) Finlandia Trophy	(Canada) Kaitlyn Weaver / Andrew Poje	(Israel) Isabella Tobias / Ilia Tkachenko	(Denmark) Laurence Fournier Beaudry / Nikolaj Sørensen	Details
(Russia) Mordovian Ornament	(Russia) Elena Ilinykh / Ruslan Zhiganshin	(Israel) Isabella Tobias / Ilia Tkachenko	(Poland) Natalia Kaliszek / Maksym Spodyriev	Details
(Bulgaria) Denkova-Staviski Cup	(Turkey) Alisa Agafonova / Alper Uçar	(Belarus) Viktoria Kavaliova / Yurii Bieliaiev	(Russia) Ludmila Sosnitskaia / Pavel Golovishnikov	Details
(Austria) Ice Challenge	(United States) Danielle Thomas / Daniel Eaton	(Italy) Misato Komatsubara / Andrea Fabbri	(Finland) Olesia Karmi / Max Lindholm	Details
(Estonia) Tallinn Trophy	(Israel) Isabella Tobias / Ilia Tkachenko	(Slovakia) Federica Testa / Lukas Csolley	(Finland) Cecilia Törn / Jussiville Partanen	Details
(Poland) Warsaw Cup	(Italy) Charlène Guignard / Marco Fabbri	(Poland) Natalia Kaliszek / Maksym Spodyriev	(Finland) Cecilia Törn / Jussiville Partanen	Details
(Croatia) Golden Spin of Zagreb	(Italy) Charlène Guignard / Marco Fabbri	(United States) Kaitlin Hawayek / Jean-Luc Baker	(Armenia) Tina Garabedian / Simon Proulx-Sénécal	Details

Other international competitions
Competition	Gold	Silver	Bronze	Results
(United States) Lake Placid Ice Dance International	(Israel) Isabella Tobias / Ilia Tkachenko	(United States) Danielle Thomas / Daniel Eaton	(Canada) Carolane Soucisse / Simon Tanguay	
(Italy) Lombardia Trophy	(Italy) Anna Cappellini / Luca Lanotte	(Italy) Charlène Guignard / Marco Fabbri	(Italy) Misato Komatsubara / Andrea Fabbri	Details
(Belarus) Ice Star	(Russia) Ksenia Monko / Kirill Khaliavin	(Belarus) Viktoria Kavaliova / Yurii Bieliaiev	(South Korea) Rebeka Kim / Kirill Minov	Details
(Canada) Autumn Classic International	(Canada) Nicole Orford / Asher Hill	(Canada) Andréanne Poulin / Marc-André Servant	(United States) Karina Manta / Joseph Johnson	Details
(France) International Cup of Nice	(Finland) Cecilia Törn / Jussiville Partanen	(France) Lorenza Alessandrini / Pierre Souquet-Basiege	(Canada) Carolane Soucisse / Simon Tanguay	Details
(Latvia) Volvo Open Cup	(South Korea) Rebeka Kim / Kirill Minov	(Latvia) Olga Jakushina / Andrei Nevskiy	(Norway) Thea Rabe / Timothy Koleto	Details
(Germany) NRW Trophy	(Turkey) Alisa Agafonova / Alper Uçar	(Austria) Barbora Silna / Juri Kurakin	(Germany) Katharina Müller / Tim Dieck	Details
Open d'Andorra	(Germany) Kavita Lorenz / Panagiotis Polizoakis	(Poland) Natalia Kaliszek / Maksym Spodyriev	(Finland) Olesia Karmi / Max Lindholm	Details
(Czech Republic) Pavel Roman Memorial	(Czech Republic) Cortney Mansour / Michal Češka	(Lithuania) Taylor Tran / Saulius Ambrulevičius	No other competitors	Details
(Hungary) Santa Claus Cup	(Russia) Tiffany Zahorski / Jonathan Guerreiro	(Italy) Misato Komatsubara / Andrea Fabbri	(Ukraine) Valeria Haistruk / Oleksiy Oliynyk	Details
(Poland) Mentor Toruń Cup	(Poland) Natalia Kaliszek / Maksym Spodyriev	(Japan) Kana Muramoto / Chris Reed	(Germany) Katharina Müller / Tim Dieck	Details
(Norway) Winter Youth Olympics	(Russia) Anastasia Shpilevaya / Grigory Smirnov	(United States) Chloe Lewis / Logan Bye	(Russia) Anastasia Skoptsova / Kirill Aleshin	Details
(Germany) Bavarian Open	(United Kingdom) Penny Coomes / Nicholas Buckland	(Armenia) Tina Garabedian / Simon Proulx-Sénécal	(United Kingdom) Carter Marie Jones / Richard Sharpe	Details

== Season's best scores ==
=== Men's singles ===
Top 10 season's best scores in the men's combined total
No.	Skater	Nation	Score	Event
1	Yuzuru Hanyu	Japan	330.43	2015–16 Grand Prix Final
2	Javier Fernández	Spain	314.93	2016 World Championships
3	Patrick Chan	Canada	290.21	2016 Four Continents Championships
4	Jin Boyang	China	289.83	2016 Four Continents Championships
5	Shoma Uno	Japan	276.79	2015–16 Grand Prix Final
6	Denis Ten	Kazakhstan	276.39	2015 Golden Spin of Zagreb
7	Yan Han	China	271.55	2016 Four Continents Championships
8	Takahito Mura	Japan	268.43	2016 Four Continents Championships
9	Mikhail Kolyada	Russia	267.97	2016 World Championships
10	Adam Rippon	United States	264.44	2016 World Championships

Top 10 season's best scores in the men's short program
No.	Skater	Nation	Score	Event
1	Yuzuru Hanyu	Japan	110.95	2015–16 Grand Prix Final
2	Javier Fernández	Spain	102.54	2016 European Championships
3	Jin Boyang	China	98.45	2016 Four Continents Championships
4	Patrick Chan	Canada	94.84	2016 World Championships
5	Denis Ten	Kazakhstan	94.03	2015 Golden Spin of Zagreb
6	Shoma Uno	Japan	92.99	2016 Four Continents Championships
7	Mikhail Kolyada	Russia	89.66	2016 World Championships
8	Yan Han	China	89.57	2016 Four Continents Championships
9	Takahito Mura	Japan	89.08	2016 Four Continents Championships
10	Maxim Kovtun	Russia	88.09	2016 European Championships

Top 10 season's best scores in the men's free skating
No.	Skater	Nation	Score	Event
1	Yuzuru Hanyu	Japan	219.48	2015–16 Grand Prix Final
2	Javier Fernández	Spain	216.41	2016 World Championships
3	Patrick Chan	Canada	203.99	2016 Four Continents Championships
4	Jin Boyang	China	191.38	2016 Four Continents Championships
5	Shoma Uno	Japan	190.32	2015–16 Grand Prix Final
6	Denis Ten	Kazakhstan	182.36	2015 Golden Spin of Zagreb
7	Yan Han	China	181.98	2016 Four Continents Championships
8	Takahito Mura	Japan	179.35	2016 Four Continents Championships
9	Adam Rippon	United States	178.72	2015 Rostelecom Cup
10	Mikhail Kolyada	Russia	178.31	2016 World Championships

=== Ladies' singles ===
Top 10 season's best scores in the ladies' combined total
No.	Skater	Nation	Score	Event
1	Evgenia Medvedeva	Russia	223.86	2016 World Championships
2	Ashley Wagner	United States	215.39	2016 World Championships
3	Satoko Miyahara	Japan	214.91	2016 Four Continents Championships
4	Anna Pogorilaya	Russia	214.07	2015 Mordovian Ornament
5	Elena Radionova	Russia	211.32	2015 Rostelecom Cup
6	Gracie Gold	United States	211.29	2016 World Championships
7	Adelina Sotnikova	Russia	203.89	2015 Mordovian Ornament
8	Elizaveta Tuktamysheva	Russia	201.33	2015 Golden Spin of Zagreb
9	Mao Asada	Japan	200.30	2016 World Championships
10	Rika Hongo	Japan	199.15	2016 World Championships

Top 10 season's best scores in the ladies' short program
No.	Skater	Nation	Score	Event
1	Gracie Gold	United States	76.43	2016 World Championships
2	Adelina Sotnikova	Russia	75.57	2015 Mordovian Ornament
3	Evgenia Medvedeva	Russia	74.58	2015–16 Grand Prix Final
4	Anna Pogorilaya	Russia	73.98	2016 World Championships
5	Ashley Wagner	United States	73.16	2016 World Championships
6	Satoko Miyahara	Japan	72.48	2016 Four Continents Championships
7	Elena Radionova	Russia	71.79	2015 Rostelecom Cup
8	Mao Asada	Japan	71.73	2015 Cup of China
9	Rika Hongo	Japan	69.89	2016 World Championships
10	Elizaveta Tuktamysheva	Russia	69.48	2015 Golden Spin of Zagreb

Top 10 season's best scores in the ladies' free skating
No.	Skater	Nation	Score	Event
1	Evgenia Medvedeva	Russia	150.10	2016 World Championships
2	Satoko Miyahara	Japan	142.43	2016 Four Continents Championships
3	Ashley Wagner	United States	142.23	2016 World Championships
4	Anna Pogorilaya	Russia	141.81	2015 Mordovian Ornament
5	Elena Radionova	Russia	139.53	2015 Rostelecom Cup
6	Gracie Gold	United States	137.41	2015 Skate America
7	Mao Asada	Japan	134.43	2016 World Championships
8	Elizaveta Tuktamysheva	Russia	133.62	2015 Skate Canada International
9	Rika Hongo	Japan	129.97	2015 Cup of China
10	Polina Tsurskaya	Russia	128.59	2015–16 JGP Final

=== Pairs ===
Top 10 season's best scores in the pairs' combined total
No.	Team	Nation	Score	Event
1	Meagan Duhamel / Eric Radford	Canada	231.99	2016 World Championships
2	Ksenia Stolbova / Fedor Klimov	Russia	229.44	2015–16 Grand Prix Final
3	Sui Wenjing / Han Cong	China	224.47	2016 World Championships
4	Tatiana Volosozhar / Maxim Trankov	Russia	222.66	2016 European Championships
5	Aliona Savchenko / Bruno Massot	Germany	216.17	2016 World Championships
6	Yuko Kavaguti / Alexander Smirnov	Russia	216.00	2015 Cup of China
7	Alexa Scimeca / Chris Knierim	United States	207.96	2016 Four Continents Championships
8	Evgenia Tarasova / Vladimir Morozov	Russia	206.27	2016 World Championships
9	Julianne Séguin / Charlie Bilodeau	Canada	200.98	2015–16 Grand Prix Final
10	Liubov Ilyushechkina / Dylan Moscovitch	Canada	199.52	2016 World Championships

Top 10 season's best scores in the pairs' short program
No.	Team	Nation	Score	Event
1	Sui Wenjing / Han Cong	China	80.85	2016 World Championships
2	Tatiana Volosozhar / Maxim Trankov	Russia	79.77	2016 European Championships
3	Meagan Duhamel / Eric Radford	Canada	78.18	2016 World Championships
4	Aliona Savchenko / Bruno Massot	Germany	76.30	2015 Warsaw Cup
5	Yuko Kavaguti / Alexander Smirnov	Russia	76.02	2015 Mordovian Ornament
6	Ksenia Stolbova / Fedor Klimov	Russia	75.45	2015 Rostelecom Cup
7	Evgenia Tarasova / Vladimir Morozov	Russia	73.06	2015 Golden Spin of Zagreb
8	Alexa Scimeca / Chris Knierim	United States	71.37	2016 World Championships
9	Julianne Séguin / Charlie Bilodeau	Canada	71.16	2015–16 Grand Prix Final
10	Yu Xiaoyu / Jin Yang	China	70.06	2015 Cup of China

Top 10 season's best scores in the pairs' free skating
No.	Team	Nation	Score	Event
1	Ksenia Stolbova / Fedor Klimov	Russia	154.60	2015–16 Grand Prix Final
2	Meagan Duhamel / Eric Radford	Canada	153.81	2016 World Championships
3	Sui Wenjing / Han Cong	China	143.62	2016 World Championships
4	Yuko Kavaguti / Alexander Smirnov	Russia	143.55	2015 Cup of China
5	Aliona Savchenko / Bruno Massot	Germany	142.98	2015 Tallinn Trophy
6	Tatiana Volosozhar / Maxim Trankov	Russia	142.89	2016 European Championships
7	Alexa Scimeca / Chris Knierim	United States	140.35	2016 Four Continents Championships
8	Evgenia Tarasova / Vladimir Morozov	Russia	134.27	2016 World Championships
9	Liubov Ilyushechkina / Dylan Moscovitch	Canada	131.35	2016 World Championships
10	Julianne Séguin / Charlie Bilodeau	Canada	129.82	2015–16 Grand Prix Final

=== Ice dance ===
Top 10 season's best scores in the combined total (ice dance)
No.	Team	Nation	Score	Event
1	Gabriella Papadakis / Guillaume Cizeron	France	194.46	2016 World Championships
2	Maia Shibutani / Alex Shibutani	United States	188.43	2016 World Championships
3	Madison Chock / Evan Bates	United States	185.77	2016 World Championships
4	Anna Cappellini / Luca Lanotte	Italy	182.72	2016 World Championships
5	Kaitlyn Weaver / Andrew Poje	Canada	182.66	2015–16 Grand Prix Final
6	Madison Hubbell / Zachary Donohue	United States	176.81	2016 World Championships
7	Elena Ilinykh / Ruslan Zhiganshin	Russia	176.70	2015 Mordovian Ornament
8	Ekaterina Bobrova / Dmitri Soloviev	Russia	176.50	2016 European Championships
9	Penny Coomes / Nicholas Buckland	Great Britain	173.17	2016 World Championships
10	Piper Gilles / Paul Poirier	Canada	173.07	2016 World Championships

Top 10 season's best scores in the short dance
No.	Team	Nation	Score	Event
1	Gabriella Papadakis / Guillaume Cizeron	France	76.29	2016 World Championships
2	Maia Shibutani / Alex Shibutani	United States	74.70	2016 World Championships
3	Kaitlyn Weaver / Andrew Poje	Canada	72.75	2015–16 Grand Prix Final
4	Madison Chock / Evan Bates	United States	72.46	2016 World Championships
5	Anna Cappellini / Luca Lanotte	Italy	72.31	2016 European Championships
6	Piper Gilles / Paul Poirier	Canada	70.70	2016 World Championships
7	Elena Ilinykh / Ruslan Zhiganshin	Russia	70.12	2015 Mordovian Ornament
8	Madison Hubbell / Zachary Donohue	United States	69.36	2016 Four Continents Championships
9	Ekaterina Bobrova / Dmitri Soloviev	Russia	68.71	2016 European Championships
10	Victoria Sinitsina / Nikita Katsalapov	Russia	68.33	2016 European Championships

Top 10 season's best scores in the free dance
No.	Team	Nation	Score	Event
1	Gabriella Papadakis / Guillaume Cizeron	France	118.17	2016 World Championships
2	Maia Shibutani / Alex Shibutani	United States	113.73	2016 World Championships
3	Madison Chock / Evan Bates	United States	113.31	2016 World Championships
4	Anna Cappellini / Luca Lanotte	Italy	112.07	2016 World Championships
5	Kaitlyn Weaver / Andrew Poje	Canada	110.18	2016 World Championships
6	Madison Hubbell / Zachary Donohue	United States	108.37	2016 World Championships
7	Ekaterina Bobrova / Dmitri Soloviev	Russia	107.79	2016 European Championships
8	Elena Ilinykh / Ruslan Zhiganshin	Russia	106.58	2015 Mordovian Ornament
9	Penny Coomes / Nicholas Buckland	Great Britain	104.94	2016 World Championships
10	Victoria Sinitsina / Nikita Katsalapov	Russia	104.32	2016 European Championships

== World standings ==
=== Men's singles ===
As of April 2, 2016

No.	Skater	Nation
1	Yuzuru Hanyu	Japan
2	Javier Fernandez	Spain
3	Denis Ten	Kazakhstan
4	Sergei Voronov	Russia
5	Shoma Uno	Japan
6	Maxim Kovtun	Russia
7	Jason Brown	United States
8	Patrick Chan	Canada
9	Takahito Mura	Japan
10	Adam Rippon	United States

=== Ladies' singles ===
As of April 3, 2016

No.	Skater	Nation
1	Satoko Miyahara	Japan
2	Elizaveta Tuktamysheva	Russia
3	Elena Radionova	Russia
4	Ashley Wagner	United States
5	Anna Pogorilaya	Russia
6	Gracie Gold	United States
7	Evgenia Medvedeva	Russia
8	Rika Hongo	Japan
9	Yulia Lipnitskaya	Russia
10	Mao Asada	Japan

=== Pairs ===
As of April 2, 2016

No.	Team	Nation
1	Meagan Duhamel / Eric Radford	Canada
2	Ksenia Stolbova / Fedor Klimov	Russia
3	Wenjing Sui / Cong Han	China
4	Alexa Scimeca / Chris Knierim	United States
5	Evgenia Tarasova / Vladimir Morozov	Russia
6	Yuko Kavaguti / Alexander Smirnov	Russia
7	Tatiana Volosozhar / Maxim Trankov	Russia
8	Cheng Peng / Hao Zhang	China
9	Vanessa James / Morgan Cipres	France
10	Xiaoyu Yu / Yang Jin	China

=== Ice dance ===
As of April 1, 2016

No.	Team	Nation
1	Madison Chock / Evan Bates	United States
2	Kaitlyn Weaver / Andrew Poje	Canada
3	Maia Shibutani / Alex Shibutani	United States
4	Gabriella Papadakis / Guillaume Cizeron	France
5	Anna Cappellini / Luca Lanotte	Italy
6	Madison Hubbell / Zachary Donohue	United States
7	Piper Gilles / Paul Poirier	Canada
8	Penny Coomes / Nicholas Buckland	Great Britain
9	Charlene Guignard / Marco Fabbri	Italy
10	Ekaterina Bobrova / Dmitri Soloviev	Russia

== Current season's world rankings ==
=== Men's singles ===
As of April 2, 2016

No.	Skater	Nation
1	Yuzuru Hanyu	Japan
2	Javier Fernandez	Spain
3	Shoma Uno	Japan
4	Boyang Jin	China
5	Adam Rippon	United States
6	Patrick Chan	Canada
7	Max Aaron	United States
8	Mikhail Kolyada	Russia
9	Daniel Samohin	Israel
10	Michal Brezina	Czech Republic

=== Ladies' singles ===
As of April 3, 2016

No.	Skater	Nation
1	Evgenia Medvedeva	Russia
2	Satoko Miyahara	Japan
3	Ashley Wagner	United States
4	Anna Pogorilaya	Russia
5	Elena Radionova	Russia
6	Gracie Gold	United States
7	Rika Hongo	Japan
8	Roberta Rodeghiero	Italy
9	Mirai Nagasu	United States
10	Mao Asada	Japan

=== Pairs ===
As of April 2, 2016

No.	Team	Nation
1	Ksenia Stolbova / Fedor Klimov	Russia
2	Meagan Duhamel / Eric Radford	Canada
3	Alexa Scimeca / Chris Knierim	United States
4	Evgenia Tarasova / Vladimir Morozov	Russia
5	Wenjing Sui / Cong Han	China
6	Tarah Kayne / Danny O'Shea	United States
7	Vanessa James / Morgan Cipres	France
8	Aliona Savchenko / Bruno Massot	Germany
9	Xiaoyu Yu / Yang Jin	China
10	Tatiana Volosozhar / Maxim Trankov	Russia

=== Ice dance ===
As of April 1, 2016

No.	Team	Nation
1	Madison Chock / Evan Bates	United States
2	Maia Shibutani / Alex Shibutani	United States
3	Kaitlyn Weaver / Andrew Poje	Canada
4	Anna Cappellini / Luca Lanotte	Italy
5	Madison Hubbell / Zachary Donohue	United States
6	Penny Coomes / Nicholas Buckland	Great Britain
7	Charlene Guignard / Marco Fabbri	Italy
8	Ekaterina Bobrova / Dmitri Soloviev	Russia
9	Piper Gilles / Paul Poirier	Canada
10	Laurence Fournier Beaudry / Nikolaj Sorensen	Denmark
