= 2015 CS Ice Challenge =

Figure skating competition

2015 Ice Challenge
- Type: ISU Challenger Series
- Date: 27 – 31 October 2015
- Season: 2015–16
- Location: Graz, Austria
- Host: Skate Austria
- Venue: Liebenauer Eishalle

Champions
- Men's singles: (Russia) Artur Dmitriev, Jr.
- Ladies' singles: (United States) Mirai Nagasu
- Pairs: (United States) Alexa Scimeca / Chris Knierim
- Ice dance: (United States) Danielle Thomas / Daniel Eaton
- Previous: 2014 Ice Challenge
- Next: 2016 Ice Challenge

The 2015 Ice Challenge was a senior international figure skating competition held in late October 2015 at the Liebenauer Eishalle in Graz, Austria. It was part of the 2015–16 ISU Challenger Series. Medals were awarded in the disciplines of men's singles, ladies' singles, pair skating, and ice dancing.

== Entries ==
The preliminary entries were published on 6 October 2015.

Country	Men	Ladies	Pairs	Ice dance
Armenia				Tina Garabedian / Simon Proulx-Sénécal
Australia		Kailani Craine		
Austria	Mario-Rafael Ionian; Simon-Gabriel Ionian; Manuel Koll	Christina Grill; Ines Wohlmuth; Nina Larissa Wolfslast		Barbora Silná / Juri Kurakin
Belgium	Jorik Hendrickx	Loena Hendrickx		
Bosnia and Herzegovina		Arijana Tirak		
Czech Republic	Jiří Bělohradský; Petr Kotlařík	Anna Dušková; Elizaveta Ukolova		
Estonia		Gerli Liinamäe		
Finland	Viktor Zubik	Nelma Hede; Emilia Toikkanen		Olesia Karmi / Max Lindholm
Germany	Anton Kempf	Lutricia Bock; Nathalie Weinzierl	Mari Vartmann / Ruben Blommaert	
Hungary		Fruzsina Medgyesi; Ivett Tóth		
Israel		Aimee Buchanan		
Italy	Adrien Bannister; Alessandro Fadini	Sara Casella; Sara Falotico	Nicole Della Monica / Matteo Guarise	Misato Komatsubara / Andrea Fabbri; Jasmine Tessari / Francesco Fioretti
Lithuania		Inga Janulevičiūtė		
North Korea			Ryom Tae-ok / Kim Ju-sik	
Norway		Camilla Gjersem		
Russia	Artur Dmitriev, Jr. Mikhail Kolyada; Anton Shulepov	Maria Artemieva; Serafima Sakhanovich		
Slovenia		Daša Grm		
South Korea				Yura Min / Alexander Gamelin
Switzerland	Stéphane Walker	Matilde Gianocca		
United Kingdom	Phillip Harris			
United States	Jason Brown; Jordan Moeller	Mirai Nagasu; Tyler Pierce	Jessica Calalang / Zack Sidhu; Alexa Scimeca / Chris Knierim	Danielle Thomas / Daniel Eaton

== Results: Challenger Series ==
=== Medal summary ===
Discipline	Gold	Silver	Bronze
Men	(Russia) Artur Dmitriev, Jr.	(United States) Jason Brown	(Russia) Mikhail Kolyada
Ladies	(United States) Mirai Nagasu	(Russia) Maria Artemieva	(United States) Tyler Pierce
Pairs	(United States) Alexa Scimeca / Chris Knierim	(Germany) Mari Vartmann / Ruben Blommaert	(Italy) Nicole Della Monica / Matteo Guarise
Ice dancing	(United States) Danielle Thomas / Daniel Eaton	(Italy) Misato Komatsubara / Andrea Fabbri	(Finland) Olesia Karmi / Max Lindholm

=== Men ===
Rank	Name	Nation	Total	SP		FS	
1	Artur Dmitriev, Jr.	Russia	247.57	2	84.46	2	163.11
2	Jason Brown	United States	240.65	1	85.29	4	155.36
3	Mikhail Kolyada	Russia	239.77	3	74.86	1	164.91
4	Jorik Hendrickx	Belgium	233.47	4	74.55	3	158.92
5	Anton Shulepov	Russia	215.01	5	74.16	5	140.85
6	Phillip Harris	United Kingdom	183.33	6	65.93	6	117.40
7	Jordan Moeller	United States	178.21	7	63.50	9	114.71
8	Stéphane Walker	Switzerland	175.44	8	60.39	8	115.05
9	Jiří Bělohradský	Czech Republic	167.55	9	54.71	10	112.84
10	Anton Kempf	Germany	163.69	12	47.28	7	116.41
11	Adrien Bannister	Italy	153.42	10	53.41	11	100.01
12	Mario-Rafael Ionian	Austria	137.12	14	43.77	12	93.35
13	Viktor Zubik	Finland	134.54	13	44.69	13	89.85
14	Alessandro Fadini	Italy	131.10	11	47.83	14	83.27
15	Manuel Koll	Austria	113.09	15	37.11	15	75.98
16	Simon-Gabriel Ionian	Austria	95.71	16	29.98	16	65.73
WD	Petr Kotlařík	Czech Republic					

=== Ladies ===
Rank	Name	Nation	Total	SP		FS	
1	Mirai Nagasu	United States	169.38	2	57.85	1	111.53
2	Maria Artemieva	Russia	166.81	3	57.49	2	109.32
3	Tyler Pierce	United States	162.69	1	58.47	3	104.22
4	Serafima Sakhanovich	Russia	157.73	5	54.39	4	103.34
5	Ivett Tóth	Hungary	150.15	4	54.89	5	95.26
6	Anna Dušková	Czech Republic	142.23	6	53.83	9	88.40
7	Kailani Craine	Australia	141.59	8	49.70	6	91.89
8	Lutricia Bock	Germany	141.07	7	50.14	7	90.93
9	Daša Grm	Slovenia	134.35	12	44.94	8	89.41
10	Nathalie Weinzierl	Germany	128.49	9	47.73	11	80.76
11	Aimee Buchanan	Israel	122.83	11	45.07	13	77.76
12	Sara Casella	Italy	120.75	19	38.49	10	82.26
13	Elizaveta Ukolova	Czech Republic	118.65	13	42.62	15	76.03
14	Fruzsina Medgyesi	Hungary	118.47	10	47.32	17	71.15
15	Emilia Toikkanen	Finland	115.15	16	40.58	16	74.57
16	Camilla Gjersem	Norway	114.71	21	36.55	12	78.16
17	Inga Janulevičiūtė	Lithuania	112.55	22	35.23	14	77.32
18	Gerli Liinamäe	Estonia	109.17	17	40.45	18	68.72
19	Matilde Gianocca	Switzerland	106.02	20	37.69	19	68.33
20	Sara Falotico	Italy	104.72	15	40.84	20	63.88
21	Nelma Hede	Finland	103.65	14	42.10	21	61.55
22	Nina Larissa Wolfslast	Austria	92.42	23	31.40	22	61.02
23	Christina Grill	Austria	85.43	24	27.94	23	57.49
24	Ines Wohlmuth	Austria	76.62	25	22.11	24	54.51
25	Arijana Tirak	Bosnia and Herzegovina	45.47	26	15.54	25	29.93
WD	Loena Hendrickx	Belgium		18	39.92		

=== Pairs ===
Rank	Name	Nation	Total	SP		FS	
1	Alexa Scimeca / Chris Knierim	United States	189.28	1	68.74	1	120.54
2	Mari Vartmann / Ruben Blommaert	Germany	155.62	3	56.38	2	99.24
3	Nicole Della Monica / Matteo Guarise	Italy	154.78	2	58.34	4	96.44
4	Jessica Calalang / Zack Sidhu	United States	150.96	4	52.58	3	98.38
5	Ryom Tae-ok / Kim Ju-sik	North Korea	132.18	5	44.16	5	88.02

=== Ice dancing ===
Rank	Name	Nation	Total	SD		FD	
1	Danielle Thomas / Daniel Eaton	United States	132.44	1	52.34	1	80.10
2	Misato Komatsubara / Andrea Fabbri	Italy	126.66	2	51.76	3	74.90
3	Olesia Karmi / Max Lindholm	Finland	124.26	4	49.32	2	74.94
4	Barbora Silná / Juri Kurakin	Austria	123.60	3	51.08	4	72.52
5	Yura Min / Alexander Gamelin	South Korea	107.76	6	40.48	5	67.28
6	Tina Garabedian / Simon Proulx-Sénécal	Armenia	102.54	7	39.90	6	62.64
7	Jasmine Tessari / Francesco Fioretti	Italy	97.16	5	41.12	7	56.04

== Results: Leo Scheu Memorial ==
=== Medal summary: Junior ===
Discipline	Gold	Silver	Bronze
Men	Petr Gumennik	Daniel Grassl	Catalin Dimitrescu
Ladies	Stanislava Konstantinova	Maria Perederova	Kristina Isaev
