= Anton Shulepov =

Russian figure skater

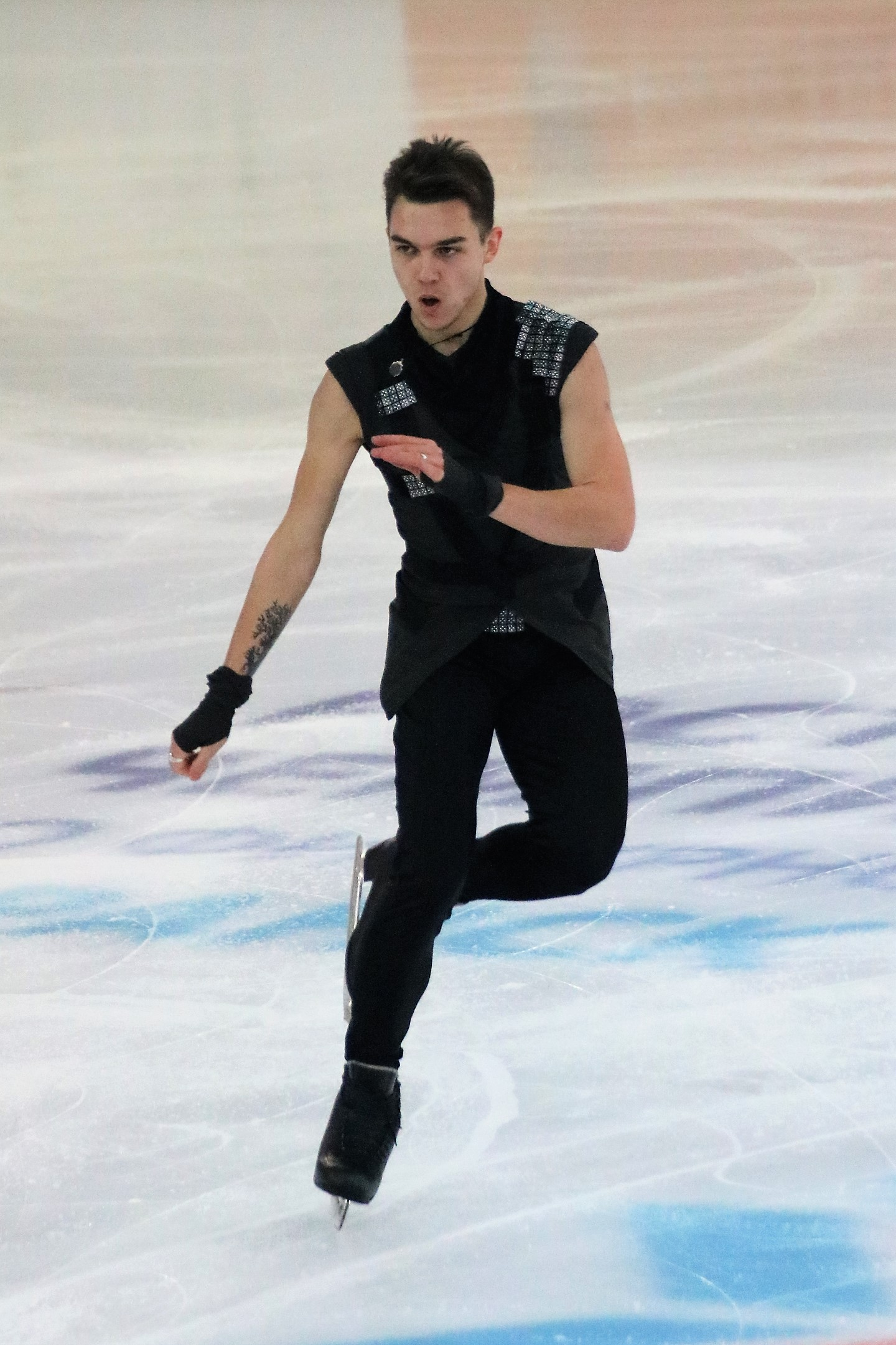

Personal information
- Native name: Антон Анатольевич Шулепов
- Full name: Anton Anatolyevich Shulepov
- Born: 30 March 1996 (age 30) Vladimir, Vladimir Oblast, Russia

Figure skating career
- Country: Russia
- Coach: Evgeni Rukavicin
- Skating club: Olympic School St. Petersburg

Anton Anatolyevich Shulepov (Russian: Антон Анатольевич Шулепов, born 30 March 1996) is a Russian figure skater. He has won three international medals – silver at the 2015 CS Warsaw Cup, 2016 CS Tallinn Trophy, and 2016 International Cup of Nice.

== Career ==
Shulepov trained in Vladimir Oblast until 2013 when he moved to Saint Petersburg, becoming a student of Evgeni Rukavicin. He ranked seventh at the 2015 Russian Championships.

=== 2015–2016 season ===
In the 2015–16 season, Shulepov placed 5th at the 2015 CS Ice Challenge. Later in the season he won his first ISU Challenger Series medal when he was a silver medalist at the 2015 CS Warsaw Cup. He was in the lead after the short program but eventually lost the gold medal to Alexander Samarin by 1.75 points. He finished 11th at the 2016 Russian Championships.

=== 2016–2017 season ===
In October Shulepov won the silver medal at the International Cup of Nice. In November he won another silver medal, now at the 2016 CS Tallinn Trophy. In December he placed eighth at the 2016 CS Golden Spin of Zagreb. He finished ninth at the 2017 Russian Championships.

=== 2017–2018 season ===
In October Shulepov placed ninth at the 2017 CS Minsk-Arena Ice Star. In December he finished ninth at the 2018 Russian Championships.

=== 2018–2019 season ===
In late November Shulepov competed at the 2018 CS Tallinn Trophy where he won the bronze medal with a personal best score of 230.30 points. One week later he finished seventh at the 2018 CS Golden Spin of Zagreb. At the 2019 Russian Championships, he finished tenth.

=== 2019–2020 season ===
Shulepov placed eleventh out of eleven skaters at the 2019 Internationaux de France. His choice of costume, half Holocaust victim and half Nazi guard, raised some eyebrows.

== Competitive highlights ==
CS: Challenger Series

International
Event	13–14	14–15	15–16	16–17	17–18	18–19	19–20	20–21
GP France							11th	
GP NHK Trophy							8th	
CS Golden Spin				8th		7th		
CS Ice Challenge			5th					
CS Ice Star					9th			
CS Tallinn Trophy				2nd		3rd		
CS Warsaw Cup			2nd					
Cup of Nice				2nd				
Gardena		4th						
NRW Trophy	9th							
Universiade				14th				
National
Russia		7th	11th	9th	9th	10th	8th	6th
Russia, Junior	14th							
Russian Cup Final	10th J	2nd	4th	9th	1st	3rd	2nd	
TBD = Assigned; WD = Withdrew

== Detailed results ==
Small medals for short and free programs awarded only at ISU Championships.

2020–21 season
Date	Event	SP	FS	Total
23–27 December 2020	2021 Russian Championships	9; 83.19	4; 166.70	6; 249.89
2019–20 season
Date	Event	SP	FS	Total
24–29 December 2019	2020 Russian Championships	6; 81.17	7; 156.59	8; 237.76
22–24 November 2019	2019 NHK Trophy	9; 71.76	7; 146.62	8; 218.38
1–3 November 2019	2019 Internationaux de France	11; 63.67	11; 120.31	11; 183.98
2018–19 season
Date	Event	SP	FS	Total
18–22 February 2019	2019 Russian Cup Final domestic competition	7; 73.05	1; 158.40	3; 231.45
19–23 December 2018	2019 Russian Championships	7; 77.07	12; 129.89	10; 206.96
5–8 December 2018	2018 CS Golden Spin of Zagreb	7; 78.52	5; 147.30	7; 225.82
26 November – 2 December 2018	2018 CS Tallinn Trophy	2; 80.86	3; 149.44	3; 230.30
2017–18 season
Date	Event	SP	FS	Total
21–24 December 2017	2018 Russian Championships	13; 69.99	6; 151.14	9; 221.13
26–29 October 2017	2017 CS Minsk-Arena Ice Star	8; 68.84	6; 135.69	9; 204.53
2016–17 season
Date	Event	SP	FS	Total
1–5 February 2017	2017 Winter Universiade	7; 76.13	15; 124.51	14; 200.64
20–26 December 2016	2017 Russian Championships	6; 78.11	9; 145.92	9; 224.03
7–10 December 2016	2016 CS Golden Spin of Zagreb	10; 67.55	3; 148.04	8; 215.59
20–27 November 2016	2016 CS Tallinn Trophy	1; 75.66	3; 133.38	2; 209.04
22–24 September 2016	2016 Cup of Nice	5; 64.63	2; 144.91	2; 209.54
2015–16 season
Date	Event	SP	FS	Total
23–27 December 2015	2016 Russian Championships	10; 75.86	10; 146.08	11; 221.94
27–29 November 2015	2015 CS Warsaw Cup	1; 78.64	3; 144.88	2; 223.52
27–31 October 2015	2015 CS Ice Challenge	5; 74.16	5; 140.85	5; 215.01
2014–15 season
Date	Event	SP	FS	Total
23–25 March 2015	2015 Gardena Spring Trophy	4; 63.07	3; 116.98	4; 180.05
24–28 December 2014	2015 Russian Championships	11; 66.48	6; 141.86	7; 208.34
2013–14 season
Date	Event	SP	FS	Total
22–25 January 2014	2014 Russian Junior Championships	8; 61.65	16; 100.82	14; 162.47
4–8 December 2013	2013 NRW Trophy	11; 57.26	10; 104.47	9; 161.73

== Personal life ==
In April 2019, Shulepov married figure skater Alena Leonova.
