= 2015 CS Finlandia Trophy =

Figure skating competition

2015 Finlandia Trophy
- Type: ISU Challenger Series
- Date: October 9 – 11
- Season: 2015–16
- Location: Espoo
- Host: Finnish Figure Skating Association
- Venue: Barona Arena

Champions
- Men's singles: (Russia) Konstantin Menshov
- Ladies' singles: (Japan) Rika Hongo
- Ice dance: (Canada) Kaitlyn Weaver / Andrew Poje
- Synchronized skating: (Finland) Rockettes
- Previous: 2014 CS Finlandia Trophy
- Next: 2016 CS Finlandia Trophy

The 2015 Finlandia Trophy was a senior international figure skating competition in the 2015–16 season. A part of the 2015–16 ISU Challenger Series, the 20th edition of the annual event was held on October 9–11, 2015 at the Barona Areena in Espoo. October 8 was an unofficial practice day. Medals were awarded in the disciplines of men's singles, ladies' singles, ice dancing, and synchronized skating.

== Entries ==
The entries as of October 8, 2015 were:

Country	Men	Ladies	Ice dancing	Synchronized skating
Austria			Barbora Silná / Juri Kurakin	
Bulgaria	Iassen Petkov			
Canada	Liam Firus		Brianna Delmaestro / Timothy Lum; Kaitlyn Weaver / Andrew Poje	
Czech Republic	Michal Březina	Eliška Březinová	Cortney Mansour / Michal Češka	
Denmark			Laurence Fournier Beaudry / Nikolaj Sørensen	
Finland	Roman Galay; Matthias Versluis; Valtter Virtanen; Viktor Zubik	Anni Järvenpää; Viveca Lindfors; Emmi Peltonen; Juulia Turkkila	Olesia Karmi / Max Lindholm; Cecilia Törn / Jussiville Partanen	Marigold IceUnity; Revolutions; Rockettes; Team Unique
Germany	Alexander Bjelde	Lutricia Bock	Jennifer Urban / Sevan Lerche	
United Kingdom	Graham Newberry	Kristen Spours	Carter Marie Jones / Richard Sharpe	
Israel			Isabella Tobias / Ilia Tkachenko	
Italy		Ilaria Nogaro; Guia Maria Tagliapietra		
Japan	Ryuju Hino	Rika Hongo		
South Korea	Lee June-hyoung	Park So-youn		
Norway		Anne Line Gjersem; Camilla Gjersem		
Philippines	Michael Christian Martinez			
Russia	Konstantin Menshov; Sergei Voronov	Yulia Lipnitskaya		Paradise
Switzerland		Tanja Odermatt		
Sweden	Alexander Majorov	Joshi Helgesson		
United States	Timothy Dolensky; Adam Rippon	Hannah Miller	Kaitlin Hawayek / Jean-Luc Baker	

=== Changes to preliminary assignments ===
- On October 8, 2015, Elena Radionova withdrew from the event due to health problems. She was not replaced.
- On October 8, 2015, Sara Hurtado / Adrià Díaz withdrew from the event due to Hurtado having an injured ankle. They were not replaced.

== Results ==
=== Men ===
Rank	Name	Nation	Total points	SP		FS	
1	Konstantin Menshov	Russia	230.10	2	76.71	2	153.39
2	Adam Rippon	United States	224.18	3	69.29	1	154.89
3	Sergei Voronov	Russia	213.34	1	79.06	7	134.28
4	Timothy Dolensky	United States	210.55	6	66.52	3	144.03
5	Michal Březina	Czech Republic	205.06	5	67.48	4	137.58
6	Ryuju Hino	Japan	203.42	4	67.55	6	135.87
7	Liam Firus	Canada	200.27	9	64.10	5	136.17
8	Alexander Majorov	Sweden	198.72	8	64.59	8	134.13
9	Michael Christian Martinez	Philippines	190.57	7	65.18	9	125.36
10	Lee June-hyoung	South Korea	172.97	11	57.07	10	115.90
11	Matthias Versluis	Finland	163.02	10	60.32	11	102.70
12	Valtter Virtanen	Finland	154.60	14	52.82	12	101.78
13	Roman Galay	Finland	140.98	15	47.55	13	93.43
14	Viktor Zubik	Finland	139.75	13	53.62	14	86.13
15	Alexander Bjelde	Germany	134.70	12	53.71	15	80.99
—	Graham Newberry	United Kingdom	withdrew	16	42.26	withdrew from competition	
—	Iassen Petkov	Bulgaria	withdrew	withdrew from competition			

=== Ladies ===
Rank	Name	Nation	Total points	SP		FS	
1	Rika Hongo	Japan	187.45	1	65.75	1	121.70
2	Yulia Lipnitskaya	Russia	172.33	2	62.81	2	109.52
3	Joshi Helgesson	Sweden	164.28	3	56.69	4	107.59
4	Park So-youn	South Korea	159.93	6	51.51	3	108.42
5	Viveca Lindfors	Finland	151.12	7	51.14	5	99.98
6	Hannah Miller	United States	150.13	4	54.49	6	95.64
7	Lutricia Bock	Germany	140.39	5	53.45	11	86.94
8	Anne Line Gjersem	Norway	134.29	9	46.69	10	87.60
9	Tanja Odermatt	Switzerland	133.65	12	44.48	9	89.17
10	Emmi Peltonen	Finland	131.24	13	39.60	7	91.64
11	Anni Järvenpää	Finland	130.34	10	46.56	12	83.78
12	Juulia Turkkila	Finland	128.67	8	47.05	14	81.62
13	Camilla Gjersem	Norway	128.05	11	45.92	13	82.13
14	Eliška Březinová	Czech Republic	126.59	16	37.03	8	89.56
15	Kristen Spours	United Kingdom	116.62	15	37.53	15	79.09
16	Ilaria Nogaro	Italy	105.47	14	38.25	16	67.32

=== Ice dancing ===
Rank	Name	Nation	Total points	SD		FD	
1	Kaitlyn Weaver / Andrew Poje	Canada	161.67	1	65.13	1	96.54
2	Isabella Tobias / Ilia Tkachenko	Israel	150.89	2	60.04	3	90.85
3	Laurence Fournier Beaudry / Nikolaj Sørensen	Denmark	147.65	3	56.79	2	90.86
4	Kaitlin Hawayek / Jean-Luc Baker	United States	132.86	4	55.60	7	77.26
5	Cecilia Törn / Jussiville Partanen	Finland	131.08	5	49.54	4	81.54
6	Cortney Mansour / Michal Češka	Czech Republic	127.31	7	48.03	6	79.28
7	Brianna Delmaestro / Timothy Lum	Canada	127.12	9	47.58	5	79.54
8	Olesia Karmi / Max Lindholm	Finland	117.75	6	48.78	8	68.97
9	Barbora Silná / Juri Kurakin	Austria	114.55	8	47.70	9	66.85
10	Carter Marie Jones / Richard Sharpe	United Kingdom	111.48	10	45.61	10	65.87
11	Jennifer Urban / Sevan Lerche	Germany	97.47	11	41.27	11	56.20

=== Synchronized skating ===
Rank	Name	Nation	Total (SP)
1	Rockettes	Finland	68.93
2	Paradise	Russia	65.97
3	Marigold IceUnity	Finland	64.34
4	Team Unique	Finland	57.12
5	Revolutions	Finland	55.46
