= Maria Artemieva =

Russian figure skater

Maria Artemyeva
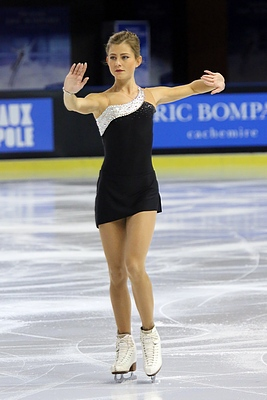

Personal information
- Native name: Мария Эдуардовна Артемьева
- Full name: Maria Eduardovna Artemyeva
- Born: 11 March 1993 (age 33) Saint Petersburg, Russia
- Height: 1.66 m (5 ft 5 1/2 in)

Figure skating career
- Country: Russia
- Coach: Evgeni Rukavicin
- Skating club: Figure Skating Academy St. Petersburg
- Retired: 2016
Medal record
Representing Russia
Figure skating: Ladies' singles
Winter Universiade
Bronze medal – third place	2015 Granada	Ladies' singles

Maria Eduardovna Artemyeva (Russian: Мария Эдуардовна Артемьева; born 11 March 1993) is a Russian former competitive figure skater. She is the 2013 Cup of Nice champion, 2015 Winter Universiade bronze medalist, and winner of four ISU Challenger Series medals.

== Personal life ==
Maria Eduardovna Artemyeva was born 11 March 1993 in Saint Petersburg, Russia.

== Career ==
=== 2008 to 2013 ===
In the 2008–09 season, Artemyeva made her junior international debut, taking the bronze medal at Cup of Nice, and competed on the senior level at the Russian Championships, finishing 10th. The following season, she placed 4th at the 2009 Junior Grand Prix in Zagreb, Croatia — the first and only JGP assignment of her career — and won the junior silver medal at Cup of Nice.

Making her senior international debut, Artemyeva placed 14th at the 2010 Golden Spin of Zagreb. After placing 12th at the 2011 Russian Championships, she was sent to her first Winter Universiade, where she finished 11th. Her first senior international medal, bronze, came at the 2011 Golden Spin of Zagreb and her first win at the 2013 International Cup of Nice.

=== 2014–15 season ===
Artemyeva placed sixth in her ISU Challenger Series (CS) debut, at the Finlandia Trophy in October 2014. In November, making her Grand Prix (GP) debut, she placed 10th at the 2014 Rostelecom Cup and then 6th at the 2014 Trophée Éric Bompard. In December, she was awarded her first CS medal, silver, at the 2014 Golden Spin of Zagreb, having finished second to Finland's Kiira Korpi. Artemieva was 8th at the 2015 Russian Championships and ended her season with a bronze medal at the 2015 Winter Universiade, behind Alena Leonova and Maé-Bérénice Méité.

=== 2015–16 to present ===
Beginning the 2015–16 season on the CS series, Artemyeva obtained bronze medals at the 2015 Ondrej Nepela Trophy and 2015 Mordovian Ornament and silver at the 2015 Ice Challenge. She finished 11th at her GP assignment, the 2015 NHK Trophy.

The following season, she was invited to the 2016 Skate Canada International but withdrew in September.

== Programs ==
Season	Short program	Free skating
2016–17	Nocturne in E minor, Op. posth. 72 by Frédéric Chopin	The Easy Virtue Tango (from Easy Virtue) by Marius de Vries
2015–16	At Last performed by Etta James choreo. by Olga Glinka	24 Preludes, Op. 28, Molto Agitato by Frédéric Chopin performed by Ivan Moravec; Revolutionary Étude by Frédéric Chopin performed by Vladimir Ashkenazy; Nocturne in C-sharp minor by Frédéric Chopin performed by Maria João Pires choreo. by Olga Glinka, Konstantin Menshov
2014–15	Tango (from Coco Channel) by Andrea Guerra; Eye by Coba choreo. by Olga Glinka	24 Preludes, Op. 28, Molto Agitato by Frédéric Chopin performed by Ivan Moravec; Revolutionary Étude by Frédéric Chopin performed by Vladimir Ashkenazy; Nocturne in C-sharp minor by Frédéric Chopin performed by Maria João Pires choreo. by Olga Glinka, Konstantin Menshov
2013–14	Maestro (from The Holiday) by Hans Zimmer	Die Another Day by David Arnold

== Competitive highlights ==
GP: Grand Prix; CS: Challenger Series; JGP: Junior Grand Prix

International
Event	08–09	09–10	10–11	11–12	13–14	14–15	15–16	16–17
GP Bompard						6th		
GP NHK Trophy							11th	
GP Rostelecom Cup						10th		
GP Skate Canada								WD
CS Finlandia						6th		
CS Golden Spin						2nd		
CS Ice Challenge							2nd	
CS Mordovian							3rd	
CS Ondrej Nepela							3rd	
Winter Universiade			11th		7th	3rd		
Cup of Nice					1st			
Gardena Trophy				4th				
Golden Spin			14th	3rd				
Merano Cup							5th	
International: Junior
JGP Croatia		4th						
Cup of Nice	3rd J	2nd J						
National
Russian Champ.	10th	12th	12th	13th	11th	8th	12th	
J = Junior level; WD = Withdrew
