= Tyler Pierce =

American figure skater

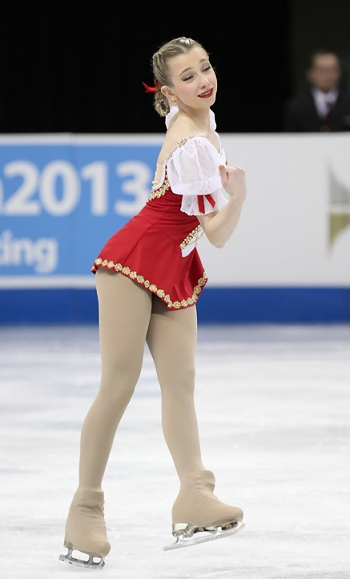
- Pierce in 2013

Personal information
- Born: October 12, 1998 (age 28) Whittier, California, U.S.
- Home town: Norco, California, U.S.
- Height: 5 ft 2 in (1.58 m)

Figure skating career
- Country: United States
- Coach: Tammy Gambill
- Skating club: All Year FSC Ontario
- Began skating: 2007

Tyler Pierce (born October 12, 1998) is an American former figure skater. She has won two medals on the ISU Challenger Series – bronze at the 2015 Ice Challenge and 2015 Tallinn Trophy. She is the 2014 U.S. national junior silver medalist.

== Personal life ==
Pierce was born on October 12, 1998, in Whittier, California. The daughter of Sharon and Larry Pierce, she trained in gymnastics until the age of nine and has expressed interest in a career as a chef.

== Career ==
Pierce won gold on the novice level at the 2013 U.S. Championships.

At the start of the 2013–14 season, Pierce was sent to the ISU Junior Grand Prix in Estonia and finished 6th. After winning the junior silver medal at the 2014 U.S. Championships, she was named in the U.S. team to the 2014 World Junior Championships in Sofia, Bulgaria. She finished 14th overall after placing 10th in the short program and 14th in the free skate.

Pierce placed 7th competing on the senior level at the 2015 U.S. Championships and was selected to compete at the 2015 World Junior Championships in Tallinn, Estonia. Ranked 19th in the short and 22nd in the free, she finished 19th overall.

Making her senior international debut, Pierce placed fourth at the 2015 Skate Canada Autumn Classic before winning bronze medals at a pair of ISU Challenger Series (CS) events, the 2015 Ice Challenge and 2015 Tallinn Trophy. After placing fifth in senior ladies' at the 2016 U.S. Championships, she competed at the 2016 World Junior Championships in Debrecen, Hungary; she placed 7th in the short, 6th in the free, and 6th overall.

Pierce was invited to a Grand Prix event, the 2016 Trophée de France, but withdrew due to a lumbar sprain.

== Programs ==
Season	Short program	Free skating	Exhibition
2015–2016	Voices from the Forest by Paul Spaeth choreo. by Cindy Stuart	Danse macabre by Camille Saint-Saëns choreo. by Cindy Stuart; Concierto de Aranjuez by Joaquín Rodrigo choreo. by Rohene Ward	I Want to Hold Your Hand performed by T. V. Carpio
2014–2015	Voices from the Forest by Paul Spaeth choreo. by Cindy Stuart	Pas de Deux (from The Nutcracker) by Pyotr Ilyich Tchaikovsky choreo. by Rohene Ward; Dance of the Hours (from La Gioconda) by Amilcare Ponchielli choreo. by Mark Pillay	
2013–2014	Voices from the Forest by Paul Spaeth choreo. by Cindy Stuart	Danse macabre by Camille Saint-Saëns choreo. by Cindy Stuart	
2012–2013	Puss in Boots by Henry Jackman	Korobushka by Bond	

== Competitive highlights ==
GP: Grand Prix; CS: Challenger Series; JGP: Junior Grand Prix

International
Event	13–14	14–15	15–16	16–17
GP Trophée de France				WD
CS Ice Challenge			3rd	
CS Tallinn Trophy			3rd	
Autumn Classic			4th	
International: Junior
Junior Worlds	14th	19th	6th	
JGP Estonia	6th			
Bavarian Open			1st J	
National
U.S. Champ.	2nd J	7th	5th	
