= Olesia Karmi =

Finnish former ice dancer (born 1992)

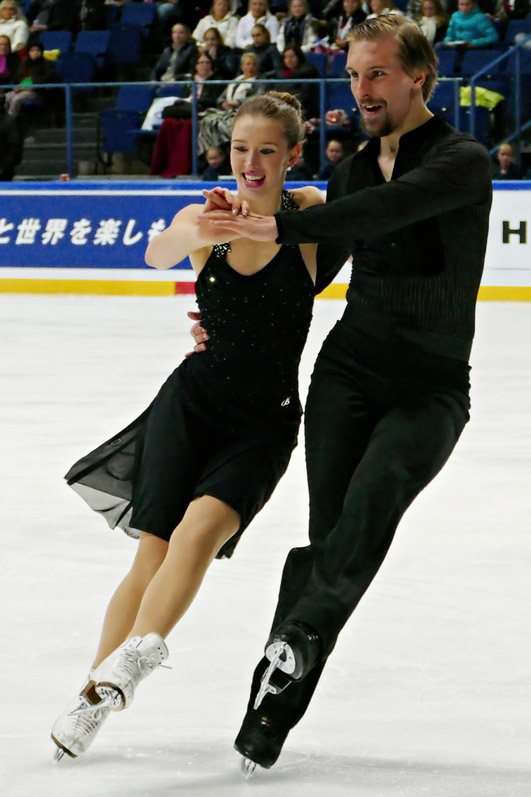
- Karmi and Lindholm at the 2015 Finlandia Trophy

Personal information
- Born: 23 May 1992 (age 34) Saint Petersburg, Russia
- Home town: Helsinki, Finland
- Height: 1.70 m (5 ft 7 in)

Figure skating career
- Country: Finland
- Partner: Max Lindholm
- Coach: Elena Sokolova
- Skating club: Arctic Edge FSC
- Began skating: 1999

Olesia Karmi (born 23 May 1992) is a Finnish former ice dancer. With partner Max Lindholm, she is the 2015 CS Ice Challenge bronze medalist, 2014 NRW Trophy bronze medalist, and a two-time (2013 and 2015) Finnish national champion. The duo reached the free skate at two ISU Championships – 2013 Europeans in Zagreb and 2015 Europeans in Stockholm. They were 22nd at the 2013 World Championships in London, Ontario.

Karmi and Lindholm ended their partnership in February 2016. They reconsidered a few months later and on 20 April 2016 announced that they would continue competing together.

== Programs ==
(with Lindholm)

Season	Short dance	Free dance
2016–17	Blues; Jive	Maybe I, Maybe You by the Scorpions
2015–16	Waltz No. 2 by Dmitri Shostakovich; Ping Champagne by Rauno Lehtinen	Where's the Man; The Good Life; Teddy the Sweeper by Timo Lassy
2014–15	España cañí by Pascual Marquina Narro; Malaguena by Ernesto Lecuona	Libertango by Astor Piazzolla
2013–14	Man With the Hex; Maddest Kind of Love; Mr. Pinstripe Suit	Finlandia Op. 26; Valse Triste Op. 44; Symphony No. 2 Allegro Moderato by Jean Sibelius
2012–13	Säkkijärven Polka; Kesäillan Valssi	Titanic by James Horner; Southampton; My Gal Sal; Party in the 3rd Class; My Heart Will Go On
2011–12	Mira pa dentro by Carlos Jean and Amaparanoia; Quando Pienso En Ti by Jose Feliciano; Swing Da Cor by Daniela Mercury	Angelica by Hans Zimmer, Rodrigo y Gabriela; Mermaids; South of Heaven's Chanting Mermaids; On Stranger Tides by Hans Zimmer
2010–11	Autumn in Paris; Burnt by the Sun by Jerzy Petersburski	Caruso by Lucio Dalla; Angelina by Il Divo

== Competitive highlights ==
with Lindholm

CS: Challenger Series; JGP: Junior Grand Prix

International
Event	09–10	10–11	11–12	12–13	13–14	14–15	15–16	16–17
Worlds				22nd				
Europeans				19th		19th		
CS Finlandia						6th	8th	10th
CS Golden Spin						6th	5th	
CS Ice Challenge							3rd	
Bavarian Open			8th	7th	8th	7th		
Cup of Nice				6th	7th			
Finlandia Trophy			8th	9th	9th			
Ice Challenge					5th			
Nebelhorn Trophy			13th					
NRW Trophy			8th			3rd		8th
Pavel Roman			6th	12th				
Toruń Cup					5th			
Volvo Open Cup					15th			
International: Junior
Junior Worlds		12th P						
JGP U.K.		14th						
NRW Trophy		11th J						
National
Finnish Champ.	1st J	1st J	2nd	1st	3rd	1st	2nd	
J = Junior level; P = Preliminary round
