= Ice Challenge =

International figure skating competition

- Genre: International competition
- Frequency: Annual
- Venue: Eisstadion Liebenau
- Location: Graz
- Country: Austria
- Inaugurated: 2009
- Previous event: 2025
- Next event: 2026
- Organizer: Grazer Eislaufverein & Skate Austria

The Ice Challenge – held in 2021 as the Cup of Austria – is an annual figure skating competition sanctioned by the International Skating Union (ISU), organized and hosted by the Grazer Eislaufverein (Skating Club of Graz) and Skate Austria at the Eisstadion Liebenau in Graz, Austria. The competition debuted as an international event in 2009; prior to that, it was a regional event called the Leo-Scheu-Gedächtnislaufen (Leo Scheu Memorial Skate), named in honor of Leo Scheu, the first president of the Grazer Eislaufverein. When the ISU launched the Challenger Series in 2014, the Ice Challenge was one of the inaugural competitions. The Ice Challenge has been a Challenger Series event four times during its history as of 2025. Medals are awarded in men's singles, women's singles, pair skating, and ice dance at the senior and junior levels; when the event is part of the Challenger Series, skaters earn points towards the World Standings and Season's World Ranking based on their results.

== History ==
The Ice Challenge – originally called the Leo-Scheu-Gedächtnislaufen, named in honor of Leo Scheu, the first president of the Grazer Eislaufverein – began in 1971 as a regional competition, organized and hosted by the Grazer Eislaufverein in Graz, Austria. In 2006, the Leo-Scheu-Gedächtnislaufen was expanded to allow competitors from all of Austria. In 2008, the competition allowed international competitors for the first time, and in 2009, it received official endorsement by the International Skating Union (ISU) and was placed on its international calendar.

The ISU Challenger Series was introduced in 2014. It is a series of international figure skating competitions sanctioned by the International Skating Union and organized by ISU member nations. The objective is to ensure consistent organization and structure within a series of international competitions linked together, providing opportunities for senior-level skaters to compete at the international level and also earn points towards the World Standings and Season's World Ranking. When an event is held as part of the Challenger Series, it must host at least three of the four disciplines (men's singles, women's singles, pair skating, and ice dance) and representatives from at least ten different ISU member nations. The minimum number of entrants required for each discipline is eight skaters each in men's singles and women's singles, five teams in pair skating, and six teams in ice dance. Each ISU member nation is eligible to enter up to three skaters or teams per discipline in each competition, although Skate Austria may enter an unlimited number of entrants in their own event. The Ice Challenge was one of the inaugural competitions. Douglas Razzano and Hannah Miller of the United States won the men's and women's events, respectively; Lina Fedorova and Maxim Miroshkin of Russia won the pairs event, and Maia Shibutani and Alex Shibutani of the United States won the ice dance event.

The Ice Challenge has been held several times since 2014, but was a Challenger Series event only in 2015, 2021, and 2022. It was scheduled to be a Challenger Series event in 2023 before the Grazer Eislaufverein cancelled the competition.

== Senior medalists ==
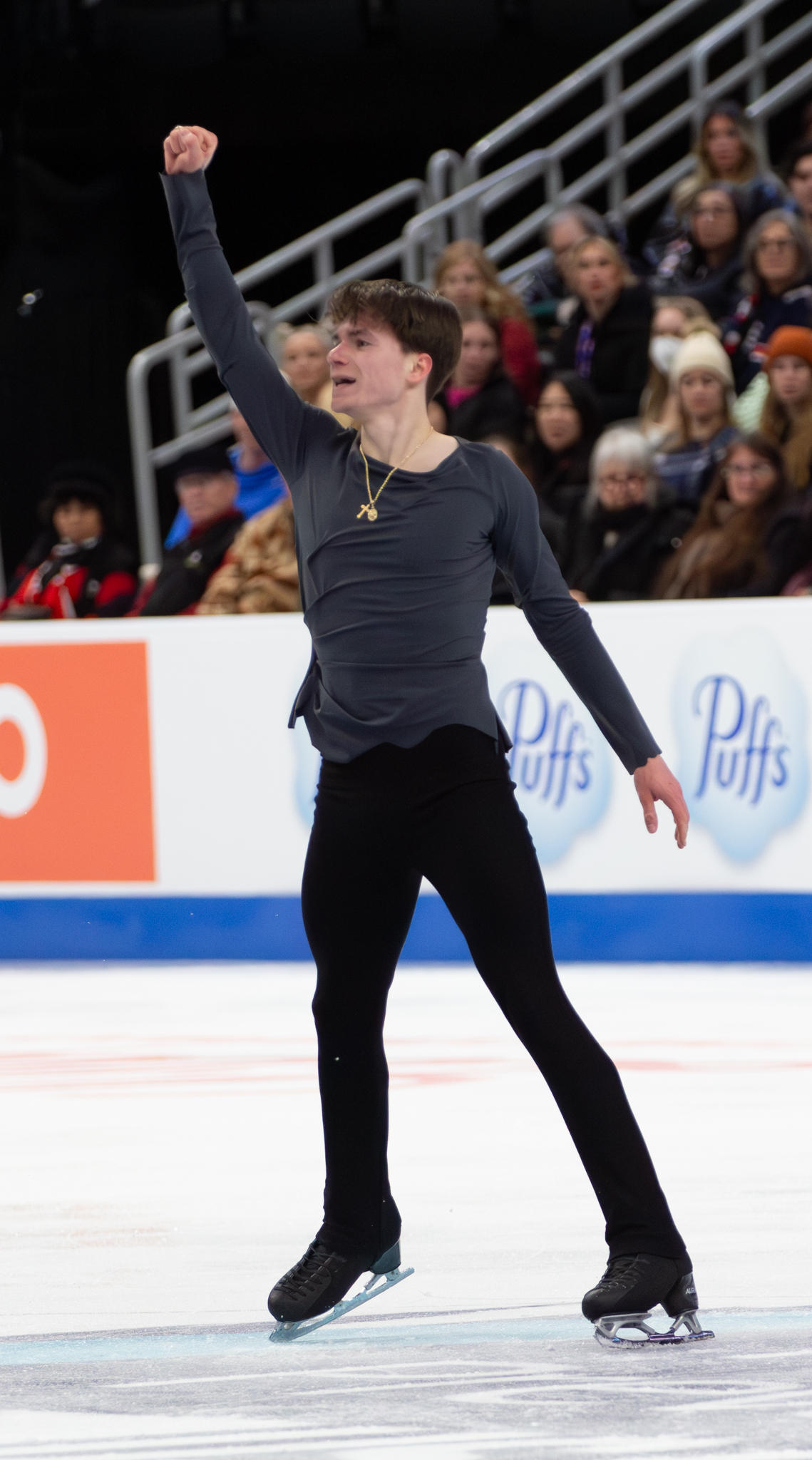
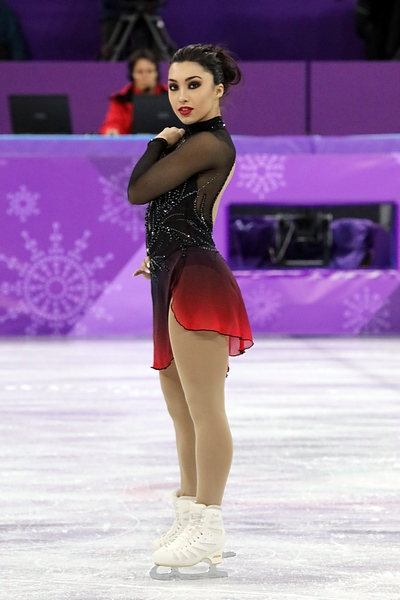
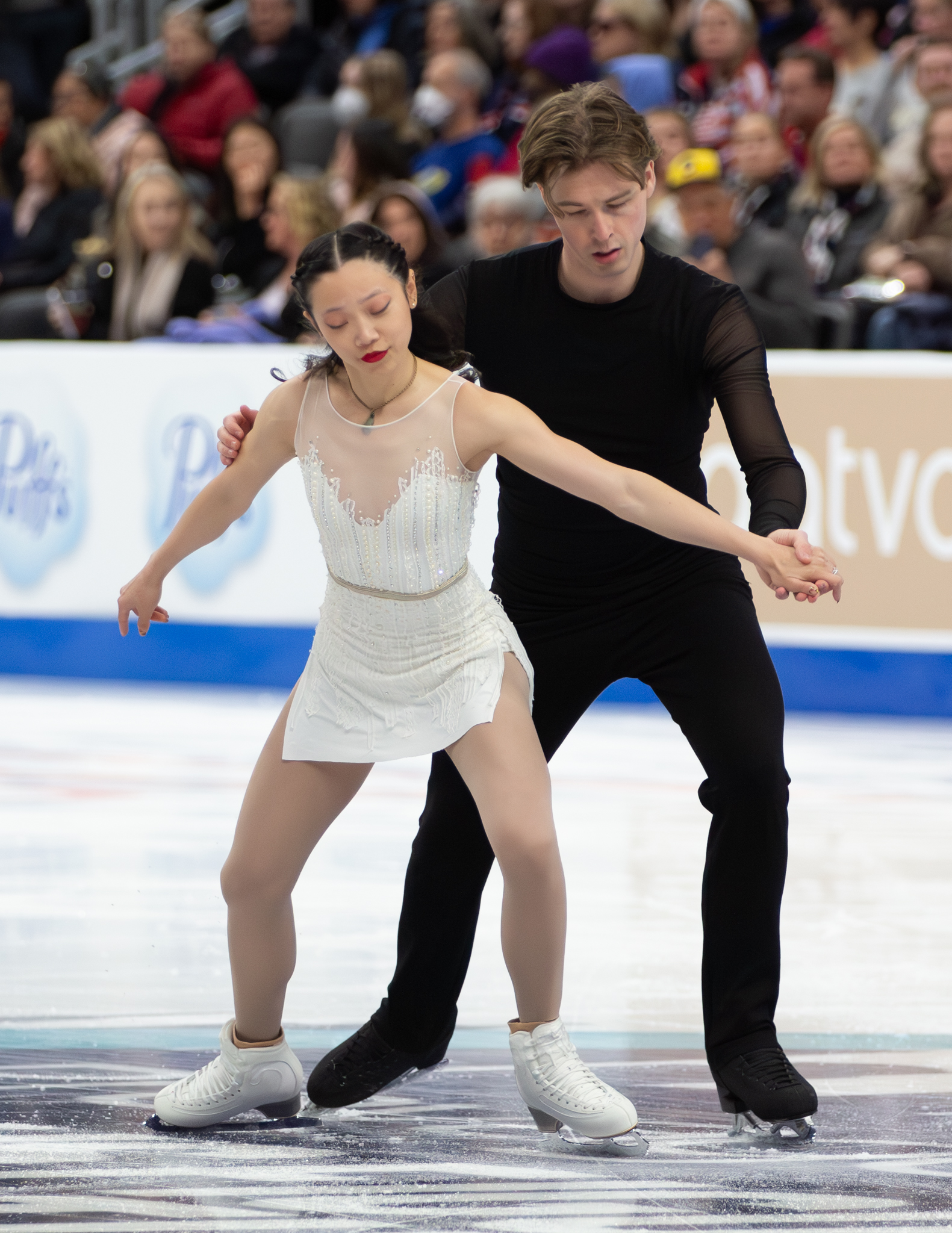
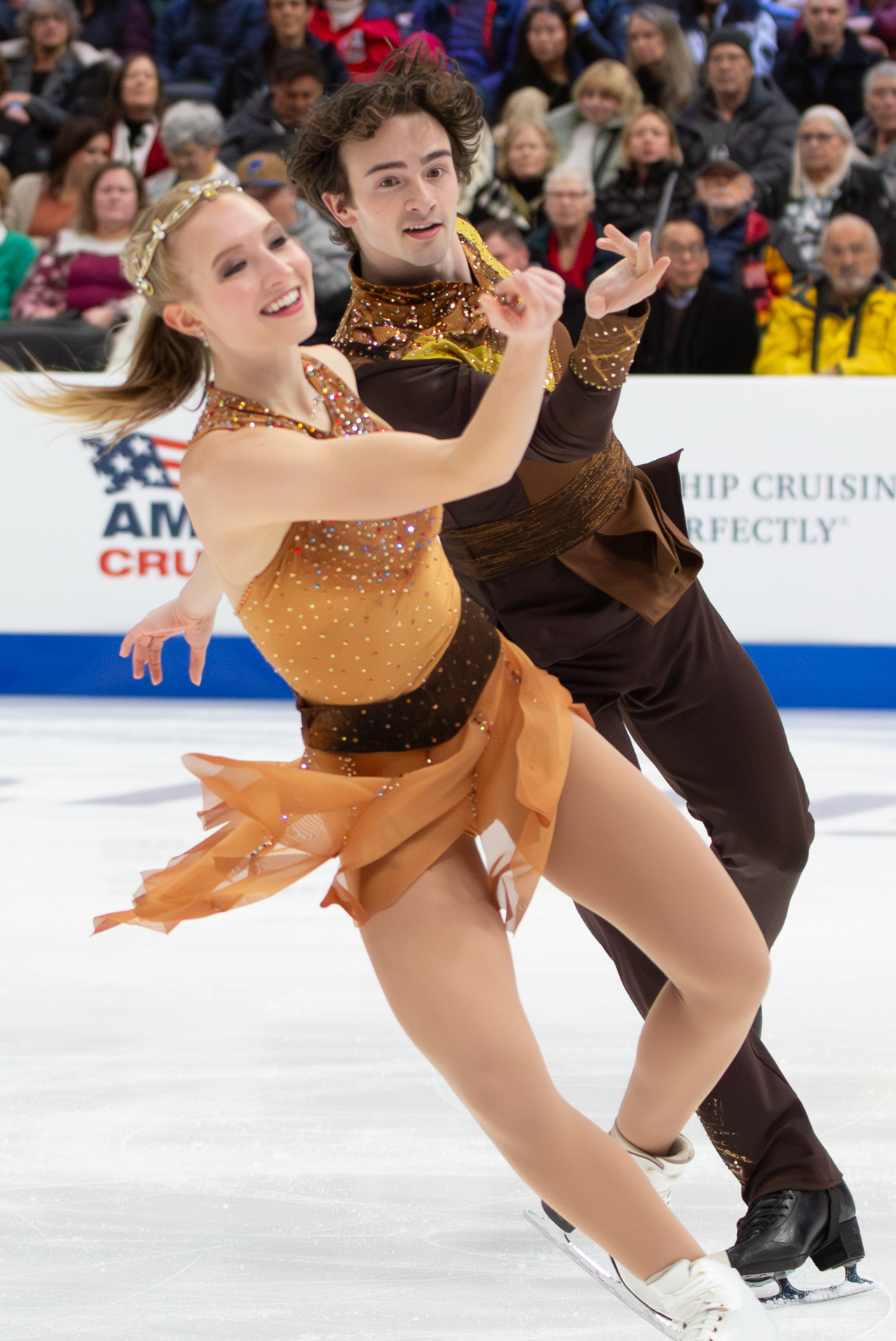
The 2025 Ice Challenge champions (from left to right): Maxim Naumov of the United States (men's singles); Gabrielle Daleman of Canada (women's singles); Chelsea Liu and Ryan Bedard of the United States (pair skating); and Eva Pate and Logan Bye of the United States (ice dance)

CS: Challenger Series event

=== Men's singles ===
Senior men's event medalists
Year	Gold	Silver	Bronze	Ref.
2009	(Czech Republic) Tomáš Verner	(Ukraine) Anton Kovalevski	(France) Alban Préaubert	
2010	(Sweden) Alexander Majorov	(United States) Douglas Razzano	(Sweden) Kristoffer Berntsson	
2011	(United States) Stephen Carriere	(Uzbekistan) Misha Ge	(Austria) Viktor Pfeifer	
2012	(Germany) Peter Liebers	(United States) Douglas Razzano	(United States) Armin Mahbanoozadeh	
2013	(Kazakhstan) Denis Ten	(Austria) Viktor Pfeifer	(Russia) Gordei Gorshkov	
2014 CS	(United States) Douglas Razzano	(Russia) Alexander Samarin	(Germany) Martin Rappe	
2015 CS	(Russia) Artur Dmitriev Jr.	(United States) Jason Brown	(Russia) Mikhail Kolyada	
2016	No competition held			
2017	(Italy) Daniel Grassl	(Spain) Javier Raya	(France) Adrien Tesson	
2018–20	No competitions held			
2021 CS	(Georgia (country)) Nika Egadze	(Japan) Lucas Tsuyoshi Honda	(United States) Ilia Malinin	
2022 CS	(United States) Liam Kapeikis	(Sweden) Andreas Nordebäck	(Germany) Nikita Starostin	
2023 CS	Competition cancelled			
2024	(Slovenia) David Sedej	(Austria) Anton Skoficz	No other competitors	
2025	(United States) Maxim Naumov	(United States) Jacob Sanchez	(Canada) Grayson Long	

=== Women's singles ===
Senior women's event medalists
Year	Gold	Silver	Bronze	Ref.
2009	(Japan) Kanako Murakami	(Italy) Valentina Marchei	(United States) Amanda Dobbs	
2010	(France) Léna Marrocco	(Ukraine) Natalia Popova	(Germany) Sarah Hecken	
2011	(United States) Caroline Zhang	(Ukraine) Natalia Popova	(Sweden) Linnea Mellgren	
2012	(United Kingdom) Jenna McCorkell	(Sweden) Isabelle Olsson	(Slovakia) Monika Simančíková	
2013	(United States) Courtney Hicks	(Japan) Miki Ando	(Slovakia) Nicole Rajičová	
2014 CS	(United States) Hannah Miller	(Sweden) Isabelle Olsson	(Hungary) Ivett Tóth	
2015 CS	(United States) Mirai Nagasu	(Russia) Maria Artemieva	(United States) Tyler Pierce	
2016	No competition held			
2017	(Slovenia) Daša Grm	(Italy) Giada Russo	(Austria) Natalie Klotz	
2018–20	No competitions held			
2021 CS	(Japan) Wakaba Higuchi	(South Korea) Park Yeon-jeong	(Estonia) Niina Petrõkina	
2022 CS	(Italy) Anna Pezzetta	(Canada) Kaiya Ruiter	(Switzerland) Kimmy Repond	
2023 CS	Competition cancelled			
2024	(Italy) Anna Pezzetta	(Slovenia) Julija Lovrencic	(Germany) Sarah Marie Pesch	
2025	(Canada) Gabrielle Daleman	(Canada) Kaiya Ruiter	(Austria) Olga Mikutina	

=== Pairs ===
Senior pairs' event medalists
Year	Gold	Silver	Bronze	Ref.
2009	(United States); Caitlin Yankowskas; John Coughlin	(United States); Chloe Katz; Joseph Lynch	(Italy); Stefania Berton; Ondřej Hotárek	
2010	(Germany); Maylin Hausch; Daniel Wende	(United States); Tiffany Vise; Don Baldwin	(North Korea); Ji Hyang Ri; Won Hyok Thae	
2011	(United States); Andrea Poapst; Chris Knierim	(Germany); Mari Vartmann; Aaron Van Cleave	(Israel); Danielle Montalbano; Evgeni Krasnopolski	
2012	(United States); Marissa Castelli; Simon Shnapir	(United States); Gretchen Donlan; Andrew Speroff	(Israel); Danielle Montalbano; Evgeni Krasnopolski	
2013	(United States); Gretchen Donlan; Andrew Speroff	(Germany); Maylin Hausch; Daniel Wende	(United States); Tarah Kayne; Daniel O'Shea	
2014 CS	(Russia); Lina Fedorova; Maxim Miroshkin	(Austria); Miriam Ziegler; Severin Kiefer	(Germany); Mari Vartmann; Aaron Van Cleave	
2015 CS	(United States); Alexa Scimeca; Chris Knierim	(Germany); Mari Vartmann; Ruben Blommaert	(Italy); Nicole Della Monica; Matteo Guarise	
2016	No competition held			
2017	(Germany); Lena Kreitmeier; Anton Kempf	No other competitors		
2018–20	No competitions held			
2021	(Australia); Campbell Young; Lachlan Lewer-Parr	No other competitors		
2022	(United States); Ellie Kam; Daniel O'Shea	(Netherlands); Nika Osipova; Dmitry Epstein	(Ukraine); Violetta Sierova; Ivan Khobta	
2023	Competition cancelled			
2024	(Austria); Gabriella Izzo; Luc Maierhofer	(United States); Nica Digerness; Mark Sadusky	(United States); Linzy Fitzpatrick; Keyton Bearinger	
2025	(United States); Chelsea Liu; Ryan Bedard	(United States); Audrey Shin; Balázs Nagy	(Canada); Ava Kemp; Yohnatan Elizarov	

=== Ice dance ===
Senior ice dance event medalists
Year	Gold	Silver	Bronze	Ref.
2009	(Hungary); Nóra Hoffmann; Maxim Zavozin	(United States); Lynn Kriengkrairut; Logan Giulietti-Schmitt	(Germany); Christina Beier; William Beier	
2010	(United Kingdom); Louise Walden; Owen Edwards	(Georgia (country)); Allison Reed; Otar Japaridze	(Germany); Tanja Kolbe; Stefano Caruso	
2011	(United States); Lynn Kriengkrairut; Logan Giulietti-Schmitt	(United States); Isabella Cannuscio; Ian Lorello	(Ukraine); Siobhan Heekin-Canedy; Dmitri Dun	
2012	(United States); Lynn Kriengkrairut; Logan Giulietti-Schmitt	(Czech Republic); Lucie Myslivečková; Neil Brown	(Switzerland); Ramona Elsener; Florian Roost	
2013	(United States); Anastasia Cannuscio; Colin McManus	(Denmark); Laurence Fournier Beaudry; Nikolaj Sørensen	(Germany); Tanja Kolbe; Stefano Caruso	
2014 CS	(United States); Maia Shibutani; Alex Shibutani	(Denmark); Laurence Fournier Beaudry; Nikolaj Sørensen	(Austria); Barbora Silná; Juri Kurakin	
2015 CS	(United States); Danielle Thomas; Daniel Eaton	(Italy); Misato Komatsubara; Andrea Fabbri	(Finland); Olesia Karmi; Max Lindholm	
2016	No competition held			
2017	(Finland); Cecilia Törn; Jussiville Partanen	(United Kingdom); Lilah Fear; Lewis Gibson	(Finland); Juulia Turkkila; Matthias Versluis	
2018–20	No competitions held			
2021 CS	(Italy); Charlène Guignard; Marco Fabbri	(Canada); Laurence Fournier Beaudry; Nikolaj Sørensen	(Spain); Olivia Smart; Adrián Díaz	
2022 CS	(United States); Emily Bratti; Ian Somerville	(France); Natacha Lagouge; Arnaud Caffa	(Canada); Lily Hensen; Nathan Lickers	
2023 CS	Competition cancelled			
2024	(Australia); Holly Harris; Jason Chan	(United States); Amy Cui; Jonathan Rogers	(Italy); Leia Dozzi; Pietro Papetti	
2025	(United States); Eva Pate; Logan Bye	(Canada); Jamie Fournier; Everest Zhu	(Italy); Leia Dozzi; Pietro Papetti	

== Junior medalists ==
=== Men's singles ===
Junior men's event medalists
Year	Gold	Silver	Bronze	Ref.
2009	(Germany) Franz Streubel	(Poland) Kamil Białas	(Switzerland) Timothy Leemann	
2010	(Ukraine) Stanislav Pertsov	(Germany) Martin Rappe	(Ukraine) Olexander Kucher	
2011	(United Kingdom) Peter James Hallam	(Poland) Kamil Dymowski	(Switzerland) Nicola Todeschini	
2012	(Czech Republic) Tomáš Kupka	(Germany) Alexander Bjelde	(United Kingdom) Peter James Hallam	
2013	(Russia) Alexei Genya	(Czech Republic) Tomáš Kupka	(France) Charles Tetar	
2014	(Russia) Dmitri Aliev	(South Korea) Byun Se-jong	(Germany) Anton Kempf	
2015	(Russia) Petr Gumennik	(Italy) Daniel Grassl	(Germany) Catalin Dimitrescu	
2016	No competition held			
2017	(Germany) Jonathan Hess	(Italy) Gabriele Frangipani	(Italy) Nik Folini	
2018–20	No competitions held			
2021	(Switzerland) Naoki Rossi	(Canada) Aleksa Rakic	(Turkey) Alp Eren Özkan	
2022	(Sweden) Hugo Bostedt	(Austria) Tobia Oellerer	(United Kingdom) Connor Bray	
2023	Competition cancelled			
2024	(Austria) Maksym Petrychenko	(Germany) Hugo Willi Herrmann	(Austria) Daniel Ruis	
2025	(Canada) William Chan	(Austria) Maksym Petrychenko	(Germany) Robert Wildt	

=== Women's singles ===
Junior women's event medalists
Year	Gold	Silver	Bronze	Ref.
2009	(Estonia) Gerli Liinamäe	(Czech Republic) Barbora Švédová	(Switzerland) Anastasia Kistler	
2010	(Slovakia) Monika Simančíková	(Sweden) Isabelle Olsson	(Austria) Lara Eisenbauer	
2011	(Russia) Kristina Zaseeva	(Sweden) Elin Hallberg	(Sweden) Gabriella Josefsson	
2012	(Austria) Sabrina Schulz	(Germany) Minami Hanashiro	(Finland) Nelma Hede	
2013	(Germany) Maria Herceg	(Czech Republic) Anna Dušková	(Switzerland) Yasmine Kimiko Yamada	
2014	(Germany) Lea Johanna Dastich	(South Korea) Byun Ji-hyun	(Czech Republic) Anna Dušková	
2015	(Russia) Stanislava Konstantinova	(Russia) Maria Perederova	(Germany) Kristina Isaev	
2016	No competition held			
2017	(Italy) Alessia Tornaghi	(Austria) Stefanie Pesendorfer	(Hungary) Júlia Láng	
2018–20	No competitions held			
2021	(Hungary) Vivien Papp	(Estonia) Amalia Zelenjak	(Belarus) Varvara Kisel	
2022	(Switzerland) Sarina Joos	(Hungary) Polina Dzsumanyijazova	(Estonia) Marianne Must	
2023	Competition cancelled			
2024	(Cyprus) Vasilisa Bogomolova	(Czech Republic) Nela Snebergerova	(Austria) Flora Marie Schaller	
2025	(Estonia) Maria Eliise Kaljuvere	(United States) Sherry Zhang	(Canada) Quinn Startek	

=== Pairs ===
Junior pairs event medalists
Year	Gold	Silver	Bronze	Ref.
2009	(Czech Republic); Klára Kadlecová; Petr Bidař	(Russia); Evgenia Krapivina; Konstantin Medovikov	(United Kingdom); Catherine Clement; James Hunt	
2010	(Netherlands); Rachel Epstein; Dmitry Epstein	No other competitors		
2011	(Russia); Lina Fedorova; Maxim Miroshkin	(Poland); Magdalena Klatka; Radosław Chruściński	(Austria); Stina Martini; Severin Kiefer	
2012	(Germany); Annabelle Prölß; Ruben Blommaert	No other competitors		
2013	(Czech Republic); Anna Dušková; Martin Bidař	No other competitors		
2014	(Czech Republic); Anna Dušková; Martin Bidař	No other competitors		
2015	No junior pairs competition			
2016	No competition held			
2017	(Italy); Sara Carli; Marco Pauletti	No other competitors		
2018–20	No competitions held			
2021	(France); Oxana Vouillamoz; Flavien Giniaux	(Australia); Campbell Young; Lachlan Lewer-Parr	No other competitors	
2022	(Canada); Ashlyn Schmitz; Tristan Taylor	(Germany); Sonja Löwenherz; Robert Löwenherz	No other competitors	
2023	Competition cancelled			
2024	(Italy); Polina Polman; Gabriel Renoldi	(Spain); Ines Moudden; Alejandro Lázaro García	(Italy); Elisabetta Profaizer; Matteo Libasse Mandelli	
2025	(Czech Republic); Johanka Zilková; Matyas Becerra	(Austria); Paola Jurisic; Michail Savenkov	(France); Ninon Dapoigny; Connor O'Grady	

=== Ice dance ===
Junior ice dance event medalists
Year	Gold	Silver	Bronze	Ref.
2009	(Germany); Stefanie Frohberg; Tim Giesen	(Ukraine); Maria Nosulia; Evgeni Kholoniuk	(Switzerland); Ramona Elsener; Florian Roost	
2010	(Czech Republic); Karolina Procházková; Michal Češka	(Ukraine); Lolita Yermak; Alexander Liubchenko	(Czech Republic); Jana Čejková; Alexandr Sinicyn	
2011	(Israel); Ekaterina Bugrov; Vasili Rogov	(United Kingdom); Sophie Jones; Richard Sharpe	(Germany); Ria Schiffner; Julian Salatzki	
2012	(Turkey); Çağla Demirsal; Berk Akalın	(Russia); Julia Dolgikh; Alexandr Prachanov	(Russia); Alla Loboda; Pavel Drozd	
2013	(Hungary); Carolina Moscheni; Ádám Lukács	(France); Estelle Elizabeth; Romain Le Gac	(Austria); Christine Smith; Simon Eisenbauer	
2014	(Hungary); Carolina Moscheni; Ádám Lukács	(Italy); Sara Ghislandi; Giona Ortenzi	(Russia); Eva Khachaturian; Andrei Bagin	
2015	No junior ice dance competition			
2016	No competition held			
2017	(United Kingdom); Sasha Fear; George Waddell	(Germany); Ria Schwendinger; Valentin Wunderlich	(Hungary); Villö Marton; Danijil Szemko	
2018–20	No competitions held			
2021	(Canada); Natalie D'Alessandro; Bruce Waddell	(Czech Republic); Kateřina Mrázková; Daniel Mrázek	(Spain); Sofía Val; Nikita Vitryanyuk	
2022	(Czech Republic); Kateřina Mrázková; Daniel Mrázek	(Slovakia); Anna Simova; Kirill Aksenov	(Austria); Anita Straub; Andreas Straub	
2023	Competition cancelled			
2024	(Italy); Noemi Maria Tali; Noah Lafornara	(France); Ambre Perrier Gianesini; Samuel Blanc Klaperman	(Italy); Laura Finelli; Massimiliano Bucciarelli	
2025	(Canada); Laurence Briere; Julien Levesque	(Germany); Mia Lee Mayer; Atl Ongay-Perez	(Hungary); Diane Gallix; Elod Egyed-Zsigmond	

== Cumulative medal count (senior medalists) ==
=== Men's singles ===
Total number of Ice Challenge medals in men's singles by nation
Rank	Nation	Gold	Silver	Bronze	Total
1	United States	4	4	2	10
2	Russia	1	1	2	4
3	Sweden	1	1	1	3
4	Germany	1	0	2	3
5	Czech Republic	1	0	0	1
5	Georgia	1	0	0	1
5	Italy	1	0	0	1
5	Kazakhstan	1	0	0	1
5	Slovenia	1	0	0	1
10	Austria	0	2	1	3
11	Japan	0	1	0	1
11	Spain	0	1	0	1
11	Ukraine	0	1	0	1
11	Uzbekistan	0	1	0	1
15	France	0	0	2	2
16	Canada	0	0	1	1
Totals (16 entries)		12	12	11	35

=== Women's singles ===
Total number of Ice Challenge medals in women's singles by nation
Rank	Nation	Gold	Silver	Bronze	Total
1	United States	4	0	2	6
2	Italy	2	2	0	4
3	Japan	2	1	0	3
4	Canada	1	2	0	3
5	Slovenia	1	1	0	2
6	France	1	0	0	1
6	Great Britain	1	0	0	1
8	Sweden	0	2	1	3
9	Ukraine	0	2	0	2
10	Russia	0	1	0	1
10	South Korea	0	1	0	1
12	Austria	0	0	2	2
12	Germany	0	0	2	2
12	Slovakia	0	0	2	2
15	Estonia	0	0	1	1
15	Hungary	0	0	1	1
15	Switzerland	0	0	1	1
Totals (17 entries)		12	12	12	36

=== Pairs ===
Total number of Ice Challenge medals in pairs by nation
Rank	Nation	Gold	Silver	Bronze	Total
1	United States	7	5	2	14
2	Germany	2	3	1	6
3	Austria	1	1	0	2
4	Australia	1	0	0	1
4	Russia	1	0	0	1
6	Netherlands	0	1	0	1
7	Israel	0	0	2	2
7	Italy	0	0	2	2
9	Canada	0	0	1	1
9	North Korea	0	0	1	1
9	Ukraine	0	0	1	1
Totals (11 entries)		12	10	10	32

=== Ice dance ===
Total number of Ice Challenge medals in ice dance by nation
Rank	Nation	Gold	Silver	Bronze	Total
1	United States	7	3	0	10
2	Italy	1	1	2	4
3	Great Britain	1	1	0	2
4	Finland	1	0	2	3
5	Australia	1	0	0	1
5	Hungary	1	0	0	1
7	Canada	0	2	1	3
8	Denmark	0	2	0	2
9	Czech Republic	0	1	0	1
9	France	0	1	0	1
9	Georgia	0	1	0	1
12	Germany	0	0	3	3
13	Austria	0	0	1	1
13	Spain	0	0	1	1
13	Switzerland	0	0	1	1
13	Ukraine	0	0	1	1
Totals (16 entries)		12	12	12	36

=== Total medals ===
Total number of Ice Challenge medals by nation
Rank	Nation	Gold	Silver	Bronze	Total
1	United States	22	12	6	40
2	Italy	4	3	4	11
3	Germany	3	3	8	14
4	Russia	2	2	2	6
5	Japan	2	2	0	4
6	Great Britain	2	1	0	3
6	Slovenia	2	1	0	3
8	Australia	2	0	0	2
9	Canada	1	4	3	8
10	Austria	1	3	4	8
11	Sweden	1	3	2	6
12	France	1	1	2	4
13	Czech Republic	1	1	0	2
13	Georgia	1	1	0	2
15	Finland	1	0	2	3
16	Hungary	1	0	1	2
17	Kazakhstan	1	0	0	1
18	Ukraine	0	3	2	5
19	Denmark	0	2	0	2
20	Spain	0	1	1	2
21	Netherlands	0	1	0	1
21	South Korea	0	1	0	1
21	Uzbekistan	0	1	0	1
24	Israel	0	0	2	2
24	Slovakia	0	0	2	2
24	Switzerland	0	0	2	2
27	Estonia	0	0	1	1
27	North Korea	0	0	1	1
Totals (28 entries)		48	46	45	139
