= Juri Kurakin =

Estonian ice dancer

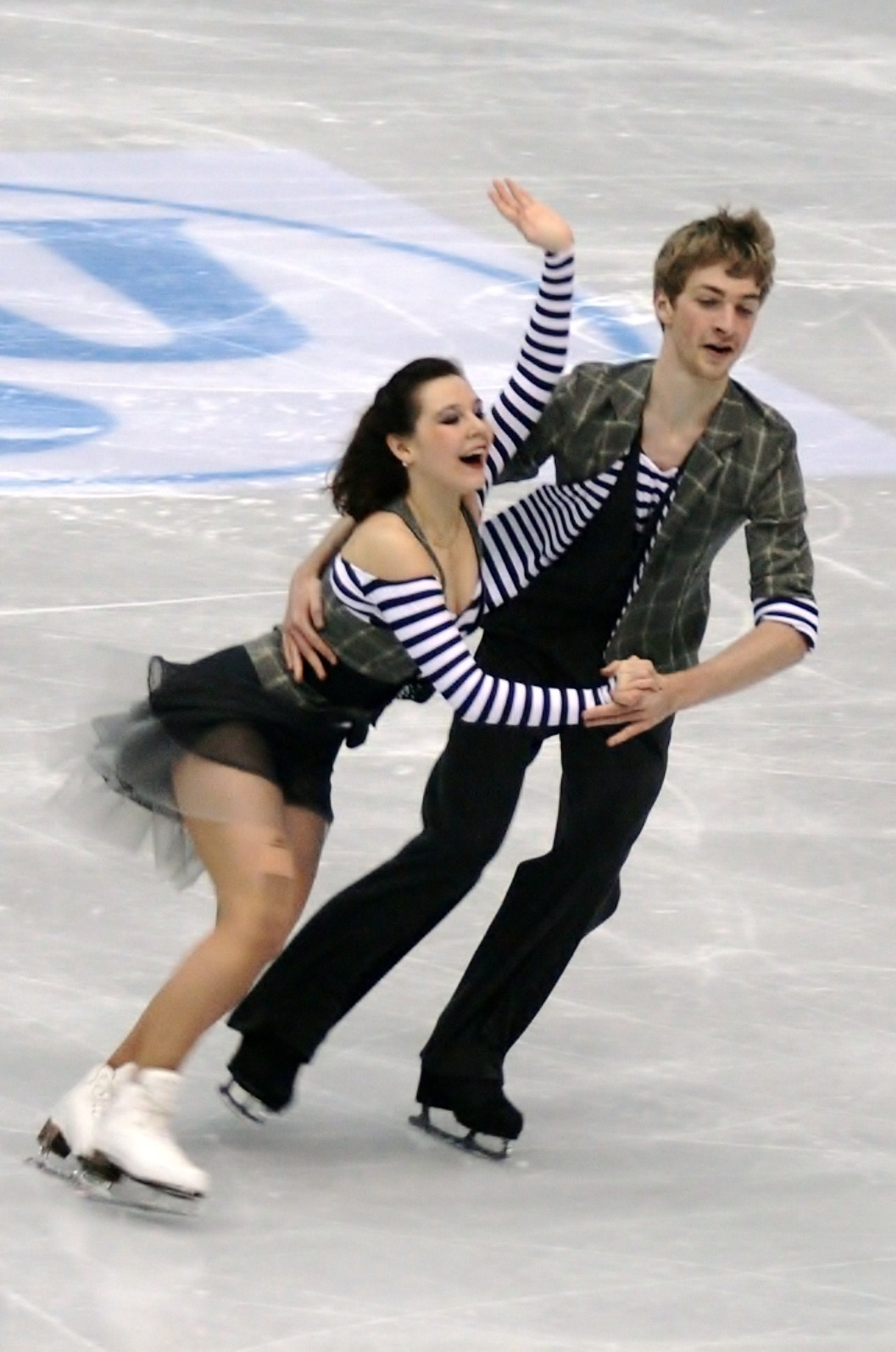
- Silná/Kurakin in 2012

Personal information
- Born: 3 August 1987 (age 39) Tallinn, then part of Estonian SSR, Soviet Union
- Height: 1.87 m (6 ft 2 in)

Figure skating career
- Country: Austria
- Partner: Barbora Silná
- Skating club: EKE Vienna; Grazer Eislaufverein
- Began skating: 1992
- Retired: August 3, 2016

Juri Kurakin (born 3 August 1987) is a former competitive ice dancer who is best known for his partnership with Barbora Silná for Austria. Together, they won three Austrian national titles and reached the final segment at three ISU Championships. Earlier in his career, Kurakin competed for Estonia and Bulgaria.

== Personal life ==
Kurakin was born 3 August 1987 in Tallinn, Estonia. He is the younger brother of Dmitri Kurakin, an ice dancer who competed internationally for Estonia and Germany.

== Career ==
=== Early career ===
Kurakin began learning to skate in 1992. Early in his career, he competed with Alexandra Baurina for Estonia.

In 2005, Kurakin began skating with Ina Demireva, with whom he represented Bulgaria. Initially coached by Oksana Potdykova, Demireva/Kurakin decided to train under Svetlana Alexeeva and Elena Kustarova in Moscow in the 2006–07 and 2007–08 seasons. They switched to Oleg Volkov and Alexander Zhulin for their final season together, 2008–09.

=== Partnership with Silná ===
Kurakin teamed up with Czech-Austrian skater Barbora Silná in 2010. The two decided to represent Austria. In the 2010–11 season, they were coached by Dmitri Sildoja and Vitali Schulz in Dortmund and Vienna. The following season, training under Muriel Zazoui and Romain Haguenauer in Lyon and Graz, they won their first Austrian national title. During the next two seasons, they finished second to Kira Geil / Tobias Eisenbauer at the Austrian Championships. In the 2013–14 season, they switched to Barbara Fusar-Poli in Milan.

Having missed qualifying for the free dance at three ISU Championship, Silná/Kurakin were successful for the first time at the 2015 Europeans in Stockholm, where they finished 18th. At the 2015 Worlds in Shanghai, they ranked 21st in the short and did not advance further.

Stefano Caruso joined Fusar-Poli as the duo's coach in the 2015–16 season. Silná/Kurakin reached the final segment at the 2016 Europeans in Bratislava and at the 2016 Worlds in Boston, where they placed 17th and 20th, respectively. They announced their retirement on 3 August 2016 due to Silná's back problems.

== Programs ==
=== With Silná ===
Season	Short dance	Free dance
2015–16	Waltz & Polka: Die Fledermaus by Johann Strauss II	Lawrence of Arabia by Maurice Jarre
2014–15	Paso doble: España cañí by Pascual Marquina Narro	Sorry Seems to Be the Hardest Word; Funeral for a Friend Love Lies Bleeding by Elton John
2013–14	Slow foxtrot: Just One Dance; Quickstep: That Man by Caro Emerald	Lost Generation (from "Chronicles"); Cerebral Beauty by Audiomachine
2011–12	Rhumba: Ain't No Sunshine by Bill Withers performed by Will Young; Cha cha: Perhaps, Perhaps, Perhaps performed by The Pussycat Dolls	Amélie by Yann Tiersen
2010–11	Waltz: La Valse d'Amélie (from Amélie) by Yann Tiersen; Quickstep: Jumping Jack by Big Bad Voodoo Daddy	Ritornare (from Corteo)

=== With Demireva ===
Season	Original dance	Free dance
2008–09	Slow foxtrot: Selection; Quickstep: Selection by Louis Armstrong	Kill Bill
2007–08	Serbian folk: Selection by Goran Bregović	Harem by Sarah Brightman
2006–07	El Tango de Roxanne (from Moulin Rouge!)	Harem by Sarah Brightman

== Results ==
CS: Challenger Series; JGP: Junior Grand Prix

=== With Silná for Austria ===
International
Event	10–11	11–12	12–13	13–14	14–15	15–16
Worlds		36th			21st	20th
Europeans		24th		25th	18th	17th
CS DS Cup						5th
CS Finlandia Trophy						9th
CS Ice Challenge						4th
CS Nepela Trophy		7th			5th	
Cup of Nice		11th				
Ice Challenge		5th				
Mont Blanc	8th					
Nebelhorn Trophy	16th					
NRW Trophy						2nd
Pavel Roman		8th				
Trophy of Lyon	5th	2nd				
National
Austrian Champ.	2nd	1st	2nd	2nd	1st	1st

=== With Demireva for Bulgaria ===
International
Event	05–06	06–07	07–08	08–09
Worlds			30th	29th
Europeans				25th
Golden Spin				8th
Nepela Memorial				8th
International: Junior
Junior Worlds		25th	24th	
JGP Bulgaria			13th	
JGP Czech Rep.		15th		
JGP Romania		15th	13th	
National
Bulgarian Champ.	2nd		1st	

=== With Baurina for Estonia ===
International
Event	2004–05
ISU Junior Grand Prix in Germany	17th
