= Danielle Thomas =

Australian tennis player

- Country (sports): Australia
- Born: 23 April 1973 (age 51)
- Prize money: $13,662

Singles
- Career titles: 0
- Highest ranking: No. 384 (11 October 1993)

Grand Slam singles results
- Australian Open: Q1 (1994)

Doubles
- Career titles: 1 ITF
- Highest ranking: No. 237 (9 May 1994)

Grand Slam doubles results
- Wimbledon: 1R (1993)

Danielle Thomas (born 23 April 1973) is an Australian former professional tennis player.

Thomas competed on the professional tour in the early 1990s, reaching a best ranking of 384 in singles and 237 in doubles. Her biggest achievement was qualifying for the main draw of the women's doubles at the 1993 Wimbledon Championships, with Austria's Heidi Sprung. They were beaten in the first round by Lindsay Davenport and Chanda Rubin.

== ITF finals ==
Legend
$50,000 tournaments
$25,000 tournaments
$10,000 tournaments

=== Doubles (1–2) ===
Outcome	No.	Date	Tournament	Surface	Partner	Opponents	Score
Winner	1.	19 July 1992	ITF Frinton, Great Britain	Grass	(United Kingdom) Caroline Billingham	(Australia) Robyn Mawdsley (Namibia) Elizma Nortje	6–2, 4–6, 7–6
Runner-up	2.	14 March 1993	ITF Wodonga, Australia	Grass	(Australia) Robyn Mawdsley	(Australia) Kate McDonald (Australia) Jane Taylor	6–2, 3–6, 3–6
Runner-up	3.	5 July 1993	ITF Erlangen, Germany	Clay	(Slovakia) Janette Husárová	(Russia) Elena Makarova (Russia) Eugenia Maniokova	1–6, 4–6
