= Vanessa Giunchi =

Italian figure skater

Personal information
- Born: 7 June 1980 (age 46) Milan, Italy
- Height: 1.58 m (5 ft 2 in)

Figure skating career
- Country: Italy
- Skating club: H.I.L. Vallee d' Aoste
- Began skating: 1984
- Retired: 2003

Medal record
Italian Championships
Gold medal – first place	1995 Rome	Singles
Gold medal – first place	2001 Milan	Singles
Silver medal – second place	1996	Singles
Silver medal – second place	1997 Roccaraso	Singles
Silver medal – second place	1999 Milan	Singles
Silver medal – second place	2000 Merano	Singles
Silver medal – second place	2002 Collalbo	Singles
Silver medal – second place	2003 Lecco	Singles
Bronze medal – third place	1993 Rome	Singles
Bronze medal – third place	1998 Courmayeur	Singles

Vanessa Giunchi (born 7 June 1980 in Milan) is an Italian former competitive figure skater. She is a two-time (1995, 2001) Italian national champion and represented Italy at the 2002 Winter Olympics in Salt Lake City, Utah.

Early in her career, she was coached by Carlo Fassi.

== Programs ==
Season	Short program	Free skating
2002–2003	Indian dance	Concerto for Piano and Violin by Franck
2001–2002	La traviata by Giuseppe Verdi	Bolero by Maurice Ravel
2000–2001	Swan Lake by Pyotr Tchaikovsky	Schindler's List by John Williams

== Results ==
GP = Grand Prix; JGP = Junior Grand Prix (ISU Junior Series)

International
Event	1992–93	1993–94	1994–95	1995–96	1996–97	1997–98	1998–99	1999–00	2000–01	2001–02	2002–03
Olympics										20th	
Worlds										21st	27th
Europeans									10th	19th	20th
GP Skate America										11th	
Crystal Skate											2nd
Golden Spin											8th
Karl Schäfer										10th	
International: Junior
Junior Worlds		13th QR	25th		28th						
JGP Germany						18th					
Blue Swords		12th J.	16th J.								
Gardena		16th J.	5th J.								
St. Gervais			7th								
PFSA Trophy			2nd J.								
Salchow Trophy					3rd J.						
National
Italian Championships	3rd (Note: Information provided through personal correspondence from Cristina Mauri: "Nel 1993 io ho vinto il campionato Italiano a Roma. Seconda è arrivata Silvia Fontana e terza Vanessa Giunchi.")	2nd	1st	2nd	2nd	3rd	2nd	2nd	1st	2nd	2nd
