= Elisabetta Leccardi =

Italian figure skater

Personal information
- Born: 26 November 2001 (age 24) Segrate, Italy
- Height: 1.72 m (5 ft 7 1/2 in)

Figure skating career
- Country: Italy
- Partner: Mattia Dalla Torre
- Coach: Marilù Guarnieri
- Skating club: Agorà Skating Team
- Began skating: 2005

Medal record
Italian Championships
| Bronze medal – third place | 2018 Milan | Singles |
| Bronze medal – third place | 2022 Turin | Ice dance |

Elisabetta Leccardi (born 26 November 2001) is an Italian figure skater. She is the 2018 Jégvirág Cup champion, the 2018 Sofia Trophy silver medalist, the 2018 Christmas Cup bronze medalist, and the 2017 Italian national bronze medalist. She has competed in the final segment at two ISU Championships, including the 2018 World Championships.

== Personal life ==
Leccardi was born on 26 November 2001 in Segrate, Italy. She attends a Liceo delle Scienze Umane.

== Career ==
=== Early years ===
Leccardi began learning to skate in 2005. Marilù Guarnieri became her coach around 2013.

Leccardi competed internationally on the advanced novice level in 2014. She placed 5th in the junior ladies' event at Skate Helena in January 2015 but was subsequently disqualified because she was too young to compete in that category.

Leccardi became age-eligible for junior international competitions at the start of the 2015–2016 season and placed 6th in the junior ranks at the Italian Championships. She debuted on the ISU Junior Grand Prix (JGP) series in September 2016, placing 8th in Yokohama, Japan. After winning the national junior title, Leccardi was named in Italy's team to the 2017 World Junior Championships in Taipei, Taiwan. She qualified to the final segment by placing 14th in the short program and finishing 18th overall (21st in the free skate).

=== 2017–2018 season ===
Leccardi began her season in the junior ranks, placing 10th at both of her JGP assignments. In December, she won the senior bronze medal at the Italian Championships. She was selected to represent Italy at the 2018 World Championships and qualified to the free skate. She ranked 23rd in the short program, 17th in the free skate, and 21st overall at the event, which took place in March in Milan. During the season, her coaches included Guarnieri, Karel Zelenka Junior, Marco Fabbri, and Nicoletta Dellerma.

== Programs ==
| Season | Short program | Free skating |
|---|---|---|
| 2017–2018 | Je suis malade performed by Lara Fabian | Madama Butterfly by Giacomo Puccini |
| 2016–2017 | Rain In Your Black Eyes by Ezio Bosso | Je suis malade performed by Lara Fabian |

== Competitive highlights ==
CS: Challenger Series; JGP: Junior Grand Prix

=== Ice dancing with Dalla Torre ===
International
| Event | 21–22 | 22–23 |
|---|---|---|
| CS Ice Challenge | | WD |
| CS Lombardia | | 7th |
| CS Nebelhorn | | 9th |
| Bavarian Open | 7th | |
| Cup of Nice | | 7th |
| Egna Trophy | 8th | |
| Mezzaluna Cup | | WD |
National
| Italian Champ. | 3rd | |

=== Women's singles ===
International
| Event | 14–15 | 15–16 | 16–17 | 17–18 | 18–19 | 19–20 | 20–21 |
|---|---|---|---|---|---|---|---|
| Worlds | | | | 21st | | | |
| CS Alpen Trophy | | | | | 22nd | | |
| CS Golden Spin | | | | 10th | WD | | |
| Bavarian Open | | | | 4th | WD | 15th | |
| Christmas Cup | | | | | 3rd | | |
| Cup of Tyrol | | | | | WD | | |
| Crystal Skate | | | | | 16th | | |
| Jégvirág Cup | | | | 1st | | | |
| Open d'Andorra | | | | | | WD | |
| Sofia Trophy | | | | 2nd | | | |
| Tallink Hotels Cup | | | | | | 11th | |
International: Junior
| Junior Worlds | | | 18th | | | | |
| JGP Croatia | | | | 10th | | | |
| JGP Italy | | | | 10th | | | |
| JGP Japan | | | 8th | | | | |
| Coupe Printemps | | 4th | | | | | |
| Gardena Trophy | | 3rd | | | | | |
| Hellmut Seibt | | 6th | | | | | |
| Merano Cup | | 6th J | 2nd | | | | |
| NRW Trophy | | | 3rd | | | | |
| Santa Claus Cup | | 6th | | | | | |
| Skate Helena | DQ | | 4th | | | | |
National
| Italian Champ. | 10th J | 6th J | 1st J | 3rd | | 6th | 6th |
