= Silvia Fontana =

Italian figure skater

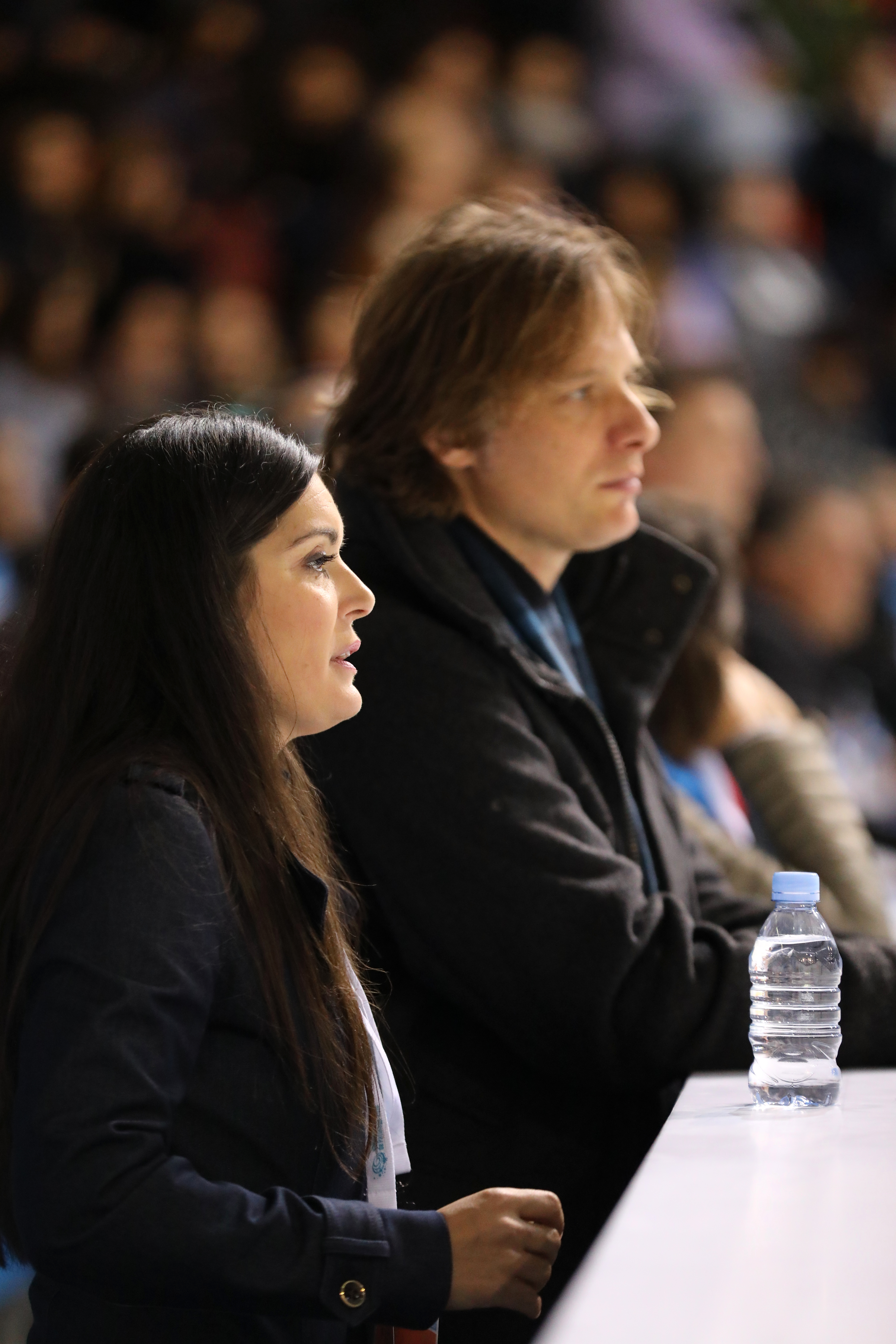

Personal information
- Born: December 3, 1976 (age 49) Staten Island, New York
- Height: 1.58 m (5 ft 2 in)

Figure skating career
- Country: Italy
- Began skating: 1980
- Retired: 2006

Medal record
Italian Championships
Gold medal – first place	1994	Singles
Gold medal – first place	1996	Singles
Gold medal – first place	1999 Milan	Singles
Gold medal – first place	2000 Merano	Singles
Gold medal – first place	2002 Collalbo	Singles
Silver medal – second place	1998 Courmayeur	Singles
Silver medal – second place	2001 Milan	Singles
Silver medal – second place	2006 Sesto San Giovanni	Singles
Bronze medal – third place	1997 Roccaraso	Singles

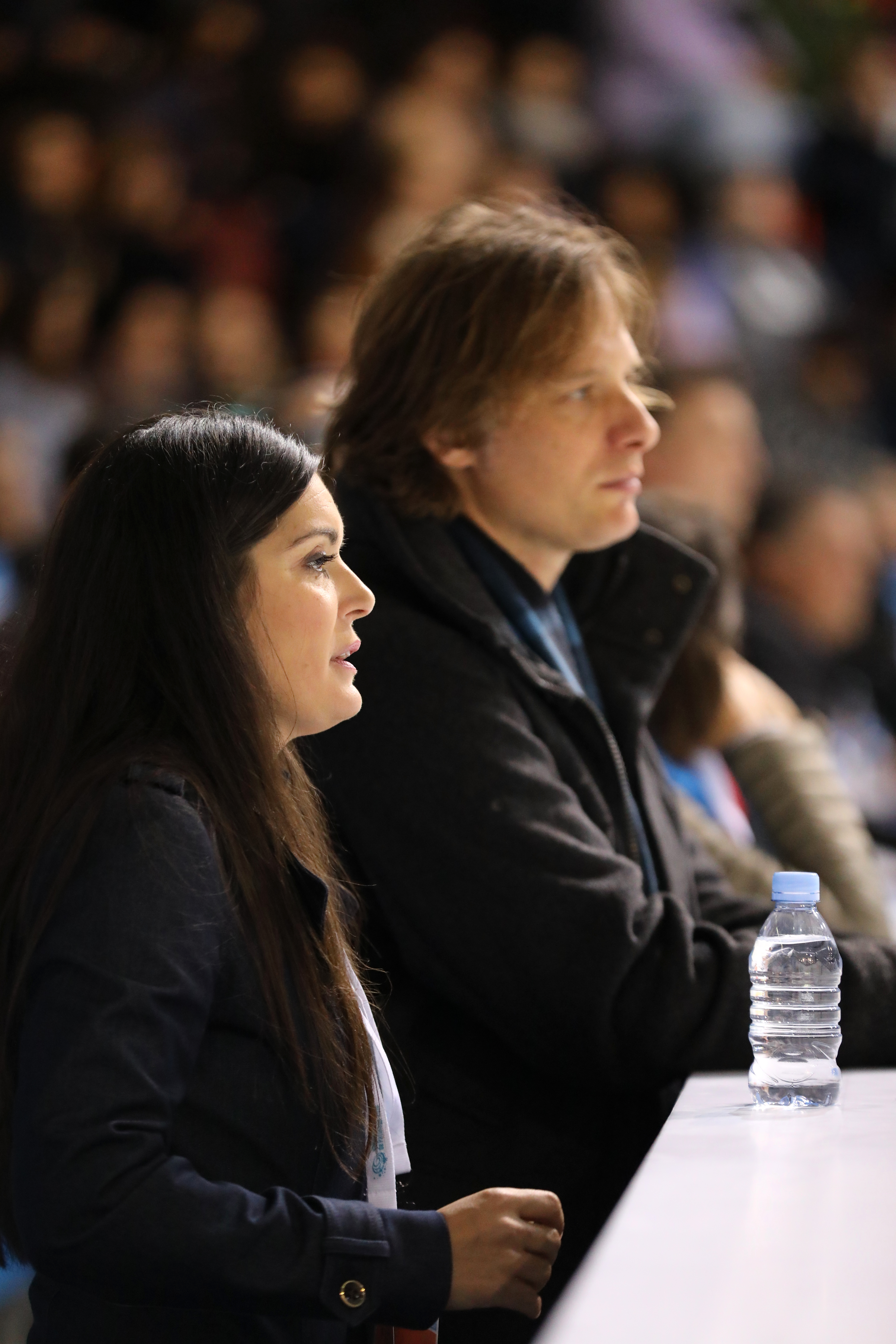
John Zimmerman and Silvia Fontana

Silvia Fontana (born December 3, 1976) is a former figure skater who represented Italy twice at the Winter Olympics.

== Career ==
Fontana began skating at age four. She began representing Italy in the 1993-94 season international competition. During her career, she won five national titles. She finished as high as 7th at the European Championships and 10th at Worlds. She finished 10th at the 2002 Winter Olympics in Salt Lake City. Following 2002, Fontana left competitive skating. She made a comeback in the 2005-06 season, hoping to skate at the Olympics in her home country of Italy. Her 2nd-place finish at the Italian Nationals qualified her for Italy's Olympic team. She placed 22nd in her final competitive event.

Following the Olympics, Fontana performed in ice shows around the world, as well as a skating competition on Italian TV. She coaches at TGH Ice Plex in Brandon, Florida with John Zimmerman. Their students include Haven Denney / Brandon Frazier. and currently Vanessa James / Morgan Ciprès.

== SafeSport investigation ==
In December 2019, Fontana and Zimmerman, were named and accused in a United States Center for SafeSport investigation of covering up alleged sexual abuse committed by Ciprès via intimidation tactics. Fontana received six months of probation, according to the person with knowledge of the investigation.

== Personal life ==
Fontana was born on Staten Island, New York, raised in Rome, and trained during her career in Hackensack, New Jersey.

Fontana married American pair skater John Zimmerman on August 28, 2003. The two coach together, and have served as ambassadors for Right to Play. The couple also have a line of sportswear, Karisma, which Fontana founded in 2009. They have representatives selling the clothing line in the United States, especially in the Midwest. Their daughter, Sofia Zimmerman, was born on April 2, 2012, at Northwest Medical Center in Coconut Creek, Florida. Their second daughter, Eva Zimmerman, was born on June 2, 2013, followed by their son Jack Zimmerman born in August 2016.

== Programs ==
Season	Short program	Free skating
2005–2006	Blues by C. Brown	Turandot by Giacomo Puccini performed by Vanessa-Mae; Nessun dorma by Giacomo Puccini
2001–2002	Histoire d'Amour by Carlos Almaran; Another Cha Cha by Santa Esmeralda; Mexico con Amor	Carmen by Georges Bizet
2000–2001	Flamenco by Otmar Liebert	Time to Say Goodbye by Andrea Boccelli

== Results ==
Results
International
Event	1992–93	1993–94	1995–96	1996–97	1997–98	1998–99	1999–00	2000–01	2001–02	2005–06
Olympics									10th	22nd
Worlds		25th	24th		18th	16th	19th	10th	10th	
Europeans		22nd	20th		18th	13th	8th	11th	7th	
GP Cup of Russia						11th	9th	9th		
GP Lalique								10th	7th	
GP Skate America						10th				
GP Skate Canada				7th			5th			
GP Sparkassen									7th	
Universiade								3rd		
Golden Spin of Zagreb										3rd
Italian Championships	2nd (Note: Information provided through personal correspondence from Cristina Mauri: "Nel 1993 io ho vinto il campionato Italiano a Roma. Seconda è arrivata Silvia Fontana e terza Vanessa Giunchi.")	1st	1st	3rd	2nd	1st	1st	2nd	1st	2nd
