= Caterina Gabanella =

Italian former competitive figure skater (born 1988)

Personal information
- Born: 11 September 1988 (age 37) Bolzano, Italy
- Height: 1.68 m (5 ft 6 in)

Figure skating career
- Country: Italy
- Skating club: Ice Club Bolzano
- Began skating: 1995
- Retired: 2006

Medal record
Italian Championships
Bronze medal – third place	2006 Sesto San Giovanni	Singles

Caterina Gabanella (born 11 September 1988) is an Italian former competitive figure skater. She is the 2005 Merano Cup bronze medalist and 2006 Italian national bronze medalist. She reached the free skate at the 2006 World Junior Championships and finished 17th overall.

== Programs ==
Season	Short program	Free skating
2005–06	Cuore Sacro by Andrea Guerra	Giselle by Adolphe Adam
2003–04	Music by Vicente Amigo, Symphonic Orchestra Barcelona choreo. by Roberto Pelizzola	Concerto No. 1 by Pyotr Ilyich Tchaikovsky choreo. by Roberto Pelizzola

== Competitive highlights ==
JGP: Junior Grand Prix

International
Event	2003–04	2004–05	2005–06
Merano Cup			3rd
International: Junior or novice
Junior Worlds			17th
JGP Bulgaria			8th
JGP Croatia	16th		
JGP Serbia		13th	
JGP Slovakia	13th		
Gardena		4th J.	
Merano Cup	1st J.		
National
Italian Champ.		9th	3rd
J. = Junior
