= Italian Figure Skating Championships =

- Status: Active
- Genre: National championships
- Frequency: Annual
- Country: Italy
- Inaugurated: 1914
- Organizer: Italian Ice Sports Federation

The Italian Figure Skating Championships (Italian: Campionati italiani di pattinaggio di figura) are an annual figure skating competition organized by the Italian Ice Sports Federation (Italian: Federazione Italiana Sport del Ghiaccio) to crown the national champions of Italy. The first Italian Championships were held in 1914 at the Lago di Ghirla and featured events for men and couples. The Italian Skating Federation, led by Count Alberto Bonacossa, was established shortly thereafter. Competitions were halted due to World War I, and in 1921, an event for women was added.

Medals are awarded in men's singles, women's singles, pair skating, and ice dance at the senior and junior levels, although each discipline may not necessarily be held every year due to a lack of participants. Alberto Bonacossa and Carlo Fassi are tied for winning the most Italian Championship titles in men's singles (with ten each); Fassi also holds the record in pair skating with his partner Grazia Barcellona (with nine). Carolina Kostner holds the record in women's singles (with nine), while Barbara Fusar-Poli and Maurizio Margaglio hold the record in ice dance (with nine), although Fusar-Poli won an additional title with a previous partner.

== History ==
The first figure skating competition for Italians took place in 1912 in St. Moritz, Switzerland, but the first Italian national championships were not held until 1914. The competition was held at the Lago di Ghirla, sponsored by the Varese Skating Club and La Gazzetta dello Sport, attended by skaters from Piedmont and Lombardy, and featured events for men and couples. Count Alberto Bonacossa won the men's event, and Dina Mancio-Kind and Adelchi Candellero won the pairs' event. The following year, the championships were held on Lake Valentino in Turin. Bonacossa again won the men's event, and Mancio-Kind again won the pairs' event, but this time with Gaspare Voli. Competitions were halted from 1916 to 1919 due to World War I, but after the war ended, new winter resorts developed in Trentino and South Tyrol. A championship event for women was added in 1921.

The Italian Skating Federation was established by Bonacossa in 1914. In September 1926, the skating federation merged with the ice hockey and bobsleigh federations to form the Italian Ice Sports Federation (Italian: Federazione Italiana Sport del Ghiaccio). Early competitions often featured events in both speed skating and figure skating. The Ice Palace (Italian: Palazzo del Ghiaccio) – the first artificial ice rink in Italy – was built in Milan in 1923. This allowed for skating competitions to be held that weren't dependent on the weather, as lakes and outdoor rinks needed to be sufficiently frozen for skaters to practice as well as compete. In 1933, the Italian Ice Sports Federation merged with the skiing federation to form the Italian Winter Sports Federation (Italian: Federazione Italiana Sport Invernali), and operations were transferred to Rome.

== Senior medalists ==
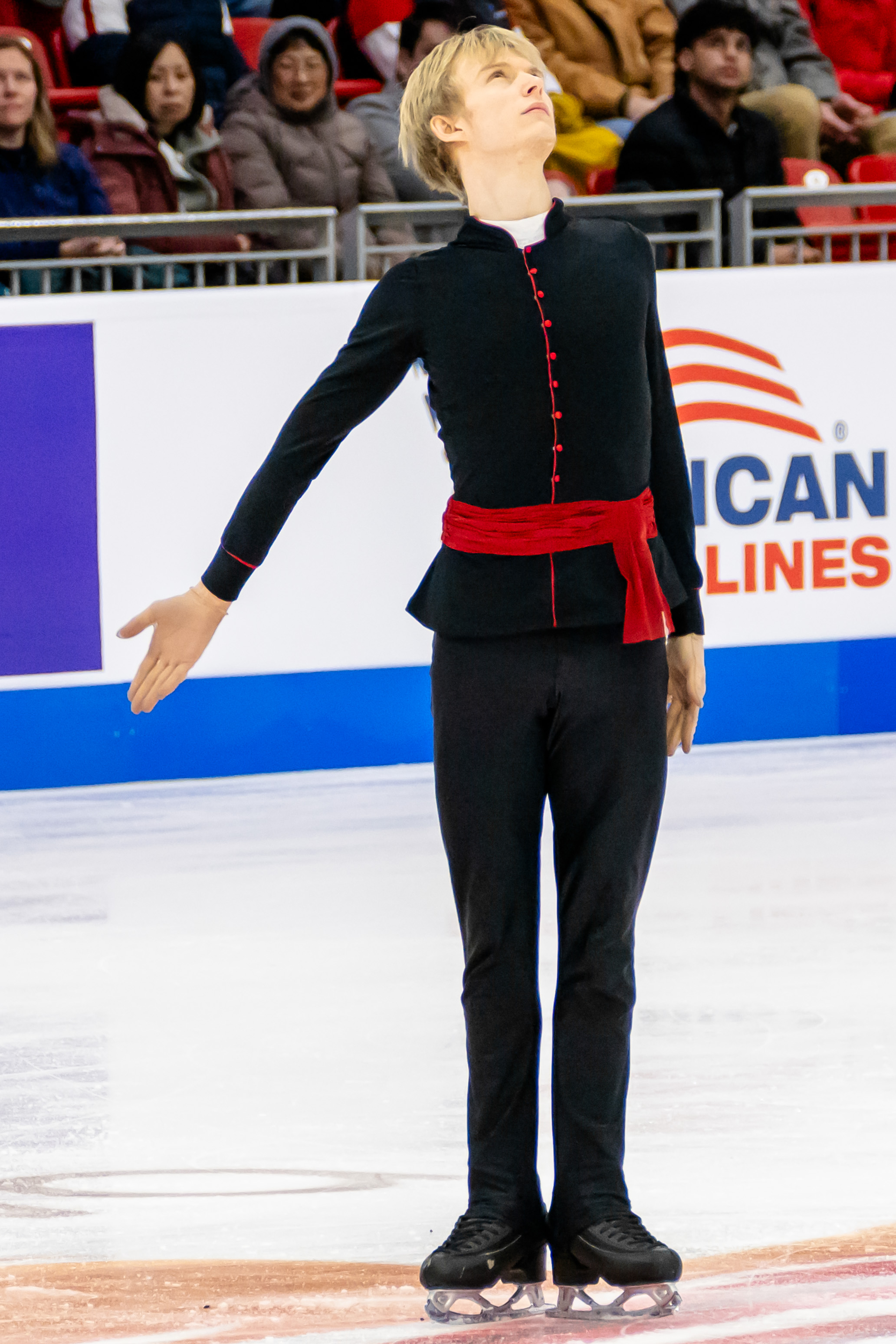
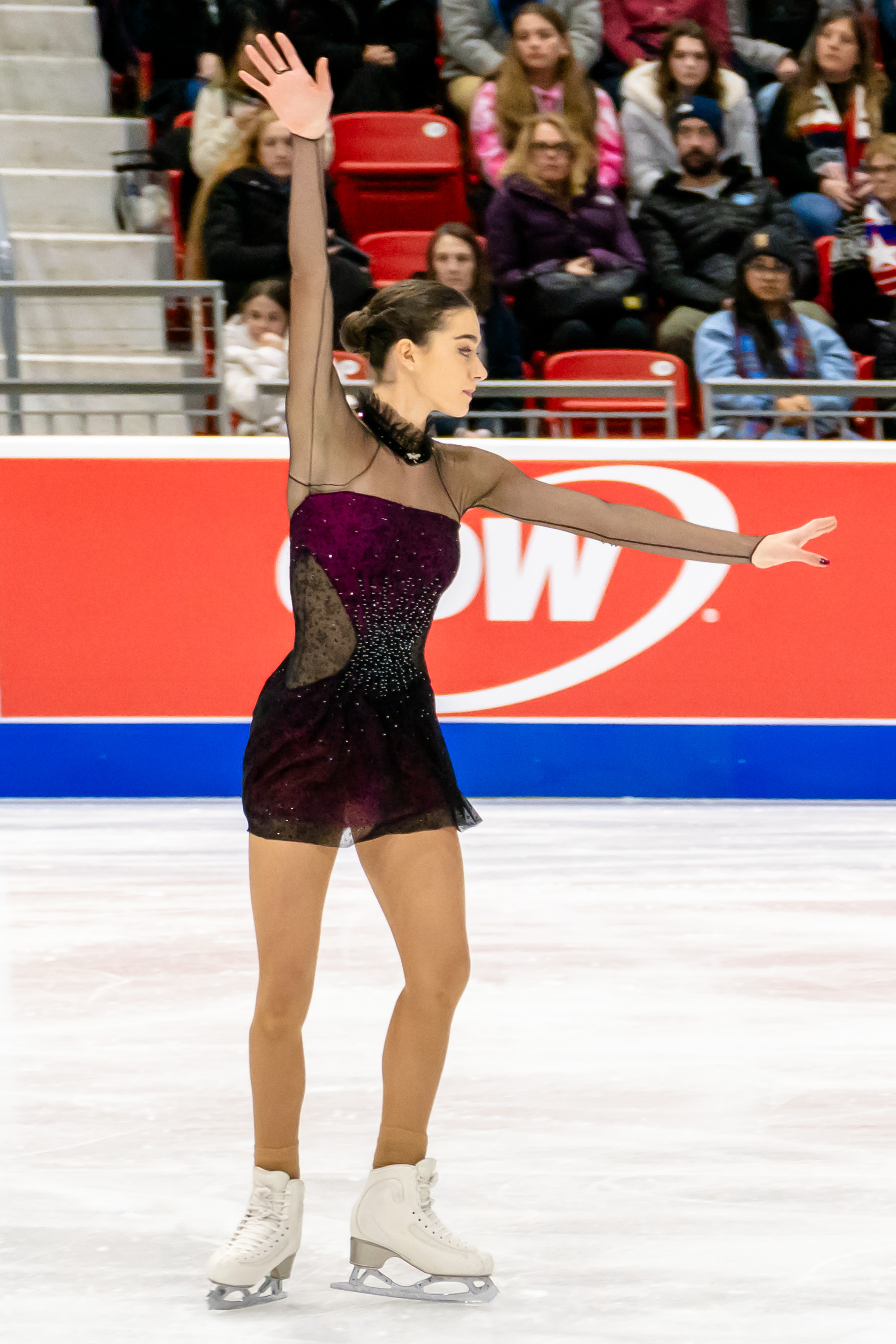
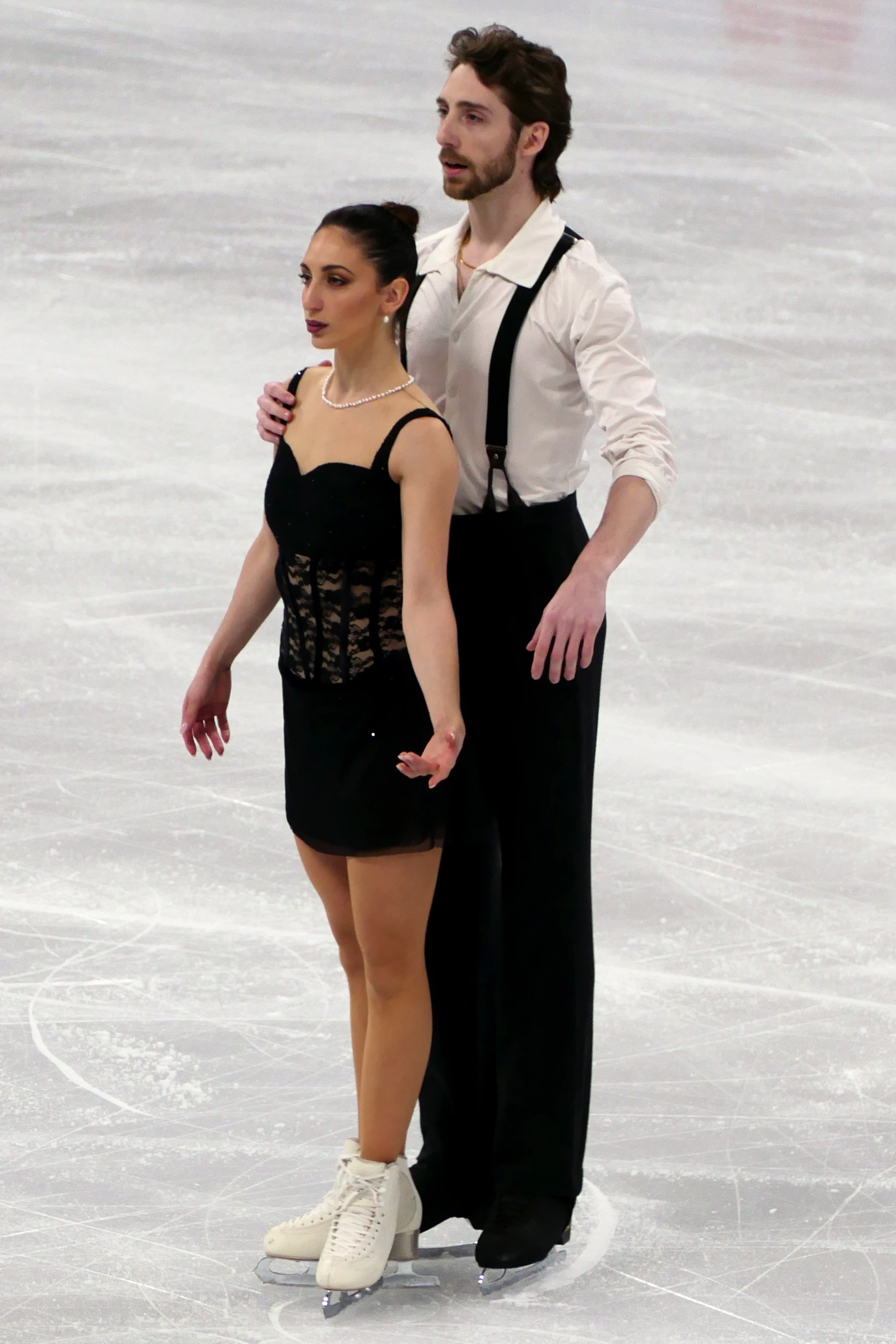
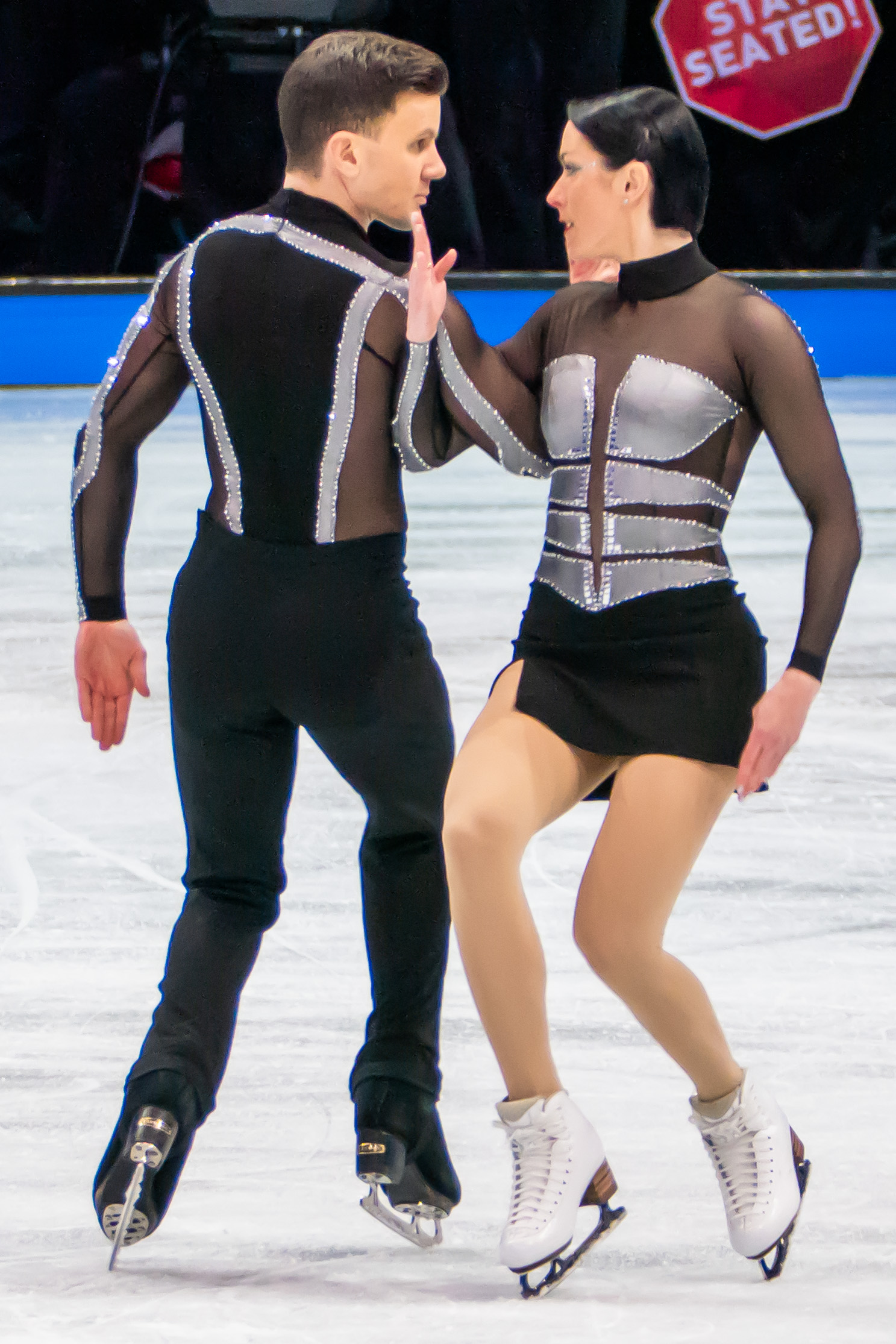
The reigning Italian figure skating champions (from left to right): Daniel Grassl (men's singles); Lara Naki Gutmann (women's singles); Sara Conti and Niccolò Macii (pair skating); and Charlène Guignard and Marco Fabbri (ice dance)

=== Men's singles ===
Filippo Dubini, the 1937 Italian champion, died in the Libyan campaign during World War II.

Senior men's event medalists
Year	Location	Gold	Silver	Bronze	Ref.
1914	Lago di Ghirla	Alberto Bonacossa	Adelchi Candellero	Angelo Bellani	
1915	Turin	Alberto Bonacossa	Adelchi Candellero	Angelo Bellani	
1916–19	No competitions due to World War I				
1920	Madesimo	Alberto Bonacossa	Signor Santagostino	Signor Zanacchi	
1921	Madesimo	Alberto Bonacossa	(No records found)		
1922	Milan	Alberto Bonacossa	Gino Colombo	Giovanni Vanni	
1923	Turin	Alberto Bonacossa	Adelchi Candellero	Giovanni Vanni	
1924	Milan	Alberto Bonacossa	Gino Colombo	Carlo Mangiagalli	
1925	Turin	Alberto Bonacossa	Carlo Mangiagalli	Signor De Luca	
1926	Milan	Alberto Bonacossa	Bruno Bonfiglio	Carlo Ciceri	
1927	Milan	No men's competitors			(Note: Alberto Bonacossa won ten men's championship titles; his last was in 1928.)
1928	Trentino	Alberto Bonacossa	Bruno Bonfiglio	No other competitors	
1929	No competition held				
1930	Cortina d'Ampezzo	Bruno Bonfiglio	No other competitors		
1931–32	Milan	No men's competitors			
1933	Milan	Mario Verdi	Vittorio Maggi	No other competitors	
1934	Cortina d'Ampezzo	Mario Verdi	Ferdinando Pernthaler	Vittorio Maggi	
1935	Cortina d'Ampezzo	Mario Verdi	Ercole Cattaneo	Pippo DeVecchi	
1936	Madonna di Campiglio	Ercole Cattaneo	Pippo DeVecchi	Albino Seppi	
1937	Milan	Filippo Dubini	Piero Balla	Guido Endrici	
1938	Milan	Ercole Cattaneo	Guido Endrici	No other competitors	
1939	Milan	Ercole Cattaneo	Guido Endrici	No other competitors	
1940	Milan	Ercole Cattaneo	Guido Endrici	No other competitors	
1941	Milan	Piero Talamona	Guido Endrici	Gianni De Mori	
1942	Milan	Gianni De Mori	Roberto Sartori	Guido Endrici	
1943	Milan	Carlo Fassi	Roberto Sartori	Guido Endrici	
1944-45	No competitions due to World War II				
1946	Milan	Carlo Fassi	Gianni De Mori	Roberto Sartori	
1947	Milan	Carlo Fassi	Gianni De Mori	Roberto Sartori	
1948	Milan	Carlo Fassi	Roberto Sartori	Bruno Benini	
1949	Merano	Carlo Fassi	Roberto Sartori	No other competitors	
1950	Cortina d'Ampezzo	Carlo Fassi	No other competitors		
1951	Asiago	Carlo Fassi	Giuliano Grossi	Giulio Radacovich	
1952	Sestriere	Carlo Fassi	Giulio Radacovich	Ezio Benini	
1953	Cortina d'Ampezzo	Carlo Fassi	(No records found)		
1954	Milan	Carlo Fassi	No other competitors		
1955	Turin	Roberto Rubino	No other competitors		
1956	Cortina d'Ampezzo	Sergio Bellè	(No records found)		(Note: Sergio Bellè won the men's championship title in 1956.)
1957	Cortina d'Ampezzo	Sergio Brosio	No other competitors		
1958	Milan	Sergio Brosio	(No records found)		
1959	Bolzano	Sergio Brosio	Corrado Maveri	Valter Agravio	
1960	Asiago	Sergio Brosio	No other competitors		
1961	Milan	Sergio Brosio	Giordano Abbondati	No other competitors	
1962	Milan	Giordano Abbondati	(No records found)		
1963	Bolzano	Giordano Abbondati	No other competitors		
1964	Milan	Giordano Abbondati	(No records found)		(Note: Giordano Abbondati won the men's championship titles from 1962 to 1968.)
1965	Milan	Giordano Abbondati	Stefano Bargauan	No other competitors	
1966	Cortina d'Ampezzo	Giordano Abbondati	Stefano Bargauan	No other competitors	
1967	Genoa	Giordano Abbondati	Stefano Bargauan	No other competitors	
1968	Milan	Giordano Abbondati	Stefano Bargauan	Willy Bargauan	
1969	Merano	Stefano Bargauan	Guido Sordelli	No other competitors	
1970	Milan	Stefano Bargauan	(No records found)		
1971	Ortisei	Stefano Bargauan	No other competitors		
1972	Milan	Stefano Bargauan	(No records found)		
1973	Milan	Stefano Bargauan	Rolando Bragaglia	No other competitors	
1974	Turin	Rolando Bragaglia	Stefano Bargauan	Willy Bargauan	
1975	Merano	Rolando Bragaglia	(No records found)		
1976	Bolzano	Rolando Bragaglia	No other competitors		
1977–80	No men's competitors				
1981	Milan	Bruno Delmaestro	(No records found)		(Note: Bruno Delmaestro won the men's championship titles from 1981 to 1983.)
1982	Savona	Bruno Delmaestro	(No records found)		(Note: Bruno Delmaestro won the men's championship titles from 1981 to 1983.)
1983	Milan	Bruno Delmaestro	(No records found)		(Note: Bruno Delmaestro won the men's championship titles from 1981 to 1983.)
1984	Ortisei	Alessandro Riccitelli	(No records found)		(Note: Alessandro Riccitelli won the men's championship titles from 1984 to 1991.)
1985	Belluno	Alessandro Riccitelli	(No records found)		(Note: Alessandro Riccitelli won the men's championship titles from 1984 to 1991.)
1986	Aosta	Alessandro Riccitelli	No other competitors		
1987	Mentana	Alessandro Riccitelli	Moreno Inzaghi	Albert Giaquinta	
1988	Belluno	Alessandro Riccitelli	(No records found)		
1989	Bressanone	Alessandro Riccitelli	(No records found)		
1990	(No records found)	Alessandro Riccitelli	Massimo Salvade	(No records found)	
1991	Feltre	Gilberto Viadana	(No records found)		
1992	Milan	Gilberto Viadana	(No records found)		
1993	Rome	Fabrizio Garattoni	Gilberto Viadana	(No records found)	
1994	(No records found)	Fabrizio Garattoni	Gilberto Viadana	(No records found)	(Note: Fabrizio Garattoni won the men's championship titles in 1993 and 1994.)
1995	Rome	Fabrizio Garattoni	Gilberto Viadana	(No records found)	
1996	(No records found)	Fabrizio Garattoni	Gilberto Viadana	Angelo Dolfini	
1997	Roccaraso	Gilberto Viadana	Fabrizio Garattoni	Angelo Dolfini	
1998	Courmayeur	Gilberto Viadana	Angelo Dolfini	Roberto Sana	
1999	Milan	Angelo Dolfini	Roberto Sana	No other competitors	
2000	Merano	Angelo Dolfini	Karel Zelenka	No other competitors	
2001	Milan	Angelo Dolfini	Karel Zelenka	No other competitors	
2002	Collalbo	Angelo Dolfini	Karel Zelenka	Paolo Bacchini	
2003	Lecco	Karel Zelenka	Paolo Bacchini	Fabio Mascarello	
2004	Milan	Karel Zelenka	Paolo Bacchini	Marco Fabbri	
2005	Merano	Karel Zelenka	Paolo Bacchini	Marco Fabbri	
2006	Sesto San Giovanni	Karel Zelenka	Paolo Bacchini	Daniel D'Inca	
2007	Trento	Karel Zelenka	Marco Fabbri	Paolo Bacchini	
2008	Milan	Samuel Contesti	Karel Zelenka	Paolo Bacchini	
2009	Pinerolo	Samuel Contesti	Paolo Bacchini	Ruben Errampalli	
2010	Brescia	Samuel Contesti	Paolo Bacchini	Karel Zelenka	
2011	Milan	Samuel Contesti	Paolo Bacchini	Fabio Mascarello	
2012	Courmayeur	Samuel Contesti	Paolo Bacchini	Paul Bonifacio Parkinson	
2013	Milan	Paul Bonifacio Parkinson	Paolo Bacchini	Maurizio Zandron	
2014	Merano	Ivan Righini	Paul Bonifacio Parkinson	Paolo Bacchini	
2015	Turin	Ivan Righini	Matteo Rizzo	Carlo Vittorio Palermo	
2016	Turin	Ivan Righini	Matteo Rizzo	Maurizio Zandron	
2017	Egna	Ivan Righini	Matteo Rizzo	Maurizio Zandron	
2018	Milan	Matteo Rizzo	Ivan Righini	Maurizio Zandron	
2019	Trento	Daniel Grassl	Matteo Rizzo	Mattia Dalla Torre	
2020	Bergamo	Daniel Grassl	Matteo Rizzo	Mattia Dalla Torre	
2021	Egna	Daniel Grassl	Matteo Rizzo	Gabriele Frangipani	
2022	Turin	Daniel Grassl	Matteo Rizzo	Gabriele Frangipani	
2023	Brunico	Matteo Rizzo	Nikolaj Memola	Gabriele Frangipani	
2024	Pinerolo	Nikolaj Memola	Gabriele Frangipani	Corey Circelli	
2025	Varese	Daniel Grassl	Nikolaj Memola	Gabriele Frangipani	
2026	Bergamo	Daniel Grassl	Matteo Rizzo	Corey Circelli	

=== Women's singles ===
Rita Trapanese, seven-time Italian national champion from 1966 to 1972, died in an automobile accident in 2000 near Gattatico. The Rita Trapanese Trophy (Italian: Trofeo Rita Trapanese) is named in her honor, and is occasionally held as part of the ISU Junior Grand Prix of Figure Skating series.

Senior women's event medalists
Year	Location	Gold	Silver	Bronze	Ref.
1921	Madesimo	Marisa Bonacossa	(No records found)		
1922	Milan	Marisa Bonacossa	Mimi Merati	Rosetta Gagliardi	
1923	Turin	Marisa Bonacossa	Sandra Franchi	Margherita Weidlich	
1924	Milan	Marisa Bonacossa	Mimi Merati	Margherita Weidlich	
1925	Turin	Sandra Franchi	Margherita Weidlich	Marisa Bonacossa	
1926	Milan	Marisa Bonacossa	Irene Volpato	Anna Cattaneo (née Dubini)	
1927	Milan	Marisa Bonacossa	(No records found)		(Note: Marisa Bonacossa won seven women's championship titles between 1921 and 1928. She did not win the title in 1925.)
1928	Trentino	Marisa Bonacossa	No other competitors		
1929	No competition held				
1930	Cortina d'Ampezzo	Irene Volpato	No other competitors		
1931	Milan	Irene Volpato	No other competitors		
1932	Milan	Irene Volpato	No other competitors		
1933	Milan	Irene Volpato	No other competitors		
1934	Cortina d'Ampezzo	Giovanna Foschini	Erica Bianchi	No other competitors	
1935	Cortina d'Ampezzo	Anna Cattaneo	Leila Bottini	No other competitors	
1936	Madonna di Campiglio	Anna Cattaneo	No other competitors		
1937	Milan	Lidia Schid	Erica Bianchi	Anna Maria Celotti	
1938	Milan	Anna Cattaneo	Leila Bottini	Costanza Vigorelli	
1939	Milan	Costanza Vigorelli	Anna Maria Celotti	No other competitors	
1940	Milan	Costanza Vigorelli	Mara Combi	Carla Bellinzona	
1941	Milan	Costanza Vigorelli	Anna Combi	Carla Bellinzona	
1942	Milan	Mara Combi	Carla Bellinzona	Fedora Nuremberg	
1943	Milan	Costanza Vigorelli	Carla Bellinzona	Fedora Nuremberg	
1944-45	No competitions due to World War II				
1946	Milan	Costanza Vigorelli	Carla Bellinzona	Grazia Barcellona	
1947	Milan	Costanza Vigorelli	Grazia Barcellona	Fedora Nuremberg	
1948	Milan	Grazia Barcellona	Angiolamaria Azria	Liliana Aquilano	
1949	Merano	Grazia Barcellona	Franca Re	Liliana Aquilano	
1950	Cortina d'Ampezzo	Grazia Barcellona	Franca Re	Liliana Aquilano	
1951	Asiago	Grazia Barcellona	Franca Re	Liliana Aquilano	
1952	Sestriere	Grazia Barcellona	Liliana Aquilano	Didi Manzoli	
1953	Cortina d'Ampezzo	Fiorella Negro	Franca Tininini	(No records found)	
1954	Milan	Fiorella Negro	Luisella Gasperi	Manuela Angeli	
1955	Turin	Fiorella Negro	Emma Giardini	Luisella Gasperi	
1956	Cortina d'Ampezzo	Fiorella Negro	Manuela Angeli	Emma Giardini	
1957	Cortina d'Ampezzo	Emma Giardini	Anna Galmarini	Marina D'Agata	
1958	Milan	Carla Tichatschek	Anna Galmarini	No other competitors	
1959	Bolzano	Carla Tichatschek	Anna Galmarini	Maria Boscato	
1960	Asiago	Anna Galmarini	Carla Tichatschek	Maria Boscato	
1961	Milan	Christa Fassi	Silvana Saccozzi	Maria Boscato	
1962	Milan	Sandra Brugnera	(No records found)		
1963	Bolzano	Sandra Brugnera	Susanna Carpani	Rosanna Rossi	
1964	Milan	Sandra Brugnera	(No records found)		(Note: Sandra Brugnera won the women's championship titles from 1962 to 1965.)
1965	Milan	Sandra Brugnera	Rita Trapanese	Susanna Carpani	
1966	Cortina d'Ampezzo	Rita Trapanese	Susanna Carpani	Giuliana Chiussi	
1967	Genoa	Rita Trapanese	Giuliana Chiussi	Maria Sordelli	
1968	Milan	Rita Trapanese	(No records found)		(Note: Rita Trapanese won the women's championship titles from 1966 to 1972.)
1969	Merano	Rita Trapanese	Cinzia Frosio	Melitta Donà	
1970	Milan	Rita Trapanese	Cinzia Frosio	(No records found)	
1971	Ortisei	Rita Trapanese	Cinzia Frosio	Raffaella Locatelli	
1972	Milan	Rita Trapanese	Cinzia Frosio	Manuela Bertelè	
1973	Milan	Cinzia Frosio	Manuela Bertelè	(No records found)	
1974	Turin	Cinzia Frosio	Manuela Bertelè	Franca Bianconi	
1975	Merano	Susanna Driano	(No records found)		(Note: Susanna Driano won the women's championship titles from 1975 to 1976, and from 1978 to 1980.)
1976	Bolzano	Susanna Driano	Franca Bianconi	Catia Seretti	
1977	Merano	Franca Bianconi	Michaela Schrott	Signorina Ferretti	
1978	(No records found)	Susanna Driano	Franca Bianconi	Patrizia Fiorucci	
1979	Milan	Susanna Driano	Franca Bianconi	(No records found)	
1980	(No records found)	Susanna Driano	Maristella Maderna	(No records found)	
1981	Milan	Karin Telser	Franca Bianconi	(No records found)	
1982	Savona	Karin Telser	(No records found)		
1983	Milan	Karin Telser	(No records found)		
1984	Ortisei	Karin Telser	(No records found)		
1985	Belluno	Paola Tosi	Beatrice Gelmini	(No records found)	
1986	Aosta	Beatrice Gelmini	Pinuccia Ferrario	No other competitors	
1987	Mentana	Beatrice Gelmini	Paola Tosi	Sabine Contini	
1988	Belluno	Beatrice Gelmini	Sabine Contini	Paola Tosi	
1989	Bressanone	Sabine Contini	Beatrice Gelmini	Paola Tosi	
1990	(No records found)	Beatrice Gelmini	Paola Tosi	(No records found)	
1991	Feltre	Sabine Contini	Beatrice Gelmini	(No records found)	
1992	Milan	Margaret Schlater	Cristina Mauri	(No records found)	(Note: Margaret Schlater won the women's championship title in 1992.)
1993	Rome	Cristina Mauri	Silvia Fontana	Vanessa Giunchi	(Note: Information provided through personal correspondence from Cristina Mauri: "Nel 1993 io ho vinto il campionato Italiano a Roma. Seconda è arrivata Silvia Fontana e terza Vanessa Giunchi.")
1994	(No records found)	Silvia Fontana	Vanessa Giunchi	(No records found)	
1995	Rome	Vanessa Giunchi	(No records found)		
1996	(No records found)	Silvia Fontana	Vanessa Giunchi	(No records found)	
1997	Roccaraso	Tony Bombardieri	Vanessa Giunchi	Silvia Fontana	
1998	Courmayeur	Tony Bombardieri	Silvia Fontana	Vanessa Giunchi	
1999	Milan	Silvia Fontana	Vanessa Giunchi	Elisa Pompanin	
2000	Merano	Silvia Fontana	Vanessa Giunchi	Paola Pasetto	
2001	Milan	Vanessa Giunchi	Silvia Fontana	Claudia di Constanzo	
2002	Collalbo	Silvia Fontana	Vanessa Giunchi	Claudia di Constanzo	
2003	Lecco	Carolina Kostner	Vanessa Giunchi	Giorgia Carrossa	
2004	Milan	Valentina Marchei	Carolina Kostner	Martina Sasanelli	
2005	Merano	Carolina Kostner	Valentina Marchei	Nicole Della Monica	
2006	Sesto San Giovanni	Carolina Kostner	Silvia Fontana	Caterina Gabanella	
2007	Trento	Carolina Kostner	Stefania Berton	Valentina Marchei	
2008	Milan	Valentina Marchei	Stefania Berton	Francesca Rio	
2009	Pinerolo	Carolina Kostner	Francesca Rio	Stefania Berton	
2010	Brescia	Valentina Marchei	Carolina Kostner	Alice Garlisi	
2011	Milan	Carolina Kostner	Valentina Marchei	Amelia Schwienbacher	
2012	Courmayeur	Valentina Marchei	Francesca Rio	Roberta Rodeghiero	
2013	Milan	Carolina Kostner	Valentina Marchei	Giada Russo	
2014	Merano	Valentina Marchei	Francesca Rio	Roberta Rodeghiero	
2015	Turin	Giada Russo	Roberta Rodeghiero	Micol Cristini	
2016	Turin	Giada Russo	Roberta Rodeghiero	Sara Casella	
2017	Egna	Carolina Kostner	Roberta Rodeghiero	Giada Russo	
2018	Milan	Carolina Kostner	Giada Russo	Elisabetta Leccardi	
2019	Trento	Alessia Tornaghi	Lucrezia Beccari	Lara Naki Gutmann	
2020	Bergamo	Alessia Tornaghi	Marina Piredda	Lara Naki Gutmann	
2021	Egna	Lara Naki Gutmann	Ginevra Lavinia Negrello	Lucrezia Beccari	
2022	Turin	Lara Naki Gutmann	Anna Pezzetta	Marina Piredda	
2023	Brunico	Lara Naki Gutmann	Ginevra Lavinia Negrello	Anna Pezzetta	
2024	Pinerolo	Sarina Joos	Lara Naki Gutmann	Anna Pezzetta	
2025	Varese	Anna Pezzetta	Lara Naki Gutmann	Marina Piredda	
2026	Bergamo	Lara Naki Gutmann	Sarina Joos	Ginevra Lavinia Negrello	

=== Pairs ===
Senior pairs event medalists
Year	Location	Gold	Silver	Bronze	Ref.
1914	Lago di Ghirla	Dina Mancio-Kind; Adelchi Candellero	Signorina Frua; Angelo Bellani	No other competitors	
1915	Turin	Dina Mancio-Kind; Gaspare Voli	No other competitors		
1916–19	No competitions due to World War I				
1920	Madesimo	Marisa Bonacossa; Alberto Bonacossa	No other competitors		
1921	Madesimo	Marisa Bonacossa; Alberto Bonacossa	(No records found)		
1922	Milan	Marisa Bonacossa; Alberto Bonacossa	Rosetta Gagliardi; Giovanni Vanni	Mimi Merati; Gino Colombo	
1923	Turin	Dina Mancio-Kind; Gaspare Voli	Margherita Weidlich; Giovanni Vanni	No other competitors	
1924	Milan	Margherita Weidlich; Giovanni Vanni	Mimi Merati; Gino Colombo	Remigia Cusini; Leonardo Bonzi	
1925	Turin	Dina Mancio-Kind; Gaspare Voli	No other competitors		
1926	Milan	Irene Volpato; Bruno Bonfiglio	No other competitors		
1927	Milan	(No records found)			
1928	Trentino	No pairs competitors			
1929	No competition held				
1930	Cortina d'Ampezzo	Irene Volpato; Bruno Bonfiglio	No other competitors		
1931	Milan	No pairs competitors			
1932	Milan	Sandra Franchi; Signor Mazzoni	No other competitors		
1933	Milan	Leila Bottini; Vittorio Maggi	No other competitors		
1934	Cortina d'Ampezzo	Leila Bottini; Vittorio Maggi	No other competitors		
1935	Cortina d'Ampezzo	Leila Bottini; Vittorio Maggi	Signorina Andreaus; Signor Blaha	Paola Seppi; Albino Seppi	
1936	Madonna di Campiglio	Anna Cattaneo; Ercole Cattaneo	Paola Seppi; Albino Seppi	No other competitors	
1937	Milan	Paola Seppi; Albino Seppi	Anna Maria Celotti; Piero Balla	Signorina Sincero; Camillo Patruno	
1938	Milan	Anna Cattaneo; Ercole Cattaneo	Leila Bottini; Vittorio Maggi	Anna Maria Celotti; Piero Balla	
1939	Milan	Anna Cattaneo; Ercole Cattaneo	Signorina Blaha; Signor Blaha	No other competitors	
1940	Milan	Anna Cattaneo; Ercole Cattaneo	No other competitors		
1941	Milan	Anna Combi; Gianni De Mori	No other competitors		
1942	Milan	Grazia Barcellona; Carlo Fassi	Carla Fontana; Gianni De Mori	No other competitors	
1943	Milan	Grazia Barcellona; Carlo Fassi	No other competitors		
1944–45	No competitions due to World War II				
1946	Milan	Grazia Barcellona; Carlo Fassi	No other competitors		
1947	Milan	Grazia Barcellona; Carlo Fassi	No other competitors		
1948	Milan	Grazia Barcellona; Carlo Fassi	Rosalia Piantella; Piero Barresi	No other competitors	
1949	Merano	Grazia Barcellona; Carlo Fassi	No other competitors		
1950	Cortina d'Ampezzo	Grazia Barcellona; Carlo Fassi	No other competitors		
1951	Asiago	Grazia Barcellona; Carlo Fassi	Luciana Maffatti; Giuliano Grossi	No other competitors	
1952	Sestriere	Luciana Malfatti; Gianni De Mori	No other competitors		
1953	Cortina d'Ampezzo	Luciana Malfatti; Gianni De Mori	Maria Losco; Ezio Benini	No other competitors	
1954	Milan	Grazia Barcellona; Carlo Fassi	No other competitors		
1955	Turin	Bona Giammona; Giancarlo Sioli	Rosalia Piantella; Aldo Burdet	No other competitors	
1956–58	No pairs competitors				
1959	Bolzano	Cristina Rieder; Valter Adrario	No other competitors		
1960	Asiago	Ilvana Zuliana; Roberto Castoldi	No other competitors		
1961–63	No pairs competitors				
1964	Milan	Emanuela Gianoli; Michele Bargauan	(No records found)		(Note: Emanuela Gianoli and Michele Bargauan won the pairs championship title in 1964.)
1965	Milan	Emanuela Gianoli; Michele Bargauan	No other competitors		
1966	Cortina d'Ampezzo	Emanuela Gianoli; Michele Bargauan	No other competitors		
1967	Genoa	Emanuela Gianoli; Michele Bargauan	No other competitors		
1968–69	No pairs competitors				
1970	Milan	(No records found)			
1971	Ortisei	No pairs competitors			
1972	Milan	(No records found)			
1973	Milan	(No records found)			
1974	Turin	No pairs competitors			
1975	Merano	(No records found)			
1976	Bolzano	No pairs competitors			
1977	Merano	(No records found)			
1978	(No records found)	No pairs competitors			
1979	Milan	(No records found)			
1980	(No records found)	(No records found)			
1981	No pairs competitors				
1982	Savona	(No records found)			
1983	Milan	No pairs competitors			
1984	Ortisei	(No records found)			
1985	Belluno	(No records found)			
1986–88	No pairs competitors				
1989	Bressanone	(No records found)			
1990	(No records found)	(No records found)			
1991	Feltre	Anna Tabacchi; Massimo Salvadè	No other competitors		
1992	Milan	Anna Tabacchi; Massimo Salvadè	(No records found)		
1993	Rome	(No records found)			
1994	(No records found)	Marta Andrella; Dmitri Kaploun	(No records found)		
1995	Rome	Marta Andrella; Dmitri Kaploun	(No records found)		
1996	(No records found)	Inga Rodionova; Claudio Fico	(No records found)		
1997	Roccaraso	(No records found)			
1998	Courmayeur	Elisa Carenini; Ruben De Pra	Silvia Vian; Andrea Livi	No other competitors	
1999–2000	No pairs competitors				
2001	Milan	Michela Cobisi; Ruben De Pra	No other competitors		
2002	Collalbo	Michela Cobisi; Ruben De Pra	No other competitors		
2003–06	No pairs competitors				
2007	Trento	Laura Magitteri; Ondřej Hotárek	No other competitors		
2008	Milan	Laura Magitteri; Ondřej Hotárek	Marika Zanforlin; Federico Degli Esposti	No other competitors	
2009	Pinerolo	Nicole Della Monica; Yannick Kocon	Marika Zanforlin; Federico Degli Esposti	Laura Magitteri; Ondřej Hotárek	
2010	Brescia	Nicole Della Monica; Yannick Kocon	Stefania Berton; Ondřej Hotárek	Marika Zanforlin; Federico Degli Esposti	
2011	Milan	Stefania Berton; Ondřej Hotárek	No other competitors		
2012	Courmayeur	Stefania Berton; Ondřej Hotárek	Carolina Gillespie; Luca Demattè	No other competitors	
2013	Milan	Stefania Berton; Ondřej Hotárek	Nicole Della Monica; Matteo Guarise	No other competitors	
2014	Merano	Stefania Berton; Ondřej Hotárek	Nicole Della Monica; Matteo Guarise	Giulia Foresti; Luca Demattè	
2015	Turin	Valentina Marchei; Ondřej Hotárek	Nicole Della Monica; Matteo Guarise	Alessandra Cernuschi; Filippo Ambrosini	
2016	Turin	Nicole Della Monica; Matteo Guarise	Valentina Marchei; Ondřej Hotárek	Bianca Manacorda; Niccolò Macii	
2017	Egna	Nicole Della Monica; Matteo Guarise	Valentina Marchei; Ondřej Hotárek	Rebecca Ghilardi; Filippo Ambrosini	
2018	Milan	Nicole Della Monica; Matteo Guarise	Valentina Marchei; Ondřej Hotárek	Rebecca Ghilardi; Filippo Ambrosini	
2019	Trento	Nicole Della Monica; Matteo Guarise	Rebecca Ghilardi; Filippo Ambrosini	No other competitors	
2020	Bergamo	Nicole Della Monica; Matteo Guarise	Rebecca Ghilardi; Filippo Ambrosini	Sara Conti; Niccolò Macii	
2021	Egna	Nicole Della Monica; Matteo Guarise	Rebecca Ghilardi; Filippo Ambrosini	Sara Conti; Niccolò Macii	
2022	Turin	Nicole Della Monica; Matteo Guarise	Rebecca Ghilardi; Filippo Ambrosini	Sara Conti; Niccolò Macii	
2023	Brunico	Sara Conti; Niccolò Macii	Rebecca Ghilardi; Filippo Ambrosini	Lucrezia Beccari; Matteo Guarise	
2024	Pinerolo	Rebecca Ghilardi; Filippo Ambrosini	Lucrezia Beccari; Matteo Guarise	Anna Valesi; Manuel Piazza	
2025	Varese	Sara Conti; Niccolò Macii	Rebecca Ghilardi; Filippo Ambrosini	Irma Caldara; Riccardo Maglio	
2026	Bergamo	Sara Conti; Niccolò Macii	Rebecca Ghilardi; Filippo Ambrosini	Irma Caldara; Riccardo Maglio	

=== Ice dance ===
Senior ice dance event medalists
Year	Location	Gold	Silver	Bronze	Ref.
1970	Milan	Matilde Ciccia; Lamberto Ceserani	Paola Mezzadri; Sergio Pirelli	Roberta Conca; Walter Zuccara	
1971	Milan	Matilde Ciccia; Lamberto Ceserani	Stefania Bertelè; Walter Cecconi	Marina Massen; Corrado Volpi	
1972	Milan	Matilde Ciccia; Lamberto Ceserani	(No records found)		(Note: Matilde Ciccia and Lamberto Ceserani won the ice dance championship titles from 1969 to 1976.)
1973	Milan	Matilde Ciccia; Lamberto Ceserani	(No records found)		(Note: Matilde Ciccia and Lamberto Ceserani won the ice dance championship titles from 1969 to 1976.)
1974	Milan	Matilde Ciccia; Lamberto Ceserani	Isabella Rizzi; Luigi Freroni	Elisabetta Parisi; Marco Gobbo	
1975	Merano	Matilde Ciccia; Lamberto Ceserani	(No records found)		
1976	Bolzano	Matilde Ciccia; Lamberto Ceserani	(No records found)		
1977	Merano	Isabella Rizzi; Luigi Freroni	(No records found)		
1978	(No records found)	Stefania Bertelè; Walter Cecconi	Isabella Rizzi; Luigi Freroni	(No records found)	
1979	Milan	Isabella Rizzi; Luigi Freroni	(No records found)		
1980	(No records found)	Paola Casalotti; Sergio Ceserani	(No records found)		
1981	Milan	Marilena Medea; Luigi Freroni	(No records found)		
1982	Savona	Isabella Micheli; Roberto Pelizzola	(No records found)		
1983	Milan	Isabella Micheli; Roberto Pelizzola	(No records found)		
1984	Ortisei	Isabella Micheli; Roberto Pelizzola	(No records found)		
1985	Belluno	Isabella Micheli; Roberto Pelizzola	(No records found)		
1986	Aosta	Isabella Micheli; Roberto Pelizzola	Stefania Calegari; Pasquale Camerlengo	Tania Capiello; Gian Piero Tiranzoni	
1987	Mentana	Lia Trovati; Roberto Pelizzola	Michela Malingambi; Andrea Gilardi	Stefania Calegari; Pasquale Camerlengo	
1988	Belluno	Lia Trovati; Roberto Pelizzola	Stefania Calegari; Pasquale Camerlengo	(No records found)	
1989	Bressanone	Anna Croci; Luca Mantovani	Stefania Calegari; Pasquale Camerlengo	(No records found)	
1990	(No records found)	Anna Croci; Luca Mantovani	Stefania Calegari; Pasquale Camerlengo	(No records found)	
1991	Feltre	Anna Croci; Luca Mantovani	Michela Cesare; Carlo Soave	Laura Bonardi; Alessandro Reani	
1992	Milan	Stefania Calegari; Pasquale Camerlengo	(No records found)		
1993	Rome	Stefania Calegari; Pasquale Camerlengo	Barbara Fusar-Poli; Alberto Reani	(No records found)	
1994	(No records found)	Barbara Fusar-Poli; Alberto Reani	Laura Bonardi; Alessandro Reani	(No records found)	
1995	Rome	Barbara Fusar-Poli; Maurizio Margaglio	Francesca Fermi; Andrea Baldi	(No records found)	
1996	(No records found)	Barbara Fusar-Poli; Maurizio Margaglio	Francesca Fermi; Andrea Baldi	(No records found)	
1997	Roccaraso	Barbara Fusar-Poli; Maurizio Margaglio	Diane Gerencser; Pasquale Camerlengo	Francesca Fermi; Andrea Baldi	
1998	Courmayeur	Barbara Fusar-Poli; Maurizio Margaglio	Diane Gerencser; Pasquale Camerlengo	No other competitors	
1999	Milan	Barbara Fusar-Poli; Maurizio Margaglio	Francesca Fermi; Diego Rinaldi	Elisa Angeli; Moreno La Fiosca	
2000	Merano	Barbara Fusar-Poli; Maurizio Margaglio	Federica Faiella; Luciano Milo	No other competitors	
2001	Milan	Barbara Fusar-Poli; Maurizio Margaglio	Valentina Anselmi; Fabrizio Pedrazzini	Gloria Agogliati; Luciano Milo	
2002	Milan	Barbara Fusar-Poli; Maurizio Margaglio	Federica Faiella; Massimo Scali	Valentina Anselmi; Fabrizio Pedrazzini	
2003	Lecco	Federica Faiella; Massimo Scali	Marta Paoletti; Fabrizio Pedrazzini	No other competitors	
2004	Milan	Federica Faiella; Massimo Scali	Alessia Aureli; Andrea Vaturi	Alessia Avanzini; Luca Lombardi	
2005	Merano	Federica Faiella; Massimo Scali	Alessia Aureli; Andrea Vaturi	No other competitors	
2006	Sesto San Giovanni	Barbara Fusar-Poli; Maurizio Margaglio	Federica Faiella; Massimo Scali	Alessia Aureli; Andrea Vaturi	
2007	Trento	Federica Faiella; Massimo Scali	Anna Cappellini; Luca Lanotte	No other competitors	
2008	Milan	Federica Faiella; Massimo Scali	Anna Cappellini; Luca Lanotte	Alessia Aureli; Marco Garavaglia	
2009	Pinerolo	Federica Faiella; Massimo Scali	Anna Cappellini; Luca Lanotte	Isabella Pajardi; Stefano Caruso	
2010	Brescia	Federica Faiella; Massimo Scali	Anna Cappellini; Luca Lanotte	Federica Testa; Christopher Mior	
2011	Milan	Federica Testa; Christopher Mior	Charlène Guignard; Marco Fabbri	Lorenza Alessandrini; Simone Vaturi	
2012	Courmayeur	Anna Cappellini; Luca Lanotte	Charlène Guignard; Marco Fabbri	Lorenza Alessandrini; Simone Vaturi	
2013	Milan	Anna Cappellini; Luca Lanotte	Charlène Guignard; Marco Fabbri	Federica Bernardi; Christopher Mior	
2014	Merano	Anna Cappellini; Luca Lanotte	Charlène Guignard; Marco Fabbri	Lorenza Alessandrini; Simone Vaturi	
2015	Turin	Anna Cappellini; Luca Lanotte	Charlène Guignard; Marco Fabbri	Misato Komatsubara; Andrea Fabbri	
2016	Turin	Anna Cappellini; Luca Lanotte	Charlène Guignard; Marco Fabbri	Misato Komatsubara; Andrea Fabbri	
2017	Egna	Anna Cappellini; Luca Lanotte	Charlène Guignard; Marco Fabbri	Jasmine Tessari; Francesco Fioretti	
2018	Milan	Anna Cappellini; Luca Lanotte	Charlène Guignard; Marco Fabbri	Jasmine Tessari; Francesco Fioretti	
2019	Trento	Charlène Guignard; Marco Fabbri	Jasmine Tessari; Francesco Fioretti	Carolina Moscheni; Andrea Fabbri	
2020	Bergamo	Charlène Guignard; Marco Fabbri	Jasmine Tessari; Francesco Fioretti	Katrine Roy; Claudio Pietrantonio	
2021	Egna	Charlène Guignard; Marco Fabbri	Carolina Moscheni; Francesco Fioretti	Chiara Calderone; Francesco Riva	
2022	Turin	Charlène Guignard; Marco Fabbri	Carolina Moscheni; Francesco Fioretti	Elisabetta Leccardi; Mattia Dalla Torre	
2023	Brunico	Charlène Guignard; Marco Fabbri	Victoria Manni; Carlo Röthlisberger	Carolina Portesi Peroni; Michael Chrastecky	
2024	Pinerolo	Charlène Guignard; Marco Fabbri	Victoria Manni; Carlo Röthlisberger	Leia Dozzi; Pietro Papetti	
2025	Varese	Charlène Guignard; Marco Fabbri	Victoria Manni; Carlo Röthlisberger	Leia Dozzi; Pietro Papetti	
2026	Bergamo	Charlène Guignard; Marco Fabbri	Victoria Manni; Carlo Röthlisberger	Noemi Maria Tali; Noah Lafornara	

== Junior medalists ==
While junior-level championships were held in Italy prior to 2003, this is earliest for which full results have been documented.

=== Men's singles ===
Junior men's event medalists
Year	Location	Gold	Silver	Bronze	Ref.
2003	Lecco	Marco Fabbri	Giovanni Rinaldi	No other competitors	
2004	Milan	Federico Uslenghi	Stefano Pellin	Cristian Rapis	
2005	Merano	Luca Demattè	Marco Del Zotto	Cristian Rapis	
2006	Sesto San Giovanni	Ruben Errampalli	Davide Meregalli	Maurizio Zandron	
2007	Trento	Luca Demattè	Maurizio Zandron	Davide Meregalli	
2008	Milan	Saverio Giacomelli	Maurizio Zandron	Gabriele Maraviglia	
2009	Pinerolo	Saverio Giacomelli	Filippo Ambrosini	Nikita Revine	
2010	Brescia	Filippo Ambrosini	Nikita Revine	Maurizio Zandron	
2011	Milan	Nikita Revine	Alessandro Pezzoli	Carlo Vittorio Palermo	
2012	Courmayeur	Carlo Vittorio Palermo	Antonio Panfili	Giorgio Settembrini	
2013	Milan	Adrien Bannister	Carlo Vittorio Palermo	Alberto Vanz	
2014	Merano	Matteo Rizzo	Adrien Bannister	Mattia Dalla Torre	
2015	Aosta	Adrien Bannister	Alessandro Fadini	Paolo Balestri	
2016	Turin	Daniel Grassl	Nik Folini	Paolo Balestri	
2017	Egna	Daniel Grassl	Nik Folini	Gabriele Frangipani	
2018	Milan	Nik Folini	Gabriele Frangipani	Paolo Balestri	
2019	Trento	Gabriele Frangipani	Nikolaj Memola	Emanuele Indelicato	
2020	Bergamo	Gabriele Frangipani	Nikolaj Memola	Matteo Nalbone	
2021	Trento	Raffaele Francesco Zich	Nikolaj Memola	Matteo Nalbone	
2022	Turin	Nikolaj Memola	Emanuele Indelicato	Aiden Lino Alexander Buttiero Khorev	
2023	Brunico	Matteo Nalbone	Tommaso Barison	Aiden Lino Alexander Buttiero Khorev	
2024	Varese	Matteo Nalbone	Nikolay di Tria	Edoardo Profaizer	
2025	Bergamo	Matteo Marchioni	Nikolay di Tria	Nikita Dossena	
2026	Bergamo	Matteo Marchioni	Nikolay di Tria	Edoardo Profaizer	

=== Women's singles ===
Junior women's event medalists
Year	Location	Gold	Silver	Bronze	Ref.
2003	Lecco	Martina Sasanelli	Francesca Mongini	Cristiana Di Natale	
2004	Milan	Federica Constantini	Caterina Gabanella	Stefania Berton	
2005	Merano	Stefania Berton	Marcella De Trovato	Deborah Sacchi	
2006	Sesto San Giovanni	Marcella De Trovato	Deborah Sacchi	Roberta Rodeghiero	
2007	Trento	Francesca Rio	Deborah Sacchi	Alice Garlisi	
2008	Milan	Alice Garlisi	Silvia Lovison	Mariella Schwederski	
2009	Pinerolo	Amelia Schwienbacher	Caterina Andermarcher	Silvia Lovison	
2010	Brescia	Carlotta Ortenzi	Amelia Schwienbacher	Caterina Andermarcher	
2011	Milan	Micol Cristini	Giada Russo	Silvia Martinelli	
2012	Courmayeur	Giada Russo	Sara Casella	Elettra Olivotto	
2013	Milan	Sara Casella	Guia Maria Tagliapietra	Briley Pizzelanti	
2014	Merano	Guia Maria Tagliapietra	Rebecca Ghilardi	Bogdana Semyryazhko	
2015	Aosta	Lucrezia Gennaro	Sara Boschiroli	Giulia Foresti	
2016	Turin	Lucrezia Gennaro	Alessia Tornaghi	Lara Naki Gutmann	
2017	Egna	Elisabetta Leccardi	Alessia Tornaghi	Lara Naki Gutmann	
2018	Milan	Lucrezia Beccari	Lara Naki Gutmann	Marina Piredda	
2019	Trento	Marina Piredda	Giuditta Sartori	Ester Schwarz	
2020	Bergamo	Ginevra Lavinia Negrello	Carlotta Maria Gardini	Giorgia De Nadai	
2021	Trento	Anna Pezzetta	Clara Zadra	Camilla Paola Gardini	
2022	Turin	Amanda Ghezzo	Camilla Paola Gardini	Chiara Minighini	
2023	Brunico	Amanda Ghezzo	Elena Agostinelli	Guilia Barucchi	
2024	Varese	Noemi Joos	Giulia Barucchi	Annalisa Ursino	
2025	Bergamo	Beatrice Soldati	Eleonora Ciferri	Gioia Fiori	
2026	Bergamo	Beatrice Soldati	Zoe Mosca Barberis	Nicole De Rosa	

=== Pairs ===
Junior pairs event medalists
Year	Location	Gold	Silver	Bronze	Ref.
2003–06	No junior pairs competitors				
2007	Trento	Carolina Gillespie; Daniel Aggiano	No other competitors		
2008	Milan	Nicole Della Monica; Yannick Kocon	Carolina Gillespie; Daniel Aggiano	Chiara Picciolini; Christian Rapis	
2009	Pinerolo	Carolina Gillespie; Daniel Aggiano	No other competitors		
2010	Brescia	Nicole Della Monica; Yannick Kocon	Stefania Berton; Ondřej Hotárek	Marika Zanforlin; Federico Degli Esposti	
2011	Milan	Carolina Gillespie; Luca Demattè	No other competitors		
2012	Courmayeur	Giulia Foresti; Leo Luca Sforza	Alessandra Cernuschi; Filippo Ambrosini	Chiara Lafranchi; Benjamin Naggiar	
2013	Milan	Giulia Foresti; Leo Luca Sforza	Bianca Manacorda; Niccolò Macii	Alessandra Cernuschi; Filippo Ambrosini	
2014	Merano	Bianca Manacorda; Niccolò Macii	Alessandra Cernuschi; Filippo Ambrosini	No other competitors	
2015	Aosta	Bianca Manacorda; Niccolò Macii	Irma Angela Caldara; Edoardo Caputo	No other competitors	
2016	Turin	Irma Angela Caldara; Edoardo Caputo	No other competitors		
2017	Egna	Irma Angela Caldara; Edoardo Caputo	No other competitors		
2018	Milan	Sara Carli; Marco Pauletti	Giorgia Audenino; Fernando Fossa	No other competitors	
2019	Trento	Vivienne Contarino; Marco Pauletti	Alyssa Chiara Montan; Manuel Piazza	Federica Zamponi; Marco Zandron	
2020	Bergamo	Alyssa Chiara Montan; Manuel Piazza	Federica Zamponi; Marco Zandron	Giulia Papa; Riccardo Maria Maglio	
2021	Trento	Alyssa Chiara Montan; Manuel Piazza	Anna Valesi; Filippo Clerici	Federica Simoli; Alessandro Zarbo	
2022	Turin	Alyssa Chiara Montan; Filippo Clerici	No other competitors		
2023	Brunico	Irina Napolitano; Edoardo Comi	Giorgia Burin; Alberto Tommasi	No other competitors	
2024	Varese	Irina Napolitano; Edoardo Comi	Polina Polman; Gabriel Renoldi	No other competitors	
2025	Varese	Irina Napolitano; Edoardo Comi	Polina Polman; Gabriel Renoldi	Melissa Merrone; Alberto Tommasi	
2026	Bergamo	Irina Napolitano; Edoardo Comi	Polina Polman; Gabriel Renoldi	No other competitors	

=== Ice dance ===
Junior ice dance event medalists
Year	Location	Gold	Silver	Bronze	Ref.
2003	Lecco	Alessia Aureli; Andrea Vaturi	Anna Cappellini; Matteo Zanni	Camilla Spelta; Luca Lanotte	
2004	Milan	Anna Cappellini; Matteo Zanni	Denise Solenghi; Marco Garavaglia	Isabella Pajardi; Stefano Caruso	
2005	Merano	Anna Cappellini; Matteo Zanni	Camilla Pistorello; Luca Lanotte	Camilla Spelta; Marco Garavaglia	
2006	Sesto San Giovanni	Anna Cappellini; Luca Lanotte	Camilla Spelta; Marco Garavaglia	Isabella Pajardi; Stefano Caruso	
2007	Trento	Camilla Pistorello; Matteo Zanni	Camilla Spelta; Marco Garavaglia	Isabella Pajardi; Stefano Caruso	
2008	Milan	Isabella Pajardi; Stefano Caruso	Natalia Mitiushina; Matteo Zanni	Lorenza Alessandrini; Simone Vaturi	
2009	Pinerolo	Lorenza Alessandrini; Simone Vaturi	Federica Testa; Andrea Malnati	Paola Amati; Marco Fabbri	
2011	Milan	Sofia Sforza; Francesco Fioretti	Francesca Rizzo; Marco Manenti	Federica Bernardi; Daniel Ferrari	
2012	Courmayeur	Sofia Sforza; Francesco Fioretti	Alessia Busi; Andrea Fabbri	Carolina Moscheni; Igor Ogay	
2013	Milan	Sofia Sforza; Francesco Fioretti	Alessia Busi; Andrea Fabbri	Carolina Moscheni; Ádám Lukács	
2014	Merano	Valentina Gabusi; Nik Mirzakhani	Sofia Sforza; Leo Luca Sforza	Jasmine Tessari; Stefano Colafato	
2015	Aosta	Sara Ghislandi; Giona Terzo Ortenzi	Francesca Righi; Pietro Papetti	Federica Madaschi; Andrea Alchieri	
2016	Turin	Sara Ghislandi; Giona Terzo Ortenzi	Francesca Righi; Pietro Papetti	Carolina Portesi Peroni; Alessio Galli	
2017	Egna	Flora Agnes Mühlmeyer; Pietro Papetti	Carolina Portesi Peroni; Michael Chrastecky	Sara Campanini; Francesco Riva	
2018	Milan	Chiara Calderone; Pietro Papetti	Francesca Righi; Aleksei Dubrovin	Sara Campanini; Francesco Riva	
2019	Trento	Francesca Righi; Aleksei Dubrovin	Sara Campanini; Francesco Riva	Carolina Portesi Peroni; Michael Chrastecky	
2020	Bergamo	Carolina Portesi Peroni; Michael Chrastecky	Sara Campanini; Francesco Riva	Francesca Righi; Aleksei Dubrovin	
2021	Egna	Carolina Portesi Peroni; Michael Chrastecky	Nicole Calderari; Marco Cilli	Noemi Maria Tali; Stefano Frasca	
2022	Turin	Nicole Calderari; Marco Cilli	Noemi Maria Tali; Stefano Frasca	Sofia Kirichenko; Alessandro Bortolo Pellegrini	
2023	Brunico	Noemi Maria Tali; Stefano Frasca	Giorgia Galimberti; Matteo Libasse Mandelli	Alice Pizzorni; Massimiliano Bucciarelli	
2024	Pinerolo	Noemi Maria Tali; Noah Lafornara	Beatrice Ventura; Stefano Frasca	Vittoria Petracchi; Daniel Basile	
2025	Varese	Noemi Maria Tali; Noah Lafornara	Laura Finelli; Massimiliano Bucciarelli	Vittoria Petracchi; Daniel Basile	
2026	Bergamo	Arianna Soldati; Nicholas Tagliabue	Zoe Bianchi; Daniel Basile	Melissa Cachova; Ivan Morozov	

== Records ==
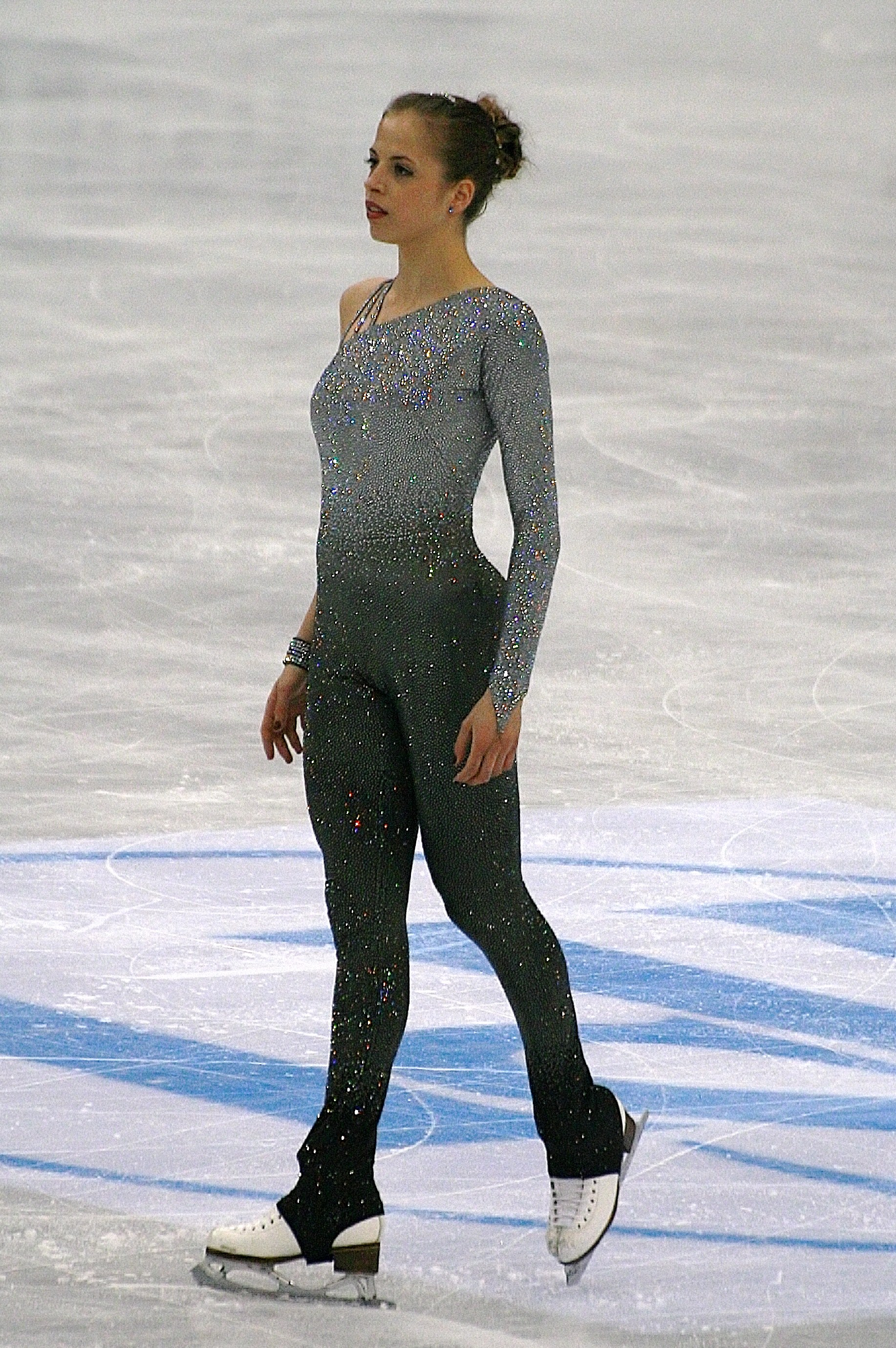
Carolina Kostner won nine Italian Championship titles in women's singles.

Records
Discipline	Most championship titles			
Discipline	Skater(s)	No.	Years	Ref.
Men's singles	Alberto Bonacossa	10	1914–15; 1918–26; 1928	
Men's singles	Carlo Fassi	10	1943; 1946–54	
Women's singles	Carolina Kostner	9	2003; 2005–07; 2009; 2011; 2013; 2017–18	
Pairs	Grazia Barcellona; Carlo Fassi	9	1942–43; 1946–51; 1954	
Ice dance	Barbara Fusar-Poli; Maurizio Margaglio	9	1995–2002; 2006	
Ice dance	Barbara Fusar-Poli; (Note: Barbara Fusar-Poli won one championship title while partnered with Alberto Reani (1994), and nine with Maurizio Margaglio (1995–2002).)	10	1994–2002; 2006	

== Works cited ==
- Pizzocari, Paolo (2001). Pattinaggio artistico e danza sul ghiaccio [Figure skating and ice dance] (in Italian). Milan: Sperling & Kupfer. ISBN 88-200-3203-1.
