= Isabella Pajardi =

Italian former competitive ice dancer (born 1989)

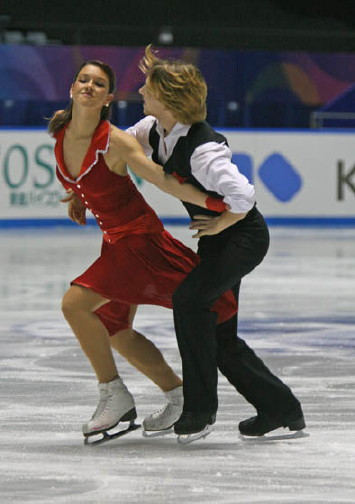
- Pajardi and Caruso at the 2008 NHK Trophy.

Personal information
- Full name: Isabella Pajardi
- Born: 24 January 1989 (age 37) Milan
- Height: 1.73 m (5 ft 8 in)

Figure skating career
- Country: Italy
- Skating club: Olympic Dream Ice School
- Began skating: 1993

Medal record
Italian Championships
Bronze medal – third place	2009 Pinerolo	Ice dance

Isabella Pajardi (born 24 January 1989) is an Italian former competitive ice dancer. She started skating at age four and was a single skater until 2000 when she began ice dancing with Stefano Caruso. They are the 2008 Italian junior national champions and placed 9th at the 2008 World Junior Championships.

== Programs ==
(with Caruso)

Season	Original dance	Free dance
2009–2010	Italian folk: Reginella by Massimo Ranieri; Tarantella Napoletana	Canone Inverso by Ennio Morricone; Concerto Grosso No. 1 - Tengo Allegro by New Trous
2008–2009	Baciami Piccina by Ray Gelato; New Orleans Blues by Ella Fitzgerald; Baciami Piccina by Ray Gelato	Romeo and Juliet by Sergei Prokofiev; Art of War by Vanessa-Mae (based on Romeo and Juliet by Sergei Prokofiev); Un Giorno Per Noi performed by Josh Groban
2007–2008	Torna Surriento; Tarantella by Claudio Villa	Notre-Dame de Paris by Riccardo Cocciante: Les Sans-Papiers; Belle; Le Temps des Cathedrales

== Competitive highlights ==
(with Caruso)

GP = Grand Prix; JGP = Junior Grand Prix

International
Event	02–03	03–04	04–05	05–06	06–07	07–08	08–09	09–10
Europeans							16th	
GP NHK Trophy							10th	
Nebelhorn								10th
Golden Spin							5th	
Universiade							9th	
International: Junior
Junior Worlds						9th		
JGP Final						7th		
JGP Austria						3rd		
JGP Bulgaria						1st		
JGP Czech Rep.		10th			8th			
JGP France					11th			
JGP Poland				11th				
Pavel Roman	11th		5th					
National
Italian Champ.	6th J		4th J	3rd J	3rd J	1st J	3rd	
J = Junior level
