= Ercole Cattaneo =

Italian figure skater (1906–1978)

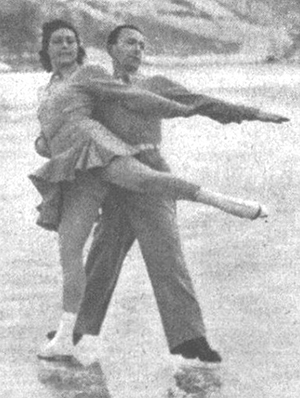
- Ercole and his wife Anna Cattaneo

Personal information
- Born: 3 December 1906 Milan, Italy
- Died: 26 July 1978 (aged 71)

Figure skating career
- Country: Italy
- Discipline: Single skating Pair skating
- Partner: Anna Cattaneo

Medal record
Italian Championships
Gold medal – first place	1936 Madonna di Campiglio	Singles
Gold medal – first place	1936 Madonna di Campiglio	Pairs
Gold medal – first place	1938 Milan	Singles
Gold medal – first place	1938 Milan	Pairs
Gold medal – first place	1939 Milan	Singles
Gold medal – first place	1939 Milan	Pairs
Gold medal – first place	1940 Milan	Singles
Gold medal – first place	1940 Milan	Pairs
Silver medal – second place	1935 Cortina d'Ampezzo	Singles

Ercole Cattaneo (3 December 1906 – 26 July 1978) was an Italian figure skater. He competed in the pairs event at the 1936 Winter Olympics.

== Competitive highlights ==
=== Men's singles ===
Competition	1935	1936	1938	1939	1940
Italian Championships	2nd	1st	1st	1st	1st

=== Pair skating (with Anna Cattaneo) ===
Competition	1936	1938	1939	1940
Italian Championships	1st	1st	1st	1st
