= Mattia Dalla Torre =

Italian figure skater

Personal information
- Born: 29 September 1996 (age 30) Borgo Valsugana, Italy
- Home town: Strigno, Italy
- Height: 1.82 m (5 ft 11 1/2 in)

Figure skating career
- Country: Italy
- Discipline: Ice dance (2021–23); Men's singles (2011–21)
- Partner: Elisabetta Leccardi (2021–23)
- Coach: Matteo Zanni; Barbora Silna Reznickova
- Skating club: Aosta Skating Club
- Began skating: 2006

Medal record
Italian Championships
Bronze medal – third place	2019 Trento	Singles
Bronze medal – third place	2020 Bergamo	Singles
Bronze medal – third place	2022 Turin	Ice dance

Mattia Dalla Torre (born 29 September 1996) is an Italian figure skater. He has won three senior international medals – gold at the 2017 Skate Helena, silver at the 2018 Sofia Trophy, and silver at the 2018 Egna Spring Trophy.

== Programs ==
Season	Short program	Free skating
2015–2016	Nothing Else Matters by Metallica	The Mission by Ennio Morricone
2014–2015	Nothing Else Matters by Metallica	Angels and Demons by Maxime Rodriguez; The Da Vinci Code by Hans Zimmer
2013–2014	Angels & Demons by Hans Zimmer; Nyah (from Mission: Impossible 2) by Hans Zimmer	

== Competitive highlights ==
- JGP – Event of the ISU Junior Grand Prix Series
- CS – Event of the ISU Challenger Series

=== Ice dance with Elisabetta Leccardi ===
Competition placements at senior level
Season	2021–22	2022–23
Italian Championships	3rd	
CS Lombardia Trophy		7th
CS Nebelhorn Trophy		9th
Bavarian Open	7th	
Egna Spring Trophy	8th	
Trophée Métropole Nice		7th

=== Single skating ===
Competition placements at senior level
Season	2014–15	2015–16	2016–17	2017–18	2018–19	2019–20	2020–21
Italian Championships	5th	8th	5th	5th	3rd	3rd	5th
CS Alpen Trophy					13th		
CS Golden Spin of Zagreb		19th				22nd	
CS Ice Star						12th	
CS Tallinn Trophy					10th		
Coupe du Printemps				9th			
Cup of Nice			12th	15th			
Cup of Tyrol			13th	9th			
Denkova-Staviski Cup				5th		3rd	
Egna Spring Trophy	6th			2nd	6th		
Golden Bear of Zagreb					7th	10th	
Merano Cup	4th	13th	8th				
NRW Trophy			7th				
Santa Claus Cup	4th						
Skate Helena			1st				
Sofia Trophy		5th		2nd	2nd		
Triglav Trophy			5th				
Winter Universiade					11th		

Competition placements at junior level
Season	2011–12	2012–13	2013–14	2014–15	2015–16
Italian Championships	6th	4th	3rd		
JGP Belarus			18th		
JGP Croatia					11th
JGP Slovenia				16th	
Bavarian Open		7th	9th		
Coupe du Printemps			7th		
Gardena Spring Trophy		6th			
Ice Challenge			7th		
Warsaw Cup		4th	4th		
