= Grazia Barcellona =

Italian figure skater (1929–2019)

Personal information
- Nationality: Italian
- Born: 22 January 1929; Milan, Italy
- Died: 2 October 2019 (aged 90)

Sport
- Sport: Figure skating

Grazia Barcellona (22 January 1929 – 2 October 2019) was an Italian figure skater. She competed in two events at the 1948 Winter Olympics.

== Results ==
=== Pairs with Carlo Fassi ===
International
Event	1946	1947	1948	1949	1950	1951	1952	1953	1954
Winter Olympics			13th						
European Champ.				9th					
National
Italian Champ.	1st	1st	1st	1st	1st	1st	1st	1st	1st

=== Ladies ===
International
Event	1948	1949	1950	1951	1952
Winter Olympics	24th				
European Champ.		16th			
National
Italian Champ.	1st	1st	1st	1st	1st
