= Christopher Mior =

Canadian-born Italian ice dancer (born 1987)

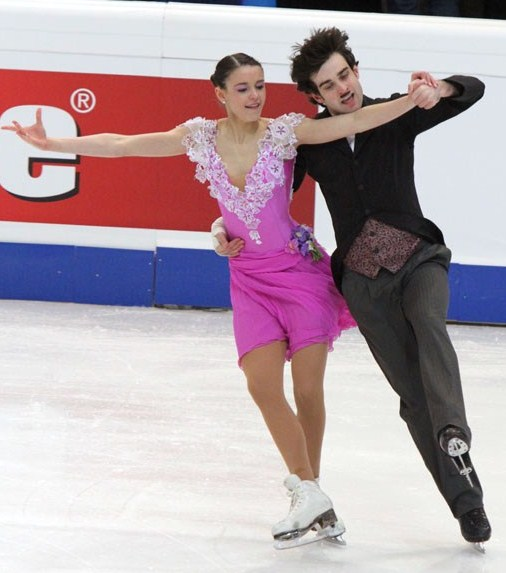
- Testa and Mior at the 2011 European Championships

Personal information
- Full name: Christopher Mior
- Born: February 15, 1987 (age 39) Toronto
- Height: 1.73 m (5 ft 8 in)

Figure skating career
- Country: Italy
- Partner: Federica Bernardi (ITA)
- Began skating: 1997

Medal record
Italian Championships
| Gold medal – first place | 2011 Milan | Ice dance |
| Bronze medal – third place | 2010 Brescia | Ice dance |
| Bronze medal – third place | 2013 Milan | Ice dance |

Christopher Mior (born February 15, 1987, in Toronto) is a Canadian-born Italian ice dancer. Early in his career, Mior competed for Canada with Patricia Stuckey and Krista Wolfenden. In 2009, he began competing for Italy with Federica Testa. They are the 2011 Italian national champions. He currently skates with Federica Bernardi.

== Competitive highlights ==
=== With Bernardi for Italy ===
Results
International
| Event | 2011–12 | 2012–13 | 2013–14 |
|---|---|---|---|
| Bavarian Open | 7th | | |
| Coupe de Nice | | 4th | |
| Ice Challenge | 7th | | |
| Nebelhorn Trophy | | 12th | |
National
| Italian Championships | WD | 3rd | WD |
WD = Withdrew

=== With Testa for Italy ===
Results
International
| Event | 2009–2010 | 2010–2011 |
|---|---|---|
| European Championships | 22nd | 18th |
| Finlandia Trophy | | 5th |
| Trophy of Lyon | | 2nd |
| Mont Blanc Trophy | 3rd | |
| NRW Trophy | 6th | |
National
| Italian Championships | 3rd | 1st |

=== With Stuckey for Canada ===
| Event | 2007–2008 | 2008–2009 |
|---|---|---|
| Canadian Championships | 8th J. | 12th |
J. = Junior level

=== With Wolfenden for Canada ===
| Event | 2006–2007 |
|---|---|
| Canadian Championships | 12th J. |
J. = Junior level
