= Luca Demattè =

Italian pair skater

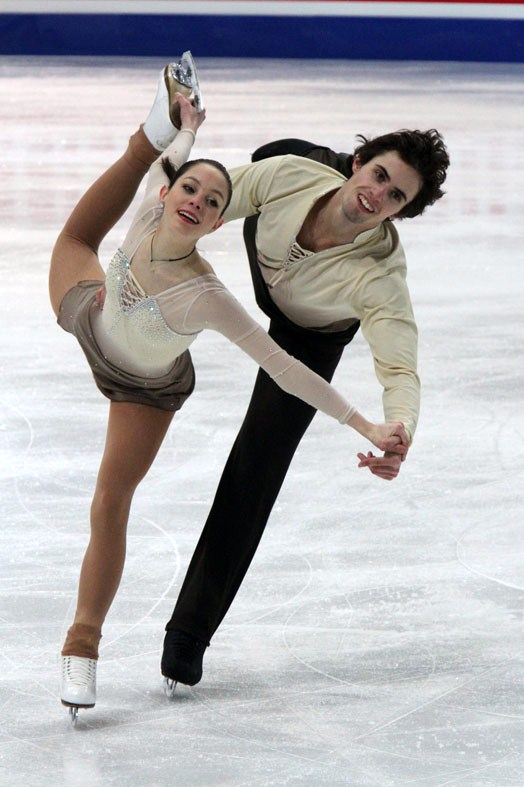
- Gillespie and Demattè at the 2011 European Championships

Personal information
- Born: 27 May 1990 (age 36) Cavalese, Italy
- Home town: Cavalese
- Height: 1.80 m (5 ft 11 in)

Figure skating career
- Country: Italy
- Partner: Giulia Foresti
- Coach: Rosanna Murante
- Skating club: Sesto Ice Skate Milano
- Began skating: 1996

Medal record
Italian Championships
Silver medal – second place	2012 Courmayeur	Pairs
Bronze medal – third place	2014 Merano	Pairs

Luca Demattè (born 27 May 1990) is an Italian pair skater. He competed with Carolina Gillespie from 2010 to 2012. They announced the end of their partnership in April 2012. In 2013, Demattè skated a few months with Kristina Bustamante, before teaming up with Giulia Foresti.

== Programs ==
(with Gillespie)

Season	Short program	Free skating
2011–2012	The Tourist by James Newton Howard	The Karate Kid by James Horner
2010–2011	The 20th Century	Baaria by Ennio Morricone

== Competitive highlights ==
=== With Foresti ===
International
Event	2013–2014
Bavarian Open	3rd
Challenge Cup	3rd
Toruń Cup	1st
National
Italian Championships	3rd

=== With Gillespie ===
Results
International
Event	2010–11	2011–12
European Championships	12th	12th
International: Junior
World Junior Championships	10th	
JGP Czech Republic	8th	
JGP Great Britain	11th	
National
Italian Championships		2nd
JGP = Junior Grand Prix

=== Singles career ===
Results
International
Event	2004–05	2005–06	2006–07	2007–08	2008–09	2009–10
JGP Great Britain				19th		
JGP Italy					21st	
JGP Romania				11th		
Bavarian Open				4th J.	2nd J.	
Gardena		9th J.	11th J.	10th J.		
Heiko Fischer			4th N.			
Merano Cup	2nd N.		10th J.	1st J.	2nd J.	
Triglav Trophy				2nd J.		
Warsaw Cup				3rd J.	7th J.	
National
Italian Champ.	1st J.		1st J.	6th	5th	9th
JGP = Junior Grand Prix; Levels: N. = Novice; J. = Junior
