= Guia Maria Tagliapietra =

Italian figure skater (born 1998)

Personal information
- Born: 11 August 1998 (age 28) Aosta, Italy
- Height: 1.63 m (5 ft 4 in)

Figure skating career
- Country: Italy
- Coach: Romina Poli
- Skating club: SC Courmayeur
- Began skating: 2003

Guia Maria Tagliapietra (born 11 August 1998) is an Italian figure skater. She has won three senior international medals and the 2014 Italian national junior title. She placed 15th at the 2015 World Junior Championships in Tallinn, Estonia.

== Programs ==
Season	Short program	Free skating
2017–2018	Talk to Her by Alberto Iglesias	Micmacs by Raphael Beau and Max Steiner
2015–2017	Moon River by Henry Mancini	Maleficent by James Newton Howard
2014–2015	Nero by Two Steps from Hell	Rain; Forbidden Colours; Fall of the Samurai by Sakamoto
2013–2014	Canon	La Follia by Antonio Vivaldi
2011–2012	Hernando's Hideaway (from The Pajama Game) by Jerry Ross and Richard Adler	Overture (from Snow White and the Seven Dwarfs) by Frank Churchill and Leigh Harline
2010–2011	Zorba the Greek by Mikis Theodorakis	Kung Fu Panda by Hans Zimmer and John Powell

== Competitive highlights ==
CS: Challenger Series; JGP: Junior Grand Prix

International
Event	10–11	11–12	12–13	13–14	14–15	15–16	16–17	17–18
CS Denkova-Stav.						WD		
CS Ice Challenge					9th			
CS Volvo Cup					14th			
CS Warsaw Cup							14th	
Coupe Printemps							5th	
Cup of Tyrol								7th
Denkova-Staviski				4th			7th	
Dragon Trophy							2nd	
Gardena Trophy					2nd			
Merano Cup						12th		
NRW Trophy							10th	
Sarajevo Open					1st			
Tallinn Trophy					6th			
International: Junior
Junior Worlds				30th	15th			
JGP Croatia					15th			
JGP Estonia				18th				
EYOF					6th			
Crystal Skate			2nd					
Gardena Trophy			4th					
Golden Bear							5th	
Merano Cup			3rd	2nd				
NRW Trophy			2nd					
Volvo Open Cup				5th				
International: Advanced novice
Gardena Trophy	7th	2nd						
Challenge Cup		4th						
Mont Blanc	1st							
Warsaw Cup		4th						
National
Italian Champ.		4th J	2nd J	1st J	7th		6th	
Levels: N = Novice; J = Junior
