= Alessandro Riccitelli =

Italian figure skater

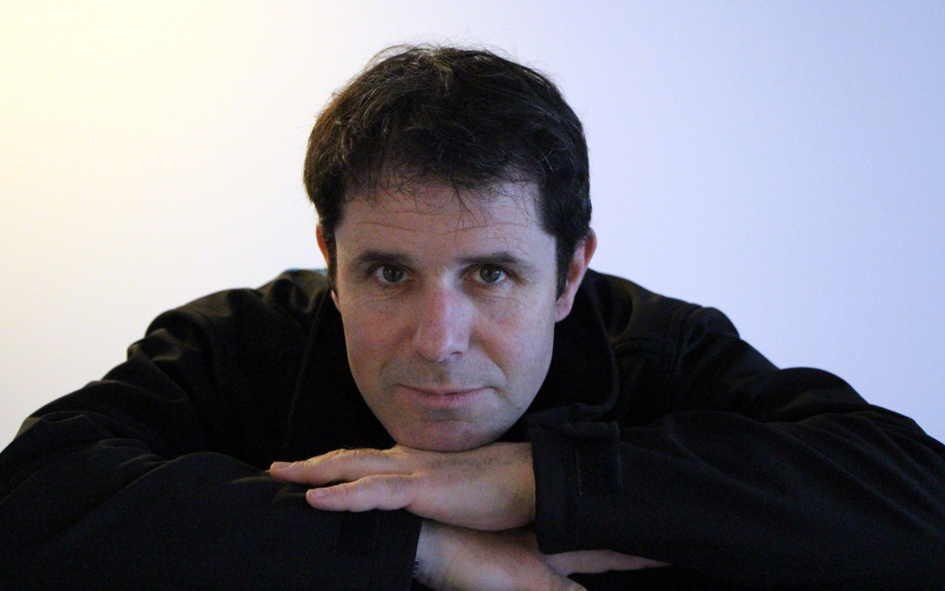
- Riccitelli in May 2013

Personal information
- Other names: Alexandre Riccitelli
- Born: 6 January 1965 (age 61)

Figure skating career
- Country: Italy
- Coach: A. Gaillard, Didier Gailhaguet, B. Van Zeebroeck, Günter Zöller
- Retired: c. 1991

Alessandro (Alexandre) Riccitelli (born 6 January 1965) is an Italian former competitive figure skater. He is the 1986 Fujifilm Trophy silver medalist and a seven-time Italian national champion (1984–91). He competed in several European and World Championships in the 1980s and 1990s, in addition to the 1988 Winter Olympics.

== Results ==
International
Event	83–84	84–85	85–86	86–87	87–88	88–89	89–90	90–91
Olympics					21st			
Worlds	18th	20th	21st	19th	21st	18th	16th	
Europeans		11th	16th	15th	12th	10th	13th	13th
Skate America				12th			9th	11th
Fujifilm Trophy				2nd				4th
Inter. de Paris							8th	10th
Prague Skate		5th			4th			
National
Italian Champ.	1st	1st	1st	1st	1st	1st	1st	1st
