= Sabine Contini =

Italian former competitive figure skater

Personal information
- Born: 22 January 1970 (age 56) Neuilly sur Seine

Figure skating career
- Country: Italy
- Retired: 1992

Sabine Contini (born 22 January 1970) is an Italian former competitive figure skater. She is the 1988 Prague Skate silver medalist, 1989 Grand Prix International St. Gervais bronze medalist, and 1989 Italian national champion. She reached the free skate at three ISU Championships – 1989 Europeans in Birmingham, England; 1990 Worlds in Halifax, Nova Scotia, Canada; and 1991 Europeans in Sofia, Bulgaria.

== Competitive highlights ==
International
Event	86–87	87–88	88–89	89–90	90–91	91–92
World Champ.				16th		
European Champ.			13th		12th	
Inter. de Paris					6th	
NHK Trophy					11th	
Prague Skate			2nd			
Prize of Moscow News	12th					
Skate Canada						9th
St. Gervais				3rd		
National
Italian Championships	3rd	2nd	1st		1st	
