= Giordano Abbondati =

Italian figure skater (1948–2005)

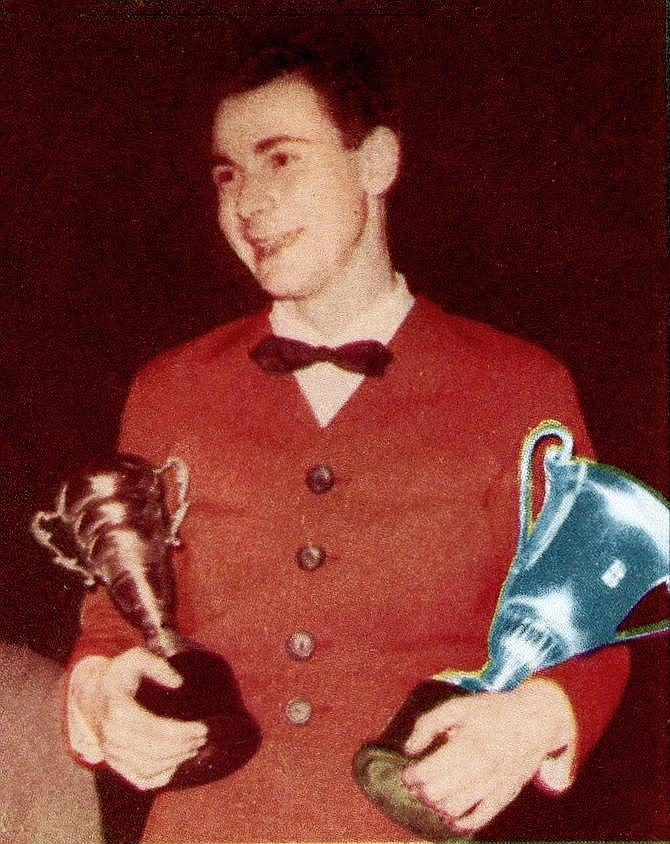

Personal information
- Born: 29 May 1948 Milan, Italy
- Died: 21 April 2005 (aged 56) Lambeth, South London, United Kingdom
- Height: 1.75 m (5 ft 9 in)
- Weight: 64 kg (141 lb)

Sport
- Sport: Figure skating

Giordano Giulio Abbondati (29 May 1948 – 21 April 2005) was an Italian figure skater and seven-time national champion in 1961–66 and 1968. He competed in several European and World Championships in the 1960s, in addition to the 1964 and 1968 Winter Olympic Games, in both of which he placed 14th.

Giordano retired from figure skating in 1968 to pursue a career in medicine but continued to be involved in figure skating as an international competition judge for many years. He married fellow judge Hely Rainesalo-Abbondati of Finland in 1974 and moved to Helsinki, Finland. He later moved to the UK with his wife and two children, where he practised as a consultant anesthesiologist at Central Middlesex Hospital in London, becoming Head of Anaesthetics and later Clinical Director of the pioneering Ambulatory Care and Diagnostics Centre (ACAD) which opened in 1999. He died from natural causes in 2005.

== Results ==
Event	1961	1962	1963	1964	1965	1966	1967	1968
Winter Olympic Games				14th				14th
World Championships			17th		14th	9th		16th
European Championships	14th	13th	15th	8th	11th	7th		11th
Italian Championships	1st	1st	1st	1st	1st	1st	1st	1st
