= Cristina Mauri =

Italian figure skating coach

Personal information
- Born: 1969 (age 56–57) Italy

Figure skating career
- Country: Italy
- Skating club: IceLab Sesto San Giovanni
- Retired: 1993

Cristina Mauri (born April 1969) is an Italian figure skating coach and former competitor in ladies' singles. She is the 1993 Italian national champion and competed in the final segment at two ISU Championships.

== Personal life ==
Mauri was born in 1969. She married her husband in August 1993. She is the mother of Italian ice dancer Jasmine Tessari.

Her sister, Patrizia, is a skating coach.

== Career ==
In the 1992–93 season, Mauri won the Italian national title and was selected to represent Italy at two ISU Championships. She qualified to the final segment at both, finishing 20th at the 1993 European Championships in Helsinki, Finland, and 21st at the 1993 World Championships in Prague, Czech Republic.

Mauri retired from competition in 1993 and began working as a skating coach at Forum di Assago in September of the same year. She has coached the following skaters:

Singles

- Stefania Berton
- Alice Garlisi
- Valentina Marchei, for 13 years.
- Elettra Maria Olivotto, from September 2016.
- Francesca Rio
- Maurizio Zandron

Pairs

- Alessandra Cernuschi / Filippo Ambrosini
- Nicole Della Monica / Matteo Guarise

== Competitive highlights ==
International
Event	1991–92	1992–93
World Championships		21st
European Championships		20th
National
Italian Championships	2nd	1st (Note: Information provided through personal correspondence from Cristina Mauri: "Nel 1993 io ho vinto il campionato Italiano a Roma. Seconda è arrivata Silvia Fontana e terza Vanessa Giunchi.")
