= Alberto Bonacossa =

Italian tennis player

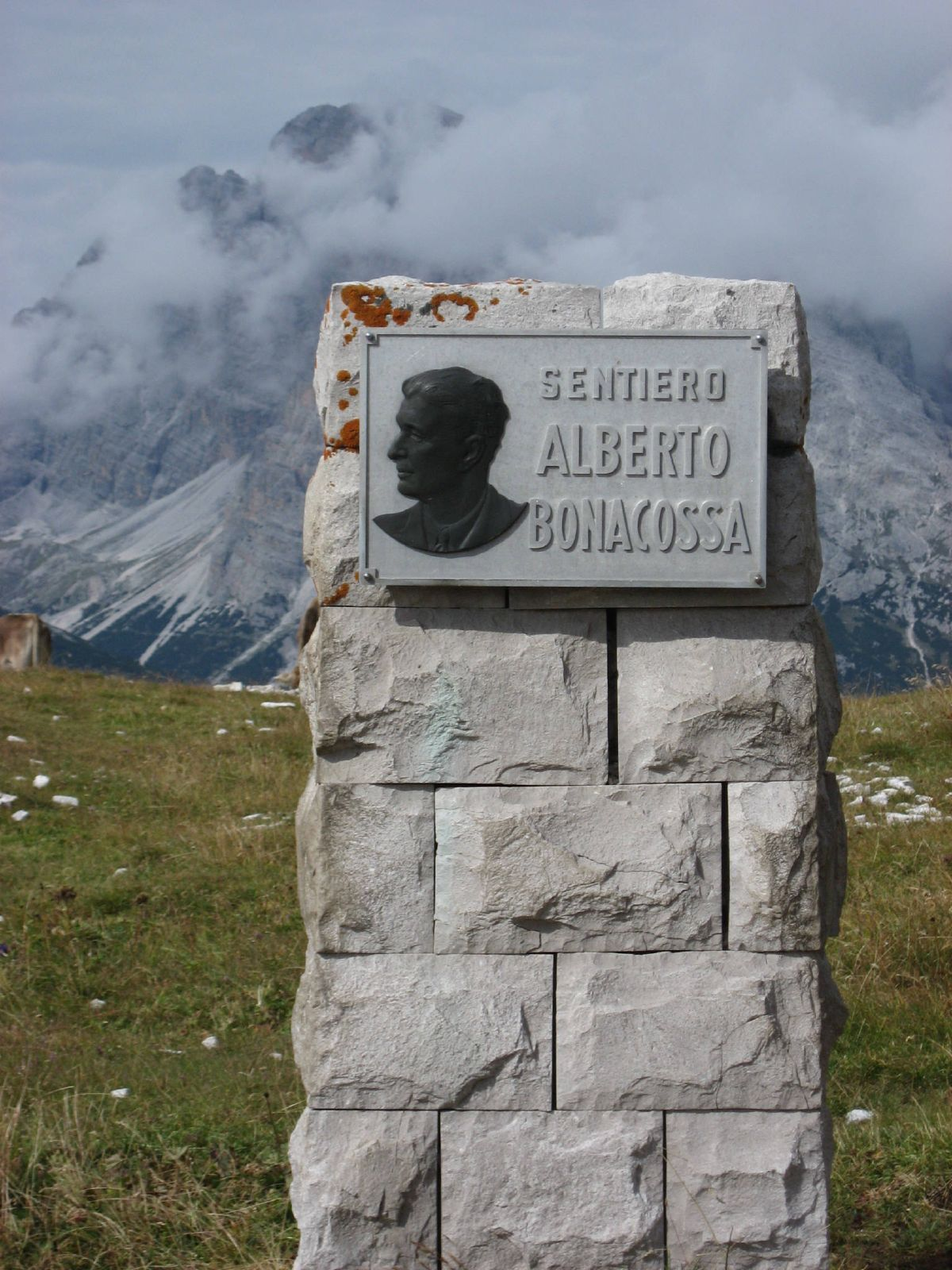

Personal information
- Born: 24 August 1883 Vigevano, Italy
- Died: 30 January 1953 (aged 69) Milan, Italy

Figure skating career
- Country: Italy
- Discipline: Men's singles Pair skating
- Partner: Marisa Bonacossa

Medal record
Italian Championships
Gold medal – first place	1914 Lago di Ghirla	Singles
Gold medal – first place	1915 Turin	Singles
Gold medal – first place	1920 Madesimo	Singles
Gold medal – first place	1920 Madesimo	Pairs
Gold medal – first place	1921 Madesimo	Singles
Gold medal – first place	1921 Madesimo	Pairs
Gold medal – first place	1922 Milan	Singles
Gold medal – first place	1922 Milan	Pairs
Gold medal – first place	1923 Turin	Singles
Gold medal – first place	1924 Milan	Singles
Gold medal – first place	1925 Turin	Singles
Gold medal – first place	1926 Milan	Singles
Gold medal – first place	1928 Trentino	Singles

Count Alberto Bonacossa (24 August 1883 – 30 January 1953) was an Italian tennis player, figure skater, and member of both the Italian Olympic Committee and the IOC. He was the owner and publisher of La Gazzetta dello Sport from 1929 until his death in 1953 when ownership passed to his son Cesare. A keen sportsman he competed in the men's singles event at the 1920 Summer Olympics. He also played football, raced motorcycles and skied at highly competitive level.

The first figure skating competition for Italians took place in 1912 in St. Moritz, Switzerland, but the first Italian national championships were not held until 1914. The competition was held at the Lago di Ghirla, sponsored by the Varese Skating Club and La Gazzetta dello Sport, attended by skaters from Piedmont and Lombardy, and featured events for men and couples. Alberto Bonacossa won the men's event, and Dina Mancio-Kind and Adelchi Candellero won the pairs' event. The following year, the championships were held on Lake Valentino in Turin. Bonacossa again won the men's event, and Mancio-Kind again won the pairs' event, but this time with Gaspare Voli. Competitions were halted from 1916 to 1919 due to World War I.

The Italian Skating Federation was established by Bonacossa in 1914.

== Competitive highlights ==
=== Men's singles ===
Competition	1914	1915	1920	1921	1922	1923	1924	1925	1926	1928
Italian Championships	1st	1st	1st	1st	1st	1st	1st	1st	1st	1st

=== Pair skating (with Marisa Bonacossa) ===
Competition	1920	1921	1922
Italian Championships	1st	1st	1st
