= Rita Trapanese =

Italian figure skater

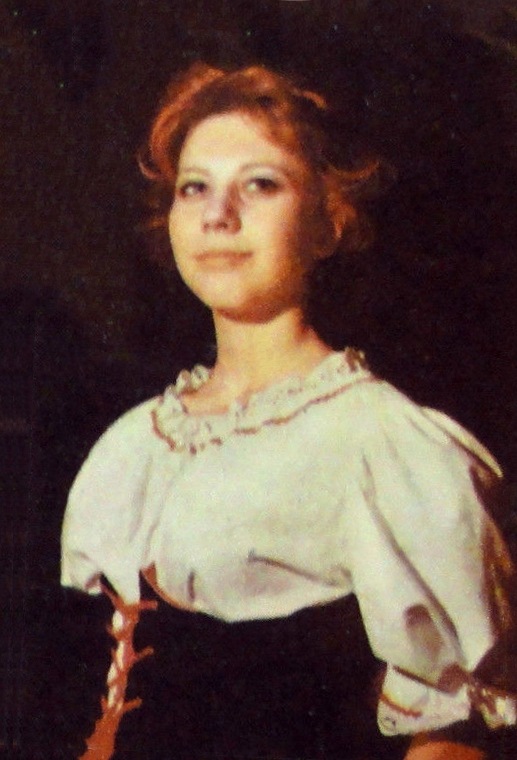

Personal information
- Full name: Rita Trapanese
- Born: 8 May 1951 Milan, Italy
- Died: 10 August 2000 (aged 49) Gattatico, Italy
- Height: 1.55 m (5 ft 1 in)

Figure skating career
- Country: Italy
- Retired: 1972

Medal record
European Championships
Silver medal – second place	1972 Gothenburg	Singles
Bronze medal – third place	1971 Zurich	Singles
Italian Championships
Gold medal – first place	1966 Cortina d'Ampezzo	Singles
Gold medal – first place	1967 Genoa	Singles
Gold medal – first place	1968 Milan	Singles
Gold medal – first place	1969 Merano	Singles
Gold medal – first place	1970 Milan	Singles
Gold medal – first place	1971 Ortisei	Singles
Gold medal – first place	1972 Milan	Singles
Silver medal – second place	1965 Milan	Singles

Rita Trapanese (8 May 1951 – 10 August 2000) was an Italian figure skater. She was the 1972 European silver medalist, the 1971 bronze medalist, and was a seven-time Italian national champion from 1966 to 1972. She represented Italy at the 1968 Winter Olympics, where she placed 25th at the age of 16, and at the 1972 Winter Olympics, where she placed 7th.

Trapanese died in an automobile accident in 2000 near Gattatico. The Rita Trapanese Trophy (Italian: Trofeo Rita Trapanese) is named in her honor, and is occasionally held as part of the ISU Junior Grand Prix of Figure Skating series.

== Competitive highlights ==
International
Event	64–65	65–66	66–67	67–68	68–69	69–70	70–71	71–72
Winter Olympics				25th				7th
World Champ.			13th		13th	8th	5th	
European Champ.		18th	15th	18th	8th	4th	3rd	2nd
Richmond Trophy						3rd	1st	
Prague Skate			7th					
National
Italian Championships	2nd	1st	1st	1st (Note: Rita Trapanese won the women's championship titles from 1966 to 1972.)	1st	1st	1st	1st
