= Fabrizio Garattoni =

Italian figure skater

Personal information
- Other names: Fabrice Garattoni

Figure skating career
- Country: Italy (from 1992); France (until 1991)
- Retired: 1997

Medal record
Representing Italy
Italian Championships
Gold medal – first place	1993	Singles
Gold medal – first place	1994	Singles
Gold medal – first place	1995	Singles
Gold medal – first place	1996	Singles
Silver medal – second place	1997	Singles

Fabrizio (Fabrice) Garattoni is an Italian former competitive figure skater. After competing for France early in his career, he switched to Italy in 1992 and became a four-time national champion from 1993 to 1996. He competed in several European and World Championships.

== Results ==
International
Event	1989–90 (FRA)	1990–91 (FRA)	1992–93 (ITA)	1993–94 (ITA)	1994–95 (ITA)	1995–96 (ITA)	1996–97 (ITA)
World Champ.			29th	31st	21st	22nd	
European Champ.				26th	13th	15th	
GP Skate Canada							12th
GP Nations Cup				8th			
GP Trophée de France						6th	
Czech Skate						?	
International: Junior
Piruetten	2nd						
National
Italian Champ.			1st	1st	1st	1st	2nd
French Champ.	7th	10th					
GP = Became part of Champions Series in 1995–96 season (renamed Grand Prix in 1998–99 season)
