= Yannick Kocon =

French pair skater

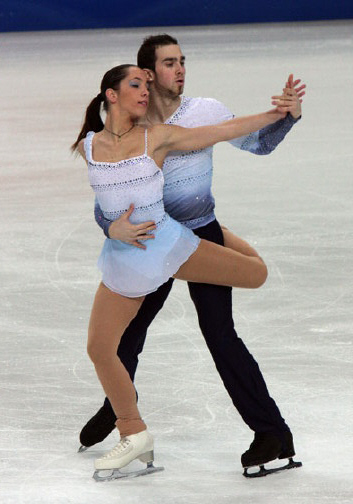
- Della Monica and Kocon in 2009.

Personal information
- Born: 20 August 1986 (age 40) Évry, Essonne, France
- Height: 1.75 m (5 ft 9 in)

Figure skating career
- Country: Italy (2007–11); France (until 2007)
- Skating club: Olympic Dream Ice School

Medal record
Italian Championships
Gold medal – first place	2009 Pinerolo	Pairs
Gold medal – first place	2010 Brescia	Pairs

Yannick Kocon (born 20 August 1986) is a French former pair skater. Competing for Italy with Nicole Della Monica, he won four international medals and the Italian national title twice (2009–10). The pair placed sixth at the 2009 and 2010 European Championships and 12th at the 2010 Winter Olympics.

== Career ==
Kocon competed for France as a single skater on the junior level. He started pair skating in 2007 when he teamed up with Nicole Della Monica, who was also a single skater until then. They represented Italy at the 2010 Winter Olympics. Their partnership ended in January 2011 — Della Monica had a chronic inflammation in her left knee and her recovery time was uncertain.

In 2012, Kocon trained with Lubov Iliushechkina.

== Programs ==
=== With Della Monica ===
Season	Short program	Free skating
2010–2011	Piano Fantasy by William Joseph	Nocturne by Ennio Morricone
2009–2010	Angels & Demons by Hans Zimmer	The Mission by Ennio Morricone
2008–2009	Boléro by Maurice Ravel	The Mission by Ennio Morricone
2007–2008	Lunatico by Gotan Project	Soundtrack medley by Maxime Rodriguez

=== Singles career ===
Season	Short program	Free skating
2005–2006	Selections performed by Edvin Marton	King Arthur by Hans Zimmer
2004–2005	Ghost Love Acore	The 13th Warrior by Jerry Goldsmith

== Competitive highlights ==
=== Pair skating with Nicole Della Monica (for Italy) ===
International
Event	2007–08	2008–09	2009–10	2010–11
Olympics			12th	
Worlds		18th		
Europeans		6th	6th	
GP Cup of China				6th
GP Cup of Russia			5th	
Cup of Nice				2nd
Golden Spin		2nd		WD
NRW Trophy		1st	1st	
International: Junior
Junior Worlds	14th			
National
Italian Champ.	1st J.	1st	1st	WD

=== Single skating (for France) ===
International
Event	2002–03	2003–04	2004–05	2005–06	2006–07
Cup of Nice					5th
International: Junior
Junior Worlds				19th	
JGP Andorra				8th	
JGP Romania			9th		
JGP Slovakia				8th	
JGP Ukraine			12th		
Gardena		5th			
National
French Champ.		13th	8th	9th	13th
French Junior Ch.	2nd	4th	3rd		
