= Karel Zelenka =

Czech-Italian figure skater

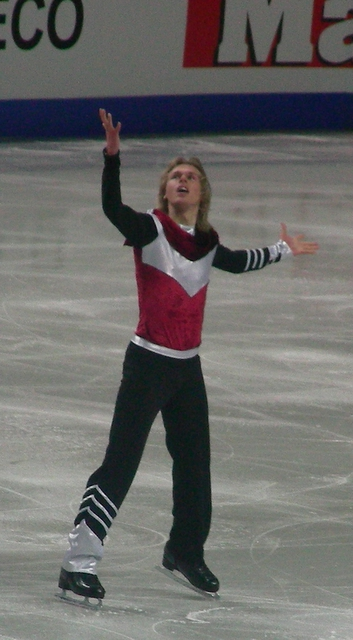
- Zelenka in 2007

Personal information
- Born: March 31, 1983 (age 43) Louny, Czechoslovakia
- Height: 1.75 m (5 ft 9 in)

Figure skating career
- Country: Italy
- Coach: Karel Zelenka Sr., Mirco Botta, Edoardo De Bernardis
- Skating club: Agora Skating Team
- Began skating: 1988
- Retired: 2010

Medal record
Italian Championships
| Gold medal – first place | 2003 Lecco | Singles |
| Gold medal – first place | 2004 Milan | Singles |
| Gold medal – first place | 2005 Merano | Singles |
| Gold medal – first place | 2006 Sesto San Giovanni | Singles |
| Gold medal – first place | 2007 Trento | Singles |
| Silver medal – second place | 2000 Merano | Singles |
| Silver medal – second place | 2001 Milan | Singles |
| Silver medal – second place | 2002 Collalbo | Singles |
| Silver medal – second place | 2008 Milan | Singles |
| Bronze medal – third place | 2010 Brescia | Singles |

Karel Zelenka (born March 31, 1983) is a Czech-Italian former competitive figure skater. He is a five-time (2003–2007) Italian national champion and competed at the 2006 Winter Olympics. He qualified to the free skate at eleven ISU Championships – three World, three World Junior, and five European Championships – and finished in the top ten twice.

== Personal life ==
Zelenka was born in 1983 in Louny, Czechoslovakia. His father is a figure skating coach. The family moved to Italy when the younger Zelenka was six years old. He received Italian citizenship in January 2006.

== Career ==
Zelenka debuted on the ISU Junior Series (ISU Junior Grand Prix) in 1997. He won the Italian junior title in the 1998–99 season and was sent to his first ISU Championship – 1999 Junior Worlds in Zagreb, Croatia, where he finished 20th after qualifying to the final segment.

Zelenka placed 19th at the 2000 Junior Worlds in Oberstdorf, Germany, and 8th at the 2001 Junior Worlds in Sofia, Bulgaria. In October 2001, he won the silver medal at his JGP assignment in Poland.

Zelenka won the first of his five consecutive senior national titles in the 2002–03 season. He reached the free skate at the 2003 European Championships in Malmö but was eliminated after the short program at the 2003 World Championships in Washington, D.C.

Zelenka competed at the 2006 Winter Olympics in Turin; he placed 25th in the short program and missed qualifying to the free skate by one spot. He achieved his career-best ISU Championship placement, 7th, at the 2007 European Championships in Warsaw.

He trained in Milan, Italy; Oberstdorf, Germany; and Switzerland.

== Programs ==
| Season | Short program | Free skating |
|---|---|---|
| 2009–10 | Blues for Klook by Eddy Louiss | Burn the Floor; Cheek to Cheek; Let Yourself Go; Top Hat; White Tie and Tails |
| 2008–09 | Nut Rocker by Robert Wells | Burn the Floor; Cheek to Cheek; Let Yourself Go; Top Hat; White Tie and Tails |
| 2007–08 | Blues for Klook by Eddy Louiss | The Truman Show by Burkhard Dallwitz, Philip Glass |
| 2006–07 | Blues for Klook by Eddy Louiss | Alexander by Vangelis |
| 2005–06 | Romeo and Juliet by Sergei Prokofiev; Art of War by Vanessa-Mae | Alexander by Vangelis |
| 2004–05 | Elements by Frank Nimsgren | Lord of the Dance by Ronan Hardiman; Dreamcatcher by Secret Garden |
| 2003–04 | Quixote by Magnus Fiennes performed by Bond | Lord of the Dance by Ronan Hardiman |
| 2002–03 | Quixote by Magnus Fiennes performed by Bond | Light Cavalry by Franz von Suppé, London Symphony Orchestra |
| 2000–01 | Live at the Acropolis by Yanni, The Royal Philharmonic Orchestra | Carmen by Georges Bizet |

== Competitive highlights ==
GP: Grand Prix; JGP: Junior Grand Prix

International
| Event | 98–99 | 99–00 | 00–01 | 01–02 | 02–03 | 03–04 | 04–05 | 05–06 | 06–07 | 07–08 | 08–09 | 09–10 |
|---|---|---|---|---|---|---|---|---|---|---|---|---|
| Olympics | | | | | | | | 25th | | | | |
| Worlds | | | | | 25th | | 20th | 25th | 17th | 16th | | |
| Europeans | | | | | 19th | 16th | | 19th | 7th | 15th | | 23rd |
| GP Cup of China | | | | | | | | | | 6th | | |
| GP Skate America | | | | | | | | | 10th | 12th | | |
| GP Skate Canada | | | | | | | | 10th | | | | |
| Finlandia Trophy | | | | | | | | | | | 7th | 16th |
| Golden Spin | | | | | 10th | 4th | | 6th | | | | |
| Nebelhorn Trophy | | | | | | | | | 5th | | | |
| Nepela Memorial | | | | | | 3rd | | | | | | |
| NRW Trophy | | | | | | | | | | | | 13th |
| Schäfer Memorial | | | | | | | | | 4th | | | |
| Triglav Trophy | | | | | | | | | | | 4th | |
International: Junior
| Junior Worlds | 20th | 19th | 8th | | | | | | | | | |
| JGP Germany | 12th | | 5th | | | | | | | | | |
| JGP Italy | | | | 6th | | | | | | | | |
| JGP Norway | | 15th | 8th | | | | | | | | | |
| JGP Poland | | | | 2nd | | | | | | | | |
| JGP Slovakia | 14th | | | | | | | | | | | |
| JGP Slovenia | | 10th | | | | | | | | | | |
National
| Italian Champ. | 1st J | 2nd | 2nd | 2nd | 1st | 1st | 1st | 1st | 1st | 2nd | WD | 3rd |
J = Junior level; WD = Withdrew
