= Alessandra Cernuschi =

Italian pair skater

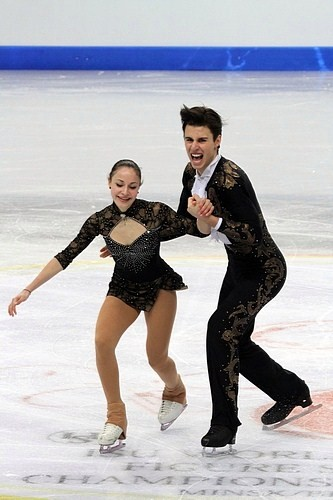
- Alessandra Cernuschi and Filippo Ambrosini at the 2012 World Junior Figure Skating Championships

Personal information
- Born: 13 January 1997 (age 29) Milan, Italy
- Height: 1.62 m (5 ft 4 in)

Figure skating career
- Country: Italy
- Discipline: Pair skating
- Partner: Filippo Ambrosini (2011–15)
- Began skating: 2004
- Retired: April 2015

Medal record
Italian Championships
Bronze medal – third place	2015 Turin	Pairs

Alessandra Cernuschi (born 13 January 1997) is an Italian former pair skater. With partner Filippo Ambrosini, she is the 2015 Bavarian Open silver medalist and finished tenth at the 2015 European Championships.

== Programs ==
(with Ambrosini)

Season	Short program	Free skating
2014–2015	Un Giorno Per Noi (from Romeo and Juliet) by Nino Rota	Tosca by Giacomo Puccini: E lucevan le stelle; Finale
2013–2014	Romeo and Juliet by Nino Rota	Pearl Harbor by Hans Zimmer
2012–2013	El Conquistador by Maxime Rodriguez	Pearl Harbor by Hans Zimmer
2011–2012	Have You Ever Really Loved a Woman? from Don Juan DeMarco by Bryan Adams; Concierto de Aranjuez by Joaquín Rodrigo	Piano Concerto No. 2 by Sergei Rachmaninoff

== Competitive highlights ==
=== Pair skating with Filippo Ambrosini ===
Competition placements at senior level
Season	2013–14	2014–15
European Championships	17th	10th
Italian Championships		3rd
CS Golden Spin of Zagreb		5th
CS Ice Challenge		5th
CS Volvo Open Cup		4th
Bavarian Open		2nd
Mentor Toruń Cup		4th
Merano Cup	5th	

Competition placements at junior level
Season	2011–12	2012–13	2013–14
World Junior Championships	20th		8th
Italian Championships	2nd	3rd	2nd
JGP Austria		14th	
JGP Belarus			5th
JGP Slovakia			3rd
Bavarian Open	5th	4th	
Coupe du Printemps		3rd	
NRW Trophy	5th		
Warsaw Cup		9th	

=== Single skating ===
International
Event	2010–11	2011–12
Cup of Nice		14th J.
National
Italian Championships	8th J.	9th J.
