= Anna Cattaneo =

Italian figure skater (1911–2002)

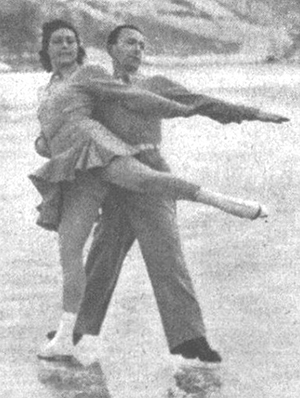
- Anna and her husband Ercole Cattaneo

Personal information
- Nationality: Italian
- Born: 23 August 1911 Milan, Italy
- Died: 22 October 2002 (aged 91) San Felice del Benaco, Italy

Sport
- Sport: Figure skating

Anna Cattaneo (23 August 1911 – 22 October 2002) was an Italian figure skater. She competed in the pairs event at the 1936 Winter Olympics.
