= Roberto Pelizzola =

Italian figure skating coach

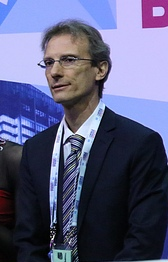

Personal information
- Born: 13 October 1958 (age 67) Milan, Italy

Figure skating career
- Country: Italy
- Skating club: Club Pattinaggio Ritmico Milano

Roberto Pelizzola (born 13 October 1958 in Milan) is an Italian figure skating coach and former competitive ice dancer. He competed twice at the Olympics.

== Competitive highlights ==
=== With Trovati ===
International
| Event | 1986–87 | 1987–88 |
|---|---|---|
| Winter Olympics | | 10th |
| World Championships | 11th | 10th |
| European Championships | 9th | 7th |
| Fujifilm Trophy | 1st | |
| International de Paris | | 1st |
| NHK Trophy | | 4th |
| Skate Canada | | 3rd |
| International St. Gervais | 2nd | |
National
| Italian Championships | 1st | 1st |

=== With Micheli ===
International
| Event | 1981–82 | 1982–83 | 1983–84 | 1984–85 | 1985–86 |
|---|---|---|---|---|---|
| Winter Olympics | | | 15th | | |
| World Championships | WD | 11th | 13th | 8th | 10th |
| European Championships | 13th | 8th | 10th | 7th | 7th |
| Golden Spin of Zagreb | | | | 2nd | |
| International St. Gervais | | 2nd | | | |
| Morzine Avoriaz | | | | 3rd | |
| Winter Universiade | | 3rd | | | |
National
| Italian Championships | 1st | 1st | 1st | 1st | 1st |
WD = Withdrew

=== With Parisi ===
International
| Event | 1979–80 | 1980–81 |
|---|---|---|
| World Championships | | 15th |
| European Championships | 13th | 11th |
National
| Italian Championships | | 1st |

=== With Masserenz ===
International
| Event | 1976 |
|---|---|
| World Junior Championships | 6th |
