= Francesca Rio =

Italian former competitive figure skater (born 1990)

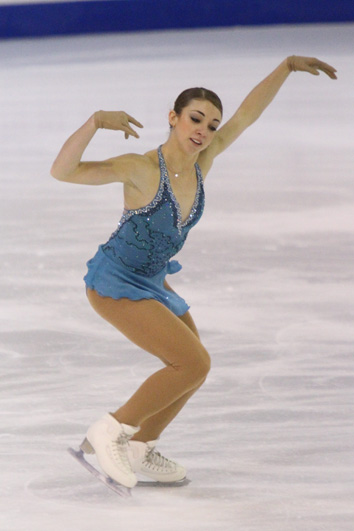
- Rio in 2010

Personal information
- Born: 16 December 1990 (age 35) Como, Italy
- Home town: Como
- Height: 1.67 m (5 ft 5 1/2 in)

Figure skating career
- Country: Italy
- Coach: Christina Mauri, Pierre Trente
- Skating club: Forum SSDRL Milano
- Began skating: 1997
- Retired: November 2014

Medal record
Italian Championships
Silver medal – second place	2009 Pinerolo	Singles
Silver medal – second place	2012 Courmayeur	Singles
Silver medal – second place	2014 Merano	Singles
Bronze medal – third place	2008 Milan	Singles

Francesca Rio (born 16 December 1990) is an Italian former competitive figure skater. She won ten senior international medals and four Italian national medals (three silver, one bronze). She represented Italy at five ISU Championships, reaching the free skate at the 2009 Junior Worlds in Sofia, 2009 Europeans in Helsinki, 2010 Junior Worlds in The Hague, and 2012 Europeans in Sheffield. She also competed at two Winter Universiades – 2011 (Erzurum) and 2013 (Trento). An injury having disrupted her intended final competitive season, Rio retired in November 2014.

== Programs ==
Season	Short program	Free skating
2013–2014		Malagueña by Ernesto Lecuona
2011–2012	Piano Fantasy by William Joseph	Sheherazade by Nikolai Rimsky-Korsakov
2010–2011	La Muerte del Angel by Astor Piazzolla	Sheherazade by Nikolai Rimsky-Korsakov
2009–2010	Harbinger by Mike Oldfield	Notre-Dame de Paris by Riccardo Cocciante
2008–2009	Harbinger by Mike Oldfield	Oceano by Roberto Cacciapaglia
2007–2008	Tosca by Giacomo Puccini performed by Maksim Mrvica	Violentango by Astor Piazzolla

== Competitive highlights ==
JGP: Junior Grand Prix

International
Event	04–05	05–06	06–07	07–08	08–09	09–10	10–11	11–12	12–13	13–14
Europeans					15th			23rd		
Bavarian Open									6th	
Challenge Cup									5th	
Cup of Nice							13th	15th		
Crystal Skate								4th	11th	2nd
DS Cup									2nd	3rd
Gardena								3rd	6th	
Golden Spin					6th					
Hellmut Seibt										2nd
Lombardia										6th
Merano Cup					3rd		13th			5th
Nebelhorn							7th	8th		
NRW Trophy					2nd					
Printemps								2nd		
Triglav Trophy				1st					4th	2nd
Universiade							12th			10th
Warsaw Cup									11th	
International: Junior
Junior Worlds				33rd	11th	20th				
JGP Austria				18th						
JGP Croatia				12th						
JGP Germany						21st				
JGP Italy					14th					
JGP U.K.					11th					
Challenge Cup			1st J.							
Fischer Pokal			2nd J.							
Gardena			1st J.							
Merano Cup			6th J.							
Skate Celje			1st J.							
National
Italian Champ.	9th J.	5th J.	1st J.	3rd	2nd	4th		2nd	8th	2nd
J. = Junior level; WD = Withdrew

== Detailed results ==
Results in the 2013-–14 season
Date	Event	SP		FS		Total	
Date	Event	P	Score	P	Score	P	Score
Sep 19–22, 2012	(Italy) 2013 Lombardia Trophy	4	46.56	8	72.36	6	118.92
Oct 24–27, 2013	2013 Crystal Skate of Romania	3	47.16	4	86.53	2	133.69
Nov 15–17, 2013	(Italy) 2013 Merano Cup	8	41.28	3	79.49	5	120.77
Nov 29–Dec 1, 2013	(Bulgaria) 2013 Denkova-Staviski Cup	1	52.51	3	92.48	3	144.99
Dec 9–15, 2013	(Italy) 2013 Universiade	9	43.40	9	84.92	8	128.32
Dec 19–22, 2013	(Italy) 2013 Italian Championships	2	53.18	3	97.47	2	146.65
Feb 26–Mar 1, 2014	(Austria) 2014 Hellmut Seibt Memorial	6	47.58	3	86.28	2	133.86
Apr 2–6, 2014	(Slovenia) 2014 Triglav Trophy	2	50.43	3	88.93	2	139.36

Results in the 2012-–13 season
Date	Event	SP		FS		Total	
Date	Event	P	Score	P	Score	P	Score
Oct 5–7, 2012	(Slovakia) 2012 Ondrej Nepela Memorial	13	37.72	11	69.98	11	107.70
Oct 30–Nov 4, 2012	2012 Crystal Skate of Romania	10	34.13	11	66.07	11	100.20
Nov 15–18, 2012	(Poland) 2012 Warsaw Cup	10	40.01	13	67.25	11	107.26
Nov 29–Dec 1, 2013	(Bulgaria) 2013 Denkova-Staviski Cup	1	52.51	3	92.48	3	144.99
Dec 19–22, 2012	(Italy) 2013 Italian Championships	5	50.42	8	74.46	8	124.88
Feb 6–11, 2013	(Germany) 2013 Bavarian Open	4	50.29	11	81.78	6	132.07
Feb 21–24, 2013	(Netherlands) 2013 Challenge Cup	4	52.89	8	83.20	5	136.09
Mar 27–31, 2013	(Slovenia) 2013 Triglav Trophy	4	43.24	4	80.72	4	123.96
Apr 2–3, 2013	(Italy) 2013 Gardena Spring Trophy	4	49.36	7	82.69	6	132.05

Results in the 2011-–12 season
Date	Event	SP		FS		Total	
Date	Event	P	Score	P	Score	P	Score
Sep 22–24, 2011	(Germany) 2011 Nebelhorn Trophy	12	39.72	6	80.77	8	120.49
Oct 26–30, 2011	(France) 2011 Cup of Nice	6	46.04	16	68.19	15	114.23
Nov 11–13, 2011	2011 Crystal Skate of Romania	2	46.17	6	79.72	4	125.89
Nov 29–Dec 4, 2011	(Germany) 2011 NRW Trophy	6	51.24	9	88.85	7	140.09
Dec 19–22, 2011	(Italy) 2012 Italian Championships	3	48.08	2	83.82	2	131.36
Jan 23–29, 2012	(United Kingdom) 2012 European Championships	22	40.02	23	68.64	23	108.66
Mar 16–18, 2012	(Luxembourg) 2012 Coupe du Printemps	2	47.34	2	87.81	2	135.15
Apr 4–8, 2012	(Slovenia) 2012 Triglav Trophy	4	47.79	16	65.20	15	112.99
Apr 13–15, 2012	(Italy) 2012 Gardena Spring Trophy	3	44.26	3	77.50	3	121.76

Results in the 2010-–11 season
Date	Event	SP		FS		Total	
Date	Event	P	Score	P	Score	P	Score
Sep 22–25, 2010	(Germany) 2010 Nebelhorn Trophy	5	44.23	7	76.84	7	121.07
Oct 13–17, 2010	(France) 2010 Cup of Nice	9	45.18	13	75.27	13	120.45
Nov 20–21, 2010	(Italy) 2010 Merano Cup	19	34.29	13	69.74	13	104.03
Jan 30–Feb 5, 2011	(Italy) 2011 Universiade	15	34.94	11	75.97	12	115.91
Mar 7–10, 2011	(Italy) 2012 Gardena Spring Trophy	11	37.07	11	61.59	11	98.66

Results in the 2008-–09 season
Date	Event	SP		FS		Total	
Date	Event	P	Score	P	Score	P	Score
Nov 7–10, 2008	(Italy) 2008 Merano Cup	3	39.30	3	71.93	3	111.23
Nov 13–16, 2008	(Croatia) 2008 Golden Spin of Zagreb	6	43.76	4	83.52	6	127.28
Dec 4–7, 2008	(Germany) 2008 NRW Trophy	5	48.26	2	88.98	2	119.61
Jan 20–25, 2009	(Finland) 2009 European Championships	17	42.24	15	77.37	15	119.61

=== Junior level ===
Results in the 2009-–10 season
Date	Event	SP		FS		Total	
Date	Event	P	Score	P	Score	P	Score
Sep 30–Oct 4, 2009	2009 JGP Germany	14	36.52	23	57.16	21	93.68
Dec 19–21, 2009	(Italy) 2010 Italian Senior Championships	4	42.66	3	81.27	4	123.93
Mar 9–13, 2010	(Netherlands) 2010 World Junior Championships	16	44.64	20	62.48	20	107.12

Results in the 2008-–09 season
Date	Event	SP		FS		Total	
Date	Event	P	Score	P	Score	P	Score
Sep 3–7, 2008	2008 JGP Italy	18	36.34	11	65.55	14	101.89
Oct 15–18, 2008	2008 JGP United Kingdom	15	38.24	7	73.52	11	111.76
Dec 18–21, 2008	(Italy) 2009 Italian Senior Championships	3	52.40	2	97.34	2	149.74
Feb 22–Mar 1, 2009	(Bulgaria) 2009 World Junior Championships	7	48.24	12	74.46	11	122.70

Results in the 2007-–08 season
Date	Event	SP		FS		Total	
Date	Event	P	Score	P	Score	P	Score
Sep 13–16, 2007	2007 JGP Austria	17	36.29	18	61.99	18	98.28
Sep 27–30, 2007	2008 JGP Croatia	19	30.30	10	67.60	12	97.90
Dec 19–21, 2007	(Italy) 2008 Italian Senior Championships	3	47.43	3	75.24	3	122.67
Feb 25–Mar 2, 2008	(Bulgaria) 2008 World Junior Championships	32	34.45	—	—	32	34.45
