= 2015 European Figure Skating Championships =

Figure skating competition

- Type: ISU Championship
- Date: 26 January – 1 February 2015
- Season: 2014–15
- Location: Stockholm, Sweden
- Host: Svenska Konståkningsförbundet
- Venue: Ericsson Globe

Champions
- Men's singles: (Spain) Javier Fernández
- Ladies' singles: (Russia) Elizaveta Tuktamysheva
- Pairs: (Russia) Yuko Kavaguti / Alexander Smirnov
- Ice dance: (France) Gabriella Papadakis / Guillaume Cizeron
- Previous: 2014 European Championships
- Next: 2016 European Championships

The 2015 European Figure Skating Championships were held 26 January – 1 February 2015 in Stockholm, Sweden. Medals were awarded in the disciplines of men's singles, ladies' singles, pairs, and ice dancing.

== Overview ==
The event was the first figure skating ISU Championship to be held in Stockholm since 1947, when the city hosted the World Championships. It last hosted the European Championships in 1912. Ericsson Globe served as the competition arena and Annexet as the training rink. In June 2014, Annexet was iced over for the first time since 1989.

== Qualification ==
Skaters were eligible for the event if they represented a European member nation of the International Skating Union and had reached the age of 15 before 1 July 2014 in their place of birth. The corresponding competition for non-European skaters is the 2015 Four Continents Championships. National associations selected their entries according to their own criteria, but the ISU mandated that their selections must achieve a minimum technical elements score (TES) at an international event prior to the European Championships.

=== Minimum TES ===
Minimum technical scores (TES)
Discipline	SP / SD	FS / FD
Men	25	45
Ladies	20	36
Pairs	20	36
Ice dance	19	29
Must be achieved at an ISU-recognized international event in the ongoing or preceding season. SP and FS scores may be attained at different events.

=== Number of entries per discipline ===
Based on the results of the 2014 European Championships, the ISU allowed each country one to three entries per discipline.

Spots	Men	Ladies	Pairs	Dance
3	Russia; Czech Republic	Russia; Italy	Russia; Italy	Italy; Russia
2	Spain; Germany; France; Belgium; Israel	France; Estonia; Germany; Sweden; Georgia	France; Germany; Israel; Estonia; United Kingdom	United Kingdom; Azerbaijan; Germany; Lithuania; France; Spain
If not listed above, one entry is allowed.

== Entries ==
Countries began announcing their entries in early December 2014 and the ISU published a complete list of competitors on 11 January 2015:

Country	Men	Ladies	Pairs	Ice dancing
Armenia	Slavik Hayrapetyan	Anastasia Galustyan		
Austria	Manuel Koll	Kerstin Frank	Miriam Ziegler / Severin Kiefer	Barbora Silná / Juri Kurakin
Azerbaijan	Larry Loupolover			
Belarus	Pavel Ignatenko	Janina Makeenka	Maria Paliakova / Nikita Bochkov	Viktoria Kavaliova / Yurii Bieliaiev
Belgium				Cecile Postiaux / Richard Postiaux
Bulgaria		Daniela Stoeva	Elizaveta Makarova / Leri Kenchadze	
Czech Republic	Michal Březina; Petr Coufal; Pavel Kaška	Eliška Březinová		Cortney Mansour / Michal Češka
Denmark	Justus Strid	Pernille Sørensen		Laurence Fournier Beaudry / Nikolaj Sørensen
Estonia	Samuel Koppel	Gerli Liinamäe; Helery Hälvin		Irina Shtork / Taavi Rand
Finland	Valtter Virtanen	Kiira Korpi		Olesia Karmi / Max Lindholm
France	Florent Amodio; Chafik Besseghier	Laurine Lecavelier; Maé-Bérénice Méité	Vanessa James / Morgan Ciprès	Gabriella Papadakis / Guillaume Cizeron
Georgia	Armen Agaian	Elene Gedevanishvili		Tatiana Kozmava / Aleksandr Zolotarev
Germany	Peter Liebers; Franz Streubel	Nicole Schott; Nathalie Weinzierl	Minerva Fabienne Hase / Nolan Seegert; Mari Vartmann / Aaron Van Cleave	Jennifer Urban / Sevan Leche; Nelli Zhiganshina / Alexander Gazsi
Great Britain	Phillip Harris	Karly Robertson	Amani Fancy / Christopher Boyadji; Caitlin Yankowskas / Hamish Gaman	Penny Coomes / Nicholas Buckland; Olivia Smart / Joseph Buckland
Hungary		Ivett Tóth		Carolina Moscheni / Ádám Lukács
Israel	Oleksii Bychenko; Daniel Samohin	Netta Schreiber		Allison Reed / Vasili Rogov
Italy	Ivan Righini	Micol Cristini; Roberta Rodeghiero; Giada Russo	Alessandra Cernuschi / Filippo Ambrosini; Nicole Della Monica / Matteo Guarise; Valentina Marchei / Ondřej Hotárek	Anna Cappellini / Luca Lanotte; Charlène Guignard / Marco Fabbri; Misato Komatsubara / Andrea Fabbri
Latvia		Angelina Kučvaļska		Olga Jakushina / Andrey Nevskiy
Lithuania		Aleksandra Golovkina		Taylor Tran / Saulius Ambrulevičius
Luxembourg		Fleur Maxwell		
Netherlands		Niki Wories		
Norway	Sondre Oddvoll Bøe	Camilla Gjersem		
Poland	Patrick Myzyk	Agata Kryger		Natalia Kaliszek / Maksym Spodyriev
Romania	Zoltán Kelemen	Julia Sauter		
Russia	Maxim Kovtun; Adian Pitkeev; Sergei Voronov	Anna Pogorilaya; Elena Radionova; Elizaveta Tuktamysheva	Yuko Kavaguti / Alexander Smirnov; Ksenia Stolbova / Fedor Klimov; Evgenia Tarasova / Vladimir Morozov	Elena Ilinykh / Ruslan Zhiganshin; Ksenia Monko / Kirill Khaliavin; Alexandra Stepanova / Ivan Bukin
Slovenia		Daša Grm		
Slovakia	Marco Klepoch	Nicole Rajičová		Federica Testa / Lukáš Csölley
Spain	Javier Fernández; Javier Raya	Sonia Lafuente		Sara Hurtado / Adrià Díaz; Celia Robledo / Luis Fenero
Sweden	Alexander Majorov	Joshi Helgesson; Viktoria Helgesson		
Switzerland	Stéphane Walker	Eveline Brunner		Katarina Paice / Yuri Yeremenko
Turkey	Engin Ali Artan	Birce Atabey		Alisa Agafonova / Alper Uçar
Ukraine	Yaroslav Paniot	Natalia Popova		Oleksandra Nazarova / Maxim Nikitin

== Results ==
=== Men ===
Rank	Name	Nation	Total points	SP		FS	
1	Javier Fernández	Spain	262.49	1	89.24	1	173.25
2	Maxim Kovtun	Russia	235.68	4	78.21	2	157.47
3	Sergei Voronov	Russia	233.05	2	81.06	3	151.99
4	Oleksii Bychenko	Israel	220.22	7	73.63	4	146.59
5	Michal Březina	Czech Republic	220.11	3	80.86	7	139.25
6	Peter Liebers	Germany	213.57	5	75.48	8	138.09
7	Adian Pitkeev	Russia	210.87	9	69.78	6	141.09
8	Ivan Righini	Italy	210.75	11	67.45	5	143.30
9	Florent Amodio	France	210.11	6	74.06	10	136.05
10	Daniel Samohin	Israel	209.93	8	72.65	9	137.28
11	Alexander Majorov	Sweden	202.57	10	68.10	11	134.47
12	Petr Coufal	Czech Republic	187.82	16	57.47	12	130.35
13	Franz Streubel	Germany	186.18	13	64.45	13	121.73
14	Javier Raya	Spain	173.70	21	53.80	14	119.90
15	Phillip Harris	Great Britain	173.67	12	65.16	17	108.51
16	Yaroslav Paniot	Ukraine	171.24	14	63.25	18	107.99
17	Pavel Kaška	Czech Republic	166.06	17	56.83	15	109.23
18	Valtter Virtanen	Finland	164.80	15	58.31	19	106.49
19	Justus Strid	Denmark	162.05	22	53.28	16	108.77
20	Patrick Myzyk	Poland	159.73	18	56.12	20	103.61
21	Pavel Ignatenko	Belarus	156.41	19	55.79	21	100.62
22	Sondre Oddvoll Bøe	Norway	155.27	20	55.73	22	99.54
23	Larry Loupolover	Azerbaijan	139.29	23	51.01	23	88.28
WD	Chafik Besseghier	France	withdrew	24	49.61	withdrew	
Did not advance to free skating
25	Slavik Hayrapetyan	Armenia	48.93	25	48.93	—N/a	
26	Stéphane Walker	Switzerland	48.86	26	48.86	—N/a	
27	Engin Ali Artan	Turkey	48.76	27	48.76	—N/a	
28	Samuel Koppel	Estonia	46.36	28	46.36	—N/a	
29	Marco Klepoch	Slovakia	44.81	29	44.81	—N/a	
30	Manuel Koll	Austria	43.56	30	43.56	—N/a	

=== Ladies ===
Rank	Name	Nation	Total points	SP		FS	
1	Elizaveta Tuktamysheva	Russia	210.40	2	69.02	1	141.38
2	Elena Radionova	Russia	209.54	1	70.46	2	139.08
3	Anna Pogorilaya	Russia	191.81	3	66.10	3	125.71
4	Joshi Helgesson	Sweden	169.07	6	59.55	4	109.52
5	Viktoria Helgesson	Sweden	166.39	5	60.37	6	106.02
6	Maé-Bérénice Méité	France	156.47	7	55.84	9	100.63
7	Angelina Kučvaļska	Latvia	156.37	17	49.28	5	107.09
8	Roberta Rodeghiero	Italy	154.52	11	51.79	7	102.73
9	Nicole Schott	Germany	153.63	9	52.03	8	101.60
10	Laurine Lecavelier	France	151.43	13	51.58	10	99.85
11	Nicole Rajičová	Slovakia	149.44	8	53.78	12	95.66
12	Nathalie Weinzierl	Germany	148.78	15	50.80	11	97.98
13	Anastasia Galustyan	Armenia	147.18	12	51.78	14	95.40
14	Eveline Brunner	Switzerland	143.97	10	52.00	15	91.97
15	Eliška Březinová	Czech Republic	143.05	21	47.40	13	95.65
16	Natalia Popova	Ukraine	138.27	18	49.21	16	89.06
17	Kerstin Frank	Austria	133.72	16	50.74	19	82.98
18	Sonia Lafuente	Spain	131.60	20	48.53	18	83.07
19	Aleksandra Golovkina	Lithuania	131.47	23	45.01	17	86.46
20	Fleur Maxwell	Luxembourg	128.47	14	51.36	22	77.11
21	Camilla Gjersem	Norway	128.10	22	46.82	20	81.28
22	Gerli Liinamäe	Estonia	124.31	24	44.46	21	79.85
23	Elene Gedevanishvili	Georgia	122.88	19	49.20	23	73.68
WD	Kiira Korpi	Finland	withdrew	4	60.60	withdrew	
Did not advance to free skating
25	Birce Atabey	Turkey	44.17	25	44.17	—N/a	
26	Karly Robertson	Great Britain	43.91	26	43.91	—N/a	
27	Pernille Sørensen	Denmark	43.60	27	43.60	—N/a	
28	Giada Russo	Italy	43.13	28	43.13	—N/a	
29	Daša Grm	Slovenia	43.10	29	43.10	—N/a	
30	Helery Halvin	Estonia	43.10	30	43.10	—N/a	
31	Niki Wories	Netherlands	42.53	31	42.53	—N/a	
32	Netta Schreiber	Israel	42.45	32	42.45	—N/a	
33	Ivett Tóth	Hungary	39.16	33	39.16	—N/a	
34	Micol Cristini	Italy	38.43	34	38.43	—N/a	
35	Julia Sauter	Romania	36.70	35	36.70	—N/a	
36	Daniela Stoeva	Bulgaria	35.70	36	35.70	—N/a	
37	Janina Makeenka	Belarus	33.78	37	33.78	—N/a	
38	Agata Kryger	Poland	29.34	38	29.34	—N/a	

=== Pairs ===
Rank	Name	Nation	Total	SP		FS	
1	Yuko Kavaguti / Alexander Smirnov	Russia	207.67	2	69.86	1	137.81
2	Ksenia Stolbova / Fedor Klimov	Russia	201.11	1	71.38	2	129.73
3	Evgenia Tarasova / Vladimir Morozov	Russia	183.02	5	57.13	3	125.89
4	Valentina Marchei / Ondřej Hotárek	Italy	175.39	4	57.95	4	117.44
5	Vanessa James / Morgan Ciprès	France	167.29	3	60.13	6	107.16
6	Nicole Della Monica / Matteo Guarise	Italy	155.77	8	48.43	5	107.34
7	Mari Vartmann / Aaron Van Cleave	Germany	155.27	6	54.36	7	100.91
8	Miriam Ziegler / Severin Kiefer	Austria	136.80	9	43.79	8	93.01
9	Caitlin Yankowskas / Hamish Gaman	Great Britain	123.42	7	49.29	14	74.13
10	Alessandra Cernuschi / Filippo Ambrosini	Italy	123.19	13	39.70	9	83.49
11	Minerva Fabienne Hase / Nolan Seegert	Germany	121.29	11	42.13	10	79.16
12	Amani Fancy / Christopher Boyadji	Great Britain	118.92	12	41.13	12	77.79
13	Elizaveta Makarova / Leri Kenchadze	Bulgaria	117.65	14	39.00	11	78.65
14	Maria Paliakova / Nikita Bochkov	Belarus	117.52	10	42.58	13	74.94

=== Ice dancing ===
Rank	Name	Nation	Total points	SD		FD	
1	Gabriella Papadakis / Guillaume Cizeron	France	179.97	1	71.06	1	108.91
2	Anna Cappellini / Luca Lanotte	Italy	171.52	3	69.63	2	101.89
3	Alexandra Stepanova / Ivan Bukin	Russia	160.95	4	64.95	3	96.00
4	Elena Ilinykh / Ruslan Zhiganshin	Russia	159.83	2	69.94	8	89.89
5	Sara Hurtado / Adrià Díaz	Spain	155.81	6	62.59	4	93.22
6	Charlène Guignard / Marco Fabbri	Italy	154.61	7	62.10	5	92.51
7	Nelli Zhiganshina / Alexander Gazsi	Germany	152.57	8	61.98	7	90.59
8	Federica Testa / Lukáš Csölley	Slovakia	150.57	5	62.91	10	87.66
9	Laurence Fournier Beaudry / Nikolaj Sørensen	Denmark	150.53	9	61.69	9	88.84
10	Ksenia Monko / Kirill Khaliavin	Russia	149.29	11	58.34	6	90.95
11	Oleksandra Nazarova / Maxim Nikitin	Ukraine	139.02	12	54.66	11	84.36
12	Alisa Agafonova / Alper Uçar	Turkey	137.47	13	53.27	12	84.20
13	Irina Shtork / Taavi Rand	Estonia	132.18	14	52.01	13	80.17
14	Natalia Kaliszek / Maksym Spodyriev	Poland	131.13	15	51.69	14	79.44
15	Carolina Moscheni / Ádám Lukács	Hungary	127.43	16	51.44	16	75.99
16	Allison Reed / Vasili Rogov	Israel	125.38	17	49.74	17	75.64
17	Cortney Mansour / Michal Češka	Czech Republic	124.51	19	47.33	15	77.18
18	Barbora Silná / Juri Kurakin	Austria	124.46	18	49.27	18	75.19
19	Olesia Karmi / Max Lindholm	Finland	121.29	20	46.98	19	74.31
WD	Penny Coomes / Nicholas Buckland	Great Britain	withdrew	10	60.16	withdrew	
Did not advance to free dance
21	Jennifer Urban / Sevan Lerche	Germany	43.07	21	43.07	—N/a	
22	Celia Robledo / Luis Fenero	Spain	42.89	22	42.89	—N/a	
23	Misato Komatsubara / Andrea Fabbri	Italy	42.83	23	42.83	—N/a	
24	Taylor Tran / Saulius Ambrulevičius	Lithuania	42.72	24	42.72	—N/a	
25	Viktoria Kavaliova / Yurii Bieliaiev	Belarus	42.40	25	42.40	—N/a	
26	Olga Jakushina / Andrey Nevskiy	Latvia	40.40	26	40.40	—N/a	
27	Tatiana Kozmava / Aleksandr Zolotarev	Georgia	40.20	27	40.20	—N/a	
28	Cecile Postiaux / Richard Postiaux	Belgium	37.37	28	37.37	—N/a	
29	Katarina Paice / Yuri Eremenko	Switzerland	30.32	29	30.32	—N/a	
WD	Olivia Smart / Joseph Buckland	Great Britain	withdrew	withdrew from competition			

== Medals summary ==
=== Medals by country ===
Table of medals for overall placement:

Rank	Nation	Gold	Silver	Bronze	Total
1	Russia (RUS)	2	3	4	9
2	France (FRA)	1	0	0	1
2	Spain (ESP)	1	0	0	1
4	Italy (ITA)	0	1	0	1
Totals (4 entries)		4	4	4	12

Table of small medals for placement in the short segment:

Rank	Nation	Gold	Silver	Bronze	Total
1	Russia (RUS)	2	4	1	7
2	France (FRA)	1	0	1	2
3	Spain (ESP)	1	0	0	1
4	Czech Republic (CZE)	0	0	1	1
4	Italy (ITA)	0	0	1	1
Totals (5 entries)		4	4	4	12

Table of small medals for placement in the free segment:

Rank	Nation	Gold	Silver	Bronze	Total
1	Russia (RUS)	2	3	4	9
2	France (FRA)	1	0	0	1
2	Spain (ESP)	1	0	0	1
4	Italy (ITA)	0	1	0	1
Totals (4 entries)		4	4	4	12

=== Medalists ===
Medals for overall placement

Discipline	Gold	Silver	Bronze
Men	(Spain) Javier Fernández	(Russia) Maxim Kovtun	(Russia) Sergei Voronov
Ladies	(Russia) Elizaveta Tuktamysheva	(Russia) Elena Radionova	(Russia) Anna Pogorilaya
Pairs	(Russia) Yuko Kavaguti / Alexander Smirnov	(Russia) Ksenia Stolbova / Fedor Klimov	(Russia) Evgenia Tarasova / Vladimir Morozov
Ice dance	(France) Gabriella Papadakis / Guillaume Cizeron	(Italy) Anna Cappellini / Luca Lanotte	(Russia) Alexandra Stepanova / Ivan Bukin

Small medals for placement in the short segment

Discipline	Gold	Silver	Bronze
Men	(Spain) Javier Fernández	(Russia) Sergei Voronov	(Czech Republic) Michal Březina
Ladies	(Russia) Elena Radionova	(Russia) Elizaveta Tuktamysheva	(Russia) Anna Pogorilaya
Pairs	(Russia) Ksenia Stolbova / Fedor Klimov	(Russia) Yuko Kavaguti / Alexander Smirnov	(France) Vanessa James / Morgan Ciprès
Ice dance	(France) Gabriella Papadakis / Guillaume Cizeron	(Russia) Elena Ilinykh / Ruslan Zhiganshin	(Italy) Anna Cappellini / Luca Lanotte

Small medals for placement in the free segment

Discipline	Gold	Silver	Bronze
Men	(Spain) Javier Fernández	(Russia) Maxim Kovtun	(Russia) Sergei Voronov
Ladies	(Russia) Elizaveta Tuktamysheva	(Russia) Elena Radionova	(Russia) Anna Pogorilaya
Pairs	(Russia) Yuko Kavaguti / Alexander Smirnov	(Russia) Ksenia Stolbova / Fedor Klimov	(Russia) Evgenia Tarasova / Vladimir Morozov
Ice dance	(France) Gabriella Papadakis / Guillaume Cizeron	(Italy) Anna Cappellini / Luca Lanotte	(Russia) Alexandra Stepanova / Ivan Bukin
