= Andrea Fabbri =

Italian ice dancer

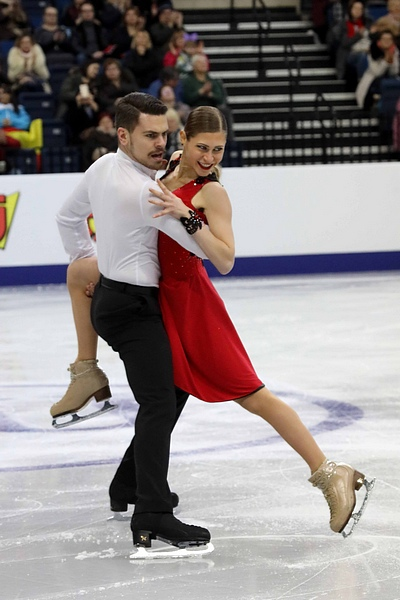
- Fabbri/Moscheni at the 2019 European Championships

Personal information
- Born: 5 October 1992 (age 34) Milan, Italy
- Home town: Milan, Italy
- Height: 1.75 m (5 ft 9 in)

Figure skating career
- Country: Italy
- Partner: Carolina Moscheni
- Coach: Barbara Fusar-Poli
- Skating club: Agora Skating Team
- Began skating: 1999
- Retired: 13 June 2019

Medal record
Italian Championships
Bronze medal – third place	2015 Turin	Ice dance
Bronze medal – third place	2016 Turin	Ice dance
Bronze medal – third place	2019 Trento	Ice dance

Andrea Fabbri (born 5 October 1992) is an Italian former ice dancer, who competed with Carolina Moscheni for Italy. Moscheni/Fabbri are the 2019 Italian national bronze medalists.

With his previous partner Misato Komatsubara, he won five international medals, including silver at the 2015 CS Ice Challenge.

== Personal life ==
Andrea Fabbri was born on 5 October 1992 in Milan. He is the brother of Marco Fabbri.

== Career ==
=== Early years ===
Fabbri began learning to skate in 1999. With partner Alessia Busi, he won the junior silver medal at the 2012 and 2013 Italian Championships. The duo finished 17th at the 2013 World Junior Championships.

=== Partnership with Komatsubara ===
Fabbri and Japan's Misato Komatsubara represented Italy on the senior level. Their international debut came in October 2014 at the Ondrej Nepela Trophy, a Challenger Series (CS) event where they finished 6th. After winning bronze medals at the Santa Claus Cup and Italian Championships, they were sent to the 2015 European Championships in Stockholm, where they placed 23rd. The two ended their season with gold at the Bavarian Open.

In 2015–16, Komatsubara/Fabbri took bronze at the Lombardia Trophy and then appeared at two Challenger Series events, winning silver at the Ice Challenge. After obtaining another silver medal, at the Santa Claus Cup, they repeated as national bronze medalists and went on to compete at the 2016 European Championships in Bratislava, where they finished 21st. They were coached by Barbara Fusar-Poli and Stefano Caruso in Milan, Italy.

Komatsubara and Fabbri ended their partnership in April 2016.

=== Partnership with Moscheni ===
Fabbri began competing with Carolina Moscheni in the 2017–18 figure skating season. They placed fourth at their first Italian national championships in Milan.

In the 2018-19 season, Moscheni/Fabbri won the bronze medal at the 2019 Italian Championships. This qualified them to compete at the 2019 European Championships. In Minsk, they placed twenty-first in the rhythm dance, missing the free dance by 0.72 points. They ended their season at the Egna Dance Trophy in February, where they finished fourth overall.

On June 13, 2019, Moscheni posted on social media that Fabbri had retired from figure skating.

== Programs ==
=== With Moscheni ===
Season	Rhythm dance	Free dance
2018-2019	Tango: Vuelvo al sur by Juan Cáceres; Tango: Epoca by Gotan Project; Tango: Assassin's Tango (from "Mr. and Mrs. Smith") by John Powell	Charms (from "W.E." soundtrack) by Abel Korzeniowski; Bound to You by Christina Aguilera; Dance For Me Wallis (from "W.E." soundtrack) by Abel Korzeniowski
2017–2018	Samba, Rhumba: Historia de un Amor by Ernesto Lecuona	I Put a Spell on You performed by Annie Lennox; Uptown Funk by Mark Ronson and Bruno Mars

=== With Komatsubara ===
Season	Short dance	Free dance
2015–2016	La traviata by Giuseppe Verdi; Waltz: Libiamo ne' lieti calici; Polka: Dell'invito trascorsa è già l'ora	Dolencias; Sikuriadas by Inti-Illimani
2014–2015	Dancers of the Night by Guido Luciani; Paso Nr. 6 performed by André Rieu	Unchain My Heart by Joe Cocker; It's a Man's Man's Man's World by James Brown, Luciano Pavarotti; Walking By Myself by Gary Moore

=== With Busi ===
Season	Short dance	Free dance
2012–2013	Bei Mir Bistu Shein	Bohemian Rhapsody; Don't Stop Me Now by Queen

== Competitive highlights ==
CS: Challenger Series; JGP: Junior Grand Prix

=== With Moscheni ===
International
Event	2017–18	2018–19
Europeans		21st
CS Alpen Trophy		9th
CS Lombardia Trophy		7th
Bosphorus Cup		4th
Egna Dance Trophy		4th
Halloween Cup		6th
International Cup of Nice	14th	
NRW Trophy		4th
Open d'Andorra	7th	
Volvo Open Cup		8th
National
Italian Champ.	4th	3rd

=== With Komatsubara ===
International
Event	2014–15	2015–16
European Champ.	23rd	21st
CS Denkova-Staviski Cup		4th
CS Ice Challenge	5th	2nd
CS Nepela Trophy	6th	
Bavarian Open	1st	
Lombardia Trophy		3rd
Santa Claus Cup	3rd	2nd
National
Italian Champ.	3rd	3rd

=== With Busi ===
International
Event	2011–12	2012–13
World Junior Champ.		17th
JGP Austria	11th	12th
JGP Italy	12th	
JGP Slovenia		9th
Bavarian Open	6th J	3rd J
NRW Trophy	7th J	
Pavel Roman Memorial		7th J
National
Italian Champ.	2nd J	2nd J
J = Junior level
