= Eveline Brunner =

Swiss figure skater

Personal information
- Born: 27 January 1996 (age 30) Pittsburgh, Pennsylvania, United States
- Home town: Zollikerberg, Canton of Zürich, Switzerland
- Height: 1.60 m (5 ft 3 in)

Figure skating career
- Country: Switzerland
- Coach: Gheorghe Chiper, Zoltán Kelemen
- Skating club: ESCZ Zürich
- Began skating: 2001
- Retired: April 9, 2015

Medal record
Swiss Championships
Gold medal – first place	2015 Lugano	Singles

Eveline Brunner (born 27 January 1996) is a Swiss former competitive figure skater. In the 2014–15 season, she won bronze at the Merano Cup and gold at the Swiss Championships. She was subsequently named in the Swiss team to the 2015 European Championships in Stockholm. Brunner reached the free skate and finished 14th overall in Sweden. She placed 33rd at the 2015 World Championships in Shanghai, China. On April 9, 2015, she retired from competition.

== Programs ==
Season	Short program	Free skating
2014–15	Nocturne No. 9, op. 1 by Frédéric Chopin	Duke's Place by Ella Fitzgerald

== Competitive highlights ==
JGP: Junior Grand Prix

International
Event	2012–13	2013–14	2014–15
World Champ.			33rd
European Champ.			14th
Bavarian Open			7th
Challenge Cup			4th
Cup of Nice			9th
Merano Cup			3rd
Coupe du Printemps	10th	4th	
International: Junior
JGP France			14th
National
Swiss Champ.	11th	5th	1st
