= Carolina Moscheni =

Italian ice dancer

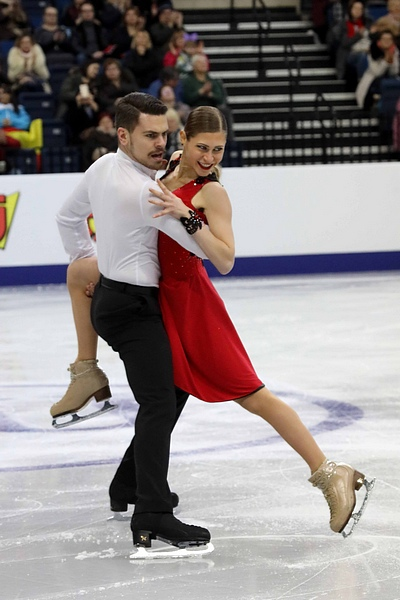
- Fabbri/Moscheni at the 2019 European Championships

Personal information
- Born: 23 May 1996 (age 30) Bergamo, Italy
- Height: 1.68 m (5 ft 6 in)

Figure skating career
- Country: Italy
- Coach: Barbara Fusar-Poli, Igor Shpilband, Greg Zuerlein
- Skating club: DSC-SI Debrecen
- Began skating: 2005
- Retired: 17 July 2022

Medal record
Italian Championships
Silver medal – second place	2021 Egna	Ice dance
Silver medal – second place	2022 Turin	Ice dance
Bronze medal – third place	2019 Trento	Ice dance

Carolina Moscheni (born 23 May 1996) is a retired Italian ice dancer. With previous partner Francesco Fioretti, she was a two-time Italian national silver medalist (2021, 2022). With previous partner Andrea Fabbri, she was the 2019 Italian national bronze medalist.

She previously represented Hungary, first with partner Ádám Lukács, with whom she placed fourteenth at the 2014 World Junior Championships; and subsequently, briefly, with Balázs Major.

== Personal life ==
Moscheni was born on 23 May 1996 in Bergamo, Italy.

She became engaged to longtime boyfriend and pair skater, Matteo Guarise, in 2022. They married on New Year's Eve in 2023. In September 2025, their son, Tommaso, was born.

== Career ==
In the 2010–11 season, Moscheni skated for Italy with Giorgio Savoldi on the novice level. The following season, she competed as a junior with Igor Ogay.

Moscheni teamed up with Hungarian ice dancer Ádám Lukács in May 2012. Barbara Fusar-Poli in Milan and Igor Shpilband in Novi, Michigan became their coaches.

Moscheni/Lukács began competing internationally for Hungary in the 2013–14 season. They won the 2014 Hungarian national junior title and were sent to the 2014 World Junior Championships in Sofia, Bulgaria. They qualified for the free dance and finished 14th overall. On 30 August 2015, Moscheni and Lukács announced the end of their partnership.

For the 2015–16 season, Moscheni competed with Balázs Major. Moscheni/Major placed seventh at the 2015 CS Golden Spin of Zagreb, and twenty-seventh at the 2016 European Championships. Following the European Championships, Moscheni and Lukács announced that they would resume skating together. However, they did not return to competition.

Moscheni returned to her native Italy subsequently, and began competing with Andrea Fabbri in the 2017–18 figure skating season. They placed fourth at their first Italian national championships in Milan.

In the 2018–19 season, Moscheni/Fabbri won the bronze medal at the 2019 Italian Championships. This qualified them to compete at the 2019 European Championships. In Minsk, they placed twenty-first in the rhythm dance, missing the free dance by 0.72 points. They ended their season at the Egna Dance Trophy in February, where they finished fourth overall.

Following the end of her partnership with Fabbri, Moscheni formed a new partnership with Francesco Fioretti. In their debut season, they won the silver medal at the Italian Championships, and placed twenty-fifth at the 2021 World Championships in Stockholm.

They were sixteenth at the 2021 CS Lombardia Trophy, their season debut. They were originally on the roster for the 2021 CS Nebelhorn Trophy, but were later replaced. After Italy was designated to host a special Gran Premio d'Italia on the 2021–22 Grand Prix, Moscheni/Fioretti were named as replacements for a withdrawn team to make their Grand Prix debut on home soil. They placed twelfth at the event. They were twenty-first at their inaugural European Championships appearance, missing the cut for the free dance. They finished the season twenty-sixth at the World Championships, missing the free dance there as well.

On 17 July 2022, Moscheni announced her retirement from figure skating.

== Programs ==
=== With Fioretti ===
Season	Rhythm dance	Free dance
2020–2021	Quickstep: A Lovely Night; Waltz: Planetarium; Quickstep: Someone in the Crowd (from La La Land) by Justin Hurwitz, Benj Pasek, Justin Paul	Piano Concerto No. 2 by Sergei Rachmaninoff performed by David Garrett; The Fire Within by Jennifer Thomas

=== With Fabbri ===
Season	Rhythm dance	Free dance
2018–2019	Tango: Vuelvo al sur by Juan Cáceres; Tango: Epoca by Gotan Project; Tango: Assassin's Tango (from Mr. and Mrs. Smith) by John Powell	Charms (from W.E.) by Abel Korzeniowski; Bound to You by Christina Aguilera; Dance For Me Wallis (from W.E.) by Abel Korzeniowski
2017–2018	Samba, Rhumba: Historia de un Amor by Ernesto Lecuona	I Put a Spell on You performed by Annie Lennox; Uptown Funk by Mark Ronson and Bruno Mars

=== With Major ===
Season	Short dance	Free dance
2015–2016	Waltz: Fascination performed by André Rieu; Polka: Hungarian Polka by J. Strauss	Carmen Fantaisie performed by David Garrett; Me voy by Yasmin Levy; Carmen Fantaisie performed by David Garrett

=== With Lukács ===
Season	Short dance	Free dance
2014–2015	Samba: Samba Vocalizado; Cha Cha: Baila Con Rigo performed by Michael Bublé; Samba: Batacuda by DJ Nero	Toccata; Nocturne by Frédéric Chopin; Scherzo by Ludwig van Beethoven all performed by David Garrett
2013–2014	Quickstep: Tu vuò fà l'americano by The Puppini Sisters; Foxtrot: Tu vuò fà l'americano by Renato Carosone; Quickstep: Tu vuò fà l'americano by The Puppini Sisters	Don't Stop 'Til You Get Enough; Earth Song; Wanna Be Startin' Somethin' by Michael Jackson
2012–2013		Casablanca by Max Steiner

== Competitive highlights ==
=== For Italy ===
==== With Fioretti ====
International
Event	20–21	21–22	22–23
Worlds	25th	26th	
Europeans		21st	
GP Italy		10th	
CS Cup of Austria		14th	
CS Golden Spin		WD	
CS Lombardia Trophy		16th	
CS Nebelhorn Trophy		WD	
Egna Trophy	3rd	2nd	
Mezzaluna Cup		3rd	2nd
National
Italian Champ.	2nd	2nd	
TBD = Assigned

==== With Fabbri ====
International
Event	17–18	18–19
Europeans		21st
CS Alpen Trophy		9th
CS Lombardia Trophy		7th
Bosphorus Cup		4th
Egna Dance Trophy		4th
Halloween Cup		6th
International Cup of Nice	14th	
NRW Trophy		4th
Open d'Andorra	7th	
Volvo Open Cup		8th
National
Italian Champ.	4th	3rd

=== For Hungary ===
==== With Major ====
International
Event	15–16
European Championships	27th
CS Golden Spin of Zagreb	7th

==== With Lukács ====
JGP: Junior Grand Prix

International
Event	12–13	13–14	14–15
Worlds			18th
Europeans			15th
International: Junior
Junior Worlds		14th	9th
JGP Croatia			3rd
JGP Czech Republic		6th	
JGP Estonia			5th
JGP Slovakia		6th	
Bavarian Open		4th J.	
Ice Challenge		1st J.	1st J.
Santa Claus Cup			1st J.
National
Hungarian Champ.	3rd J.	1st J.	1st J.
J. = Junior level

=== With Ogay for Italy ===
International
Event	11–12 (with Ogay)
Mont Blanc Trophy	
NRW Trophy	
National
Italian Champ.	3rd J.
