= Tischendorf =

Tischendorf is a German surname. Notable people with the surname include:

- Constantin von Tischendorf (1815–1874), German theologian
- Fridtjof Tischendorf (born 1997), Norwegian snowboarder
- Philipp Tischendorf (born 1988), German figure skater
