= Alessia Busi =

Italian ice dancer (born 1994)

Personal information
- Born: 10 May 1994 (age 32) Milan, Italy
- Home town: Milan, Italy
- Height: 1.70 m (5 ft 7 in)

Figure skating career
- Country: Italy
- Partner: Andrea Fabbri
- Coach: Barbara Fusar-Poli
- Skating club: Agora Skating Team
- Began skating: 2000

Alessia Busi (born 10 May 1994, in Milan) is an Italian ice dancer. With partner Andrea Fabbri, she is a two-time (2012, 2013) Italian national junior silver medalist and finished 17th at the 2013 World Junior Championships.

== Programs ==
(with Fabbri)

Season	Short dance	Free dance
2012–13	Bei Mir Bistu Shein	Bohemian Rhapsody; Don't Stop Me Now by Queen

== Competitive highlights ==
(with Fabbri)

International
Event	2011–12	2012–13
World Junior Champ.		17th
JGP Austria	11th	12th
JGP Italy	12th	
JGP Slovenia		9th
Bavarian Open	6th J	3rd J
NRW Trophy	7th J	
Pavel Roman Memorial		7th J
National
Italian Champ.	2nd J	2nd J
J = Junior level; JGP = Junior Grand Prix
