= Ádám Lukács =

Hungarian ice dancer (born 1996)

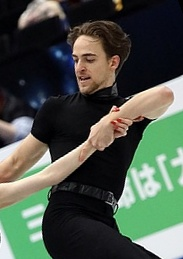

Personal information
- Born: 25 June 1996 (age 30) Budapest, Hungary
- Height: 1.80 m (5 ft 11 in)

Figure skating career
- Country: Hungary
- Partner: Anna Yanovskaya
- Coach: Barbara Fusar-Poli, Igor Shpilband, Greg Zuerlein
- Skating club: DSC-SI Debrecen
- Began skating: 2004

Ádám Lukács (born 25 June 1996) is a Hungarian ice dancer. With his skating partner, Anna Yanovskaya, he is a three-time Hungarian national champion (2018–19, 2021) and has competed in the final segment at three ISU Championships. With his former skating partner, Carolina Moscheni, he placed 14th at the 2014 World Junior Championships.

== Career ==
Lukács began learning to skate in 2004. He competed with Szidónia Merkwart in the 2011–12 season.

=== Partnership with Moscheni ===
Lukács teamed up with Italian ice dancer Carolina Moscheni in May 2012. The two were coached by Barbara Fusar-Poli in Milan and by Igor Shpilband in Novi, Michigan.

Moscheni/Lukács began competing internationally for Hungary in the 2013–14 season. They won the 2014 Hungarian national junior title and were sent to the 2014 World Junior Championships in Sofia, Bulgaria. They qualified for the free dance and finished 14th overall.

On 30 August 2015, Moscheni and Lukács announced the end of their partnership. However, seven months later, they announced they decided to continue skating together.

=== Partnership with Yanovskaya ===
In December 2016, Lukács teamed up with Russia's Anna Yanovskaya to compete for Hungary. Making their competitive debut, the duo placed 12th at the Bavarian Open in February 2017.

== Programs ==
=== With Yanovskaya ===
Season	Short dance	Free dance
2021–2022	Blues: Come Together; Hip Hop: Smooth Criminal by Michael Jackson	Hymne à l'amour performed by Patricia Kaas
2020–2021	Grease	Hymne à l'amour performed by Patricia Kaas
2018–2019	Flamenco: Tango: Armi	Selection of Music by Yellow
2017–2018	Whatever Happens by Michael Jackson; Limbo by Daddy Yankee	The Phantom of the Opera by Andrew Lloyd Webber
2016–2017	Why Don't You Do Right?; Jumping Jack performed by Big Bad Voodoo Daddy	The Phantom of the Opera by Andrew Lloyd Webber

=== With Moscheni ===
Season	Short dance	Free dance
2014–15	Samba: Samba Vocalizado; Cha Cha: Baila Con Rigo performed by Michael Bublé; Samba: Batacuda by DJ Nero	Toccata performed by David Garrett; Nocturne by Frédéric Chopin performed by David Garrett; Scherzo by Ludwig van Beethoven performed by David Garrett
2013–14	Quickstep: Tu vuò fà l'americano by The Puppini Sisters; Foxtrot: Tu vuò fà l'americano by Renato Carosone; Quickstep: Tu vuò fà l'americano by The Puppini Sisters	Don't Stop 'Til You Get Enough; Earth Song; Wanna Be Startin' Somethin' by Michael Jackson
2012–13		Casablanca by Max Steiner

=== With Merkwart ===
Season	Short dance	Free dance
2011–12	Cha cha: Boom Boom by Hayk Harutyunyan	Girls, Girls, Girls; Bei Mir Bistu Shein

== Competitive highlights ==
CS Challenger Series; JGP: Junior Grand Prix

=== With Yanovskaya ===
International
Event	16–17	17–18	18–19	19–20	20–21	21–22
World Champ.		27th	19th		23rd	
European Champ.		14th	19th			
GP Rostelecom Cup			7th		8th	
CS Finlandia Trophy			8th			
CS Golden Spin			5th			
CS Ice Star		7th				
CS Lombardia Trophy						10th
CS Nebelhorn Trophy		12th				6th
Bavarian Open	12th		5th			
Challenge Cup					2nd	
Volvo Open		3rd	6th			
Santa Claus Cup		2nd			WD	
Halloween Cup			1st			
National
Hungarian Champs			1st	1st		
WD = Withdrew; TBD = Assigned

=== With Moscheni ===
International
Event	2012–13	2013–14	2014–15
World Champ.			18th
European Champ.			15th
International: Junior
World Junior Champ.		14th	9th
JGP Croatia			3rd
JGP Czech Republic		6th	
JGP Estonia			5th
JGP Slovakia		6th	
Bavarian Open		4th J	
Ice Challenge		1st J	1st J
Santa Claus Cup			1st J
National
Hungarian Champ.	3rd J	1st J	1st J
J = Junior level

=== With Merkwart ===
International
Event	2011–12
World Junior Championships	16th PR
JGP Austria	18th
Istanbul Cup	8th J
Pavel Roman Memorial	16th J
Santa Claus Cup	13th J
J = Junior level PR = Preliminary round
