= 2013 World Junior Figure Skating Championships =

- Type: ISU Championship
- Date: 25 February – 3 March
- Season: 2012–13
- Location: Milan, Italy
- Host: Skating Union of Italy
- Venue: Agorà Ice Stadium

Champions
- Men's singles: (United States) Joshua Farris
- Ladies' singles: (Russia) Elena Radionova
- Pairs: (United States) Haven Denney / Brandon Frazier
- Ice dance: (Russia) Alexandra Stepanova / Ivan Bukin
- Previous: 2012 World Junior Championships
- Next: 2014 World Junior Championships

The 2013 World Junior Figure Skating Championships was an international figure skating competition in the 2012–13 season. Commonly called "World Juniors" and "Junior Worlds", the event determined the World Junior champions in the disciplines of men's singles, ladies' singles, pair skating, and ice dancing.

The event was held in Milan, Italy from 25 February to 3 March 2013.

== Qualification ==
The competition was open to skaters from ISU member nations who were at least 13 but not 19—or 21 for male pair skaters and ice dancers—before July 1, 2012 in their place of birth. National associations selected their entries according to their own criteria but the ISU mandated that their selections achieve a minimum technical elements score (TES) at an international event prior to the Junior Worlds.

The term "Junior" in ISU competition refers to age, not skill level. Skaters may remain age-eligible for Junior Worlds even after competing nationally and internationally at the senior level. At junior events, the ISU requires that all programs conform to junior-specific rules regarding program length, jumping passes, types of elements, etc.

=== Minimum TES ===
Minimum technical scores (TES)
Discipline	Short	Free
Men	20	40
Ladies	20	35
Pairs	20	30
Ice dancing	17	27
Must be achieved at an ISU-recognized international event in the ongoing or preceding season. SP and FS scores may be attained at different events.

=== Number of entries per discipline ===
Based on the results of the 2012 World Junior Championships, the ISU allowed each country one to three entries per discipline. Countries which qualified more than one entry in a discipline:

Spots	Men	Ladies	Pairs	Dance
3	China; United States	Russia; United States	Canada; China; Russia; United States	Russia; United States
2	Canada; Japan; Kazakhstan; Russia	Canada; China; Japan; South Korea; Sweden		Canada; France; Germany; Italy; Ukraine

If not listed above, one entry was allowed.

== Entries ==
Member nations selected the following entries:

Country	Men	Ladies	Pairs	Ice dancing
Armenia	Slavik Hayrapetyan			
Australia	David Kranjec	Brooklee Han		
Austria		Sabrina Schulz		Christine Smith / Simon Eisenbauer
Belarus	Pavel Ignatenko	Kristina Zakharanka		Viktoria Kavaliova / Yurii Bieliaiev
Belgium				Laura Abts / Maarten Buckens
Brazil	Luiz Manella	Isadora Williams		
Bulgaria	Iassen Petkov	Anna Afonkina		Slavyana Tsenova / Egor Zaytsev
Canada	Mitchell Gordon; Nam Nguyen	Alaine Chartrand; Gabrielle Daleman	Hayleigh Bell / Alistair Sylvester; Brittany Jones / Ian Beharry; Margaret Purdy / Michael Marinaro	Mackenzie Bent / Garrett MacKeen; Madeline Edwards / Zhao Kai Pang
China	Jin Boyang; Zhang He	Guo Xiaowen; Zhao Ziquan	Li Meiyi / Jiang Bo; Yu Xiaoyu / Jin Yang	Zhang Yiyi / Wu Nan
Chinese Taipei	Chih-I Tsao			
Czech Republic	Petr Coufal	Elizaveta Ukolova		Karolina Prochazkova / Michal Ceska
Denmark		Pernille Sorensen		
Estonia		Gerli Liinamäe		Johanna Allik / Paul Bellantuono
Finland	Matthias Versluis	Jenni Saarinen		Sara Aghai / Jussiville Partanen
France	Simon Hocquaux	Laurine Lecavelier		Estelle Elizabeth / Romain Le Gac; Gabriella Papadakis / Guillaume Cizeron
Germany	Martin Rappe	Nathalie Weinzierl	Annabelle Prölss / Ruben Blommaert	Shari Koch / Christian Nüchtern; Ria Schiffner / Julian Salatzki
(United Kingdom) Great Britain	Jamie Whiteman	Amani Fancy		Olivia Smart / Joseph Buckland
Greece				Carina Glastris / Nicholas Lettner
Hungary	Kristóf Forgó	Ivett Tóth		
Israel		Netta Schreiber		Anna Bolshem / Ronald Zilberberg
Italy	Antonio Panfili	Sara Casella	Giulia Foresti / Leo Luca Sforza	Alessia Busi / Andrea Fabbri; Sofia Sforza / Francesco Fioretti
Japan	Ryuju Hino; Shoma Uno	Rika Hongo; Satoko Miyahara		
Latvia		Angelina Kučvaļska		Olga Jakushina / Aleksandrs Grishins
Lithuania		Aleksandra Golovkina		
Malaysia	Julian Zhi Jie Yee			
Netherlands			Rachel Epstein / Dmitry Epstein	
Norway	Sondre Oddvoll Boe	Camilla Gjersem		
Philippines	Michael Christian Martinez	Alisson Krystle Perticheto		
Poland	Kamil Dymowski	Agata Kryger	Marcelina Lech / Jakub Tyc	Joanna Zając / Cezary Zawadski
Romania	Cătălin Dimitrescu			
Russia	Mikhail Kolyada; Alexander Samarin	Yulia Lipnitskaya; Anna Pogorilaya; Elena Radionova	Lina Fedorova / Maxim Miroshkin; Kamilla Gainetdinova / Ivan Bich; Evgenia Tarasova / Vladimir Morozov	Evgenia Kosigina / Nikolai Moroshkin; Alexandra Stepanova / Ivan Bukin; Valeria Zenkova / Valerie Sinitsin
Slovakia	Marco Klepoch	Nicole Rajicova		
Slovenia		Patricia Glescic		
South Korea	Lee June-hyoung	Kim Hae-jin; Park So-youn		Rebeka Kim / Kirill Minov
Spain	Victor Bustamante	Marta Garcia		Celia Robledo / Luis Fenero
Sweden	Ondrej Spiegl	Rebecka Emanuelsson; Josefine Taljegard		
Switzerland	Nicola Todeschini	Laure Nicodet		
Turkey	Giray Senol	Melisa Sema Atik		Cagla Demirsal / Berk Akalin
Ukraine	Ivan Pavlov	Anna Khnychenkova	Julia Lavrentieva / Yuri Rudyk	Oleksandra Nazarova / Maxim Nikitin; Lolita Yermak / Oleksiy Khimich
United States	Jason Brown; Joshua Farris; Shotaro Omori	Samantha Cesario; Courtney Hicks; Yasmin Siraj	Jessica Calalang / Zack Sidhu; Haven Denney / Brandon Frazier; Britney Simpson / Matthew Blackmer	Alexandra Aldridge / Daniel Eaton; Kaitlin Hawayek / Jean-Luc Baker; Lorraine McNamara / Quinn Carpenter
Uzbekistan				Anna Nagornyuk / Viktor Kovalenko

China removed Yan Han from the roster, despite having three spots. No reason was given.

== Schedule ==
Subject to changes:

- Wednesday, February 27
  - 11:30–17:10 – Short dance
  - 17:30–17:50 – Opening ceremony
  - 18:15–21:15 – Pairs' short
- Thursday, February 28
  - 11:30–17:40 – Men's short
  - 19:00–21:50 – Pairs' free
- Friday, March 1
  - 10:45–17:45 – Ladies' short
  - 18:45–21:55 – Free dance
- Saturday, March 2
  - 13:00–16:50 – Men's free
  - 18:30–22:15 – Ladies' free
- Sunday, March 3
  - 14:30–17:00 – Exhibitions

== Overview ==
2012 silver medalist Joshua Farris, Shotaro Omori, and Jason Brown, all of the United States, took the top three spots after the men's short program. In the free skating, Farris was second to Brown but finished first overall, Brown moved up from third to take the silver medal, and Omori obtained the bronze. The three Americans produced the first ever sweep of the men's podium at the World Junior Championships.

Samantha Cesario of the United States was first in the ladies' short program, followed by Anna Pogorilaya of Russia and another American Courtney Hicks. Russia's Elena Radionova won the free skating and moved up from fifth to take the gold, Yulia Lipnitskaya climbed from fourth to take silver, and Pogorilaya ended with the bronze. They produced Russia's third sweep of the ladies' podium at Junior Worlds (previously in 1996 and 1998). The sound system failed before the last two skaters, resulting in a thirty-minute interruption.

2012 silver medalists Yu Xiaoyu / Jin Yang of China led after the pairs' short program, with Margaret Purdy / Michael Marinaro of Canada and Haven Denney / Brandon Frazier in second and third respectively. The free skating was delayed by 1 hour and 20 minutes due to a technical problem. Denney / Frazier rose from third to take the gold, Purdy / Marinaro remained in second, and Russia's Lina Fedorova / Maxim Miroshkin climbed from seventh to take the bronze.

2012 silver medalists Alexandra Stepanova / Ivan Bukin of Russia placed first in the short dance, followed by Gabriella Papadakis / Guillaume Cizeron of France and Alexandra Aldridge / Daniel Eaton of the United States. Stepanova / Bukin also won the free dance and took gold. Papadakis / Cizeron held on to silver after placing third in the segment. Papadakis sprained her ankle in an off-ice warm up before the morning practice on March 1. She paused the free dance after 2:52 minutes and was allowed a medical break, after which she and Cizeron completed the dance. Aldridge / Eaton were the bronze medalists for the second year in a row.

== Results ==
=== Men ===
Rank	Name	Nation	Total points	SP		FS	
1	Joshua Farris	United States	228.32	1	75.84	2	152.48
2	Jason Brown	United States	224.15	3	70.06	1	154.09
3	Shotaro Omori	United States	204.34	2	70.82	3	133.52
4	Jin Boyang	China	192.58	6	62.82	4	129.76
5	Michael Christian Martinez	Philippines	191.64	4	67.01	7	124.63
6	Mikhail Kolyada	Russia	189.94	8	61.50	5	128.44
7	Shoma Uno	Japan	187.08	7	61.66	6	125.42
8	Alexander Samarin	Russia	186.96	5	63.07	8	123.89
9	Zhang He	China	178.18	9	60.42	11	117.76
10	Ryuju Hino	Japan	176.85	12	57.71	10	119.14
11	Martin Rappe	Germany	174.32	11	59.44	12	114.88
12	Nam Nguyen	Canada	172.58	16	53.43	9	119.15
13	Lee June-hyoung	South Korea	166.21	13	54.15	13	112.06
14	Pavel Ignatenko	Belarus	165.27	10	59.73	16	105.54
15	Luiz Manella	Brazil	161.71	17	52.48	14	109.23
16	Mitchell Gordon	Canada	161.61	15	54.04	15	107.57
17	Simon Hocquaux	France	152.61	14	54.14	19	98.47
18	Victor Bustamante	Spain	151.23	21	49.70	17	101.53
19	Matthias Versluis	Finland	149.66	19	51.01	18	98.65
20	Ivan Pavlov	Ukraine	148.84	18	51.73	20	97.11
21	Slavik Hayrapetyan	Armenia	143.48	23	48.27	21	95.21
22	Antonio Panfili	Italy	136.96	24	46.02	22	90.94
23	Chih-I Tsao	Chinese Taipei	132.84	22	48.57	23	84.27
24	David Kranjec	Australia	130.56	20	50.37	24	80.19
Did not advance to free skating
25	Petr Coufal	Czech Republic		25	43.85		
26	Sondre Oddvoll Boe	Norway		26	43.77		
27	Kamil Dymowski	Poland		27	43.55		
28	Ondrej Spiegl	Sweden		28	42.66		
29	Jamie Whiteman	(United Kingdom) Great Britain		29	42.48		
30	Kristof Forgo	Hungary		30	40.96		
31	Iassen Petkov	Bulgaria		31	40.77		
32	Samuel Koppel	Estonia		32	39.24		
33	Nicola Todeschini	Switzerland		33	39.16		
34	Julian Zhi Jie Yee	Malaysia		34	38.16		
35	Cătălin Dimitrescu	Romania		35	37.61		
36	Marco Klepoch	Slovakia		36	36.85		
37	Giray Senol	Turkey		37	36.64		

=== Ladies ===
Rank	Name	Nation	Total points	SP		FS	
1	Elena Radionova	Russia	169.71	5	53.48	1	116.23
2	Yulia Lipnitskaya	Russia	165.67	4	53.86	2	111.81
3	Anna Pogorilaya	Russia	160.32	2	53.98	3	106.34
4	Samantha Cesario	United States	154.55	1	54.69	4	99.86
5	Courtney Hicks	United States	152.92	3	53.98	5	98.94
6	Gabrielle Daleman	Canada	149.39	8	50.70	6	98.69
7	Satoko Miyahara	Japan	147.42	6	52.16	8	95.26
8	Alaine Chartrand	Canada	144.38	12	48.14	7	96.24
9	Rika Hongo	Japan	142.62	7	52.15	10	90.47
10	Nathalie Weinzierl	Germany	139.10	10	49.97	11	89.13
11	Yasmin Siraj	United States	139.08	13	47.65	9	91.43
12	Park So-youn	South Korea	135.42	14	47.24	12	88.18
13	Laurine Lecavelier	France	131.25	9	50.43	15	80.82
14	Jenni Saarinen	Finland	129.81	19	44.95	13	84.86
15	Zhao Ziquan	China	126.11	20	44.50	14	81.61
16	Brooklee Han	Australia	125.62	15	47.20	17	78.42
17	Anna Khnychenkova	Ukraine	121.62	18	44.96	18	76.66
18	Alisson Krystle Perticheto	Philippines	119.76	24	41.25	16	78.51
19	Kim Hae-jin	South Korea	115.22	11	49.26	21	65.96
20	Angelina Kučvaļska	Latvia	114.11	22	42.11	19	72.00
21	Ivett Tóth	Hungary	113.34	17	46.02	20	67.32
22	Guo Xiaowen	China	107.55	16	46.44	24	61.11
23	Sabrina Schulz	Austria	105.38	23	41.60	22	63.78
24	Josefin Taljegård	Sweden	104.37	21	43.09	23	61.28
Did not advance to free skating
25	Rebecka Emanuelsson	Sweden		25	39.03		
26	Isadora Williams	Brazil		26	38.57		
27	Gerli Liinamäe	Estonia		27	38.10		
28	Patricia Gleščič	Slovenia		28	37.71		
29	Sara Casella	Italy		29	36.74		
30	Nicole Rajicova	Slovakia		30	36.56		
31	Reyna Hamui	Mexico		31	36.15		
32	Netta Schreiber	Israel		32	35.78		
33	Elizaveta Ukolova	Czech Republic		33	35.05		
34	Camilla Gjersem	Norway		34	35.05		
35	Pernille Sørensen	Denmark		35	34.17		
36	Agata Kryger	Poland		36	33.65		
37	Isabella Schuster-Velissariou	Greece		37	33.23		
38	Melisa Sema Atik	Turkey		38	32.58		
39	Aleksandra Golovkina	Lithuania		39	32.34		
40	Marta Garcia	Spain		40	32.01		
41	Amani Fancy	(United Kingdom) Great Britain		41	30.48		
42	Anna Afonkina	Bulgaria		42	30.04		
43	Kristina Zakharanka	Belarus		43	29.65		
44	Laure Nicodet	Switzerland		44	29.10		
45	Kim Bell	Netherlands		45	27.76		

=== Pairs ===
Rank	Name	Nation	Total points	SP		FS	
1	Haven Denney / Brandon Frazier	United States	155.83	3	52.61	2	103.22
2	Margaret Purdy / Michael Marinaro	Canada	154.70	2	53.09	3	101.61
3	Lina Fedorova / Maxim Miroshkin	Russia	154.57	7	49.43	1	105.14
4	Yu Xiaoyu / Jin Yang	China	151.47	1	54.95	5	96.52
5	Evgenia Tarasova / Vladimir Morozov	Russia	148.74	4	52.25	6	96.49
6	Brittany Jones / Ian Beharry	Canada	147.97	5	51.57	7	96.40
7	Annabelle Prölß / Ruben Blommaert	Germany	147.83	6	49.95	4	97.88
8	Kamilla Gainetdinova / Ivan Bich	Russia	135.61	10	42.87	8	92.74
9	Jessica Calalang / Zack Sidhu	United States	133.01	8	45.72	9	87.29
10	Britney Simpson / Matthew Blackmer	United States	121.51	9	43.16	11	78.35
11	Hayleigh Bell / Alistair Sylvester	Canada	120.75	14	40.18	10	80.57
12	Li Meiyi / Jiang Bo	China	116.92	12	41.88	12	75.04
13	Giulia Foresti / Leo Luca Sforza	Italy	113.48	13	40.57	13	72.91
14	Julia Lavrentieva / Yuri Rudyk	Ukraine	113.00	11	42.61	14	70.39
15	Marcelina Lech / Jakub Tyc	Poland	103.64	15	36.30	15	67.34
16	Rachel Epstein / Dmitry Epstein	Netherlands	91.31	16	30.90	16	60.41

=== Ice dancing ===
Rank	Name	Nation	Total points	SD		FD	
1	Alexandra Stepanova / Ivan Bukin	Russia	150.17	1	64.65	1	85.52
2	Gabriella Papadakis / Guillaume Cizeron	France	143.26	2	61.58	3	81.68
3	Alexandra Aldridge / Daniel Eaton	United States	139.33	3	56.89	2	82.44
4	Valeria Zenkova / Valerie Sinitsin	Russia	132.17	5	55.82	4	76.35
5	Mackenzie Bent / Garrett MacKeen	Canada	128.79	4	55.88	7	72.91
6	Evgenia Kosigina / Nikolai Moroshkin	Russia	126.19	9	50.64	5	75.55
7	Kaitlin Hawayek / Jean-Luc Baker	United States	124.35	11	49.63	6	74.72
8	Shari Koch / Christian Nüchtern	Germany	121.71	10	50.59	10	71.12
9	Lorraine McNamara / Quinn Carpenter	United States	121.27	8	51.80	11	69.47
10	Anna Nagornyuk / Viktor Kovalenko	Uzbekistan	120.07	7	52.19	12	67.88
11	Oleksandra Nazarova / Maxim Nikitin	Ukraine	119.15	12	48.03	9	71.12
12	Madeline Edwards / Zhao Kai Pang	Canada	117.65	6	54.92	14	62.73
13	Sofia Sforza / Francesco Fioretti	Italy	116.50	15	44.86	8	71.64
14	Çağla Demirsal / Berk Akalın	Turkey	114.05	14	47.03	13	67.02
15	Estelle Elizabeth / Romain Le Gac	France	102.39	13	47.20	18	55.19
16	Celia Robledo / Luis Fenero	Spain	102.16	20	43.72	15	58.44
17	Alessia Busi / Andrea Fabbri	Italy	102.05	18	44.20	16	57.85
18	Zhang Yiyi / Wu Nan	China	100.72	16	44.71	17	56.01
19	Ria Schiffner / Julian Salatzki	Germany	97.80	19	44.14	19	53.66
20	Rebeka Kim / Kirill Minov	South Korea	96.99	17	44.27	20	52.72
Did not advance to free dance
21	Viktoria Kavaliova / Yurii Bieliaiev	Belarus		21	43.51		
22	Olivia Smart / Joseph Buckland	(United Kingdom) Great Britain		22	42.77		
23	Karolina Prochazkova / Michal Ceska	Czech Republic		23	41.80		
24	Sara Aghai / Jussiville Partanen	Finland		24	41.63		
25	Lolita Yermak / Oleksiy Khimich	Ukraine		25	41.31		
26	Carina Glastris / Nicholas Lettner	Greece		26	36.81		
27	Nicole Kuzmich / Jordan Hockley	Slovenia		27	36.33		
28	Olga Jakushina / Aleksandrs Grishins	Latvia		28	35.92		
29	Joanna Zając / Cezary Zawadski	Poland		29	34.15		
30	Anna Bolshem / Ronald Zilberberg	Israel		30	32.67		
31	Johanna Allik / Paul Michael Bellantuono	Estonia		31	31.95		
32	Christine Smith / Simon Eisenbauer	Austria		32	31.26		
33	Laura Abts / Maarten Buckens	Belgium		33	28.26		
34	Slavyana Tsenova / Egor Zaytsev	Bulgaria		34	27.68		
35	Liliana Kiraly / Szabolcs Nagy	Hungary		35	26.58		

== Medals summary ==
=== Medalists ===
Medals for overall placement:

Discipline	Gold	Silver	Bronze
Men	(United States) Joshua Farris	(United States) Jason Brown	(United States) Shotaro Omori
Ladies	(Russia) Elena Radionova	(Russia) Yulia Lipnitskaya	(Russia) Anna Pogorilaya
Pairs	(United States) Haven Denney / Brandon Frazier	(Canada) Margaret Purdy / Michael Marinaro	(Russia) Lina Fedorova / Maxim Miroshkin
Ice dancing	(Russia) Alexandra Stepanova / Ivan Bukin	(France) Gabriella Papadakis / Guillaume Cizeron	(United States) Alexandra Aldridge / Daniel Eaton

Small medals for placement in the short segment:

Discipline	Gold	Silver	Bronze
Men	(United States) Joshua Farris	(United States) Shotaro Omori	(United States) Jason Brown
Ladies	(United States) Samantha Cesario	(Russia) Anna Pogorilaya	(United States) Courtney Hicks
Pairs	(China) Yu Xiaoyu / Jin Yang	(Canada) Margaret Purdy / Michael Marinaro	(United States) Haven Denney / Brandon Frazier
Ice dancing	(Russia) Alexandra Stepanova / Ivan Bukin	(France) Gabriella Papadakis / Guillaume Cizeron	(United States) Alexandra Aldridge / Daniel Eaton

Small medals for placement in the free segment:

Discipline	Gold	Silver	Bronze
Men	(United States) Jason Brown	(United States) Joshua Farris	(United States) Shotaro Omori
Ladies	(Russia) Elena Radionova	(Russia) Yulia Lipnitskaya	(Russia) Anna Pogorilaya
Pairs	(Russia) Lina Fedorova / Maxim Miroshkin	(United States) Haven Denney / Brandon Frazier	(Canada) Margaret Purdy / Michael Marinaro
Ice dancing	(Russia) Alexandra Stepanova / Ivan Bukin	(United States) Alexandra Aldridge / Daniel Eaton	(France) Gabriella Papadakis / Guillaume Cizeron

=== By country ===
Table of medals for overall placement:

Rank	Nation	Gold	Silver	Bronze	Total
1	Russia (RUS)	2	1	2	5
1	United States (USA)	2	1	2	5
3	Canada (CAN)	0	1	0	1
3	France (FRA)	0	1	0	1
Totals (4 entries)		4	4	4	12
