= Shotaro Omori =

American figure skater (born 1995)

Personal information
- Born: October 23, 1995 (age 30) Bellflower, California, U.S.
- Home town: La Mirada, California, U.S.
- Height: 5 ft 9 in (1.75 m)

Figure skating career
- Country: United States
- Coach: Yuka Sato, Jason Dungjen
- Skating club: Los Angeles FSC
- Began skating: 2003
Medal record
Figure skating: Men's singles
Representing United States
World Junior Championships
Bronze medal – third place	2013 Milan	Men's singles

Shotaro Omori (born October 23, 1995) is an American figure skater. He is the 2013 World Junior bronze medalist and 2013 U.S. national junior silver medalist. He is currently a coach at the Pasadena Ice Skating Center.

== Programs ==
Season	Short program	Free skating
2014–2015	Run Boy Run by Woodkid choreo. by Mark Pillay	Sheherazade by Nikolai Rimsky-Korsakov
2013–2014	The Last Airbender by James Newton Howard	Sheherazade by Nikolai Rimsky-Korsakov
2012–2013	Miss Tango by various artists	Rhapsody on a Theme of Paganini by Sergei Rachmaninoff
2011–2012	Libertango by Astor Piazzolla	Spanish Caravan by The Doors; The Barn by Miklós Rózsa

== Competitive highlights ==
CS: Challenger Series; JGP: Junior Grand Prix

International
Event	09–10	10–11	11–12	12–13	13–14	14–15	15–16	16–17	17–18
Junior Worlds				3rd	26th				
JGP Estonia			5th						
JGP Germany				4th		6th			
JGP Romania			4th						
JGP Slovakia					5th				
JGP Slovenia						4th			
JGP Turkey				4th					
Gardena Spring Trophy		3rd							
National
U.S. Champ.	9th N	9th J		2nd J		17th	12th	17th	
Pacific Coast	2nd N	3rd J	5th J	4th J	WD	3rd	2nd	2nd	5th
Southwest Pacific Reg.								1st	
J = Junior level; WD = Withdrew
