= Jasmine Tessari =

Italian ice dancer

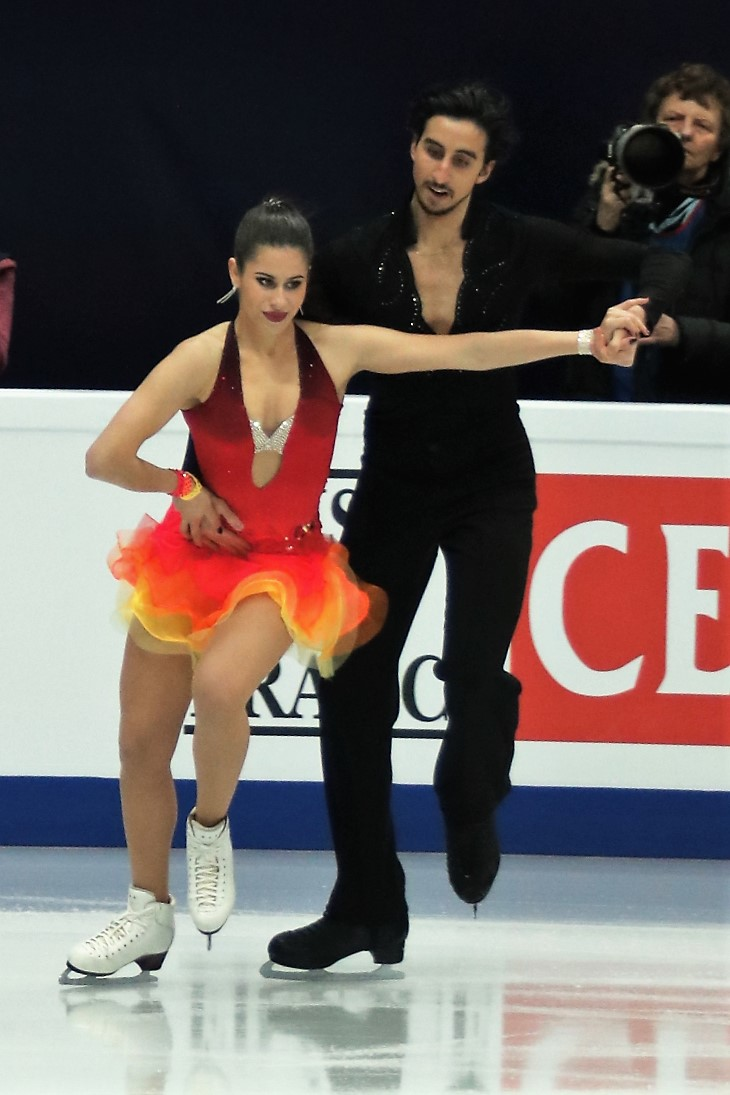
- Tessari/Fioretti at the 2018 European Championships

Personal information
- Born: 1 April 1996 (age 30) Basiglio, Italy
- Height: 1.65 m (5 ft 5 in)

Figure skating career
- Country: Switzerland
- Partner: Stephane Walker
- Coach: Barbara Fusar-Poli, Stefano Caruso
- Skating club: IceLab Forum Assago
- Began skating: 2001

Medal record
Representing Switzerland
Swiss Championships
Gold medal – first place	2022 Lucerne	Ice dance
Representing Italy
Italian Championships
Silver medal – second place	2019 Trento	Ice dance
Silver medal – second place	2020 Bergamo	Ice dance
Bronze medal – third place	2017 Egna	Ice dance
Bronze medal – third place	2018 Milan	Ice dance

Jasmine Tessari (born 1 April 1996) is an Italian ice dancer. With her former skating partner, Francesco Fioretti, she has won six international medals and is a four-time Italian national medalist. They have competed in the final segment at one ISU Championship.

As of July 2021, she is competing with Stéphane Walker for Switzerland. They are the 2022 Swiss national champions.

== Personal life ==
Tessari was born on 1 April 1996 in Basiglio, Italy. She is the daughter of Italian single skater and coach Cristina Mauri.

== Career ==
=== Early career ===
Tessari first stepped onto the ice as a one-year-old but was not interested in skating at that age; she returned to skating when she was five. As a single skater, she was coached by her mother, Cristina Mauri, at Mediolanum Forum di Assago.

At age 14, Tessari teamed up with her first ice dancing partner, Stefano Colafato. The two made their international junior debut in November 2010 at the Pavel Roman Memorial. Their ISU Junior Grand Prix debut came in September 2011. In January, they placed eighth at the 2012 Winter Youth Olympics in Innsbruck, Austria.

Tessari/Colafato were coached by Roberto Pelizzola and Nicoletta Lunghi at Forum S.S.D.R.L. Their last competition together was the Santa Claus Cup in December 2014. They decided to part ways due to problems in their partnership.

=== 2015–2016 season ===
Barbara Fusar-Poli asked Tessari to try out with Francesco Fioretti. After a few months of skating together, Tessari/Fioretti formalized their partnership. The two made their international debut in September 2015, at the Lombardia Trophy. They finished fourth at the Italian Championships.

=== 2016–2017 season ===
Tessari/Fioretti won bronze at the 2016 NRW Trophy. After becoming the Italian national bronze medalists, they were sent to the 2017 European Championships in Ostrava, Czech Republic; they finished 22nd in the short dance and did not advance further.

=== 2017–2018 season ===
In December 2017, Tessari/Fioretti won bronze at the Italian Championships. In January, they qualified to the free dance and finished 18th overall at the 2018 European Championships in Moscow, Russia. They concluded their season with silver medals at the Bavarian Open and Egna Spring Trophy.

=== 2018–2019 season ===
Tessari/Fioretti opened their season with silver at the 2018 NRW Trophy and then placed fourth at two ISU Challenger Series events, the 2018 CS Lombardia Trophy and 2018 CS Ondrej Nepela Trophy. They took bronze at the 2018 Ice Star in October. In November, the two debuted on the Grand Prix series, placing eighth at the 2018 Grand Prix of Helsinki. After winning the silver medal at the Italian Championships, Tessari/Fioretti placed fourteenth at the European Championships, and attended their first World Championships, where they placed twenty-fourth.

=== 2019–2020 season ===
Tessari/Fioretti placed twelfth at the 2019 CS Lombardia Trophy to begin the season, before making their second appearance on the Grand Prix at the 2019 Rostelecom Cup, where they placed tenth. After their second consecutive national silver medal, the two competed at the 2020 European Championships, placing sixteenth. This would prove to be their final competition together, as their partnership ended afterward.

=== 2021–2022 season & new partnership ===
In July, it was announced that Tessari had teamed up with Swiss skater Stéphane Walker, and that the two would be competing for Switzerland. Tessari/Walker won the Swiss national title in their inaugural season, and then debuted at the European Championships with a nineteenth-place finish.

== Programs ==
=== With Walker ===
Season	Rhythm dance	Free dance
2021–2022	Disco: Just an Illusion by Imagination; Blues: Woman in Love by Barbra Streisand; Disco: Can't Take My Eyes Off You performed by Gloria Gaynor choreo. by Corrado Giordani	Hable con ella by Alberto Iglesias; Le Di A Aa Caza Alcance by Estrella Morente; Poeta En El Mar by Vincente Amigo choreo. by Corrado Giordani

=== With Fioretti ===
Season	Rhythm dance	Free dance
2019–2020	Quickstep: Good Morning; Foxtrot: Singin' in the Rain (from Singin' in the Rain) by Arthur Freed & Nacio Herb Brown choreo. by Barbara Fusar-Poli, Corrado Giordani	Lullaby of the Leaves; Jazz Man; I'll Take Care of You performed by Beth Hart choreo. by Barbara Fusar-Poli, Corrado Giordani
2018–2019	Tango: Tango to Evora; Flamenco: Poeta en el Mar by Vicente Amigo choreo. by Barbara Fusar-Poli, Corrado Giordani	Hymne à l'amour performed by Patricia Kaas choreo. by Barbara Fusar-Poli, Corrado Giordani
	Short dance	
2017–2018	Salsa: La Vida Es Un Carnaval by Issac Delgado; Rhumba: Dos gardenias by Carmen Cuesta; Samba: Vive el Verano by Paulina Rubio choreo. by Corrado Giordani	Tosca by Giacomo Puccini; E lucevan le stelle; Com'è lunga l'attesa choreo. by Corrado Giordani
2016–2017	Blues: Twilight Time by The Platters; Swing: Mack the Knife performed by Robbie Williams choreo. by Corrado Giordani	Invierno Porteño by Astor Piazzolla performed by Trio Astoria; Yo Soy Maria performed by Maria Volonte choreo. by Corrado Giordani
2015–2016	Waltz: Lover; Foxtrot: Cheek to Cheek by Irving Berlin	Les Misérables by Claude-Michel Schönberg

=== With Colafato ===
Season	Short dance	Free dance
2014–2015	Samba: Swing da Cor by Daniela Arcori; Rhumba: Amor; Samba: Swing da Cor by Daniela Arcori choreo. by Corrado Giordani, Paola Mezzadri	The Godfather by Nino Rota; Tarantella; The Godfather choreo. by Corrado Giordani, Paola Mezzadri
2012–2013	Swing: Jessica and Roger Rabbit; Blues; Swing choreo. by Corrado Giordani, Paola Mezzadri	The Phantom of the Opera by Andrew Lloyd Webber choreo. by Corrado Giordani, Paola Mezzadri
2011–2012	Cha Cha: Corazón Espinado by Santana; Cha Cha: Por Ahí by Fernandez Adrian; Merengue: El Caraibico by Jose de Martin choreo. by Corrado Giordani	La cumparsita by Gerardo Matos Rodríguez choreo. by Corrado Giordani

== Competitive highlights ==
GP: Grand Prix; CS: Challenger Series; JGP: Junior Grand Prix

=== With Walker for Switzerland ===
International
Event	21–22
Worlds	23rd
Europeans	19th
CS Warsaw Cup	14th
Challenge Cup	4th
Cup of Nice	7th
NRW Trophy	3rd
National
Swiss Champ.	1st

=== With Fioretti for Italy ===
International
Event	15–16	16–17	17–18	18–19	19–20
Worlds				24th	
Europeans		22nd	18th	14th	16th
GP Finland				8th	
GP Rostelecom Cup					10th
CS Golden Spin					7th
CS Ice Challenge	7th				
CS Lombardia		5th	6th	4th	12th
CS Ondrej Nepela				4th	
Bavarian Open	7th	9th	2nd		
Cup of Nice		9th	10th		
Egna Dance Trophy			2nd	1st	
Halloween Cup					1st
Ice Star				3rd	
Lombardia Trophy	9th				
Mezzaluna Cup					3rd
NRW Trophy		3rd		2nd	
Open d'Andorra				1st	
Santa Claus Cup	7th		6th		
National
Italian Champ.	4th	3rd	3rd	2nd	2nd
WD = Withdrew

=== With Colafato for Italy ===
International: Junior
Event	10–11	11–12	12–13	13–14	14–15
Youth Olympics		8th			
JGP Croatia			15th		14th
JGP Italy		15th			
JGP Poland		16th			
JGP United States			11th		
Bavarian Open			16th		
Ice Challenge				12th	
Mont Blanc Trophy	15th				
Pavel Roman	16th				
Santa Claus Cup			13th	16th	10th
Volvo Open Cup					7th
National
Italian Champ.			6th J	3rd J	
J = Junior level
