= Barbara Fusar-Poli =

Italian ice dancing coach and former competitor

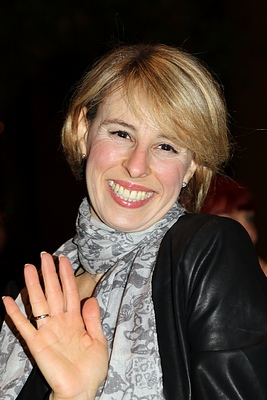
- Fusar-Poli in 2015

Personal information
- Born: 6 February 1972 (age 54)
- Height: 1.68 m (5 ft 6 in)

Figure skating career
- Country: Italy
- Partner: Maurizio Margaglio
- Skating club: Agora Skating Team, Milano
- Retired: 2002, 2006
Medal record
Figure skating: Ice dancing
Representing Italy
Olympic Games
Bronze medal – third place	2002 Salt Lake City	Ice dancing
World Championships
Gold medal – first place	2001 Vancouver	Ice dancing
Silver medal – second place	2000 Nice	Ice dancing
European Championships
Silver medal – second place	2002 Lausanne	Ice dancing
Gold medal – first place	2001 Bratislava	Ice dancing
Silver medal – second place	2000 Vienna	Ice dancing
Grand Prix Final
Gold medal – first place	2001-2002 Kitchener	Ice dancing
Silver medal – second place	1999-2000 Lyon	Ice dancing

Barbara Fusar-Poli (born 6 February 1972) is an Italian ice dancing coach and former competitor. With partner Maurizio Margaglio, she is the 2001 World champion, 2001 European champion, and 2002 Olympic bronze medalist. They won nine Italian titles and competed at three Olympics.

== Personal life ==
Fusar-Poli was born on 6 February 1972 in Sesto San Giovanni, Italy. She married her long-time boyfriend, Olympic short track competitor Diego Cattani, in June 2000. Their daughter, Giorgia, was born in 2004, and their son, Christian, four years later.

== Competitive Career ==
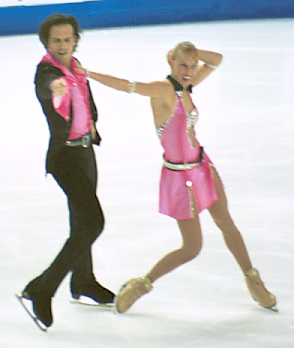
Fusar-Poli and partner Maurizio Margaglio compete at the 2001 Grand Prix Final

Early in her career, Fusar-Poli competed with Matteo Bonfa and then Alberto Reani. After Reani retired, she asked Maurizio Margaglio to skate with her. She and Margaglio began skating on the senior level in 1994-95, and enjoyed some success in the first years of their career, including winning several Grand Prix medals. In 1999-2000, they won their first medals at the European and World Championships, finishing in second place at both events. It was the first time Italy won a medal at Worlds. In their free dance that season, they used a mix of Celtic music, including selections from Lord of the Dance, the 1995 movie Bravehart, and a slow vocal section by Lorena McKennit. According to figure skating writer and historian Ellyn Kestnbaum, even though the program was theatrical, many of the steps they performed "was an attempt to translate Irish dance to the ice". Kestnbaum also described their free dance as "a narrative of conflict and resolution that showcased aggressive athleticism from both partners".

The following season was very successful for the duo, who won every event they entered and became the first Italians to win a World title in any discipline. They were not as successful in 2001-02, dropping to second at the Europeans and finishing third at the 2002 Winter Olympics. Their medal at the Olympics was not without some controversy, after Margaglio fell during the free dance portion. The result was protested by the Lithuanian team, who had finished fifth, but the protest was denied. Fusar-Poli/Margaglio did not compete at the 2002 World Championships and would not return to eligible skating until the 2005-06 season.

With the 2006 Winter Olympics being held in Turin, Fusar-Poli/Margaglio decided to return and compete in their home country. They did not skate in any international events prior to the Olympics, but did win the Italian National Championships. The Olympics were their first international event under the new scoring system adopted by the ISU, but, Fusar-Poli/Margaglio nonetheless held a narrow lead after the compulsory dance portion of the event, ahead of two-time world champions Tatiana Navka / Roman Kostomarov. This result was described in some news stories at the time as "shocking". In the original dance, Fusar-Poli/Margaglio were performing a rotational lift with only seconds left in their program when Margaglio lost his balance, dropped Fusar-Poli, and fell to the ice himself. Following this conclusion to the program, Fusar-Poli stood glaring at her partner for approximately thirty seconds before the couple took their bows and left the ice. They dropped to seventh overall, but moved up to sixth place after a clean free dance, and told the media that the incident at the end of the original dance had reflected their anger at the mistake rather than at each other. Several years later, Fusar-Poli said that there were Swarovski crystals on the ice from the costumes of earlier competitors, but that the fall was a result of their own mistake and not the ice conditions. The Olympics were Fusar-Poli/Margaglio's final competitive event together, but they continued to perform in shows.

== Post-competitive career ==
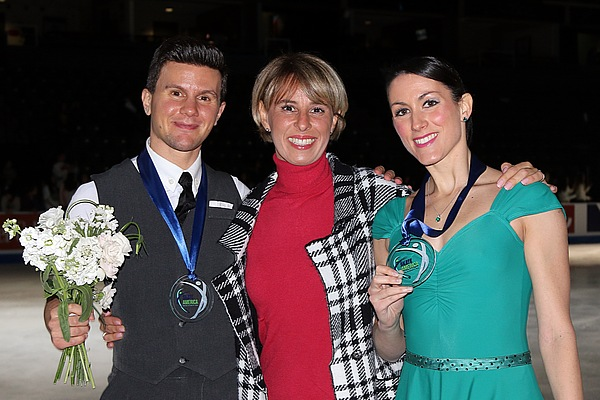
Fusar-Poli (center) with longtime students Marco Fabbri (left) and Charlène Guignard (right) at the 2018 Skate America

Following her retirement from competitive ice dance, Fusar-Poli began working as a coach in Milan at the Agorà Ice Rink.

Her current students include:

- (Italy) Charlène Guignard / Marco Fabbri
- (Hungary) Mariia Ignateva / Danijil Szemko
- (Netherlands) Hanna Jakucs / Alessio Galli
- (Germany) Charise Matthaei / Max Liebers

Her former students have included:

- (France) Adelina Galyavieva / Louis Thauron
- (Germany) Tanja Kolbe / Stefano Caruso
- (Italy) Misato Komatsubara / Andrea Fabbri
- (Japan) Misato Komatsubara / Tim Koleto
- (Italy) Natalia Mityushina / Matteo Zanni
- (Italy) Carolina Moscheni / Francesco Fioretti
- (Hungary) Carolina Moscheni / Ádám Lukács
- (Slovakia) Lucie Myslivečková / Lukáš Csölley
- (Slovakia) Mária Sofia Pucherová / Nikita Lysak
- (Italy) Jasmine Tessari / Francesco Fioretti
- (Switzerland) Jasmine Tessari / Stéphane Walker

She has also worked as a reporter for Italian TV and Eurosport coverage of skating events.

== Programs ==
With Margaglio

Season	Original dance	Free dance	Exhibition
2006–07			No More Tears (Enough Is Enough) by Barbra Streisand, Donna Summer
2005–06	Cha cha: Ríe y Llora by Celia Cruz; Rhumba: Mañana de Carnaval (from Black Orpheus) performed by Luis Miguel; Samba: Carnival	The Prince of Egypt by Hans Zimmer	Unchain My Heart by Joe Cocker
2002–05			Killing Me Softly with His Song by Roberta Flack; Adagio by Lara Fabian; 1492: Conquest of Paradise by Vangelis; I Will Survive by Hermes House Band; Night and Day by Frank Sinatra
2001–02	Flamenco; Paso doble: España cañí by Pascual Marquina Narro	I Will Survive by Gloria Gaynor arranged by Hermes House Band	Tango by Astor Piazzolla; This Business of Love (from The Mask) by Domino
2000–01	Quickstep: Puttin' On the Ritz; Foxtrot: Slow Fox; Quickstep: Puttin' On the Ritz by Irving Berlin	Romeo + Juliet by Nellee Hooper, Craig Armstrong, and Marius de Vries; Oh Verona; Mercutio's Death; Oh Verona	Tango by Astor Piazzolla; This Business of Love by Domino
1999–2000	Cha cha: El Chico; Rhumba: Eres Todo En Mi by Ana Gabriel; Samba: Mujer Latina by Thalía	Warriors (from Lord of the Dance) by Ronan Hardiman; The Dark Night of the Soul by Loreena McKennitt; Braveheart by James Horner	Hava Nagila
1998–99	Waltz: Swan Lake by Pyotr Tchaikovsky	Bram Stoker's Dracula by Wojciech Kilar; Interview with the Vampire by Elliot Goldenthal	Nessun dorma (from Turandot) by Giacomo Puccini; Since I Met You Baby
1997–98	Jive: Since I Met You Baby	Amarcord; 8½; Amarcord by Nino Rota	Unforgettable by Natalie Cole, Nat King Cole
1996–97	Tango: El Choclo by Ángel Villoldo	Italian folk music	
1995–96	Paso doble: España cañí by Pascual Marquina Narro	Casablanca by Max Steiner	
1994–95	Quickstep	Latin mix	

== Results ==
GP: Champions Series / Grand Prix

=== With Margaglio ===
International
Event	94–95	95–96	96–97	97–98	98–99	99–00	00–01	01–02	02–03	03–04	04–05	05–06
Olympics				6th				3rd				6th
Worlds		10th	9th	5th	5th	2nd	1st					
Europeans	10th	8th	7th	5th	4th	2nd	1st	2nd				
GP Final				5th	5th	2nd	1st	4th				
GP Cup of Russia						1st	1st	1st				
GP NHK Trophy			5th	3rd								
GP Skate America				2nd	3rd	1st	1st					
GP Skate Canada		7th	3rd									
GP Sparkassen Cup							1st	1st				
GP Trophée Lalique		6th			2nd	2nd						
Autumn Trophy			1st									
Lysiane Lauret		1st										
Schäfer Memorial	3rd											
National
Italian Champ.	1st	1st	1st	1st	1st	1st	1st	1st				1st

=== With Reani ===
Event	1992–93	1993–94
World Championships	22nd	17th
European Championships		17th
Italian Championships		1st
Nations Cup		6th
Piruetten		6th

=== With Bonfa ===
Event	1989–90	1990–91
World Junior Championships	15th	10th

== Bibliography ==
- Kestnbaum, Ellyn (2003). Culture on Ice: Figure Skating and Cultural Meaning. Middleton, Connecticut: Wesleyan Publishing Press. p. 248. ISBN 0-8195-6641-1.
