= Francesco Fioretti =

Italian ice dancer

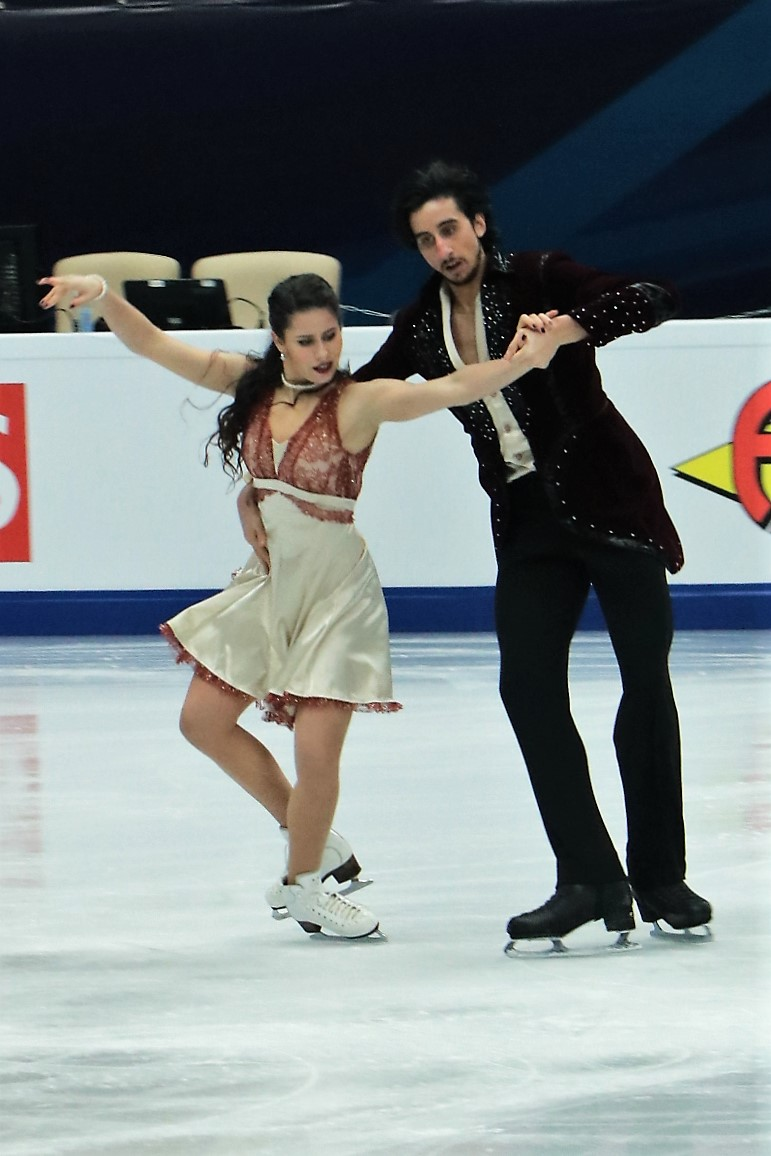
- Tessari/Fioretti at the 2018 European Championships

Personal information
- Born: 14 May 1993 (age 33) Massa di Somma, Italy
- Height: 1.86 m (6 ft 1 in)

Figure skating career
- Country: Italy
- Partner: Carolina Moscheni
- Coach: Barbara Fusar-Poli, Stefano Caruso
- Began skating: 2000

Medal record
Italian Championships
Silver medal – second place	2019 Trento	Ice dance
Silver medal – second place	2020 Bergamo	Ice dance
Silver medal – second place	2021 Egna	Ice dance
Silver medal – second place	2022 Turin	Ice dance
Bronze medal – third place	2017 Egna	Ice dance
Bronze medal – third place	2018 Milan	Ice dance

Francesco Fioretti (born 14 May 1993) is an Italian ice dancer, who currently competes with Carolina Moscheni. With his former skating partner Jasmine Tessari, he won six international medals and is a four-time Italian national medalist. They have competed in the final segment at one ISU Championship.

With Sofia Sforza, he placed as high as 10th at the World Junior Championships.

== Career ==
=== Early career ===
Francesco Fioretti began skating at age seven in Milan and chose ice dancing immediately. He relocated to Zanica in 2007. In September 2008, he competed with Martina Montonati at a Junior Grand Prix (JGP) event in Merano, Italy, placing 17th.

In December 2008, Fioretti formed a partnership with Sofia Sforza, whom he had met in Zanica. Making their international debut, they placed 11th in September 2009 at the Junior Grand Prix in Lake Placid, New York. Sforza/Fioretti reached the free dance at three World Junior Championships, placing 20th in 2011 (Gangneung, South Korea), 10th in 2012 (Minsk, Belarus), and 13th in 2013 (Milan, Italy). Their best JGP result, fourth, came in the 2013–14 season, in Mexico City. The two were coached by Valter Rizzo and Brunilde Bianchi mainly in Zanica. On 1 October 2013, it was reported that Sforza/Fioretti had parted ways.

Fioretti and American ice dancer Lauri Bonacorsi competed together at one event, the 2014 CS Nebelhorn Trophy, finishing tenth. The two were coached by Rizzo and Bianchi in Sesto San Giovanni. After six months together, Bonacorsi and Fioretti parted ways due to difficulties relating to her move to Italy.

=== 2015–2016 season ===
Barbara Fusar-Poli asked Jasmine Tessari to try out with Fioretti. After a few months of skating together, Tessari/Fioretti formalized their partnership. The two made their international debut in September 2015, at the Lombardia Trophy. They finished fourth at the Italian Championships.

=== 2016–2017 season ===
Tessari/Fioretti won bronze at the 2016 NRW Trophy. After becoming the Italian national bronze medalists, they were sent to the 2017 European Championships in Ostrava, Czech Republic; they finished 22nd in the short dance and did not advance further.

=== 2017–2018 season ===
In December 2017, Tessari/Fioretti won bronze at the Italian Championships. In January, they qualified to the free dance and finished 18th overall at the 2018 European Championships in Moscow, Russia. They concluded their season with silver medals at the Bavarian Open and Egna Spring Trophy.

=== 2018–2019 season ===
Tessari/Fioretti opened their season with silver at the 2018 NRW Trophy and then placed fourth at two ISU Challenger Series events, the 2018 CS Lombardia Trophy and 2018 CS Ondrej Nepela Trophy. They took bronze at the 2018 Ice Star in October. In November, the two debuted on the Grand Prix series, placing eighth at the 2018 Grand Prix of Helsinki. After winning the silver medal at the Italian Championships, Tessari/Fioretti placed fourteenth at the European Championships, and attended their first World Championships, where they placed twenty-fourth.

=== 2019–2020 season ===
Tessari/Fioretti placed twelfth at the 2019 CS Lombardia Trophy to begin the season, before making their second appearance on the Grand Prix at the 2019 Rostelecom Cup, where they placed tenth. After their second consecutive national silver medal, the two competed at the 2020 European Championships, placing sixteenth. This would prove to be their final competition together, as their partnership ended afterward.

=== 2020–2021 season ===
Following the end of his partnership with Tessari, Fioretti formed a new partnership with Carolina Moscheni. In their debut season, they won the Italian national silver medal, and then placed twenty-fifth at the 2021 World Championships.

=== 2021–2022 season ===
They were sixteenth at the 2021 CS Lombardia Trophy, their season debut. They were originally on the roster for the 2021 CS Nebelhorn Trophy, but were later replaced. After Italy was designated to host a special Gran Premio d'Italia on the 2021–22 Grand Prix, Moscheni/Fioretti were named as replacements for a withdrawn team to make their Grand Prix debut on home soil. They placed twelfth at the event. They were twenty-first at their inaugural European Championships appearance, missing the cut for the free dance. They finished the season twenty-sixth at the World Championships, missing the free dance there as well.

== Programs ==
=== With Moscheni ===
Season	Rhythm dance	Free dance
2020–2021	Quickstep: A Lovely Night; Waltz: Planetarium; Quickstep: Someone in the Crowd (from La La Land) by Justin Hurwitz, Benj Pasek, Justin Paul	Piano Concerto No. 2 by Sergei Rachmaninoff performed by David Garrett; The Fire Within by Jennifer Thomas

=== With Tessari ===
Season	Rhythm dance	Free dance
2019–2020	Quickstep: Good Morning; Foxtrot: Singin' in the Rain (from Singin' in the Rain) by Arthur Freed & Nacio Herb Brown choreo. by Barbara Fusar-Poli, Corrado Giordani	Lullaby of the Leaves; Jazz Man; I'll Take Care of You performed by Beth Hart choreo. by Barbara Fusar-Poli, Corrado Giordani
2018–2019	Tango: Tango to Evora; Flamenco: Poeta en el Mar by Vicente Amigo choreo. by Barbara Fusar-Poli, Corrado Giordani	Hymne à l'amour performed by Patricia Kaas choreo. by Barbara Fusar-Poli, Corrado Giordani
	Short dance	
2017–2018	Salsa: La Vida Es Un Carnaval by Issac Delgado; Rhumba: Dos gardenias by Carmen Cuesta; Samba: Vive el Verano by Paulina Rubio choreo. by Corrado Giordani	Tosca by Giacomo Puccini; E lucevan le stelle; Com'è lunga l'attesa choreo. by Corrado Giordani
2016–2017	Blues: Twilight Time by The Platters; Swing: Mack the Knife performed by Robbie Williams choreo. by Corrado Giordani	Invierno Porteño by Astor Piazzolla performed by Trio Astoria; Yo Soy Maria performed by Maria Volonte choreo. by Corrado Giordani
2015–2016	Waltz: Lover; Foxtrot: Cheek to Cheek by Irving Berlin	Les Misérables by Claude-Michel Schönberg

=== With Sforza ===
Season	Short dance	Free dance
2013–2014	That Man by Caro Emerald; You Are the One by Tracy Chapman	Notre-Dame de Paris by Riccardo Cocciante; Le Temps de Cathedrales; Danse Mon Esmeralda
2012–2013	Separation Blues by Maria Muldaur, Bonnie Raitt; Swing, Brother, Swing by Casey McGill	Schindler's List by John Williams; Eli Eli by Elizabet Fumero Muren; 160 BPM by Hans Zimmer
2011–2012	Sway; Swing Da Cor	Carmen by Georges Bizet
2010–2011	Once Upon a December (from Anastasia)	Street Tango by Olguin; Oblivion; Libertango by Astor Piazzolla

== Competitive highlights ==
GP: Grand Prix; CS: Challenger Series; JGP: Junior Grand Prix

=== With Moscheni ===
International
Event	20–21	21–22	22–23
Worlds	25th	26th	
Europeans		21st	
GP Italy		10th	
CS Cup of Austria		14th	
CS Golden Spin		WD	
CS Lombardia Trophy		16th	
CS Nebelhorn Trophy		WD	
Egna Trophy	3rd	2nd	
Mezzaluna Cup		3rd	2nd
National
Italian Champ.	2nd	2nd	
TBD = Assigned

=== With Tessari ===
International
Event	15–16	16–17	17–18	18–19	19–20
Worlds				24th	
Europeans		22nd	18th	14th	16th
GP Finland				8th	
GP Rostelecom Cup					10th
CS Golden Spin					7th
CS Ice Challenge	7th				
CS Lombardia		5th	6th	4th	12th
CS Ondrej Nepela				4th	
Bavarian Open	7th	9th	2nd		
Cup of Nice		9th	10th		
Egna Dance Trophy			2nd	1st	
Halloween Cup					1st
Ice Star				3rd	
Lombardia Trophy	9th				
Mezzaluna Cup					3rd
NRW Trophy		3rd		2nd	
Open d'Andorra				1st	
Santa Claus Cup	7th		6th		
National
Italian Champ.	4th	3rd	3rd	2nd	2nd
TBD = Assigned; WD = Withdrew

=== With Bonacorsi ===
International
Event	2014–15
CS Nebelhorn Trophy	10th

=== With Sforza ===
International: Junior
Event	09–10	10–11	11–12	12–13	13–14
Junior Worlds	31st	20th	10th	13th	
JGP Germany		8th			
JGP Italy			7th		
JGP Mexico					4th
JGP Romania		6th	5th		
JGP Turkey				6th	
Bavarian Open			3rd	1st	
Mont Blanc Trophy		4th			
NRW Trophy		9th	6th	3rd	
Pavel Roman			4th		
Santa Claus Cup				2nd	
National
Italian Champ.	2nd J		1st J	1st J	
J = Junior level

=== With Montonati ===
International
Event	2008–09
JGP Italy	17th
