= Philipp Tischendorf =

German figure skater

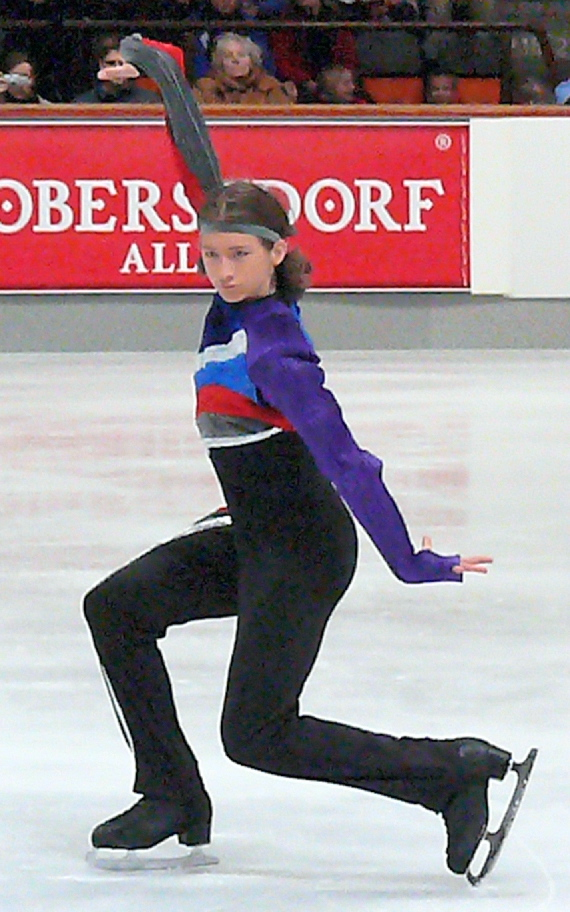
- Philipp Tischendorf at the 2007 German Championships

Personal information
- Born: 7 June 1988 (age 38) Berlin
- Height: 1.73 m (5 ft 8 in)

Figure skating career
- Country: Germany
- Skating club: SC Berlin
- Began skating: 1994
- Retired: 2011

Philipp Tischendorf (born 7 June 1988) is a German former competitive figure skater. He is the 2007 German national silver medalist and competed at two ISU Championships.

== Personal life ==
Philipp Tischendorf was born on 7 June 1988 in Berlin, Germany. In 1994, he began attending the Werner-Seelenbinder-School in Berlin, a special school for sportsmen. His mother was a gymnast, his father played volleyball in the second highest league in East Germany, his brother Robert played football for BFC Dynamo Berlin, and his sister Nadine and brother Max practiced figure skating.

== Career ==
Tischendorf was introduced to figure skating at age three and a half by his sister Nadine, who is 11 years his elder. Early in his career, he was coached by Jürgen Bertko. He debuted on the ISU Junior Grand Prix series in 2004.

In the 2006–07 season, Tischendorf won silver on the senior level at the German Championships and was selected to represent Germany at the 2007 European Championships in Warsaw. He qualified for the free skate by placing 16th in the short program. After placing 14th in the free, he finished 15th overall. At the 2007 World Junior Championships in Oberstdorf, he placed 20th in the short program, 11th in the free skate, and 13th overall. He was coached by Olympic silver medalist Romy Österreich in Berlin.

Tischendorf was injured in March 2007 while practicing a quadruple Lutz, forcing him to sit out the 2007–08. In February 2009, he relocated from Berlin to Oberstdorf to be coached by Michael Huth.

Tischendorf served in the Bundeswehr as a sportsperson.

== Programs ==
Season	Short program	Free skating
2009–2010	Tango by Gotan Project	Flamenco medley
2008–2009	Derrick	Tango
2007–2008	A gusta; Crazy Benny by Safri Duo	Kill Bill; Jer head
2006–2007	A gusta; Crazy Benny by Safri Duo	Flamenco
2005–2006	Saltimbanco-Barock (from Cirque du Soleil)	Flamenco
2004–2005	Saltimbanco-Barock (from Cirque du Soleil)	Zauberwald (musical)
2003–2004		Zauberwald (musical)
2002–2003		Robin Hood
2001–2002	Inti-Illimani	Robin Hood
2000–2001	Inti-Illimani	Konfu

== Competitive highlights ==
International
Event	2004–05	2005–06	2006–07	2008–09	2009–10
Europeans			15th		
Bavarian Open					1st
Challenge Cup				11th	
Crystal Skate					7th
Merano Cup					12th
NRW Trophy				7th	
Triglav Trophy					4th
International: Junior
Junior Worlds			13th		
JGP Canada		8th			
JGP China	12th				
JGP Czech Republic			8th		
JGP Germany	16th				
JGP Hungary			8th		
JGP Slovakia		3rd			
National
German Champ.		6th	2nd	3rd	4th
