= Stéphane Walker =

Swiss figure skater

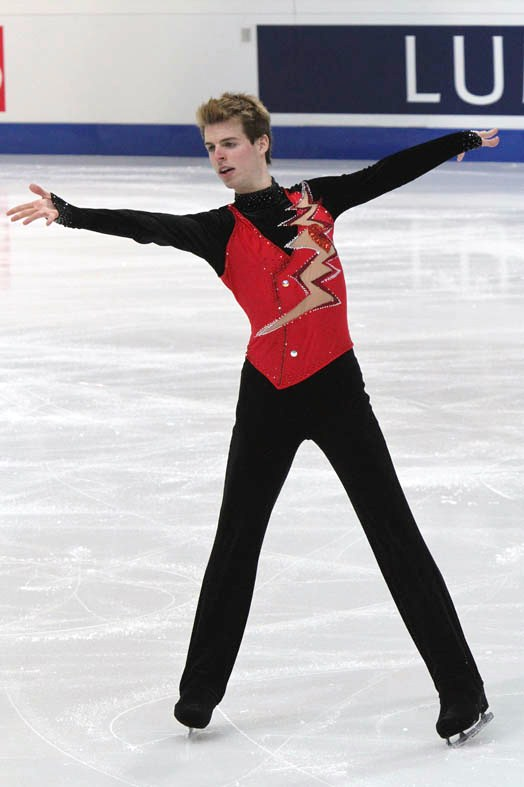

Personal information
- Born: 25 December 1990 (age 35) Sion, Switzerland
- Height: 1.82 m (5 ft 11 1/2 in)

Figure skating career
- Country: Switzerland
- Partner: Jasmine Tessari
- Skating club: CP Sion
- Began skating: 1994

Medal record
Swiss Championships
Gold medal – first place	2013 Geneva	Singles
Gold medal – first place	2014 La Chaux-de-Fonds	Singles
Gold medal – first place	2016 Lausanne	Singles
Gold medal – first place	2017 Lucerne	Singles
Gold medal – first place	2018 Neuchâtel	Singles
Gold medal – first place	2022 Lucerne	Ice dance
Silver medal – second place	2012 Basel	Singles
Silver medal – second place	2019 Wetzikon	Ice dance
Silver medal – second place	2020 Biel/Bienne	Ice dance
Bronze medal – third place	2011 Zug	Singles

Stéphane Walker (born 25 December 1990) is a Swiss figure skater. Competing in men's singles, he won ten international medals, including two on the ISU Challenger Series, and became a five-time Swiss national champion (2013–14, 2016–18). He appeared in the final segment at seven ISU Championships (six European Championships and the 2014 World Championships). Competing in Ice Dance with former partner Arianna Wroblewska, he is a two-time Swiss national silver medalist. As of July 2021, he is competing with Jasmine Tessari. They are the 2022 Swiss national champions.

== Career ==
=== Early years ===
Walker began learning to skate in 1994. His ISU Junior Grand Prix debut came in September 2007; he placed 20th at the Tallinn Cup in Estonia. In the 2007–08 season, he was coached by Heinz Wirz in Sion and Bern, Switzerland.

By the 2009–10 season, Walker was training under Myriam Loriol-Oberwiler in Neuchâtel. He was sent to the 2010 World Junior Championships in The Hague but was eliminated after placing 30th in the short program.

=== 2010–2011 through 2012–2013 ===
In January 2011, Walker appeared at his first senior ISU Championship, the 2011 European Championships in Bern, and qualified for the final segment. He placed 10th in the preliminary round, 24th in the short program, 24th in the free skate, and 24th overall.

At the 2013 European Championships in Zagreb, Croatia, he ranked 24th in the short, 17th in the free, and 20th overall.

=== 2013–2014 season ===
In September 2013, Walker competed at the Nebelhorn Trophy, the last qualifying opportunity for the 2014 Winter Olympics, but his placement, 15th, was insufficient to earn a spot in Sochi, Russia.

Walker reached the free skate at two ISU Championships – he finished 17th at the 2014 European Championships in January in Budapest, Hungary, and 23rd at the 2014 World Championships in March in Saitama, Japan.

=== 2014–2015 season ===
Walker had surgery on his right foot in June 2014 and spent ten weeks in a cast. He resumed training in mid-November 2014. He competed at the 2015 European Championships in Stockholm and 2015 World Championships in Shanghai but was eliminated after the short program at both events.

=== 2015–2016 and 2016–2017 seasons ===
By December 2015, Walker was training under Franca Bianconi and Rosanna Murante in Sesto San Giovanni, Italy. At the 2016 European Championships in Bratislava, he placed 22nd in the short, 18th in the free, and 19th overall. He also qualified to the free skate at the 2017 European Championships in Ostrava, placing 19th in the short, 15th in the free, and 17th overall.

=== 2017–2018 season ===
Walker finished 9th at the 2017 CS Nebelhorn Trophy. Due to his result, Switzerland was the second alternate country for the men's event at the 2018 Winter Olympics. He placed 18th (16th in the short, 20th in the free) at the 2018 European Championships in Moscow. He did not advance to the free skate at the 2018 World Championships in Milan.

=== 2018–2019 season ===
In October 2018, Walker teamed up with Arianna Wróblewska to compete in ice dancing. Two months later they placed second at the Swiss National Championships.

== Programs ==
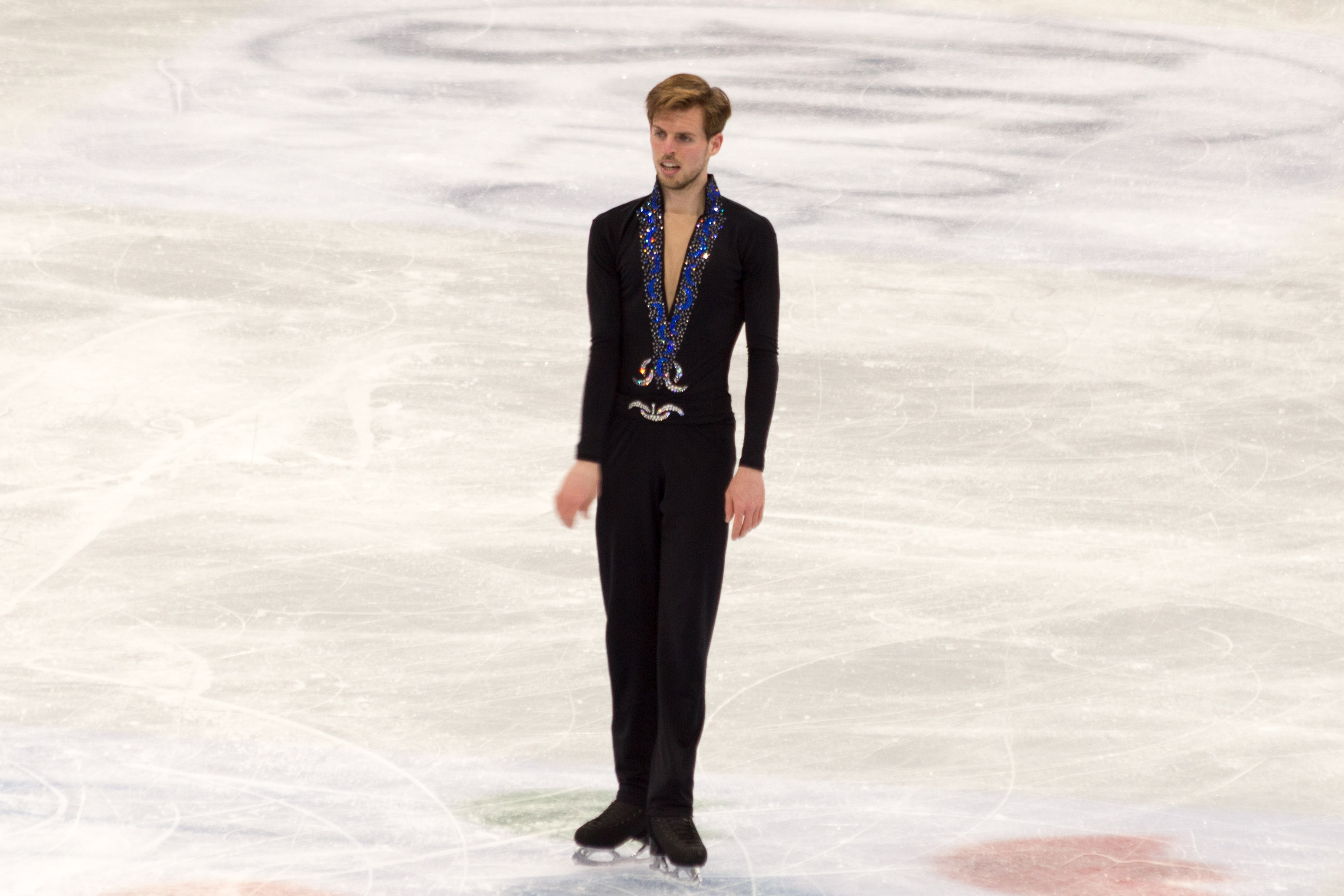
Walker at the 2017 World Championships

=== Ice dancing ===
Season	Rhythm dance	Free dance
2019-2020		Next To Me; Believer by Imagine Dragons
2018–2019		Squeeze Me by Keir; Mutant Brain by Sam Spiegel & Ape Drums Feat. Assassin

=== Single skating ===
Season	Short program	Free skating
2017–2018	Io ci sarò by David Foster, Walter Afanasieff performed by Andrea Bocelli, Lang Lang	Truman Sleeps by Philip Glass; Wayward Sisters by Abel Korzeniowski
2016–2017	Purple Rain by Prince	Mi Mancherai by Josh Groban
2015–2016	Wicked Game by James Vincent McMorrow	Piano Concerto No. 21, Andante by Wolfgang Amadeus Mozart
2014–2015	Scene Finale (from Swan Lake) by Pyotr Ilyich Tchaikovsky	Piano Concerto No. 21, Andante by Wolfgang Amadeus Mozart
2013–2014	Strobe's Nanafushi by Kodo	Shades of Marble by Trentemøller; Only God Forgives by Cliff Martinez; Roadgame by Kavinsky
2012–2013	Melodia del Rio; La Lluvia by Ruben Gonzalez	Atonement by Dario Marianelli; Primavera by Ludovico Einaudi
2009–2011	Angel and Devil by Maxime Rodriguez	Kill the Target by Tomoyasu Hotei; Beethoven's Last Night by Trans-Siberian Orchestra
2007–2008	Mr. & Mrs. Smith by John Powell	Azzurro by Louis Crelier

== Results ==
CS: Challenger Series; JGP: Junior Grand Prix

=== Ice dance with Tessari ===
International
Event	21–22
Worlds	23rd
Europeans	19th
CS Warsaw Cup	14th
Challenge Cup	4th
Cup of Nice	7th
NRW Trophy	3rd
National
Swiss Champ.	1st

=== Ice dance with Wróblewska ===
International
Event	18–19	19–20	20–21
CS Ice Star		8th	
CS Nebelhorn Trophy			5th
Bavarian Open	10th		
Bosphorus Istanbul Cup		10th	
Egna Trophy		7th	
Mentor Toruń Cup		11th	
Open d'Andorra		7th	
Open Ice Mall Cup	9th		
National
Swiss Championships	2nd	2nd	
Ticino Cup		2nd	

=== Single skating ===
International
Event	06–07	07–08	08–09	09–10	10–11	11–12	12–13	13–14	14–15	15–16	16–17	17–18
Worlds								23rd	30th		28th	27th
Europeans					24th		20th	17th	26th	19th	17th	18th
CS Ice Challenge										8th		
CS Lombardia											4th	9th
CS Nebelhorn												9th
CS Nepela											7th	
CS Warsaw Cup										9th	3rd	2nd
Bavarian Open							10th					
Challenge Cup		9th				11th	9th	5th				
Crystal Skate						5th	4th					
Cup of Nice				8th	14th			12th				
Cup of Tyrol											4th	6th
Dragon Trophy								4th				
Gardena							3rd			3rd		
Golden Bear											3rd	
Hamar Trophy									1st			
Ice Challenge						9th	8th					
Merano Cup											1st	
Nebelhorn Trophy								15th				
Nepela Trophy							8th					
NRW Trophy					11th							
Slovenia Open								5th				3rd
Sportland Trophy										3rd		
Triglav Trophy				7th		5th						
Warsaw Cup								1st				
Universiade					15th			14th	13th			
International: Junior
Junior Worlds				30th								
JGP Czech Rep.			7th									
JGP Estonia		20th										
JGP USA				12th								
Challenge Cup			4th									
Gardena		4th										
National
Swiss Champ.	5th	4th	5th	5th	3rd	2nd	1st	1st		1st	1st	1st
