= Bavarian Open =

International figure skating competition

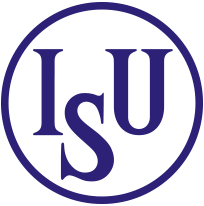
- Location: Germany

The Bavarian Open is an international figure skating competition held in February at the Eissportzentrum Oberstdorf in Oberstdorf, Germany. It is organized by the Skating Union of Bavaria. Since 2011, it has been sanctioned by the Deutsche Eislauf Union and the International Skating Union. Medals may be awarded in men's singles, women's singles, pair skating, and ice dance at the senior and junior levels.

== Senior results ==
=== Men's singles ===
Year	Gold	Silver	Bronze	Ref.
2008	(Italy) Fabio Mascarello	(Germany) Ferenc Kassai	No other competitors	
2009	(Ukraine) Anton Kovalevski	(Germany) Philipp Tischendorf	(United Kingdom) Matthew Parr	
2010	(Germany) Philipp Tischendorf	(Germany) Michael Biondi	(Switzerland) Mikael Redin	
2011	(Czech Republic) Michal Březina	(Germany) Denis Wieczorek	(Germany) Christopher Berneck	
2012	(Germany) Franz Streubel	(Germany) Martin Rappe	(Philippines) Christopher Caluza	
2013	(Japan) Nobunari Oda	(Japan) Kento Nakamura	(Germany) Paul Fentz	
2014	(Italy) Ivan Righini	(Germany) Franz Streubel	(Czech Republic) Petr Coufal	
2015	(Russia) Andrei Lazukin	(Germany) Franz Streubel	(Finland) Valtter Virtanen	
2016	(Italy) Ivan Righini	(Germany) Franz Streubel	(Japan) Ryuju Hino	
2017	(United States) Vincent Zhou	(Japan) Hiroaki Sato	(Japan) Shu Nakamura	
2018	(Italy) Maurizio Zandron	(Switzerland) Lukas Britschgi	(Czech Republic) Petr Kotlařík	
2019	(Japan) Koshiro Shimada	(Canada) Conrad Orzel	(United Kingdom) Peter James Hallam	
2020	(Japan) Shun Sato	(Sweden) Nikolaj Majorov	(Japan) Yuto Kishina	
2021	Event cancelled due to the COVID-19 pandemic			
2022	(Poland) Vladimir Samoilov	(Austria) Luc Maierhofer	(Germany) Kai Jagoda	
2023	(Finland) Valtter Virtanen	(Germany) Kai Jagoda	(Ukraine) Kyrylo Marsak	
2024	(Latvia) Deniss Vasiļjevs	(Czech Republic) Georgiy Reshtenko	(Israel) Lev Vinokur	
2025	(Italy) Gabriele Frangipani	(Mexico) Donovan Carrillo	(Italy) Raffaele Francesco Zich	
2026	(Czech Republic) Georgii Reshtenko	(Switzerland) Ean Weiler	(Poland) Kornel Witkowski	

=== Women's singles ===
Year	Gold	Silver	Bronze	Ref.
2008	(Germany) Sarah Hecken	(Germany) Kristin Wieczorek	(Italy) Roberta Rodeghiero	
2009	(Italy) Alice Garlisi	(Italy) Roberta Rodeghiero	(Italy) Alice Velati	
2010	(Germany) Katharina Häcker	(Italy) Roberta Rodeghiero	(Austria) Andrea Kreuzer	
2011	(Germany) Katharina Häcker	(Austria) Belinda Schönberger	(Austria) Miriam Ziegler	
2012	(Germany) Nathalie Weinzierl	(Italy) Roberta Rodeghiero	(Sweden) Isabelle Olsson	
2013	(Germany) Nathalie Weinzierl	(Germany) Sarah Hecken	(Slovakia) Nicole Rajičová	
2014	(Sweden) Joshi Helgesson	(Switzerland) Anna Ovcharova	(France) Anais Ventard	
2015	(Japan) Mariko Kihara	(Germany) Lutricia Bock	(Netherlands) Niki Wories	
2016	(Japan) Yuka Nagai	(Germany) Lutricia Bock	(Germany) Lea Johanna Dastich	
2017	(United States) Angela Wang	(Germany) Nathalie Weinzierl	(Germany) Lea Johanna Dastich	
2018	(Japan) Rin Nitaya	(Japan) Yura Matsuda	(Germany) Nathalie Weinzierl	
2019	(Japan) Satoko Miyahara	(Japan) Yuna Aoki	(Canada) Aurora Cotop	
2020	(Japan) Satoko Miyahara	(Japan) Marin Honda	(Netherlands) Niki Wories	
2021	Event cancelled due to the COVID-19 pandemic			
2022	(Germany) Kristina Isaev	(Germany) Nicole Schott	(Finland) Linnea Ceder	
2023	(Italy) Marina Piredda	(Germany) Kristina Isaev	(Cyprus) Marilena Kitromilis	
2024	(Switzerland) Livia Kaiser	(Israel) Elizabet Gervits	(Austria) Olga Mikutina	
2025	(France) Léa Serna	(Finland) Nella Pelkonen	(Austria) Stefanie Pesendorfer	
2026	(United States) Alina Bonillo	(Czech Republic) Eliska Brezinova	(Germany) Sarah Marie Pesch	

=== Pairs ===
Year	Gold	Silver	Bronze	Ref.
2010	(Czech Republic); Klára Kadlecová; Petr Bidař	(Germany); Nicole Gurny; Martin Liebers	No other competitors	
2011	(Germany); Maylin Hausch; Daniel Wende	(Germany); Katharina Gierok; Florian Just	(Germany); Mari Vartmann; Aaron Van Cleave	
2012	(Germany); Maylin Hausch; Daniel Wende	(Russia); Katarina Gerboldt; Alexander Enbert	(Italy); Nicole Della Monica; Matteo Guarise	
2013	(Russia); Ksenia Stolbova; Fedor Klimov	(Russia); Julia Antipova; Nodari Maisuradze	(Germany); Mari Vartmann; Aaron Van Cleave	
2014	(Russia); Julia Antipova; Nodari Maisuradze	(Russia); Katarina Gerboldt; Alexander Enbert	(Italy); Giulia Foresti; Luca Demattè	
2015	(United Kingdom); Amani Fancy; Christopher Boyadji	(Italy); Alessandra Cernuschi; Filippo Ambrosini	(Bulgaria); Elizaveta Makarova; Leri Kenchadze	
2016	(Germany); Aliona Savchenko; Bruno Massot	(Germany); Minerva-Fabienne Hase; Nolan Seegert	(France); Lola Esbrat; Andrei Novoselov	
2017	(Switzerland); Ioulia Chtchetinina; Noah Scherer	(Switzerland); Alexandra Herbríková; Nicolas Roulet	(Hungary); Daria Beklemisheva; Mark Magyar	
2019	(Spain); Laura Barquero; Aritz Maestu	(Germany); Annika Hocke; Ruben Blommaert	(United Kingdom); Zoe Jones; Christopher Boyadji	
2020	(Russia); Anastasia Mishina; Aleksandr Galliamov	(Germany); Annika Hocke; Robert Kunkel	(Russia); Karina Akopova; Maksim Shagalov	
2021	Event cancelled due to the COVID-19 pandemic			
2022	(Italy); Irma Caldara; Riccardo Maglio	(Italy); Anna Valesi; Manuel Piazza	(Netherlands); Nika Osipova; Dmitry Epstein	
2023	(Hungary); Mária Pavlova; Alexei Sviatchenko	(Netherlands); Daria Danilova; Michel Tsiba	(Czech Republic); Federica Simioli; Alessandro Zarbo	
2024	(Netherlands); Daria Danilova; Michel Tsiba	(Poland); Ioulia Chtchetinina; Michał Woźniak	(Czech Republic); Barbora Kucianová; Martin Bidař	
2025	(France); Aurelie Faula; Theo Belle	(Sweden); Greta Crafoord; John Crafoord	(Austria); Sophia Schaller; Livio Mayr	
2026	(France); Megan Wessenberg; Denys Strekalin	(Austria); Sophia Schaller; Livio Mayr	No other competitors	

=== Ice dance ===
Year	Gold	Silver	Bronze	Ref.
2011	(Germany); Nelli Zhiganshina; Alexander Gazsi	(Russia); Jana Khokhlova; Fedor Andreev	(Spain); Sara Hurtado; Adria Diaz	
2012	(Italy); Charlène Guignard; Marco Fabbri	(Russia); Ekaterina Pushkash; Jonathan Guerreiro	(Czech Republic); Lucie Myslivečková; Neil Brown	
2013	(United Kingdom); Penny Coomes; Nicholas Buckland	(Lithuania); Isabella Tobias; Deividas Stagniūnas	(Italy); Lorenza Alessandrini; Simone Vaturi	
2014	(Poland); Justyna Plutowska; Peter Gerber	(Germany); Shari Koch; Christian Nüchtern	(Finland); Henna Lindholm; Ossi Kanervo	
2015	(Italy); Misato Komatsubara; Andrea Fabbri	(Israel); Allison Reed; Vasili Rogov	(Czech Republic); Cortney Mansour; Michal Češka	
2016	(United Kingdom); Penny Coomes; Nicholas Buckland	(Armenia); Tina Garabedian; Simon Proulx-Sénécal	(United Kingdom); Carter Marie Jones; Richard Sharpe	
2017	(Italy); Anna Cappellini; Luca Lanotte	(Spain); Olivia Smart; Adrià Díaz	(Germany); Kavita Lorenz; Panagiotis Polizoakis	
2018	(United Kingdom); Lilah Fear; Lewis Gibson	(Italy); Jasmine Tessari; Francesco Fioretti	(Germany); Shari Koch; Christian Nüchtern	
2019	(Russia); Anastasia Shpilevaya; Grigory Smirnov	(Germany); Jennifer Urban; Benjamin Steffan	(Finland); Juulia Turkkila; Matthias Versluis	
2020	(Lithuania); Allison Reed; Saulius Ambrulevičius	(France); Marie-Jade Lauriault; Romain Le Gac	(Canada); Haley Sales; Nikolas Wamsteeker	
2021	Event cancelled due to the COVID-19 pandemic			
2022	(Germany); Jennifer Janse van Rensburg; Benjamin Steffan	(France); Marie Dupayage; Thomas Nabais	(France); Lou Terreaux; Noé Perron	
2023	(Germany); Jennifer Janse van Rensburg; Benjamin Steffan	(Finland); Yuka Orihara; Juho Pirinen	(France); Natacha Lagouge; Arnaud Caffa	
2024	(Germany); Jennifer Janse van Rensburg; Benjamin Steffan	(France); Natacha Lagouge; Arnaud Caffa	(France); Lou Terreaux; Noé Perron	
2025	(Germany); Jennifer Janse van Rensburg; Benjamin Steffan	(Sweden); Milla Ruud Reitan; Nikolaj Majorov	(Germany); Charise Matthaei; Max Liebers	
2026	(Sweden); Milla Ruud Reitan; Nikolaj Majorov	(United States); Elliana Peal; Ethan Peal	(Italy); Giulia Isabella Paolino; Andrea Tuba	

== Junior results ==
=== Men's singles ===
Year	Gold	Silver	Bronze	Ref.
2008	(Czech Republic) Petr Bidař	(Italy) Ruben Errampalli	(Italy) Saverio Giacomelli	
2009	(Italy) Saverio Giacomelli	(Italy) Luca Dematte	(Italy) Filippo Ambrosini	
2010	(Switzerland) Stéphane Walker	(Switzerland) Laurent Alvarez	(Germany) Alexander Lohmayer	
2011	(Germany) Martin Rappe	(Bulgaria) Pavel Savinov	(Germany) Manuel Leitner	
2012	(France) Noël-Antoine Pierre	(France) Charles Tetar	(Germany) Vincent Hey	
2013	(Ukraine) Ivan Pavlov	(Germany) Anton Kempf	(Germany) Panagiotis Polizoakis	
2014	(Latvia) Deniss Vasiljevs	(Israel) Daniel Samohin	(Russia) Egor Murashov	
2015	(Russia) Egor Murashov	(Germany) Anton Kempf	(France) Daniel Albert Naurits	
2016	(Germany) Dave Kötting	(United Kingdom) Josh Brown	(Russia) Egor Murashov	
2017	(Canada) Nicolas Nadeau	(Canada) Conrad Orzel	(Canada) Joseph Phan	
2018	(Japan) Kazuki Kushida	(Japan) Shun Sato	(France) Adam Siao Him Fa	
2019	(Switzerland) Nurullah Sahaka	(United States) Joonsoo Kim	(Germany) Jonathan Hess	
2020	(Canada) Stephen Gogolev	(Canada) Joseph Phan	(Japan) Lucas Tsuyoshi Honda	
2021	Event cancelled due to the COVID-19 pandemic			
2022	(Japan) Tatsuya Tsuboi	(Italy) Matteo Nalbone	(France) François Pitot	
2023	(Germany) Luca Fünfer	(Switzerland) Aurélian Chervet	(Germany) Robert Wildt	
2024	(United States) Taira Shinohara	(Israel) Tamir Kuperman	(Israel) Nikita Sheiko	
2025	(Israel) Tamir Kuperman	(Germany) Genrikh Gartung	(Israel) Nikita Sheiko	
2026	(Canada) Grayson Long	(Thailand) Hiro Kaewtathip	(Austria) Maksym Petrychenko	

=== Women's singles ===
Year	Group	Gold	Silver	Bronze	Ref.
2008	—N/a	(Germany) Sandy Hoffmann	(Germany) Briana Munoz	(Italy) Alice Garlisi	
2009	—N/a	(Germany) Jennifer Urban	(Switzerland) Romy Bühler	(Switzerland) Virginie Clerc	
2010	Group I	(Italy) Carlotta Ortenzi	(Switzerland) Virginie Clerc	(Germany) Jeanny-Ann Kaiser	
2010	Group II	(Switzerland) Tina Stürzinger	(Slovakia) Monika Simančíková	(Germany) Isabelle Glaser	
2011	—N/a	(Switzerland) Romy Bühler	(Australia) Brooklee Han	(Germany) Anne Zetzsche	
2012	Group I	(France) Laurine Lecavelier	(Germany) Jennifer Parker	(Denmark) Anita Madsen	
2012	Group II	(Germany) Maria-Katharina Herceg	(Switzerland) Yasmine Kimiko Yamada	(Switzerland) Tanja Odermatt	
2013	Group I	(Germany) Maria-Katharina Herceg	(Philippines) Allison Perticheto	(Switzerland) Yasmine Kimiko Yamada	
2013	Group II	(France) Bahia Taleb	(France) Anaïs Ventard	(Germany) Jennifer Parker	
2014	Group I	(Finland) Jenni Saarinen	(Finland) Liubov Efimenko	(South Africa) Michaela du Toit	
2014	Group II	(Germany) Maria-Katharina Herceg	(Latvia) Angelina Kučvaļska	(Switzerland) Matilde Gianocca	
2015	Group I	(United Kingdom) Danielle Harrison	(Germany) Kristina Isaev	(France) Marina Popov	
2015	Group II	(Germany) Maria-Katharina Herceg	(Germany) Jennifer Schmidt	(Switzerland) Matilde Gianocca	
2016	Group I	(Russia) Alisa Lozko	(Japan) Yuna Aoki	(Ukraine) Anastasia Hozhva	
2016	Group II	(United States) Tyler Pierce	(United Kingdom) Danielle Harrison	(Germany) Alissa Scheidt	
2017	Group I	(Japan) Saya Suzuki	(Japan) Riko Takino	(Germany) Ann-Christin Marold	
2017	Group II	(Canada) Sarah Tamura	(Germany) Paula Mikolajczyk	(Germany) Alissa Scheidt	
2018	—N/a	(Japan) Tomoe Kawabata	(Japan) Rinka Watanabe	(United States) Pooja Kalyan	
2019	Group I	(South Korea) You Young	(Japan) Wakana Naganawa	(Italy) Lucrezia Beccari	
2019	Group II	(Japan) Yuna Shiraiwa	(United States) Emilia Murdock	(Germany) Romy Schallert	
2020	Group I	(Canada) Kaiya Ruiter	(United States) Elsa Cheng	(Italy) Ginevra Lavinia Negrello	
2020	Group II	(Canada) Madeline Schizas	(Israel) Viktoria Iushchenkova	(United States) Ellen Slavicek	
2021	Event cancelled due to the COVID-19 pandemic				
2022	Group I	(Finland) Iida Karhunen	(Italy) Anna Pezzetta	(France) Lola Ghozali	
2022	Group II	(Japan) Hana Yoshida	(Japan) Rinka Watanabe	(France) Lorine Schild	
2023	Group I	(Switzerland) Anthea Gradinaru	(Cyprus) Stefania Yakovleva	(Israel) Gabriela Grinberg	
2023	Group II	(Finland) Pihla Bergman	(Netherlands) Jolanda Vos	(Germany) Anna Grekul	
2024	Group I	(Switzerland) Leandra Tzimpoukakis	(Netherlands) Angel Delevaque	(Germany) Olesya Ray	
2024	Group II	(Poland) Noelle Streuli	(Germany) Julia Grabowski	(Finland) Heidi Moisio	
2025	—N/a	(Israel) Sophia Shifrin	(Switzerland) Leandra Tzimpoukakis	(Switzerland) Anastasia Brandenburg	
2026	—N/a	(Switzerland) Valeriya Ezhova	(Switzerland) Leandra Tzimpoukakis	(France) Stefania Gladki	

=== Pairs ===
Year	Gold	Silver	Bronze	Ref.
2009	(Germany); Juliana Gurdzhi; Alexander Völler	(Italy); Carolina Gillespie; Daniel Aggiano	(Germany); Vanessa Schöche; Andreas Müller	
2010	(Germany); Juliana Gurdzhi; Alexander Völler	No other competitors		
2011	(Netherlands); Rachel Epstein; Dmitry Epstein	(Switzerland); Anais Morand; Timothy Leemann	No other competitors	
2012	(France); Camille Mendoza; Christopher Boyadji	(Germany); Linda Wenzig; Matti Landgraf	(Italy); Bianca Manacorda; Niccolò Macii	
2013	(Germany); Annabelle Prölß; Ruben Blommaert	(Russia); Arina Cherniavskaia; Antonio Souza-Kordeyru	(Germany); Vanessa Bauer; Nolan Seegert	
2014	(Italy); Bianca Manacorda; Niccolo Macii	(Japan); Ami Koga; Francis Boudreau-Audet	(United Kingdom); Molly Lanaghan; Jake Astill	
2015	(Russia); Anastasia Mishina; Vladislav Mirzoev	(Italy); Irma Caldara; Edoardo Caputo	(Germany); Minori Yuge; Jannis Bronisefski	
2016	(Russia); Anastasia Mishina; Vladislav Mirzoev	(Ukraine); Renata Ohanesian; Mark Bardei	(Italy); Bianca Manacorda; Niccolò Macii	
2017	(Canada); Evelyn Walsh; Trennt Michaud	(Canada); Lori-Ann Matte; Thierry Ferland	(United States); Alexandria Yao; Austin Hale	
2018	(United States); Laiken Lockley; Keenan Prochnow	(Italy); Sara Carli; Marco Pauletti	(Sweden); Greta Crafoord; John Crafoord	
2019	(United States); Chelsea Liu; Ian Meyh	(Russia); Elvira Kildeeva; Vladimir Sled	(Russia); Karina Safina; Mikhail Domnin	
2020	(Canada); Kelly Ann Laurin; Loucas Éthier	(Canada); Gabrielle Levesque; Pier-Alexandre Hudon	(Italy); Alyssa Montan; Manuel Piazza	
2021	Event cancelled due to the COVID-19 pandemic			
2022	(Canada); Brooke McIntosh; Benjamin Mimar	(Canada); Summer Homick; Marty Haubrich	(Czech Republic); Barbora Kucianová; Lukáš Vochozka	
2023	(United States); Naomi Williams; Lachlan Lewer	(Czech Republic); Barbora Kucianová; Lukáš Vochozka	(United States); Lilianna Murray; Jordan Gillette	
2024	(Czech Republic); Debora Anna Cohen; Lukas Vochozka	(France); Louise Ehrhard; Matthis Pellegris	(France); Romane Telemaque; Lucas Coulon	
2025	(Canada); Ava Kemp; Yohnatan Elizarov	(Switzerland); Oxana Vouillamoz; Tom Bouvart	(Canada); Martina Ariano Kent; Charly Laliberté Laurent	
2026	(Canada); Jazmine Desrochers; Kieran Thrasher	(United States); Olivia Flores; Luke Wang	(Ukraine); Hannah Herrera; Ivan Khobta	

=== Ice dance ===
Year	Gold	Silver	Bronze	Ref.
2008	(Italy); Lorenza Alessandrini; Simone Vaturi	(Czech Republic); Lucie Myslivečková; Matěj Novák	(Czech Republic); Karolina Procházková; Michal Češka	
2009	(Germany); Juliane Haslinger; Tom Finke	(Austria); Sonja Pauli; Tobias Eisenbauer	(Germany); Dominique Dieck; Michael Zenkner	
2010	(Spain); Sara Hurtado; Adria Diaz	(Austria); Sonja Pauli; Tobias Eisenbauer	(Czech Republic); Karolina Procházková; Michal Češka	
2011	(Russia); Valeria Loseva; Denis Lunin	(Russia); Tatiana Baturintseva; Sergey Mozgov	(Czech Republic); Karolina Procházková; Michal Češka	
2012	(Czech Republic); Karolina Procházková; Michal Češka	(France); Elektra Hetman; Benjamin Allain	(Italy); Sofia Sforza; Francesco Fioretti	
2013	(Italy); Sofia Sforza; Francesco Fioretti	(Russia); Daria Morozova; Mikhail Zhirnov	(Italy); Alessia Busi; Andrea Fabbri	
2014	(Russia); Daria Morozova; Mikhail Zhirnov	(Russia); Eva Khachaturian; Igor Eremenko	(United Kingdom); Olivia Smart; Joseph Buckland	
2015	(Italy); Sofia Sforza; Leo Luca Sforza	(Czech Republic); Nicole Kuzmich; Alexandr Sinicyn	(Germany); Katharina Müller; Tim Dieck	
2016	(Russia); Sofia Shevchenko; Igor Eremenko	(United States); Eliana Gropman; Ian Somerville	(Czech Republic); Nicole Kuzmich; Alexandr Sinicyn	
2017	(Russia); Ekaterina Kuznetsova; Dmitri Parkhomenko	(Canada); Marjorie Lajoie; Zachary Lagha	(Canada); Ashlynne Stairs; Lee Royer	
2018	(Germany); Ria Schwendinger; Valentin Wunderlich	(France); Natacha Lagouge; Corentin Rahier	(Germany); Charise Matthaei; Maximilian Pfisterer	
2019	(Canada); Marjorie Lajoie; Zachary Lagha	(Canada); Alicia Fabbri; Paul Ayer	(Germany); Charise Matthaei; Maximilian Pfisterer	
2020	(United States); Avonley Nguyen; Vadym Kolesnik	(Canada); Emmy Bronsard; Aissa Bouaraguia	(Canada); Natalie D'Alessandro; Bruce Waddell	
2021	Event cancelled due to the COVID-19 pandemic			
2022	(Cyprus); Angelina Kudryavtseva; Ilia Karankevich	(Italy); Noemi Tali; Stefano Frasca	(Israel); Elizabeth Tkachenko; Alexei Kiliakov	
2023	(Germany); Darya Grimm; Michail Savitskiy	(United States); Leah Neset; Artem Markelov	(United Kingdom); Phebe Bekker; James Hernandez	
2024	(Germany); Darya Grimm; Michail Savitskiy	(Italy); Beatrice Ventura; Stefano Frasca	(Germany); Lilia Schubert; Nikita Remeshevskiy	
2025	(France); Dania Mouaden; Theo Bigot	(Germany); Alexia Kruk; Jan Eisenhaber	(Belgium); Sofiia Beznosikova; Max Leleu	
2026	(France); Ambre Perrier Gianesini; Samuel Blanc Klaperman	(Canada); Layla Veillon; Alexander Brandys	(Italy); Arianna Soldati; Nicholas Tagliabue	
