= Gran Premio Italia 2020–21 (Italian Grand Prix of Figure Skating) =

Italian figure skating competition

2020-21 Gran Premio Italia
- Date: October 2020 – February 2021
- Season: 2020-2021
- Location: Bergamo (First stage); Egna (Second stage); Trento (Third stage); Torino (Fourth stage); Bergamo (Final)
- Host: Italian Ice Sports Federation (FISG)

Champions
- Men's singles: (Italy) Matteo Rizzo
- Ladies' singles: (Italy) Ginevra Negrello
- Pairs: (Italy) Nicole Della Monica / Matteo Guarise
- Ice dance: (Italy) Charlène Guignard / Marco Fabbri

The Gran Premio Italia was a four-event grand prix competition for Italian skaters, as well as invited foreign skaters based in Italy. Skaters were selected to appear at either one or two events, and the highest scoring skaters qualified for the final. Medals were awarded in the disciplines of men's singles, ladies' singles, pair skating, and junior and senior ice dance.

== Competitions ==
On 7 November 2020, the FISG announced that the second stage had been postponed until January 2021, making it the fourth stage of the Gran Premio.

Date	Event	Type	Location
24-25 October 2020	First stage (Prima tappa)	Qualifier	Bergamo
~~21-22 November 2020~~ (postponed)	~~Second stage (Secondo tappa)~~	~~Qualifier~~	~~Torino~~
28-29 November 2020	Second stage (Secondo tappa)	Qualifier	Egna
5-6 December 2020	Third stage (Terza tappa)	Qualifier	Trento
9-10 January 2021	Fourth stage (Quarta tappa)	Qualifier	Torino
13-14 February 2021	Final	Final	Bergamo

== Preliminary Assignments ==
The preliminary assignments were announced by the FISG on October 7, 2020.

=== Men ===
Skater	Assignment(s)
(Italy) Mattia Dalla Torre	First stage, Second stage
(Italy) Alessandro Fadini	Second stage
(Italy) Gabriele Frangipani	First stage, Second stage
(Italy) Daniel Grassl	First stage, Second stage
(Italy) Matteo Rizzo	First stage, Second stage
(Italy) Alberto Vanz	First stage

=== Ladies ===
Skater	Assignment(s)
(Italy) Greta Baldan	Fourth stage
(Italy) Lucrezia Beccari	Third Stage
(Italy) Lucrezia Gennaro	Third stage, Fourth stage
(Italy) Elisabetta Leccardi	First stage, Second stage
(Italy) Lara Naki Gutmann	Second stage, Third stage
(Italy) Ginevra Negrello	First stage, Second stage
(Italy) Alice Orru	Fourth Stage
(Italy) Chenny Paolucci	First stage, Second stage
(Italy) Francesca Poletti	First stage
(Italy) Roberta Rodeghiero	Third stage, Fourth stage
(Italy) Alessia Tornaghi	Third stage, Fourth stage

=== Pairs ===
Skater	Assignment(s)
(Italy) Sara Conti / Niccolo Macii	First stage
(Italy) Rebecca Ghilardi / Filippo Ambrosini	First stage, Second stage
(Italy) Nicole Della Monica / Matteo Guarise	First stage, Second stage
(Italy) Irma Caldara / Marco Santucci	Second stage
(Italy) Vivienne Contarino / Marco Pauletti	Second stage

=== Ice Dance ===
Skater	Assignment(s)
(Italy) Chiara Calderone / Aleksei Dubrovin	Third stage, Fourth stage
(Italy) Charlène Guignard / Marco Fabbri	Third stage, Fourth stage
(Italy) Carolina Moscheni / Francesco Fioretti	Third stage, Fourth stage
(Italy) Katrine Roy / Claudio Pietrantonio	Third stage

=== Junior Ice Dance ===
Skater	Assignment(s)
(Italy) Nicole Calderari / Marco Cilli	Third stage, Fourth stage
(Italy) Sara Campanini / Francesco Riva	Third stage, Fourth stage
(Italy) Giorgia Galimberti / Matteo Mandelli	Third stage
(Italy) Carolina Portesi Peroni / Michael Chrastecky	Third stage, Fourth stage
(Italy) Noemi Tali / Stefano Frasca	Fourth stage
(Italy) Giulia Tuba / Andrea Tuba	Third stage, Fourth stage

== Changes to Preliminary Assignments ==
=== First Stage ===
Date	Discipline	Withdrew	Added	Reason/Other notes	Refs
	Ladies	None	(Lithuania) Greta Morkite	Invited foreign skater	
	Ladies	None	(United Kingdom) Kristen Spours	Invited foreign skater	
	Pairs	None	(Spain) Dorota Broda / Pedro Betegon	Invited foreign skater	
	Men	None	(France) Philip Warren	Invited foreign skater	
24 October	Pairs	(Italy) Nicole Della Monica / Matteo Guarise	None		

=== Second Stage ===
Date	Discipline	Withdrew	Added	Reason/Other notes	Refs
26 November	Ladies	None	(Italy) Lucrezia Beccari		
26 November	Ladies	None	(Italy) Francesca Poletti		
26 November	Pairs	(Italy) Irma Caldara / Marco Santucci	(Italy) Sara Conti / Niccolo Macii		
26 November	Pairs	(Italy) Vivienne Contarino / Marco Pauletti	None		
28 November	Ladies	(Italy) Lara Naki Gutmann	None		

=== Third Stage ===
Date	Discipline	Withdrew	Added	Reason/Other notes	Refs
1 December	Ladies	None	(Italy) Alice Orru		
1 December	Ladies	(Italy) Lucrezia Beccari	(Italy) Noelle Rosa		
1 December	Ice Dance	(Italy) Katrine Roy / Claudio Pietrantonio	None		
1 December	Ice Dance	(Italy) Chiara Calderone / Aleksei Dubrovin	None	Calderone / Dubrovin have split	
1 December	Junior Ice Dance	(Italy) Sara Campanini / Francesco Riva	(Italy) Noemi Tali / Stefano Frasca	Campanini / Riva have split	
1 December	Junior Ice Dance	None	(Italy) Beatrice Ventura / Amedeo Bonetto		
5 December	Ladies	(Italy) Noelle Rosa	None		

=== Fourth Stage ===
Date	Discipline	Withdrew	Added	Reason/Other notes	Refs
30 December	Ladies	None	(Italy) Lucrezia Beccari		
30 December	Ice Dance	(Italy) Chiara Calderone / Aleksei Dubrovin	(Italy) Chiara Calderone / Francesco Riva	Calderone / Dubrovin have split	
30 December	Junior Ice Dance	(Italy) Sara Campanini / Francesco Riva	(Italy) Giorgia Galimberti / Matteo Mandelli	Campanini / Riva have split	
30 December	Junior Ice Dance	None	(Italy) Beatrice Ventura / Amedeo Bonetto		
6 January	Ladies	(Italy) Alice Orru	(Italy) Lara Naki Gutmann		
8 January	Ladies	(Italy) Alessia Tornaghi	None	Tendonitis	
9 January	Ladies	(Italy) Lucrezia Gennaro	None		
9 January	Junior Ice Dance	(Italy) Giorgia Galimberti / Matteo Mandelli	None		

== Medalists ==
Event	Discipline	Gold	Silver	Bronze
First Stage	Men	(Italy) Daniel Grassl	(Italy) Matteo Rizzo	(Italy) Gabriele Frangipani
First Stage	Ladies	(Italy) Ginevra Negrello	(Italy) Elisabetta Leccardi	(United Kingdom) Kristen Spours
First Stage	Pairs	(Italy) Rebecca Ghilardi / Filippo Ambrosini	(Italy) Sara Conti / Niccolo Macii	(Spain) Dorota Broda / Pedro Betegon
First Stage	Ice Dance	No competition held		
First Stage	Junior Ice Dance	No competition held		

Event	Discipline	Gold	Silver	Bronze
Second Stage	Men	(Italy) Daniel Grassl	(Italy) Matteo Rizzo	(Italy) Gabriele Frangipani
Second Stage	Ladies	(Italy) Ginevra Negrello	(Italy) Lucrezia Beccari	(Italy) Elisabetta Leccardi
Second Stage	Pairs	(Italy) Nicole Della Monica / Matteo Guarise	(Italy) Sara Conti / Niccolo Macii	(Italy) Rebecca Ghilardi / Filippo Ambrosini
Second Stage	Ice Dance	No competition held		
Second Stage	Junior Ice Dance	No competition held		

Event	Discipline	Gold	Silver	Bronze
Third Stage	Men	No competition held		
Third Stage	Ladies	(Italy) Lara Naki Gutmann	(Italy) Alessia Tornaghi	(Italy) Roberta Rodeghiero
Third Stage	Pairs	No competition held		
Third Stage	Ice Dance	(Italy) Charlène Guignard / Marco Fabbri	(Italy) Carolina Moscheni / Francesco Fioretti	No Other Competitors
Third Stage	Junior Ice Dance	(Italy) Carolina Portesi Peroni / Michael Chrastecky	(Italy) Nicole Calderari / Marco Cilli	(Italy) Noemi Talli / Stefano Frasca

Event	Discipline	Gold	Silver	Bronze
Fourth Stage	Men	No competition held		
Fourth Stage	Ladies	(Italy) Lara Naki Gutmann	(Italy) Lucrezia Beccari	(Italy) Roberta Rodeghiero
Fourth Stage	Pairs	No competition held		
Fourth Stage	Ice Dance	(Italy) Charlène Guignard / Marco Fabbri	(Italy) Carolina Moscheni / Francesco Fioretti	(Italy) Chiara Calderone / Francesco Riva
Fourth Stage	Junior Ice Dance	(Italy) Carolina Portesi Peroni / Michael Chrastecky	(Italy) Nicole Calderari / Marco Cilli	(Italy) Noemi Talli / Stefano Frasca

Event	Discipline	Gold	Silver	Bronze
Final	Men	(Italy) Matteo Rizzo	(Italy) Daniel Grassl	(Italy) Gabriele Frangipani
Final	Ladies	(Italy) Ginevra Negrello	(Italy) Lara Naki Gutmann	(Italy) Lucrezia Beccari
Final	Pairs	(Italy) Nicole Della Monica / Matteo Guarise	(Italy) Rebecca Ghilardi / Filippo Ambrosini	(Italy) Sara Conti / Niccolo Macii
Final	Ice Dance	(Italy) Charlène Guignard / Marco Fabbri	(Italy) Carolina Moscheni / Francesco Fioretti	No Other Competitors
Final	Junior Ice Dance	(Italy) Carolina Portesi Peroni / Michael Chrastecky	(Italy) Nicole Calderari / Marco Cilli	(Italy) Noemi Talli / Stefano Frasca

== Qualification ==
At each event, skaters earned points toward qualification for the final and at the conclusion of the Fourth Stage, the FISG announced the athletes who had qualified to the final. The top 6 ladies, 4 men, 3 pairs, 2 ice dance and 3 junior ice dance teams qualified for the final. The points earned per placement were as follows:

Placement	Points (Singles and Ice Dance)	Points (Pairs)
1st	6	5
2nd	4	4
3rd	3	3
4th	1	1

In the event of a tie, the skater or team who earned the best placement would advance. If there was a further tie, the best total score would be taken into account.

=== Qualification standings ===
The following skaters have qualified to the final.

Points	Men	Ladies	Pairs	Ice Dance	Junior Ice Dance
12	(Italy) Daniel Grassl	(Italy) Ginevra Negrello (Italy) Lara Naki Gutmann		(Italy) Charlène Guignard / Marco Fabbri	(Italy) Carolina Portesi Peroni / Michael Chrastecky
8	(Italy) Matteo Rizzo	(Italy) Lucrezia Beccari	(Italy) Rebecca Ghilardi / Filippo Ambrosini	(Italy) Carolina Moscheni / Francesco Fioretti	(Italy) Nicole Calderari / Marco Cilli
7		(Italy) Elisabetta Leccardi	(Italy) Sara Conti / Niccolo Macii		
6	(Italy) Gabriele Frangipani	(Italy) Roberta Rodeghiero			(Italy) Noemi Talli / Stefano Frasca
5			(Italy) Nicole Della Monica / Matteo Guarise		
4		(Italy) Alessia Tornaghi			
1	(Italy) Mattia Dalla Torre				

== Full Results ==
=== First Stage ===
==== Men ====
Rank	Name	Nation	Total points	SP		FS	
1	Daniel Grassl	Italy	284.99	1	95.72	1	189.27
2	Matteo Rizzo	Italy	214.01	2	77.04	3	136.97
3	Gabriele Frangipani	Italy	206.82	3	68.51	2	138.31
4	Philip Warren	France	175.69	4	63.39	5	112.30
5	Mattia Dalla Torre	Italy	171.44	5	57.28	4	114.16
6	Alberto Vanz	Italy	135.33	6	50.70	6	84.63

==== Ladies ====
Rank	Name	Nation	Total points	SP		FS	
1	Ginevra Negrello	Italy	164.05	1	56.77	1	107.28
2	Elisabetta Leccardi	Italy	143.41	2	53.26	4	90.15
3	Kristen Spours	United Kingdom	143.16	3	50.58	3	92.58
4	Francesca Poletti	Italy	141.00	4	47.98	2	93.02
5	Greta Morkite	Lithuania	135.52	5	47.49	5	88.03
WD	Chenny Paolucci	Italy	withdrew	6	36.25	withdrew	

==== Pairs ====
Rank	Name	Nation	Total points	SP		FS	
1	Rebecca Ghilardi / Filippo Ambrosini	Italy	159.03	1	54.22	1	104.81
2	Sara Conti / Niccolo Macii	Italy	138.82	2	51.23	2	87.59
3	Dorota Broda / Pedro Betegon	Spain	122.18	3	39.96	3	82.22

=== Second Stage ===
==== Men ====
Rank	Name	Nation	Total points	SP		FS	
1	Daniel Grassl	Italy	270.38	1	93.48	1	176.90
2	Matteo Rizzo	Italy	250.02	2	81.39	2	168.63
3	Gabriele Frangipani	Italy	226.18	3	73.28	3	152.90
4	Alessandro Fadini	Italy	196.35	4	68.03	4	128.32
5	Mattia Dalla Torre	Italy	179.98	5	54.39	5	125.59

==== Ladies ====
Rank	Name	Nation	Total points	SP		FS	
1	Ginevra Negrello	Italy	176.31	2	55.18	1	121.13
2	Lucrezia Beccari	Italy	168.94	1	62.79	2	106.15
3	Elisabetta Leccardi	Italy	151.00	3	53.65	3	97.35
4	Francesca Poletti	Italy	112.20	4	43.65	4	68.55

==== Pairs ====
Rank	Name	Nation	Total points	SP		FS	
1	Nicole Della Monica / Matteo Guarise	Italy	194.92	1	72.68	1	122.24
2	Sara Conti / Niccolo Macii	Italy	163.27	3	57.18	2	106.09
3	Rebecca Ghilardi / Filippo Ambrosini	Italy	161.40	2	58.58	3	102.82

=== Third Stage ===
==== Ladies ====
Rank	Name	Nation	Total points	SP		FS	
1	Lara Naki Gutmann	Italy	173.31	1	65.92	1	107.39
2	Alessia Tornaghi	Italy	161.60	2	63.89	2	97.71
3	Roberta Rodeghiero	Italy	144.43	3	51.57	3	92.86
4	Lucrezia Gennaro	Italy	142.83	4	51.55	4	91.28
5	Alice Orru	Italy	117.23	5	39.76	5	77.47

==== Ice Dance ====
Rank	Name	Nation	Total points	SP		FD	
1	Charlène Guignard / Marco Fabbri	Italy	223.82	1	90.08	1	133.74
2	Carolina Moscheni / Francesco Fioretti	Italy	163.50	2	66.21	2	97.29

==== Junior Ice Dance ====
Rank	Name	Nation	Total points	SP		FD	
1	Carolina Portesi Peroni / Michael Chrastecky	Italy	151.32	1	60.81	1	90.51
2	Nicole Calderari / Marco Cilli	Italy	143.91	2	57.17	2	86.74
3	Noemi Talli / Stefano Frasca	Italy	137.92	3	52.11	3	85.81
4	Giulia Tuba / Andrea Tuba	Italy	127.90	4	51.65	4	76.25
5	Giorgia Galimberti / Matteo Mandelli	Italy	126.13	5	50.01	5	76.12
6	Beatrice Ventura / Amedeo Bonetto	Italy	95.52	6	42.89	6	52.63

=== Fourth Stage ===
==== Ladies ====
Rank	Name	Nation	Total points	SP		FS	
1	Lara Naki Gutmann	Italy	178.49	3	55.73	1	122.76
2	Lucrezia Beccari	Italy	173.36	1	65.20	2	108.16
3	Roberta Rodeghiero	Italy	161.54	2	59.92	3	101.62
4	Greta Baldan	Italy	137.55	4	49.27	4	88.28

==== Ice Dance ====
Rank	Name	Nation	Total points	SP		FD	
1	Charlène Guignard / Marco Fabbri	Italy	226.87	1	90.80	1	136.07
2	Carolina Moscheni / Francesco Fioretti	Italy	171.04	2	68.76	2	102.28
3	Chiara Calderone / Francesco Riva	Italy	164.18	3	63.79	3	100.39

==== Junior Ice Dance ====
Rank	Name	Nation	Total points	SP		FD	
1	Carolina Portesi Peroni / Michael Chrastecky	Italy	161.23	1	65.35	1	95.88
2	Nicole Calderari / Marco Cilli	Italy	153.13	2	59.95	2	93.18
3	Noemi Talli / Stefano Frasca	Italy	146.10	3	57.52	3	88.58
4	Giulia Tuba / Andrea Tuba	Italy	132.08	4	51.54	4	80.54
5	Beatrice Ventura / Amedeo Bonetto	Italy	107.42	5	43.03	5	64.39

=== Final ===
==== Men ====
Rank	Name	Nation	Total points	SP		FS	
1	Matteo Rizzo	Italy	260.10	1	94.09	2	166.01
2	Daniel Grassl	Italy	252.88	2	85.32	1	167.56
3	Gabriele Frangipani	Italy	220.72	3	70.75	3	149.97
4	Mattia Dalla Torre	Italy	159.92	4	55.35	4	104.57

==== Ladies ====
Rank	Name	Nation	Total points	SP		FS	
1	Ginevra Negrello	Italy	186.86	1	63.25	2	123.61
2	Lara Naki Gutmann	Italy	182.86	3	59.14	1	123.72
3	Lucrezia Beccari	Italy	171.80	4	57.66	3	114.14
4	Alessia Tornaghi	Italy	169.78	2	61.75	4	108.03
5	Roberta Rodeghiero	Italy	129.33	5	48.28	6	81.05
6	Francesca Poletti	Italy	123.14	6	40.93	5	82.21

==== Pairs ====
Rank	Name	Nation	Total points	SP		FS	
1	Nicole Della Monica / Matteo Guarise	Italy	188.63	1	67.37	1	121.26
2	Rebecca Ghilardi / Filippo Ambrosini	Italy	172.78	2	59.29	2	113.49
3	Sara Conti / Niccolo Macii	Italy	154.29	3	50.54	3	103.75

==== Ice Dance ====
Rank	Name	Nation	Total points	SP		FD	
1	Charlène Guignard / Marco Fabbri	Italy	218.19	1	88.96	1	129.23
2	Carolina Moscheni / Francesco Fioretti	Italy	165.94	2	65.77	2	100.17

==== Junior Ice Dance ====
Rank	Name	Nation	Total points	SP		FD	
1	Carolina Portesi Peroni / Michael Chrastecky	Italy	152.67	1	61.32	1	91.35
2	Nicole Calderari / Marco Cilli	Italy	143.65	2	57.25	2	86.40
3	Noemi Talli / Stefano Frasca	Italy	130.44	3	49.92	3	80.52
