= Philippe Decouflé =

French choreographer, dancer, mime artist and theatre director

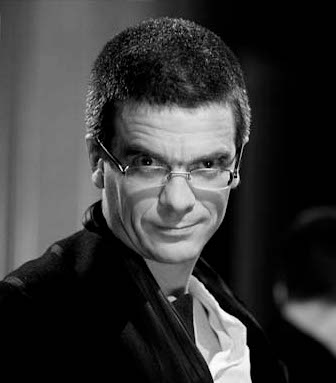
- Decouflé in 2006
- Born: 22 October 1961 (age 64); Neuilly-sur-Seine, Paris, France
- Occupations: Director, choreographer, writer

Philippe Decouflé (born 22 October 1961) is a French choreographer, dancer, mime artist, and theatre director. As a child he travelled extensively around Lebanon and Morocco before learning his skills as a teenager at the Annie Fratellini École du Cirque and the Marceau Mime School. While frequenting Parisienne nightclubs he discovered and was attracted to contemporary dance, and he eventually moved to the Centre National de la Danse Contemporaine in Angers to study under choreographer Alwin Nicolais. After briefly working as a solo dancer, he formed the Découflé Company of Arts in Bagnolet in 1983, moving it to a former electrical works in the Parisienne suburb of Saint-Denis in 1995.

He has worked for the Lyon Opera Ballet, and he choreographed the music video for New Order's "True Faith" and Fine Young Cannibals' "She Drives Me Crazy". The former won the "Best Music Video" prize at the 1988 BRIT Awards, while his advertisement for Polaroid won a "Silver Lion" prize at the 1989 Venice Film Festival. On the back of these successes, he was selected to choreograph the opening and closing ceremonies of the 1992 Winter Olympics in front of a global television audience of over two billion people, the 50th anniversary Cannes Film Festival in 1997, and a parade for the 2007 Rugby Union World Cup in Saint-Denis in Paris.

Decouflé is the writer and director of the Cirque du Soleil show Iris.

Decouflé is also the director of the Cirque du Soleil show Paramour which debuted in 2016 in New York City. Scenes from Iris were incorporated into Paramour.

== Decorations ==
- Commander of the Order of Arts and Letters (2015)
