= Iris (Cirque du Soleil) =

Former Cirque du Soleil production

Coordinates: 34°06′09.75″N 118°20′24.5″W

- Logo for Cirque du Soleil's Iris
- Company: Cirque du Soleil
- Genre: Contemporary circus
- Show type: Resident show
- Date of premiere: September 25, 2011
- Final show: January 19, 2013
- Location: Dolby Theatre, Los Angeles

Creative team
- Writer and director: Philippe Decouflé
- Director of creation: Jean-François Bouchard
- Set designer: Jean Rabasse
- Costume designer: Philippe Guillotel
- Composer: Danny Elfman
- Choreographer: Daphné Mauger
- Lighting designer: Patrice Besombes
- Props designer: Anne-Séguin Poirier
- Projections designers: Olivier Simola; Christophe Waksmann
- Sound designer: François Bergeron
- Acrobatic performance designers: Boris Verkhovsky; Shana Carroll
- Acrobatic rigging and equipment designer: Pierre Masse
- Artistic guide: Guy Laliberté
- Make-up designer: Nathalie Gagné

Other information
- Preceded by: Zarkana (2011)
- Succeeded by: Michael Jackson: The Immortal World Tour (2011)
- Official website

Iris (also known as Iris: A Journey Through the World of Cinema) was a resident Cirque du Soleil show based in Los Angeles, California. It premiered on September 25, 2011, after preview performances which began on July 21, 2011. The cost for production of the show was nearly $100 million, which included the cost of renovating the Dolby Theatre in which the show was housed. Iris was written and directed by French director-choreographer Philippe Decouflé. The show explored images from the history of cinema and featured elaborate choreography, acrobatics, and a variety of contemporary circus acts. The name of the show, Iris, comes from the camera diaphragm as well as from the colored iris of the human eye.

In November 2012 it was reported that Iris would end its run at the Dolby Theatre on January 19, 2013 due to disappointing ticket sales. It was later reported that Cirque du Soleil looked into the possibility of taking Iris to other cities in the United States.

Scenes from Iris were later incorporated into Cirque du Soleil’s first musical Paramour, which debuted on Broadway in New York City on May 25, 2016.

== History ==
Although Iris was in development for some time, the artists and creation team started preparations in Spain. At the beginning of March 2009, production and operations personnel started working in Montréal. During this time, the productions and the acrobatics continued to refine the show and artists continued training until the end of April, when they moved to Los Angeles as well to continue preparing for the show's premiere.

Cirque du Soleil employed 125 orchestral musicians to create the pre-recorded portions of the soundtrack.

=== In popular culture ===
- Acrobats from Iris performed the Kiriki act on America's Got Talent on September 14, 2011.

== Set and technical information ==
Cirque du Soleil had to modify the 9,600-square-foot (890 m^{2}) stage in the theater at a cost of US$40,000,000 (equivalent to $57,248,521 in 2025), primarily to create stage lifts. To accommodate the lifts, 44-foot (13 m) deep pits were excavated. This changed the sets' space to measure 122 feet (37 m) from the high grid to the bottom of the pits. Cirque also removed seating from the theater, reducing seat counts from 3400 to 2500, in order to give all spectators the same viewing experience. The creative team used 174 loudspeakers, 603 lighting features, 20 video projectors, and 166,000 watts of sound in the Iris production. The design of the "set suggests a fairground attraction inspired by Coney Island where movies were screened to an audience for the first time."

== Cast ==
The Iris troupe consisted of several performers, including Olympic athletes. Principal characters included:

- Buster: a composer in search of true love.
- Scarlett: a naïve actress who longs to be a movie star.

== Acts ==
According to the show creators, the acts of Iris are meant to evoke the sense of wonder of the cinema.

- Aerial straps duo
- Shadows and contortion
- Hand to hand
- Filmstrip
- Kiriki: a modern version of Icarian games
- Movie set
- Trapeze and broom manipulation
- Trampoline (The Rooftops)
- Hand balancing
- Aerial ball
- Icarian Games

== Costumes ==
Philippe Guillotel drew inspiration from numerous venues whose central theme was that of cinema. Through this extensive research into cinema's history, his design team was able to create costumes which impress upon the viewer the evolution of color film. The team created a few unusual costumes for the hybrid characters:

- The two camera men have cameras mounted on their head or chest. Their live camera footage becomes part of the show at times.
- The sound man wears a large carbon fiber cone.
- The screen man has a 135 square feet (12.5 m^{2}) screen that tucks inside his stomach.
- Another character's costume was inspired by the first sound equipment used to detect the sounds of bombs.

The primary materials for this show included soft Lycra, silk stretch nylon, and natural cottons and linens. Philippe also used leather and high-tech materials such as carbon fiber for accent pieces, but stayed true to the use of the primary material selection.

- The influence of Dick Tracy can be seen in the rooftops act, especially in the coloring of the costumes.
- One female character, portrayed by actress Ekaterina Pirogovskaya, wore a skirt based on the zoetrope and praxinoscope that showed two boxers fighting as the skirt twirled.
- The aerial ballet act costumes are made of nearly one million Swarovski crystals.
- The costumes for the Icarian games, or Kiriki, characters are inspired by the costumes worn in Georges Méliès films.
- In addition to the hybrid characters of the camera men, sound man, screen man, and the sound equipment persona, there are also two chairs, a lamp, a table, and moose head on a wall that are personified.
- In addition to cinema itself, some of the costumes pay tribute to the other professions associated with it, including screenwriters, makeup artists, cinematographers, carpenters, decorators, painters, electricians, and lighting designers.

== Music ==
Iris' soundtrack was created by Danny Elfman. The music is created by pre-recorded music from a blend of 100 orchestral musicians (the largest in Cirque du Soleil's history) spread over both large and small ensembles, mixed with the show's eight live, in-house musicians. Below are the 17 track titles from the official soundtrack album, which was originally released in 2011.

1. Buster's Big Opening
2. The Twins (Aerial straps)
3. Kiriki Film (Kiriki intro)
4. Kiriki
5. Silent Movie
6. Patterns (Hand to hand)
7. Clown Special Effects
8. Pellicule - Part I and II (Film strip scene)
9. Snake Women (Contortion)
10. Movie Studio (Movie studio scene)
11. The Broom (Solo trapeze intro)
12. Flying Scarlett (Solo trapeze)
13. Old Toys
14. Film Noir / Pursuit (Film noir scene)
15. Rooftops (Trampolines)
16. Scarlett Balancing (Hand balancing on canes)
17. Iris Finale and Bows

== Critical reception ==
J.C Maçek III of PopMatters wrote, "The true and easily missed, almost meta-fictional genius of IRIS is that from the dawn of cinema, the stage and the screen have been linked in more ways than nomenclature and architecture."

Charles McNulty of the Los Angeles Times said, "“Iris” is a more luxurious elixir, but in paying homage to the fantasy of film, the show incarnates those same stardust properties that make movies so everlastingly potent."
