= Ruby Lewis =

American actress and singer

- Born: United States
- Occupations: Singer, actor

Ruby Lewis is an American actress and singer. Her work is largely based in musicals and television. She is from Shelbyville, Kentucky.

She is known for such television shows as Desperate Housewives, Masters of Sex, Girl Meets World, and Rules of Engagement.

Her work in musicals includes the Cirque du Soleil production Paramour, the musical Baz (based upon the works of Baz Luhrmann), and the touring cast of We Will Rock You.
