= Paramour (Cirque du Soleil) =

Cirque du Soleil musical

- Logo for Cirque du Soleil's Paramour
- Company: Cirque du Soleil
- Genre: Contemporary circus
- Show type: Resident show
- Date of premiere: May 25, 2016
- Location: Various residencies

Creative team
- Director: Philippe Decouflé
- Creative guide: Jean-François Bouchard
- Associate Creative Directors: Pascale Henrot and West Hyler
- Set designer: Jean Rabasse
- Costume designer: Philippe Guillotel
- Composers: Guy Dubuc and Marc Lessard
- Choreographer: Daphné Mauger
- Flying Machine Design and Choreography: Verity Studios
- Lighting designers: Patrice Besombes and Howell Binkley
- Props designer: Anne‐Séguin Poirier
- Projection designers: Olivier Simola and Christophe Waksmann
- Sound designer: John Shivers
- Acrobatic performance designers: Shana Carroll and Boris Verkhovsky
- Rigging and acrobatic equipment designer: Pierre Masse
- Makeup designer: Nathalie Gagné

Other information
- Preceded by: Toruk (2015)
- Succeeded by: Luzia (2016)
- Official website

Paramour was Cirque du Soleil's first resident musical theatre show at the Lyric Theatre on Broadway, New York City. Paramour was themed to the "Golden age of Hollywood" and followed the life of "a poet who is forced to choose between love and art". It was conceived by Philippe Decouflé with West Hyler as Storywriter. It had similar elements to Cirque du Soleil's retired Los Angeles resident show in Iris (which was also themed on cinema) written and created by Philippe Decouflé, and had a 38-person onstage cast with actress Ruby Lewis in the lead as Indigo. Paramour began preview shows on April 16, 2016, with an official premiere on May 25, 2016. It closed exactly one year after its first preview show, on 16 April 2017.

During previews, Paramour got off to a strong start and grossed over $1 million in its first six shows.

The show was directed by French director-choreographer Philippe Decouflé, who was also the director of the cinema themed Cirque du Soleil show Iris, with West Hyler as Scene Director. Scenes from Iris, such as aerial straps performed by the Atherton twins (who also performed in Iris), were incorporated into Paramour, but the show added many new elements for the Broadway production: including a book-driven love story narrative, live musicians, and professional actors in lead roles; but with the Cirque du Soleil aesthetic integrated throughout the show. Original songs were created by Andreas Carlsson.

The show closed on Broadway on 16 April 2017 after 31 previews and 366 performances. Despite average box office sales, Cirque was allegedly paid $23 million to terminate its contract early, in order to vacate the Lyric and allow for the necessary renovations for the show's successor, Harry Potter and the Cursed Child which had a sold out track record since opening on the West End.

Paramour reopened in April 2019 in Hamburg, Germany.

== Music ==
The show's original Broadway cast recording was released on 16 Aug 2016, on digital format and on streaming services.

Track titles, as they appear in order on the official soundtrack, are:

1. The Hollywood Wiz
2. Ginger Top
3. Something More
4. AJ's Blues
5. The Muse
6. Serenade from a Window
7. The Honeymoon Days of Fame
8. Cleopatra
9. Egyptian Gift
10. Help a Girl Choose
11. The Dream
12. Revenge Fantasies
13. Love Triangle
14. Writer's Block
15. Everything (The Lovers Theme)
16. Nyc Rooftops
17. Reel Love
18. Everything (Reprise)

== Critical reception ==
Charles Isherwood of The New York Times wrote "The athletic circus acts that are laced throughout the show provide the real entertainment, and make the surrounding book scenes and songs feel even more bogus and synthetic," and "There’s no denying the breathtaking magic of seeing bodies swim through the air with such apparent weightlessness. Too bad the musical surrounding them feels just as weightless, and far more forgettable."

Maren Wade of Las Vegas Weekly wrote "I think what made Paramour truly special was the unique element of the acrobatics in a more real-life setting. It felt like one minute I was watching a big Broadway show, but all of a sudden these crazy acrobatics would happen in scenes and scenarios where they were least expected," adding "I loved the show and would highly recommend it to anyone who is a Broadway and Cirque fan."

Rex Reed of New York Observer said "If your demands are not high and you don’t try to make too much sense of the wobbly so-called “plot,” there's a lot of skill on view here that is fun to watch. Paramour is a dream conceived by P. T. Barnum and revised by Bob Fosse, and some of it works even better on a Broadway stage than in a tent."

In Variety Marilyn Stasio wrote, "'Paramour' is an ambitious departure from the company’s tried-and-true spectacle formula, in that it observes the structural conventions of a legit Broadway musical. The show has a book (corny), a score of show tunes (mindless), and a cast of singing and dancing actors playing recognizable character roles. More happily, it also has those aerialists, acrobats, jugglers, and tumblers we love — and plenty of spectacle."
