= Chiara Calderone =

Italian ice dancer

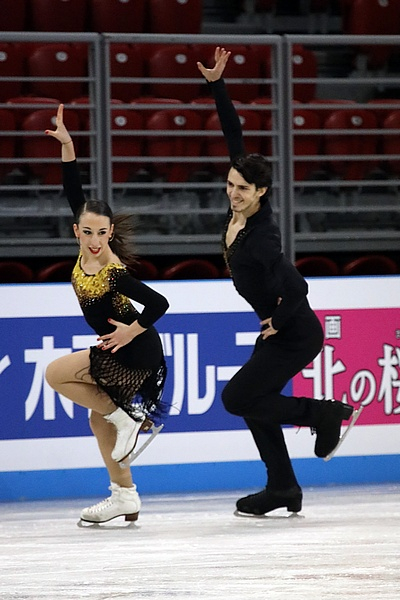

Personal information
- Born: 10 February 1999 (age 27) Milan, Italy
- Height: 1.60 m (5 ft 3 in)

Figure skating career
- Country: Italy
- Partner: Francesco Riva
- Coach: Matteo Zanni; Barbara Riboldi; Paola Mezzadri
- Skating club: Agora Skating Team
- Began skating: 2003
- Retired: 2021

Medal record
Italian Championships
Bronze medal – third place	2021 Egna	Ice dance

Chiara Calderone (born 10 February 1999) is a former Italian ice dancer. With her former skating partner, Pietro Papetti, she is the 2019 Egna Dance Trophy silver medalist and 2018 Open d'Andorra bronze medalist. Earlier in their career, Calderone/Papetti won the Italian national junior title and placed 13th at the 2018 World Junior Championships.

== Programs ==
=== Ice dancing with Papetti ===
Season	Rhythm dance	Free dance
2018–2019	Obertura; Adiós Nonino by Astor Piazzolla; Encanto Rojo	Starman by David Bowie; Space Oddity by David Bowie
	Short dance	
2017–2018	Samba: Rebelado performed by Latin Club; Cha Cha: Banca Banca performed by E-Type; Samba: Mujer Latina performed by Thalía choreo. by Matteo Zanni, Gianni Scandiffio	Poeta en el mar by Vicente Amigo; Farruca sin baile by El Trini; Farruca by Pepe Romero choreo. by Matteo Zanni, Gianni Scandiffio

=== Ladies' singles ===
Season	Short program	Free skating
2016–2017	Game of Thrones by Ramin Djawadi	Nyah (from Mission: Impossible 2) by Hans Zimmer; Americano by Lady Gaga
2015–2016	Young and Beautiful by Lana Del Rey; A Little Party Never Killed Nobody by Fergie, Q-Tip, GoonRock	Papa, Can You Hear Me? (from Yentl) performed by Barbra Streisand

== Competitive highlights ==
CS: Challenger Series; JGP: Junior Grand Prix

=== With Riva ===
International
Event	20–21	21-22
CS Lombardia Trophy		WD
Egna Dance Trophy	4th	
National
Italian Champ.	3rd	

=== Ice dancing with Papetti ===
International
Event	2017–18	2018–19	2019–20
CS Lombardia		9th	8th
Universiade		8th	
Egna Trophy		2nd	
Open d'Andorra		3rd	
Volvo Open Cup		9th	
International: Junior
Junior Worlds	13th		
JGP Croatia	6th		
JGP Italy	7th		
Egna Trophy	3rd		
Halloween Cup	4th		
Open d'Andorra	6th		
National
Italian Champ.	1st J	4th	

=== Single skating ===
International
Event	12–13	13–14	14–15	15–16	16–17
CS Lombardia			13th		
Coupe Printemps				4th	
Gardena Trophy			4th	7th	
Hellmut Seibt				13th	
Merano Cup			8th	9th	8th
Santa Claus Cup			4th	7th	
International: Junior
JGP Austria				17th	
JGP Germany					14th
JGP Russia					13th
Gardena Trophy		9th			
Hellmut Seibt		7th			
Santa Claus Cup		2nd			
Skate Celje		7th			
Skate Helena			2nd		
National
Italian Champ.	13th J	4th J	5th	5th	7th
