= Ivan Shmuratko =

Ukrainian figure skater

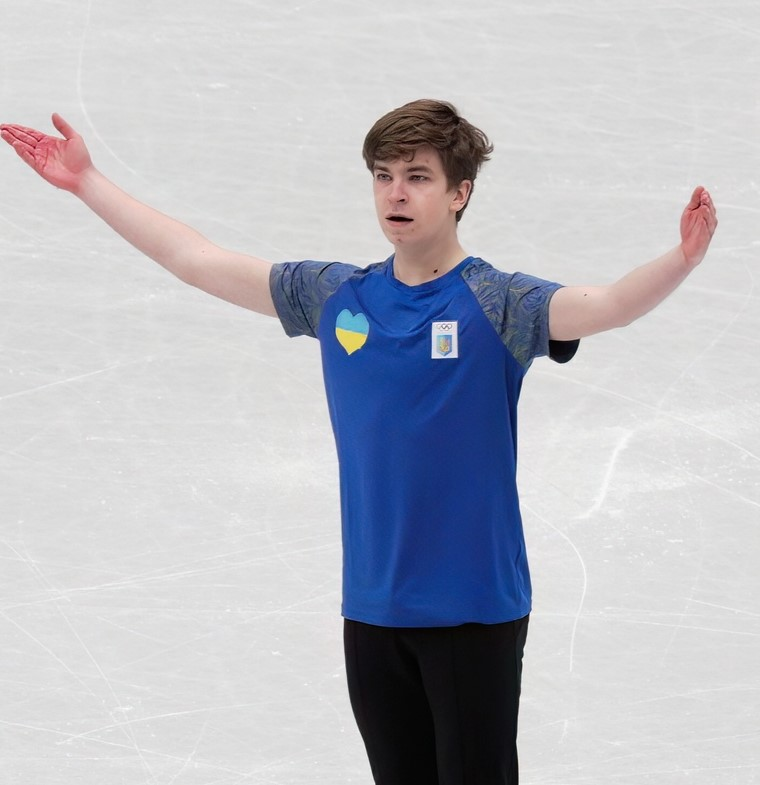
- Ivan Shmuratko at the 2022 World Championships, weeks following the Russian invasion of Ukraine

Personal information
- Native name: Іван Олексійович Шмуратко
- Full name: Ivan Oleksiyovych Shmuratko
- Born: December 21, 2001 (age 24) Kyiv, Ukraine
- Height: 1.76 m (5 ft 9 in)

Figure skating career
- Country: Ukraine
- Discipline: Men's singles
- Coach: Mykhailo Leiba; Ivan Shmuratko
- Skating club: Leader Kyiv
- Began skating: 2006

Medal record
Ukrainian Championships
Gold medal – first place	2019 Kyiv	Singles
Gold medal – first place	2020 Kyiv	Singles
Gold medal – first place	2021 Kyiv	Singles
Gold medal – first place	2022 Kyiv	Singles
Silver medal – second place	2024 Bohuslav	Singles
Silver medal – second place	2026 Bohuslav	Singles
Bronze medal – third place	2017 Kyiv	Singles
Bronze medal – third place	2018 Kyiv	Singles
Winter Youth Olympics
Silver medal – second place	2016 Hamar	Team

Ivan Oleksiyovych Shmuratko (Ukrainian: Іван Олексійович Шмуратко, born December 21, 2001) is a Ukrainian figure skater. He is the 2024 CS Warsaw Cup bronze medalist, 2018 Volvo Open Cup bronze medalist, 2018 Bosphorus Cup silver medalist, and four-time Ukrainian national champion (2019–22). He has competed in the final segment at six ISU Championships and represented Ukraine at the 2022 Winter Olympics.

On the junior level, he is the 2019 JGP Italy bronze medalist and silver medalist in the team event at the 2016 Youth Olympics.

== Personal life ==
Shmuratko was born on December 21, 2001, in Kyiv, Ukraine. He has a younger brother named Ilya.

He is fluent in Russian, Ukrainian, and English.

== Career ==
=== Early years ===
Shmuratko started learning to skate in 2006 at the age of four and a half years old after his parents signed him up for the sport on the advice of his doctors to improve the catarrhal diseases that he suffered from as a child. In the 2014–15 season, he won bronze at the Ukrainian Junior Championships.

=== 2015–16 season: Junior international debut ===
Coached by Vira Volpova in Kyiv, Shmuratko won two junior international medals: gold at the Ice Star and silver at the Santa Claus Cup. Competing at the senior level, he finished 4th at the Ukrainian Championships. He was named to Ukraine's team to the 2016 Winter Youth Olympics in Lillehammer. There, he placed 14th in men's singles and won a silver medal as part of the team event as a member of Team Future, which also included Diāna Ņikitina of Latvia, Anna Dušková and Martin Bidař of the Czech Republic, and Julia Wagret and Mathieu Couyras of France.

=== 2018–19 season: Senior international debut, first Ukrainian national title ===
Shmuratko opened his season on the ISU Junior Grand Prix series, placing 10th in Lithuania and 7th in Armenia. In November, making his senior international debut, he won bronze at the Volvo Open Cup in Latvia. The following month, he received medals at two senior events – silver at the Bosphorus Cup in Turkey and gold at the Ukrainian Championships. In January, he competed at his first ISU Championship, the 2019 European Championships in Minsk, Belarus. He qualified to the final segment and placed twenty-second overall. He also advanced to the free skate at the 2019 World Junior Championships, which took place in March in Zagreb, Croatia. Ranked thirteenth in the short and seventeenth in the free, he finished sixteenth overall.

=== 2019–20 season ===
Shmuratko started his season on the ISU Junior Grand Prix series, placing seventh in Poland, and winning the bronze in Italy with a personal best score. In October, he competed at the Halloween Cup, winning the silver medal. In December, he won his second straight senior national title. He was named to the 2020 European Figure Skating Championships but withdrew. He placed fifteenth at the 2020 World Junior Figure Skating Championships. Shmuratko was assigned to compete at the World Championships in Montreal, Canada, but these were cancelled as a result of the coronavirus pandemic.

=== 2020–21 season ===
With pandemic-related travel restrictions limiting where skaters could compete, Shmuratko began the season at a European-only 2020 Nebelhorn Trophy, where he placed twelfth. After winning his third consecutive Ukrainian national title, Shmuratko competed at the 2021 World Championships in Stockholm, Sweden, placing twenty-first. His result qualified a men's berth for Ukraine at the 2022 Winter Olympics in Beijing, China.

=== 2021–22 season: Beijing Olympics ===
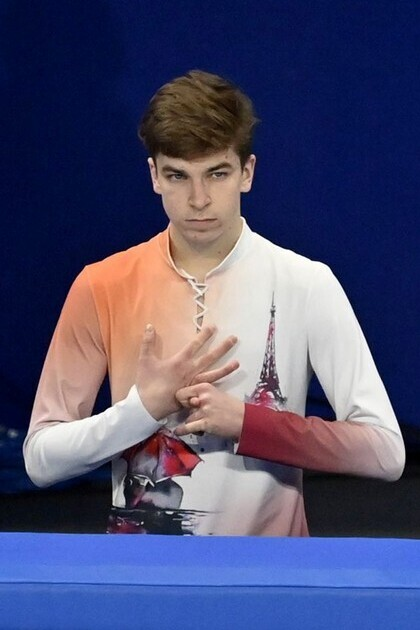
Shmuratko at the 2022 Winter Olympics

On the Challenger series, Shmuratko was fifth at the 2021 Denis Ten Memorial Challenge and seventeenth at the 2021 Warsaw Cup. After winning the Ukrainian national title again, he was named to the Ukrainian Olympic team and placed twelfth at the 2022 European Championships.

Shmuratko tested positive for COVID-19 upon arrival in Beijing and so was unable to participate in the Olympic team event.

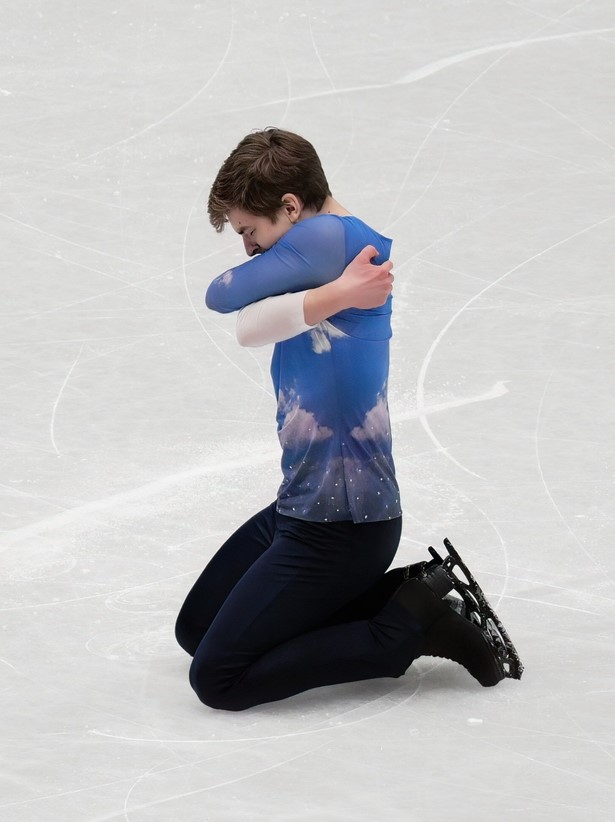
Shmuratko finishing his free skate at the 2022 World Championships

He stated that he was asymptomatic and hoped to be cleared to compete in the later men's event. Shmuratko subsequently was allowed to resume competition, placing twenty-second in the short program to qualify to the free skate. He finished twenty-fourth overall.

Returning to Kyiv following the Olympics, Shmuratko soon found himself in the midst of Russia's invasion, with his home city being one of the largest points of conflict. Despite the war and the resultant limitations on his training, Shmurtako still traveled to attend the 2022 World Championships in Montpellier, France, a journey that took three days. He received a standing ovation from the crowd and qualified for the free program, ultimately finishing twenty-third overall. On his decision to attend, he said, "it's important for Ukraine to have athletes who represent it on the international scene."

=== 2022–23 season: Grand Prix debut ===
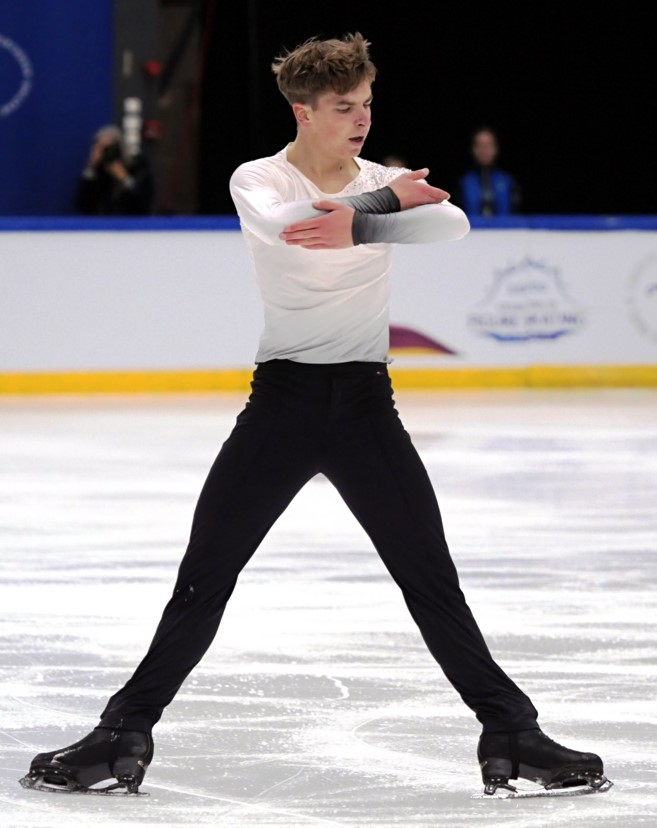
Shmuratko performing a spread eagle at the 2022 CS Finlandia Trophy

Following the World Championships, Shmuratko spent April training at Club Olympique de Courbevoie in Paris, on the invitation of Ukrainian emigrant pair skater Denys Strekalin. He subsequently relocated his training base to Oberstdorf, Germany, adding coaches Michael Huth, Robert Dierking, and Anna Bernauer to his team. Beginning the season, he placed seventh and sixth at 2022 Nebelhorn Trophy and 2022 Finlandia Trophy. Before making his senior Grand Prix debut at the 2022 Grand Prix de France, Shmuratko once again relocated back to Courbevoie, France, with Laurent Depouilly and Nathalie Depouilly becoming his coaches. He subsequently finished in eighth place at the Grand Prix de France after placing eighth in both the short program and free skate.

He was forced to sit out the rest of the season due to a foot injury.

=== 2023–24 season ===
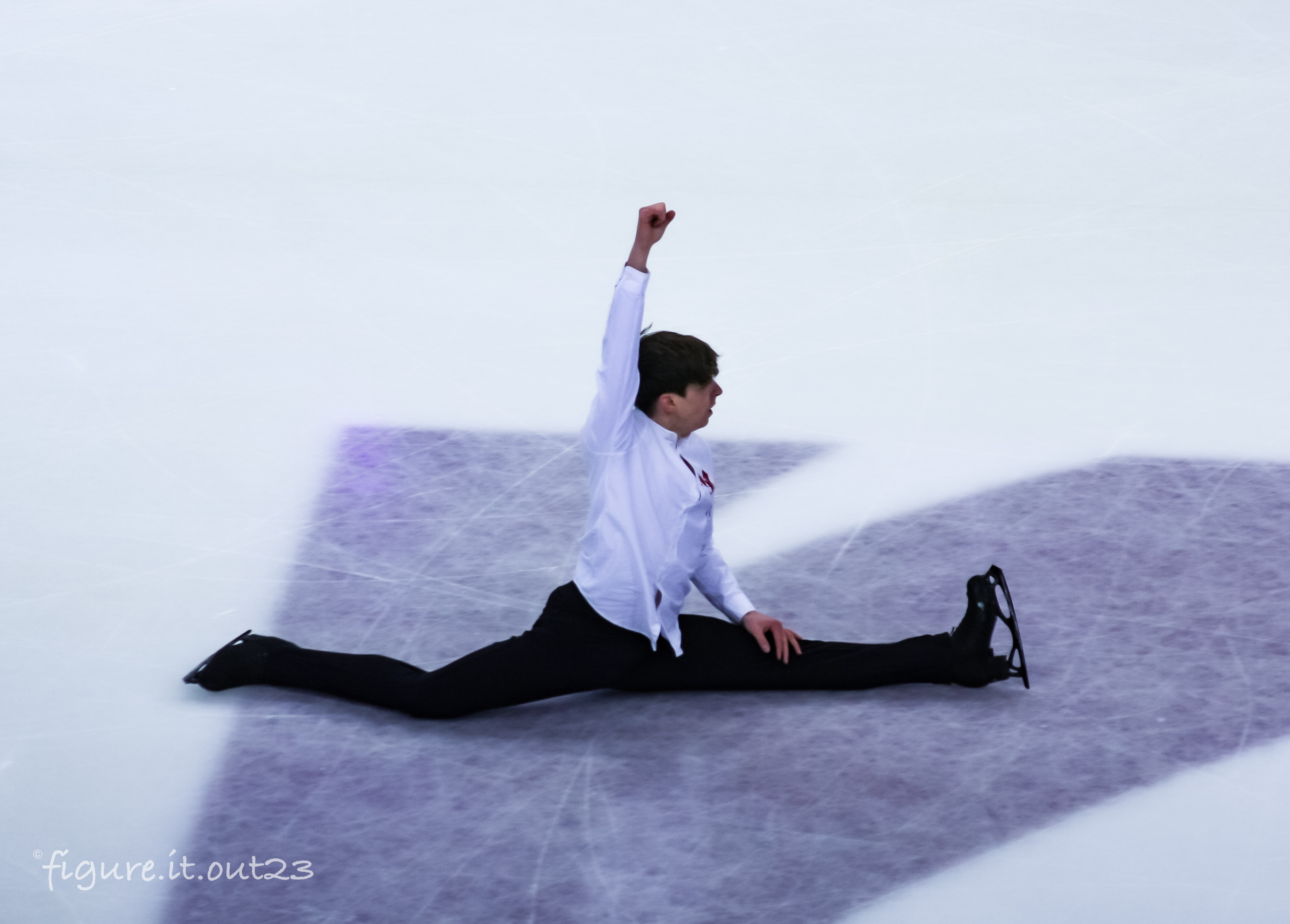
Shmuratko performing his signature split at the 2024 European Championships

Shmuratko opted to return to train in Ukraine, explaining that "it‘s my home." He designed both of his programs to reflect the realities of the ongoing war, and said "it's one of my missions coming out of Ukraine to tell the stories through my art and my voice. It's my way to fight for my country." Shmuratko's short program presented a story of a child killed by a missile and the child's father being forced to live with it, and his free skate presented a continuation of that story.

In his competitive debut for the season, he finished eighth at the 2023 Nepela Memorial. He was invited to appear on the Grand Prix at the 2023 Grand Prix of Espoo, coming eighth.

At the 2024 European Championships in Kaunas, Lithuania, Shmuratko placed nineteenth in the short program, but twelfth in the free skate, moving up to fourteenth-place overall. During his free skate, Shmuratko notably wore a white shirt with a red splotch spattered across his chest to signify blood stains. Following the event, he said, "This is the astral between life and death. No more, and no less. It is incomparably more than words can convey. The element with blood? Because that's how it is, literally. People die from missiles like this, with blood."

Competing at the 2024 World Championships in Montreal, Quebec, Canada, Shmuratko would finish thirty-third. He would go on to compete at the 2024 Ukrainian Championships one month later and win the silver medal behind Kyrylo Marsak.

=== 2024–25 season: Challenger Series bronze ===
Shmuratko began the season by competing on the 2024–25 ISU Challenger Series, finishing fifth at the 2024 CS Trophée Métropole Nice Côte d'Azur, seventh at the 2024 CS Tallinn Trophy, and taking bronze at the 2024 CS Warsaw Cup.

He closed the season with a sixteenth-place finish at the 2025 European Championships in Tallinn, Estonia.

== Programs ==
Season	Short program	Free skating	Exhibition
2025–2026	White Flowers Take Their Bath by Mari Samuelsen, Meredi, Scoring Berlin, & Jonathan Stockhammer choreo. by Mykhailo Leiba, Ivan Shmuratko	Cinema Paradiso by Ennio Morricone choreo. by Ivan Shmuratko; Summer 3; Summer 1 by Antonio Vivaldi performed by Max Richter; Get Up Offa That Thing by James Brown choreo. by Mykhailo Leiba, Ivan Shmuratko	
2024–2025	Ne me quitte pas by Jacques Brel choreo. by Mykhailo Leiba, Ivan Shmuratko; White Flowers Take Their Bath by Mari Samuelsen, Meredi, Scoring Berlin, & Jonathan Stockhammer choreo. by Mykhailo Leiba, Ivan Shmuratko	Summer 3; Summer 1 by Antonio Vivaldi performed by Max Richter; Get Up Offa That Thing by James Brown choreo. by Mykhailo Leiba, Ivan Shmuratko	
2023–2024	Melody from The High Pass by Daniel Hope, Alexey Botvinov, and Myroslav Skoryk choreo. by Mykhailo Leiba, Ivan Shmuratko	Walk by Ludovico Einaudi; This Place Was A Shelter by Ólafur Arnalds choreo. by Mykhailo Leiba, Ivan Shmuratko, Adam Solya; Скрипка Грає (The Violin Plays) by Vasily Zinkevich choreo. by Ivan Shmuratko	
2022–2023	Біля Тополі (Near the Poplar) by Oleg Shumei choreo. by Alexey Oleynik	Find Me by Forest Blakk; On the Nature of Daylight by Max Richter; This Place Was A Shelter by Ólafur Arnalds choreo. by Adam Solya	Пісня про рушник (Dearest Mother of Mine) performed by Dmytro Hnatyuk
2021–2022	Une vie d'amour by Charles Aznavour choreo. by Dmitri Dmitrenko	Nuvole bianche by Ludovico Einaudi choreo. by Oleksii Oliinyk	
2020–2021	Une vie d'amour by Charles Aznavour choreo. by Dmitri Dmitrenko	Cornerstone by Benjamin Clementine choreo. by Dmitri Dmitrenko	
2019–2020	What a Wonderful World by Louis Armstrong choreo. by Dmitri Dmitrenko	Cornerstone by Benjamin Clementine choreo. by Dmitri Dmitrenko	
2018–2019	Domani performed by Andrea Bocelli	Luna performed by Alessandro Safina	
2017–2018	Domani performed by Andrea Bocelli	Wheel of Fortune (from Pirates of the Caribbean: Dead Man's Chest) by Hans Zimmer	
2016–2017	Buona Sera, 1956 by Louis Prima	Wheel of Fortune (from Pirates of the Caribbean: Dead Man's Chest) by Hans Zimmer	
2015–2016	Remembrances (from Schindler's List) by John Williams	Overture (from The Adventures of Sherlock Holmes and Dr. Watson) by Vladimir Dashkevich	

== Competitive highlights ==
- GP – Event of the ISU Grand Prix Series
- JGP – Event of the ISU Junior Grand Prix Series
- CS – Event of the ISU Challenger Series
- C – Event was cancelled

Competition placements at senior level
Season	2018–19	2019–20	2020–21	2021–22	2022–23	2023–24	2024–25	2025–26
Winter Olympics				24th				
World Championships	29th	C	21st	23rd		33rd		
European Championships	22nd			12th		14th	16th	
Ukrainian Championships	1st	1st	1st	1st		2nd		2nd
GP Finland						8th		
GP France					8th			
CS Budapest Trophy			6th	4th				
CS Denis Ten Memorial				5th				
CS Finlandia Trophy					6th			
CS Golden Spin of Zagreb								8th
CS Lombardia Trophy								13th
CS Nebelhorn Trophy			12th		7th			
CS Nepela Memorial						8th		
CS Tallinn Trophy							7th	
CS Trophée Métropole Nice							5th	
CS Warsaw Cup				17th	12th		3rd	5th
Bosphorus Cup	2nd							
Halloween Cup		2nd						
Volvo Open Cup	3rd							4th

Competition placements at junior level
Season	2014–15	2015–16	2016–17	2017–18	2018–19	2019–20
World Junior Championships				28th	16th	15th
Winter Youth Olympics		14th				
Winter Youth Olympics (Team event)		2nd				
Ukrainian Championships (Senior)		4th	3rd	3rd		
Ukrainian Championships (Junior)	3rd	4th	3rd			
JGP Armenia					7th	
JGP Austria				15th		
JGP Italy						3rd
JGP Lithuania					10th	
JGP Poland				15th		7th
Ice Star		1st				
Santa Claus Cup		2nd		1st		

== Detailed results ==
ISU personal best scores in the +5/-5 GOE System
Segment	Type	Score	Event
Total	TSS	221.44	2019 JGP Italy
Short program	TSS	82.13	2022 European Championships
Short program	TES	44.06	2022 European Championships
Short program	PCS	38.07	2022 European Championships
Free skating	TSS	146.18	2019 JGP Italy
Free skating	TES	73.70	2019 JGP Italy
Free skating	PCS	75.92	2022 CS Finlandia Trophy

=== Senior level ===
Results in the 2015–16 season
Date	Event	SP		FS		Total	
Date	Event	P	Score	P	Score	P	Score
Jan 19–21, 2016	(Ukraine) 2016 Ukrainian Championships	4	53.83	4	90.91	4	144.74

Results in the 2016–17 season
Date	Event	SP		FS		Total	
Date	Event	P	Score	P	Score	P	Score
Dec 20–23, 2016	(Ukraine) 2017 Ukrainian Championships	3	57.40	3	117.08	3	174.48

Results in the 2017–18 season
Date	Event	SP		FS		Total	
Date	Event	P	Score	P	Score	P	Score
Dec 17–20, 2017	(Ukraine) 2018 Ukrainian Championships	3	61.86	3	120.50	3	182.36

Results in the 2018–19 season
Date	Event	SP		FS		Total	
Date	Event	P	Score	P	Score	P	Score
Nov 6–11, 2018	(Latvia) 2018 Volvo Open Cup	1	76.48	7	122.91	3	199.39
Nov 27 – Dec 1, 2018	(Turkey) 2018 Bosphorus Cup	2	73.18	3	135.47	2	208.65
Dec 17–20, 2018	(Ukraine) 2019 Ukrainian Championships	1	59.75	1	126.37	1	186.12
Jan 21–27, 2019	(Belarus) 2019 European Championships	19	67.26	24	111.03	22	178.29
Mar 18–24, 2019	(Japan) 2019 World Championships	29	62.99	—N/a	—N/a	29	62.99

Results in the 2019–20 season
Date	Event	SP		FS		Total	
Date	Event	P	Score	P	Score	P	Score
Oct 17–19, 2019	(Hungary) 2019 Halloween Cup	3	73.33	2	133.52	2	206.85
Dec 18–21, 2019	(Ukraine) 2020 Ukrainian Championships	1	76.69	1	145.63	1	222.42

Results in the 2020–21 season
Date	Event	SP		FS		Total	
Date	Event	P	Score	P	Score	P	Score
Sep 23–26, 2020	(Germany) 2020 CS Nebelhorn Trophy	9	69.42	13	109.96	12	179.38
Oct 14–17, 2020	(Hungary) 2020 CS Budapest Trophy	6	60.14	3	140.60	6	200.74
Feb 22–24, 2021	(Ukraine) 2021 Ukrainian Championships	1	79.17	1	145.64	1	224.81
Mar 22–28, 2021	(Sweden) 2021 World Championships	22	73.98	20	130.19	21	204.17

Results in the 2021–22 season
Date	Event	SP		FS		Total	
Date	Event	P	Score	P	Score	P	Score
Oct 14–17, 2021	(Hungary) 2021 Budapest Trophy	2	73.22	4	150.07	4	223.29
Oct 28–31, 2021	(Kazakhstan) 2021 CS Denis Ten Memorial Challenge	4	76.94	6	131.72	5	208.66
Nov 17–20, 2021	(Poland) 2021 CS Warsaw Cup	20	64.27	17	126.56	17	190.83
Dec 7–8, 2021	(Ukraine) 2022 Ukrainian Championships	1	82.18	1	147.07	1	229.25
Jan 10–16, 2022	(Estonia) 2022 European Championships	8	82.13	15	132.44	12	214.57
Feb 4–20, 2022	(China) 2022 Winter Olympics	22	78.11	24	127.65	24	205.76
Mar 21–27, 2022	(France) 2022 World Championships	22	73.99	23	122.66	23	196.65

Results in the 2022–23 season
Date	Event	SP		FS		Total	
Date	Event	P	Score	P	Score	P	Score
Sep 21–24, 2022	(Germany) 2022 CS Nebelhorn Trophy	6	69.89	8	125.01	7	194.90
Oct 4–9, 2022	(Finland) 2022 CS Finlandia Trophy	5	72.18	5	144.07	6	216.25
Nov 4–6, 2022	2022 Grand Prix de France	8	75.95	8	144.13	8	220.08
Nov 17–20, 2022	(Poland) 2022 CS Warsaw Cup	7	74.41	16	125.24	12	199.65

Results in the 2023–24 season
Date	Event	SP		FS		Total	
Date	Event	P	Score	P	Score	P	Score
Sep 28–30, 2023	(Slovakia) 2023 CS Nepela Memorial	10	72.14	6	143.54	8	215.68
Nov 17–19, 2023	(Finland) 2023 Grand Prix of Espoo	10	66.30	7	134.37	8	200.67
Jan 10–14, 2024	(Lithuania) 2024 European Championships	19	69.95	12	140.70	14	210.65
Mar 18–24, 2024	(Canada) 2024 World Championships	33	66.90	—N/a	—N/a	33	66.90

Results in the 2024–25 season
Date	Event	SP		FS		Total	
Date	Event	P	Score	P	Score	P	Score
Oct 16–20, 2024	(France) 2024 CS Trophée Métropole Nice Côte d'Azur	7	74.61	5	143.58	5	218.19
Nov 11-17, 2024	(Estonia) 2024 CS Tallinn Trophy	3	76.57	10	129.67	7	206.24
Nov 20–24, 2024	(Poland) 2024 CS Warsaw Cup	3	78.28	5	137.46	3	215.74
Jan 28 – Feb 2, 2025	(Estonia) 2025 European Championships	17	71.53	17	130.36	16	201.89

Results in the 2025–26 season
Date	Event	SP		FS		Total	
Date	Event	P	Score	P	Score	P	Score
Sep 11–14, 2025	(Italy) 2025 CS Lombardia Trophy	13	66.26	13	117.22	13	183.48
Nov 5-9, 2025	(Latvia) 2025 Volvo Open Cup	4	73.37	4	114.93	4	188.30
Nov 19–23, 2025	(Poland) 2025 CS Warsaw Cup	3	76.44	12	125.32	5	201.76
Dec 3–6, 2025	(Croatia) 2025 CS Golden Spin of Zagreb	6	77.36	10	131.71	8	209.07
Apr 8–11, 2026	(Ukraine) 2026 Ukrainian Championships	1	60.81	2	119.49	2	180.30

=== Junior level ===
Results in the 2014–15 season
Date	Event	SP		FS		Total	
Date	Event	P	Score	P	Score	P	Score
Feb 12–14, 2015	(Ukraine) 2015 Ukrainian Championships (Junior)	5	44.88	3	91.94	3	136.82

Results in the 2015–16 season
Date	Event	SP		FS		Total	
Date	Event	P	Score	P	Score	P	Score
Oct 8–10, 2015	(Belarus) 2015 Ice Star	1	56.98	1	107.17	1	164.15
Nov 28 – Dec 4, 2015	(Hungary) 2015 Santa Claus Cup	6	43.85	2	97.27	2	141.12
Jan 19–21, 2016	(Ukraine) 2016 Ukrainian Championships (Junior)	5	44.97	4	98.56	4	143.53
Feb 12–21, 2016	(Norway) 2016 Winter Youth Olympics	14	42.39	14	83.39	14	125.78
Feb 12–21, 2016	(Norway) 2016 Winter Youth Olympics (Team event)	—N/a	—N/a	6	89.66	2	—N/a

Results in the 2016–17 season
Date	Event	SP		FS		Total	
Date	Event	P	Score	P	Score	P	Score
Dec 20–23, 2016	(Ukraine) 2017 Ukrainian Championships (Junior)	3	52.93	3	110.77	3	163.70

Results in the 2017–18 season
Date	Event	SP		FS		Total	
Date	Event	P	Score	P	Score	P	Score
Aug 30 – Sep 2, 2017	2017 JGP Austria	15	53.38	15	99.31	15	152.69
Oct 4–7, 2017	2017 JGP Poland	11	60.30	17	96.31	15	156.61
Dec 4–10, 2017	(Hungary) 2017 Santa Claus Cup	1	60.49	2	113.34	1	173.83
Mar 5–11, 2017	(Bulgaria) 2018 World Junior Championships	28	54.51	—N/a	—N/a	28	54.51

Results in the 2018–19 season
Date	Event	SP		FS		Total	
Date	Event	P	Score	P	Score	P	Score
Sep 5–8, 2018	2018 JGP Lithuania	10	54.63	8	103.49	10	158.12
Oct 10–13, 2018	2018 JGP Armenia	1	72.08	8	108.93	7	181.01
Mar 4–10, 2019	(Croatia) 2019 World Junior Championships	13	73.31	17	118.01	16	191.32

Results in the 2019–20 season
Date	Event	SP		FS		Total	
Date	Event	P	Score	P	Score	P	Score
Sep 18–21, 2019	2019 JGP Poland	7	70.13	7	131.77	7	201.90
Oct 2–5, 2019	2019 JGP Italy	3	75.26	3	146.18	3	221.44
Mar 2–8, 2020	(Estonia) 2020 World Junior Championships	16	68.76	9	128.64	15	197.40
