= Kimmy Repond =

Swiss figure skater (born 2006)

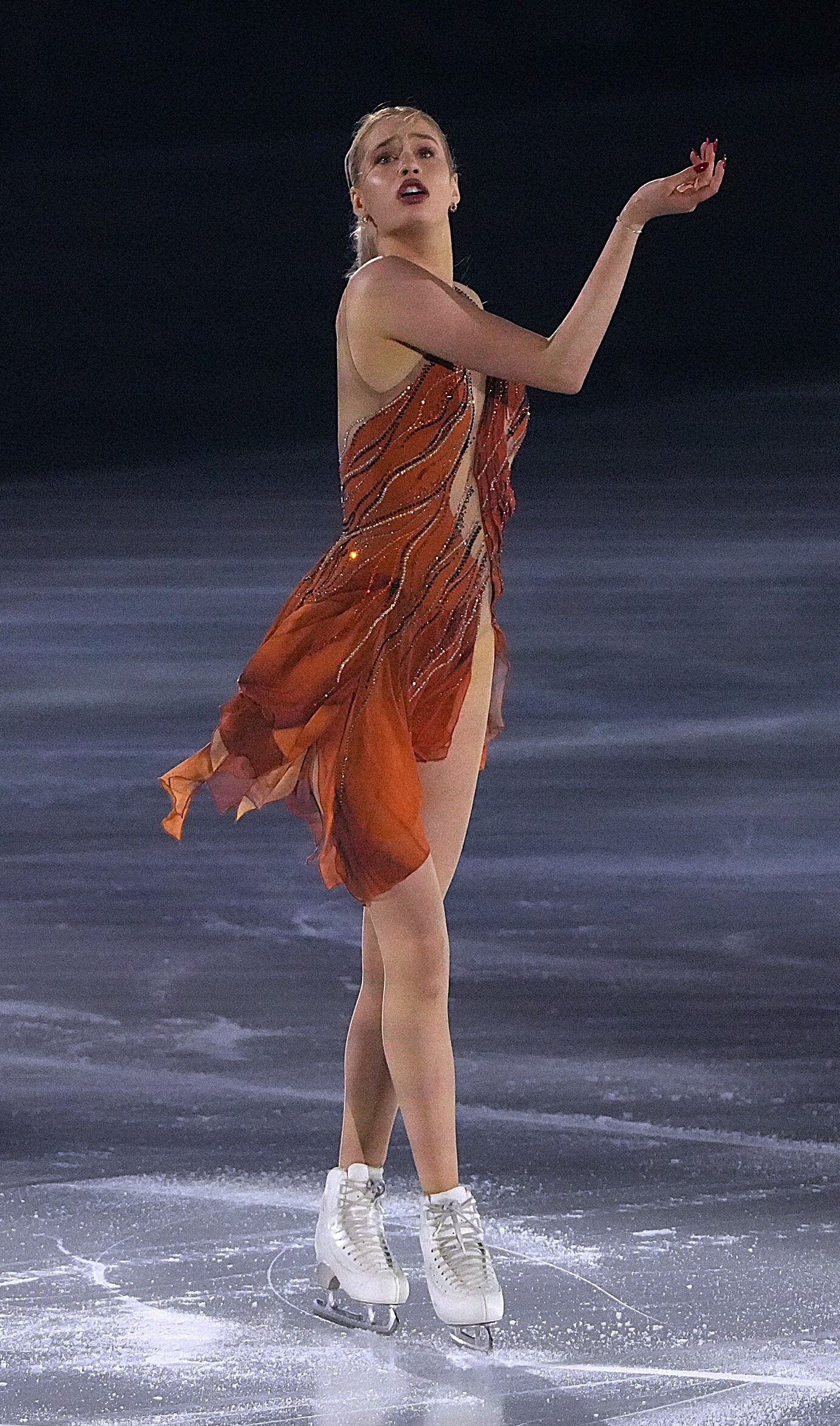
- Kimmy Repond performing at 2026 Art on Ice

Personal information
- Full name: Kimmy Vivienne Repond
- Born: 18 October 2006 (age 20) Basel, Switzerland
- Home town: Basel
- Height: 1.77 m (5 ft 10 in)

Figure skating career
- Country: Switzerland
- Discipline: Women's singles
- Coach: Luca Demattè
- Skating club: ECB Basel

Medal record
European Championships
Bronze medal – third place	2023 Espoo	Singles
Swiss Championships
Gold medal – first place	2024 Küsnacht	Singles
Gold medal – first place	2025 Geneva	Singles
Silver medal – second place	2023 Chur	Singles

Kimmy Vivienne Repond (born 18 October 2006) is a Swiss figure skater. She is the 2023 European bronze medalist, a four-time ISU Challenger Series medalist, and a two-time Swiss national champion.

Repond finished seventh at both the 2022 and 2023 World Junior Championships, and is a two-time (2020, 2022) Swiss junior national champion.

Repond represented Switzerland at the 2026 Winter Olympics.

== Personal life ==
Repond was born on 18 October 2006 in Basel, Switzerland, to father René, a management consultant, and mother Claudia, a lawyer. She has three sisters – Sidonie, Jérômie, and Caline – all of whom have competed in figure skating. She plans to pursue a career in medicine once she retires from competitive skating. Repond attended a British school in Switzerland, which she graduated from in 2023, and speaks fluent German and English.

In May 2026, Repond confirmed that she was in a relationship with French skater, Adam Siao Him Fa.

== Career ==
=== 2021–2022 season: International junior debut ===
Repond made her international and ISU Junior Grand Prix debut at the 2021 JGP Slovakia in September, coached by her older sister Jérômie. She finished eighth in both segments to place eighth overall and did not receive a second assignment. She competed at three more international junior B events in the fall, taking the title at both the 2021 Trophée Métropole Nice and the 2021 NRW Trophy, and placing second at the 2021 Santa Claus Cup behind Nina Pinzarrone of Belgium.

Repond claimed her second Swiss junior national title in late January 2022 by a 27-point margin over second-place finisher Sarina Joos and was later assigned to the Swiss women's berth at the 2022 World Junior Championships. At Junior Worlds, held in Tallinn, Estonia, in April, Repond placed eighth in the short program and seventh in the free skate to finish seventh overall. She was the highest-finishing European junior woman in the event.

=== 2022–2023 season: International senior debut and European bronze ===
Repond opened her season in early September at the 2022 JGP Austria, where she placed fourth in the short program. She dropped to sixth in the free skate to finish sixth overall. At her second JGP assignment, the 2022 JGP Poland I, one of two events held in Gdańsk, Repond placed seventh in the short program. However, with a clean skate and a new personal best in the free program, she climbed in the standings to fourth place in the segment and fourth overall, her best finish at a JGP event to date.

In October, Repond competed at her first senior international event, the 2022 CS Budapest Trophy. She won the short program with a new personal best score but fell to third place in the free skate to ultimately finish second overall between American gold medalist Ava Marie Ziegler and Estonian bronze medalist Niina Petrõkina. Notably, Repond led domestic rival Alexia Paganini by over six points after the short program, but Paganini later withdrew before the free.

Repond competed at a second Challenger Series assignment, the 2022 CS Ice Challenge held in Graz, Austria in November. Doctors discovered a partial fracture in her foot days before the competition but she still decided to skate to qualify for the European Championships. She placed ninth in the short program after falling on a planned triple Lutz but rose to second in the free skate to place third overall behind Italian Anna Pezzetta and Canada's Kaiya Ruiter. After the competition, she took a 3-week break to let her foot heal. Due to this, she missed two international competitions.

Repond competed at her first senior Swiss Figure Skating Championships in mid-December. With reigning national champion Alexia Paganini absent, Repond was heavily favored to win the title. However, she got back on the ice just two weeks before nationals and placed third in the short program and first in the free skate to narrowly finish in second place behind Livia Kaiser. Repond was later named to the Swiss team for the 2023 European Championships alongside Kaiser.

At the European Championships, held in Espoo, Finland, in late January, Repond placed third in the short program despite a quarter call on her triple Lutz jump, behind Georgian segment leader Anastasiia Gubanova and pre-event favourite Loena Hendrickx of Belgium. She noted that having "been dreaming about going" to the European championships, she had "tried not to have any expectations," which mean that "third place is a really big thing for me, and I am really happy." She was second in the free skate after Hendrickx fell twice, remaining third overall by a margin of only 0.97 points and winning the bronze medal. Her placement marked the first podium finish for a Swiss women's singles skater at the European Championships since Sarah Meier won the title in 2011.

Repond was next assigned to the 2023 World Junior Championships in Calgary, Alberta, Canada, where she aimed to finish in the top eight and thereby qualify a Swiss berth at the 2024 Winter Youth Olympics. Tenth in the short program with underrotation calls on her jumps, she rallied in the free skate and rose to seventh overall. Repond ultimately finished eighth at her first senior World Championships.

=== 2023–2024 season: First National title ===
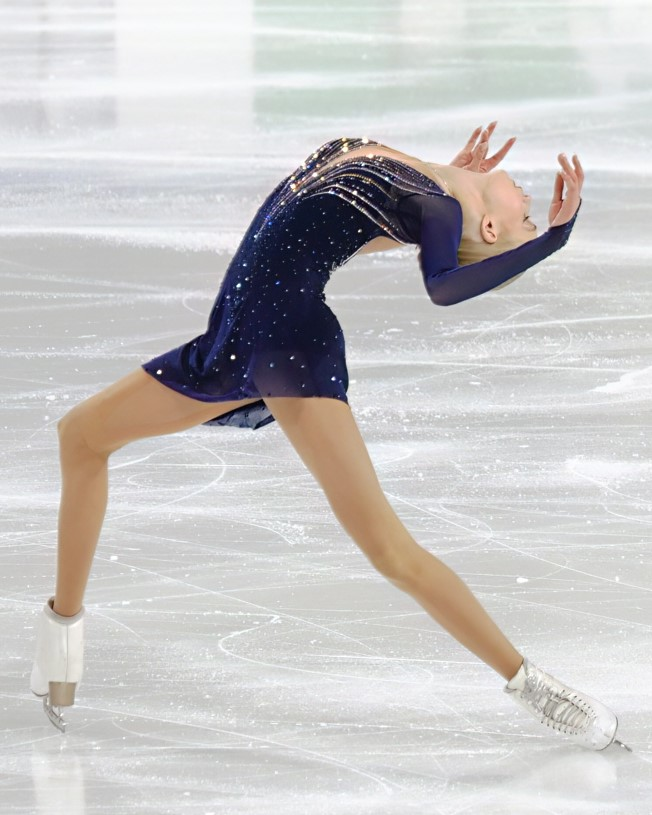
Repond performing an Ina Bauer during her free skate at the 2023 Grand Prix de France

Repond began her second senior season at the 2023 CS Nebelhorn Trophy in September. She placed third in the short program despite a fall on her solo triple lutz, and later rose to first in the free skate to finish second overall behind Isabeau Levito. Following this, she was invited to participate in the 2023 Japan Open as part of Team Europe. She finished fifth of six women in the free skate, while the team won the bronze medal.

Repond made her Grand Prix debut at the 2023 Grand Prix de France, held in Angers in early November. She struggled at the event, falling on both her solo triple flip and her triple Lutz-triple toe loop combination in the short program, and making another series of jump errors in the free skate, leading to a tenth-place finish overall. The skater later revealed that she'd been contending with an injury she sustained at the Nebelhorn Trophy in September and that she would not compete at her second Grand Prix assignment, the 2023 Grand Prix of Espoo, opting to instead take time to heal in anticipation of the championship events in the new year.

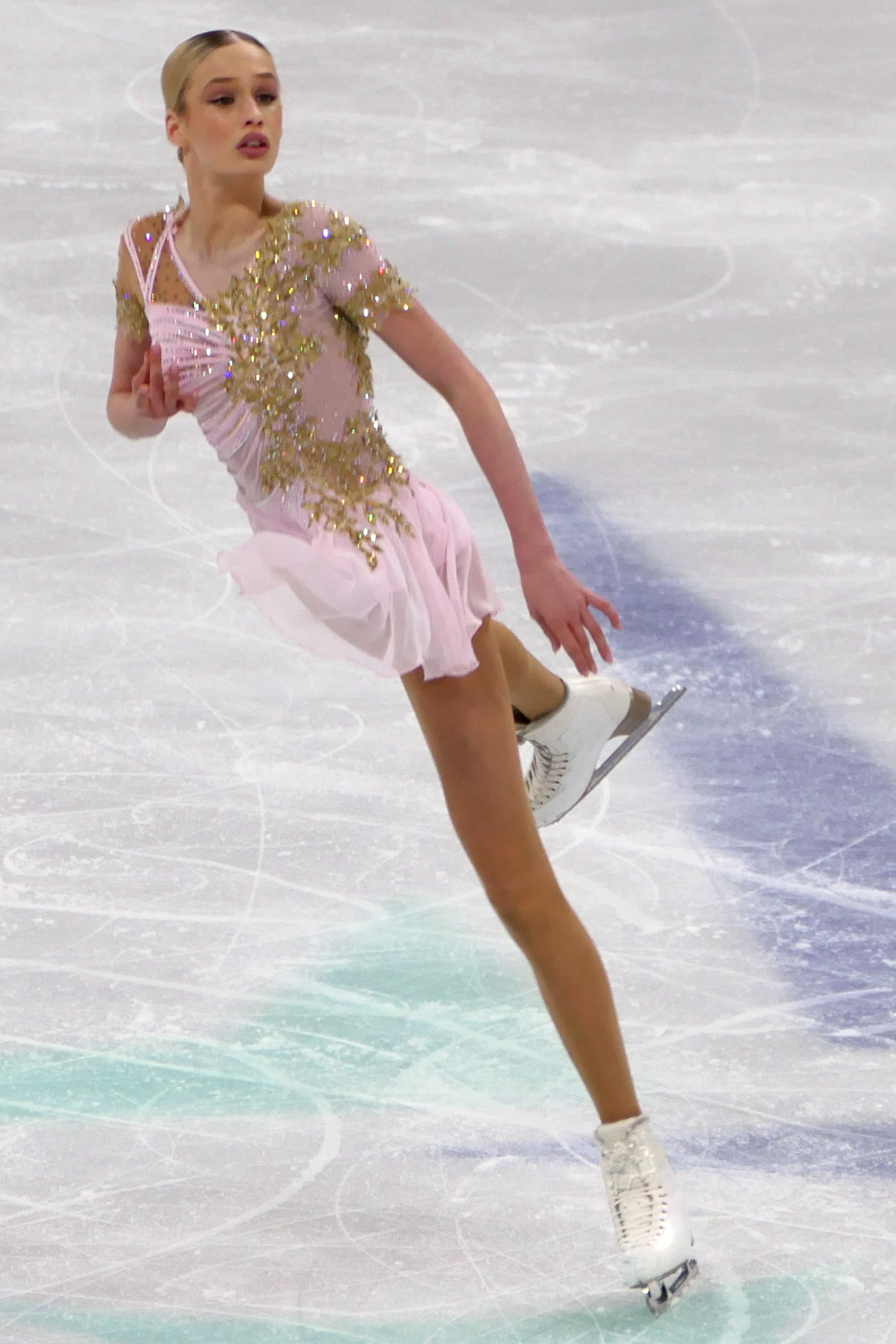
Repond during her short program at the 2024 World Championships

At the 2024 Swiss Championships, Repond captured the Swiss title for the first time. She finished seventh at the 2024 European Championships, and said afterward she felt "a bit disappointed," speculating that she had nerve issues due to limited training time while recovering from her hip problem.

Repond finished the season at the 2024 World Championships in Montreal, Quebec, Canada. In the short program, she came twelfth in the segment after falling on a triple Lutz jump. She rebounded in the free skate, coming fourth in that segment with a personal best 133.38 point score. This lifted her to fifth overall. Repond expressed enthusiasm at her results, saying: "Finally, I could show what I am capable of. Except for the mistake yesterday, I had a good competition I am really happy with."

In June, Repond announced that she had relocated to Oberstdorf, Germany to train under Michael Huth while simultaneously continuing to be coached by her sister, Jérômie, in Basel.

=== 2024–2025 season ===
Repond started the season by competing on the 2024–25 ISU Challenger Series, finishing sixth at the 2024 CS Nebelhorn Trophy and winning silver at the 2024 CS Budapest Trophy. Going on to compete on the 2024–25 Grand Prix circuit, Repond would place third in the short program at 2024 Skate Canada International but fifth in the free skate, falling to fourth place overall. Due to the event being a close competition, Repond finished only 0.30 points behind bronze medalist Hana Yoshida. Following the competition, Repond said she was overall "still really happy with what I did at this competition. And we did two good performances. One was perfect and one was okay. But it was also pretty good. But, you know, I wanted to medal, so I'm a little bit disappointed being third after the short program."

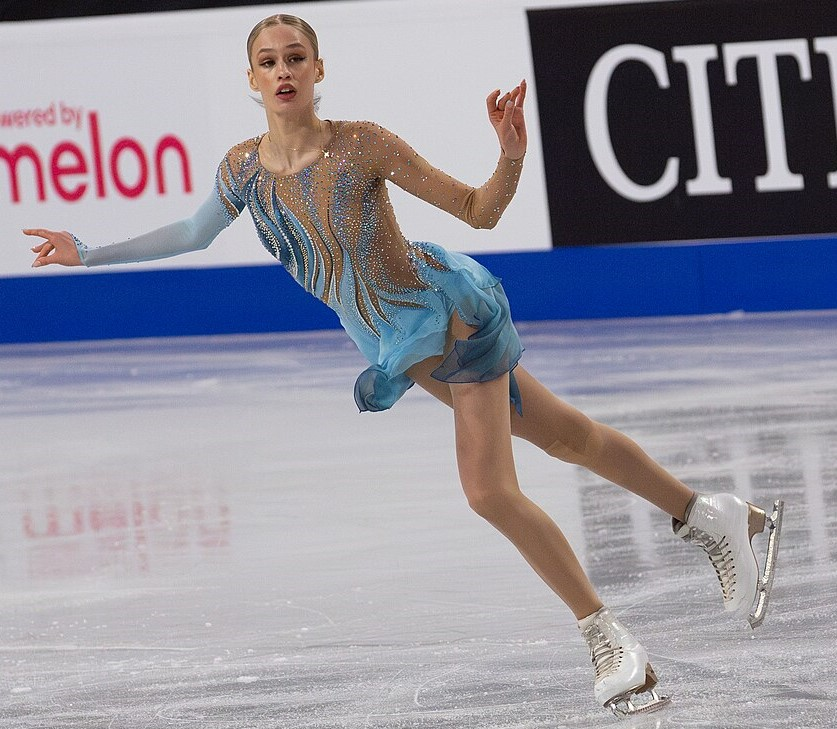
Repond performing her short program at 2024 Skate Canada International

Shortly before her second Grand Prix event, the 2024 Cup of China, one of Repond's skating boots broke, though she was able to compete by taping it. She was sixth in the short program and fifth in the free skate and finished in sixth place overall. Repond said that she was "really happy with how I did today, but I know I can do a bit better".

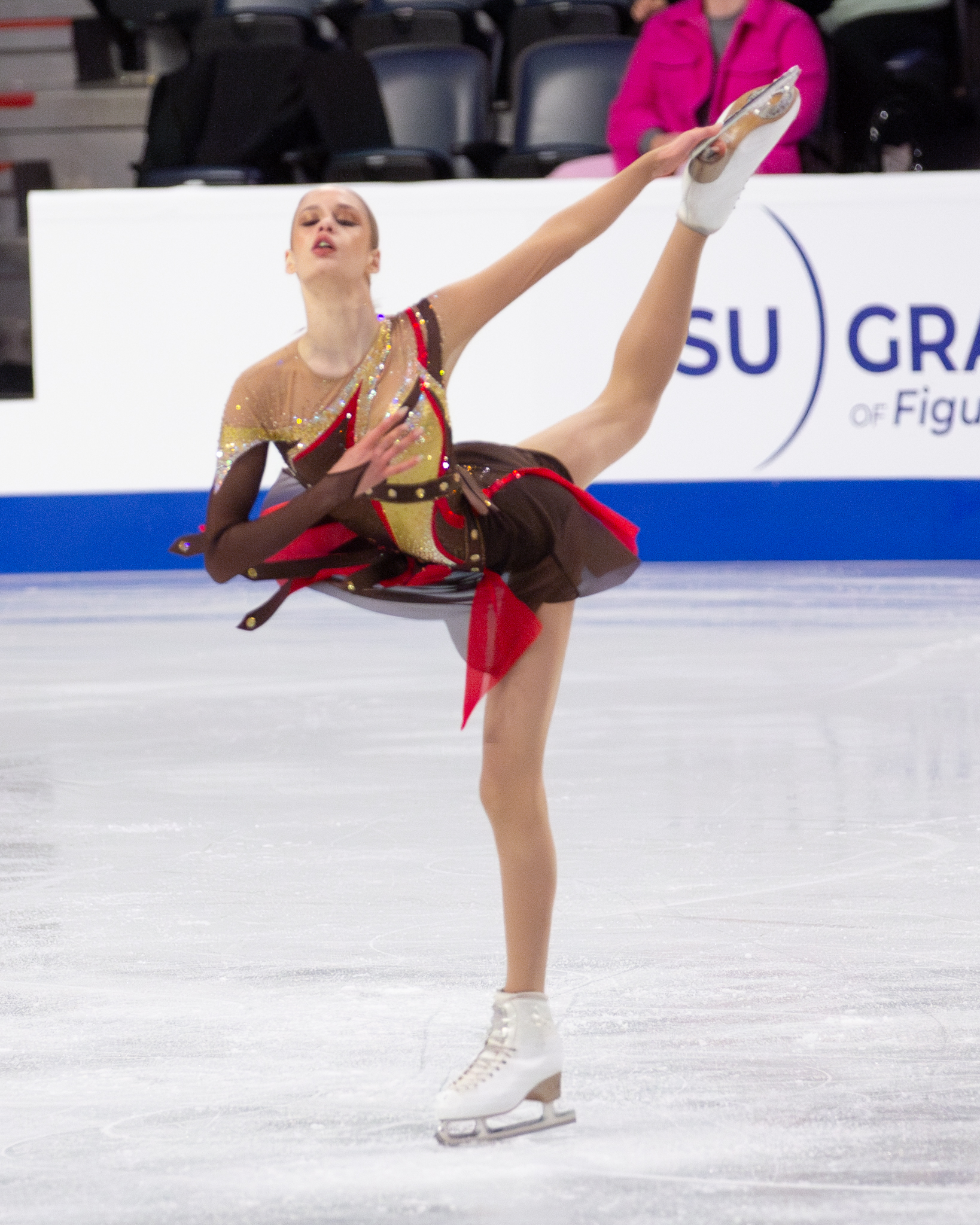
Repond performing a catch-foot camel spin during her free skate at 2024 Skate Canada International

In mid-December, Repond would win her second national title at the 2025 Swiss Championships. The following month, she competed at the 2025 European Championships in Tallinn, Estonia, Repond placed third in the short program, winning a small bronze medal. Before the free skate, however, she fell ill which impacted her performance, where she fell twice, placing fifth in that segment and dropping to fourth place overall. “I feel a little bit sad and disappointed because obviously, I wanted more,” said Repond after the free skate. “I can't really explain the mistake on the loop, but I do understand the mistake on the flip. After the loop-Axle, I just felt very tired, and I think that probably comes from being ill and not being back to my full strength.

She subsequently closed the season by finishing twelfth at the 2025 World Championships in Boston, Massachusetts, United States. This placement, in addition to Livia Kaiser's twenty-third place finish, won Switzerland two quotas for women's singles skating at the 2026 Winter Olympics. “I'm a little bit disappointed,” admitted Repond. “I'm very relieved that I stayed in 12th and secured the two spots for the Olympics next season. It's going to be an important one.”

=== 2025–2026 season: Milano Cortina Olympics ===
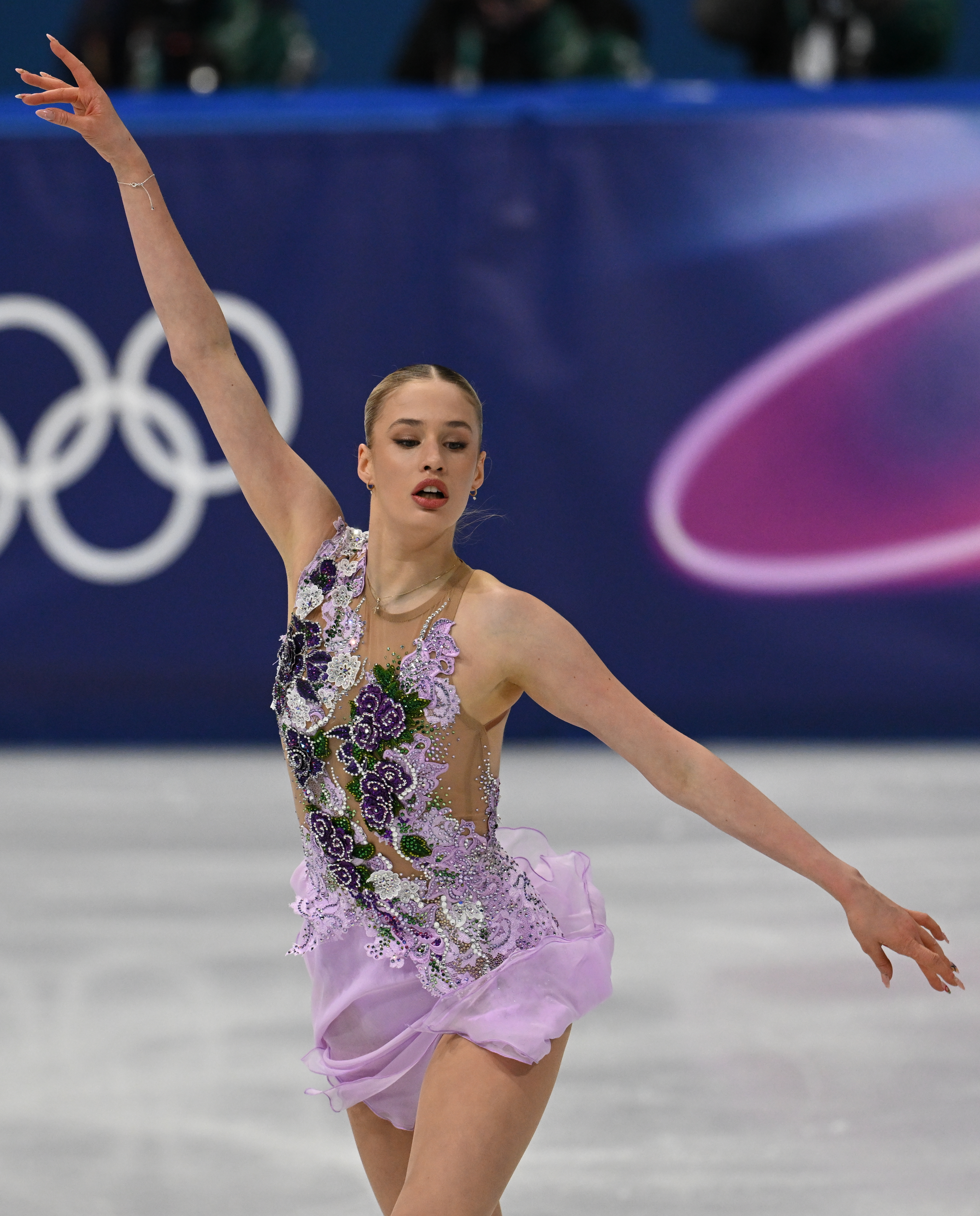
Repond during her free skate at the 2026 Winter Olympics

Although assigned to compete at the 2025 Cup of China and the 2025 NHK Trophy, Repond opted to withdraw from both events due to a foot injury she sustained as early as January. She subsequently also withdrew from her two Challenger Series assignments, the 2025 CS Warsaw Cup and 2025 CS Tallinn Trophy, set to take place in late fall.

In December, Repond began training again after over half a year without being able to do so. The following month, she made her official return to competition at the 2026 European Championships in Sheffield, England, United Kingdom, where she finished in seventh place overall. In an interview following her free skate, she said, "I was getting very tired, but for me personally, it was so challenging the past eight months, so it’s a big personal victory for me. It means a lot to be back and doing a pretty good free skate, and also making the top 10." Following the event, Repond was named to the 2026 Winter Olympic team.

In February, Kimmy competed at the 2026 Winter Olympics. She placed twenty-first in the short program, qualifying for the free skate segment. Two days later, she placed twenty-third in the free skate to finish in twenty-third place overall. She subsequently withdrew from the 2026 World Championships due to an ongoing foot injury.

Following the season, Repond and her sister, Jérômie Repond, mutually ended their ten-year coach and student relationship due to Jérômie opting to pursue a career in psychotherapy full-time. It was subsequently announced that Jérômie's boyfriend, Luca Demattè, would take over coaching Repond and her younger sister, Caline, in Basel.

== Programs ==
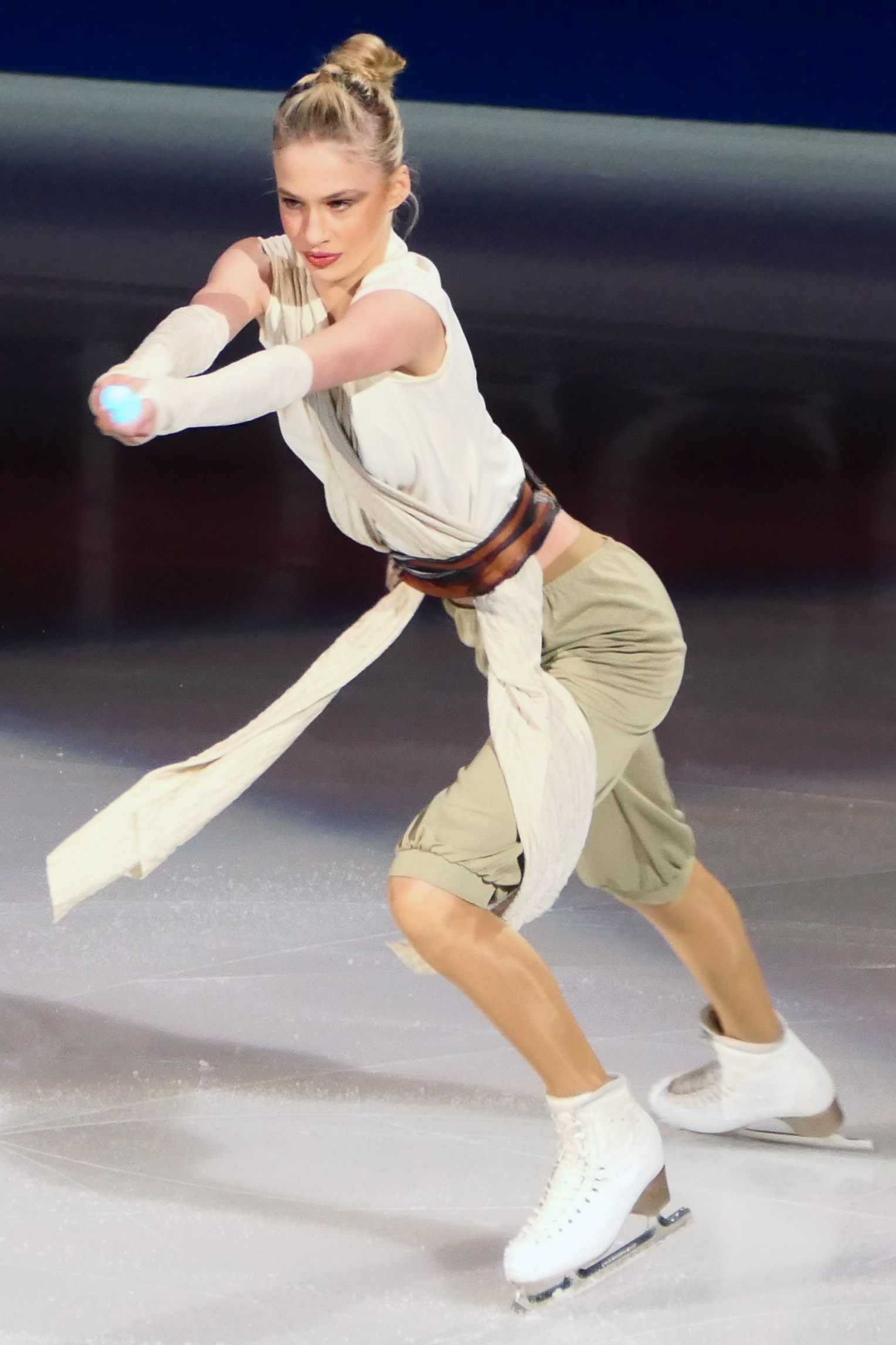
Repond during her exhibition program at the 2024 World Championships

Season	Short program	Free skating	Exhibition
2026–2027	Caravanserai (Instrumental) by Karunesh; Isa by Wardruna all arranged by Karl Hugo choreo. by David Wilson	S.O.S. d'un terrien en detresse by Dimash Qudaibergen, Michel Berger choreo. by David Wilson	
2025–2026	Caravanserai (Instrumental) by Karunesh; Isa by Wardruna all arranged by Karl Hugo choreo. by David Wilson	White Flowers Take Their Bath by Mari Samuelsen, Meredi, Scoring Berlin, & Jonathan Stockhammer; Nevertheless She Persisted by Audiomachine & Samuel Karl Bohn choreo. by David Wilson	Wildflower; Happier Than Ever by Billie Eilish
2024–2025	Mother Nature (from Planet Earth III) by Hans Zimmer & Raye choreo. by David Wilson	Gladiator; The Wheat; Gladiator Suite: Part 1; Gladiator Suite: Part 3; Now We Are Free by Hans Zimmer & Lisa Gerrard arranged by Karl Hugo choreo. by David Wilson	Skinny Love by Bon Iver performed by Birdy; Teardrop by Patrizio Ratto; In Your Eyes by Kylie Minogue choreo. by David Wilson; Pon de Replay; Breakin' Dishes; S&M by Rihanna choreo. by David Vincour
2023–2024	Voilà by Barbara Pravi choreo. by David Wilson	Freya by Christian Reindl & Lucie Paradis; Dawn of Faith by Eternal Eclipse choreo. by David Wilson	Star Wars; Super Extra Deluxe Credits Suite by John Powell & John Williams; Good Thing You Were Listening by John Powell; Duel of the Fates (Epic Version) by Samuel Kim choreo. by Ivan Righini
2022–2023	Love is a Bitch; Go F**k Yourself by Two Feet arranged by Hugo Chouinard choreo. by David Vincour	Exogenesis: Symphony Part 3: Redemption by Muse choreo. by David Vincour	Wednesday: Paint It Black by The Rolling Stones; Goo Goo Muck by The Cramps; Joke's on You (from Birds of Prey) by Charlotte Lawrence
2021–2022	Run by Ludovico Einaudi choreo. by David Vincour	Exogenesis: Symphony Part 3: Redemption by Muse choreo. by David Vincour	Ocean Eyes by Billie Eilish

== Competitive highlights ==
- GP – Event of the ISU Grand Prix Series
- JGP – Event of the ISU Junior Grand Prix Series
- CS – Event of the ISU Challenger Series
- TBD – Assigned
- WD – Withdrew from competition
- Medals at team events are awarded for the team results only. Individual placements at team events are listed in parentheses.

Competition placements at senior level
Season	2022–23	2023–24	2024–25	2025–26	2026–27
Winter Olympics				23rd	
World Championships	8th	5th	12th		
European Championships	3rd	7th	4th	7th	
Swiss Championships	2nd	1st	1st		
GP Cup of China			6th		
GP France		10th			
GP NHK Trophy					TBD
GP Skate Canada			4th		
CS Budapest Trophy	2nd		2nd		3rd
CS Ice Challenge	3rd				
CS Nebelhorn Trophy		2nd	6th		
Denkova-Staviski Cup					5th
Japan Open		3rd (5th)			

Competition placements at junior level
Season	2019–20	2020–21	2021–22	2022–23
World Junior Championships			7th	7th
Swiss Championships	1st		1st	
JGP Latvia				6th
JGP Poland				4th
JGP Slovakia			8th	
NRW Trophy		1st	1st	
Santa Claus Cup			2nd	
Sofia Trophy		2nd		
Trophée Métropole Nice			1st	

== Detailed results ==
ISU personal best scores in the +5/-5 GOE System
Segment	Type	Score	Event
Total	TSS	196.02	2024 World Championships
Short program	TSS	68.68	2025 European Championships
Short program	TES	37.09	2025 European Championships
Short program	PCS	31.87	2024 Cup of China
Free skating	TSS	133.38	2024 World Championships
Free skating	TES	70.15	2024 World Championships
Free skating	PCS	64.08	2023 CS Nebelhorn Trophy

Small medals for short and free programs awarded only at ISU Championships.

=== Senior level ===
Results in the 2022-23 season
Date	Event	SP		FS		Total	
Date	Event	P	Score	P	Score	P	Score
Oct 13–16, 2022	(Hungary) 2022 CS Budapest Trophy	1	60.86	3	116.86	2	177.74
Nov 9–13, 2022	(Austria) 2022 CS Ice Challenge	9	53.22	2	116.13	3	169.35
Dec 15-16, 2022	(Switzerland) 2023 Swiss Championships	3	58.51	1	116.62	2	175.13
Jan 25–29, 2023	(Finland) 2023 European Championships	3	63.83	2	128.68	3	192.51
Mar 22–26, 2023	(Japan) 2023 World Championships	13	62.75	8	131.34	8	194.09

Results in the 2023-24 season
Date	Event	SP		FS		Total	
Date	Event	P	Score	P	Score	P	Score
Sep 20–23, 2023	(Germany) 2023 CS Nebelhorn Trophy	3	61.55	1	130.39	2	191.94
Oct 7, 2023	2023 Japan Open	—N/a	—N/a	5	122.63	5	—N/a
Nov 3–5, 2023	2023 Grand Prix de France	10	50.64	9	113.99	10	164.63
Dec 15–17, 2023	(Switzerland) 2024 Swiss Championships	1	64.80	1	122.66	1	187.46
Jan 10–14, 2024	(Lithuania) 2024 European Championships	8	60.34	7	120.48	7	180.82
Mar 18–24, 2024	(Canada) 2024 World Championships	12	62.64	4	133.38	5	196.02

Results in the 2024-25 season
Date	Event	SP		FS		Total	
Date	Event	P	Score	P	Score	P	Score
Sep 18–21, 2024	(Germany) 2024 CS Nebelhorn Trophy	10	53.45	6	118.87	6	172.32
Oct 11–13, 2024	(Hungary) 2024 CS Budapest Trophy	3	66.04	1	124.05	2	190.09
Oct 25–27, 2024	2024 Skate Canada International	3	66.94	5	124.13	4	191.07
Nov 22–24, 2024	2024 Cup of China	6	67.71	5	128.20	6	195.91
Dec 13–15, 2024	(Switzerland) 2025 Swiss Championships	1	64.02	1	133.36	1	197.38
Jan 28 – Feb 2, 2025	(Estonia) 2025 European Championships	3	68.68	5	117.96	4	186.64
Mar 25–30, 2025	(United States) 2025 World Championships	10	67.42	15	115.91	12	183.33

Results in the 2025–26 season
Date	Event	SP		FS		Total	
Date	Event	P	Score	P	Score	P	Score
Jan 13–18, 2026	(United Kingdom) 2026 European Championships	6	59.28	9	118.61	7	177.89
Feb 17–19, 2026	(Italy) 2026 Winter Olympics	21	59.20	23	100.34	23	159.54

Results in the 2026–27 season
Date	Event	SP		FS		Total	
Date	Event	P	Score	P	Score	P	Score
15–18 Oct 2026	(Hungary) 2026 CS Budapest Trophy	6	62.73	2	116.13	3	178.86
6–8 Nov, 2026	(Bulgaria) 2026 Denkova-Staviski Cup	3	59.26	6	108.04	5	167.30

=== Junior level ===
2022–23 season
Date	Event	SP	FS	Total
27 February–5 March 2023	2023 World Junior Championships	10; 57.96	6; 122.36	7; 180.32
28 September– 1 October 2022	2022 JGP Poland I	7; 59.39	4; 121.06	4; 180.45
7–10 September 2022	2022 JGP Latvia	4; 58.88	6; 110.08	6; 168.96
2021–22 season
13–17 April 2022	2022 World Junior Championships	8; 60.82	7; 116.28	7; 177.10
22–23 January 2022	2022 Swiss Junior Championships	1; 59.77	1; 117.52	1; 177.29
6–12 December 2021	2021 Santa Claus Cup	5; 57.67	1; 113.12	2; 170.79
4–7 November 2021	2021 NRW Trophy	2; 54.05	1; 104.68	1; 158.73
20–24 October 2021	2021 Trophée Métropole Nice	1; 55.70	1; 108.11	1; 163.81
1–4 September 2021	2021 JGP Slovakia	8; 51.97	8; 103.09	8; 155.06
2020–21 season
26 Feb. – 3 Mar. 2021	2021 Sofia Trophy	2; 63.00	2; 120.69	2; 183.69
26–29 November 2020	2020 NRW Trophy	1; 58.16	1; 111.46	1; 169.62
2019–20 season
1–2 February 2020	2020 Swiss Junior Championships	2; 56.78	1; 109.34	1; 166.12
