= Nicole Schott =

German figure skater

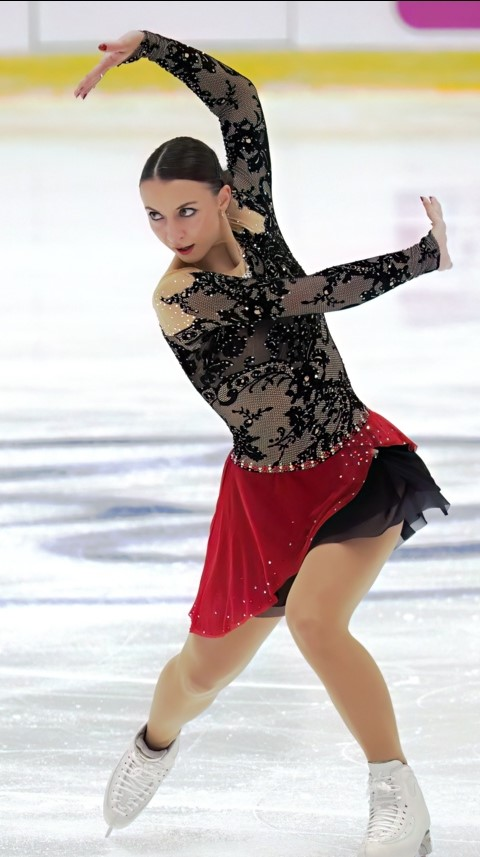
- Schott at the 2022 MK John Wilson Trophy

Personal information
- Born: 12 September 1996 (age 30) Essen, Germany
- Height: 1.64 m (5 ft 5 in)

Figure skating career
- Country: Germany
- Coach: Michael Huth
- Skating club: Essener Jugend FSC
- Began skating: 1999
- Retired: November 30, 2023
- Highest WS: 19th (2017–18 & 2014–15)

Nicole Schott (born 12 September 1996) is a retired German figure skater. She is the 2016 CS Warsaw Cup champion, the 2017 CS Tallinn Trophy bronze medalist, a two-time NRW Trophy champion (2014, 2016), and a seven-time German national champion (2012, 2015, 2018–20, 2022–23). She has finished within the top ten at two World and four European Championships.

Schott represented Germany at the 2018 and 2022 Winter Olympics, placing eighteenth and seventeenth, respectively.

== Personal life ==
Schott was born in Essen. Her father played ice hockey and her younger sister, Vivienne, is also a former competitive figure skater.

== Career ==
=== Early career ===
Schott began figure skating in 1999. Her first coach was Gudrun Pladdies.

She won the 2009 German Novice Championships.

=== 2010–11 season: Junior international debut ===
Making her international junior debut at the 2010 NRW Trophy, Schott finished fourteenth. She then went on to finish sixth at the 2011 German Championships.

Schott represented Germany at the World Junior Championships in Gangneung, South Korea. Ranked fifteenth in the short program, she qualified for the free skate and finished twenty-second overall.

=== 2011–12 season: Senior international debut and first national title ===
Beginning her season by competing the 2011 Ice Challenge and the 2011 Warsaw Cup, finishing seventh at the former and winning gold at the latter. She then competed on the senior level at the 2011 NRW Trophy, finishing twenty-first.

Schott won the German national senior title.

=== 2012–13 season ===
Schott began the season by competing on the junior level, finishing fifth at both the 2012 Crystal Skate of Romania and the 2012 Warsaw Cup. She then competed at the 2012 NRW Trophy, finishing sixth.

She went on to compete on the senior level at the 2013 German Championships, finishing eighth.

Schott then finished twelfth on the senior level at the 2013 Bavarian Open and fourteenth at the 2013 Coupe du Printemps.

=== 2013–14 season ===
Debuting on the Junior Grand Prix series, competing at the 2013 JGP Poland, finishing fourteenth. She went on to win gold at the 2013 Crystal Skate of Romania, place fourth at the 2013 Skate Celje and ninth at the 2013 NRW Trophy.

At the 2014 German Championships, Schott won the bronze medal.

She then finished ninth at the 2014 Bavarian Open and sixth at the 2014 Hellmut Seibt Memorial.

=== 2014–15 season ===
In the summer of 2014, Schott left longtime coach, Gudrun Pladdies, to train under Michael Huth in Oberstdorf.

She began the season by competing on the Junior Grand Prix series, placing seventh at the 2014 JGP Slovenia and tenth at the 2014 JGP Estonia.

She then went on to finish ninth at the 2014 CS Warsaw Cup as well as win her first senior international medal, gold, at the 2014 NRW Trophy. She then placed eleventh at the 2014 CS Golden Spin of Zagreb.

At the 2015 German Championships, Schott won the gold medal ahead of Nathalie Weinzierl by nine points.

Selected to compete at the 2015 European Championships in Stockholm, Sweden, Schott finished ninth. She then competed at the 2015 Bavarian Open, where she placed fifth.

She then won the bronze medal at the 2015 Coupe du Printemps.

Making her World Championship debut at the 2015 World Championships in Shanghai, China, Schott qualified for the free skate after placing nineteenth in the short program. She then placed twenty-third in the free skate and finished the event in twenty-third place overall.

=== 2015–16 season ===
Schott began the season on the Junior Grand Prix series, finishing eleventh at the 2015 JGP Slovakia. She went on to compete at the 2015 CS Warsaw Cup and the 2015 CS Tallinn Trophy, placing fourth and ninth, respectively.

At the 2016 German Championships, Schott won the bronze medal behind Lutricia Bock and Nathalie Weinzierl.

She then placed fourth at the 2016 Mentor Toruń Cup and won the silver medal at the 2016 FBMA Trophy.

=== 2016–17 season ===
Schott started the season by placing ninth at the 2016 CS Lombardia Trophy and fifth at the 2016 CS Finlandia Trophy. She also went on to win the bronze medal at the 2016 Golden Bear of Zagreb.

Schott then stepped on her first ISU Challenger Series podium, taking gold at the Warsaw Cup ahead of Australia's Kailani Craine. She then went on to win the gold medal at the 2016 NRW Trophy as well.

Competing at the 2017 European Championships in Ostrava, Czech Republic, Schott finished tenth.

At the 2017 World Championships in Helsinki, Finland, Schott advanced to the free skate segment of the competition by placing twenty-fourth in the short program. She then placed nineteenth in the free skate and moved up to nineteenth place overall.

=== 2017–18 season: PyeongChang Olympics ===
Schott began the season at the 2017 Cup of Nice, where she finished fourth.

Making her debut on the Grand Prix series, Schott placed tenth at the 2017 Rostelecom Cup and seventh at the 2017 Internationaux de France. She also competed at the 2017 CS Ice Star between each Grand Prix event, where she placed fifth.

Competing at the 2017 CS Tallinn Trophy and 2017 CS Golden Spin of Zagreb, Schott placed fifth and fourth, respectively.

Schott won her third national title at the 2018 German Championships, and was ultimately selected to compete at the European Championships, the Winter Olympics, and the World Championships.

At the European Championships, held in Moscow, Russia, Schott finished tenth for the second year in a row.

Competing for Team Germany in the short program of the team event at the 2018 Winter Olympics in Pyeongchang, South Korea, Schott placed eighth and ultimately earned Team Germany three points. She then competed in the ladies' singles event, placing fourteenth in the short program and seventeenth in the free skate, ultimately finishing eighteenth overall.

At the World Championships, held in Milan, Italy, Schott placed twelfth in the short program and fourteenth in the free skate, ultimately finishing the event in thirteenth place overall.

=== 2018–19 season ===
Although assigned to compete on the Grand Prix series at the 2018 Grand Prix of Helsinki and the 2018 Rostelecom Cup, Schott withdrew from both events due to the flu and a still-healing knee injury.

Competing at the 2018 CS Tallinn Trophy and the 2018 CS Golden Spin of Zagreb, Schott finished tenth at both events.

At the 2019 German Championships, Schott won her fourth national title.

Competing at the 2019 European Championships in Minsk, Belarus, Schott finished sixteenth.

She then went on to win silver at both the 2019 Jégvirág Cup and the 2017 Cup of Tyrol.

At the 2019 World Championships in Saitama, Japan, Schott placed twelfth in the short program and seventeenth in the free skate, ultimately finishing sixteenth overall.

=== 2019–20 season ===
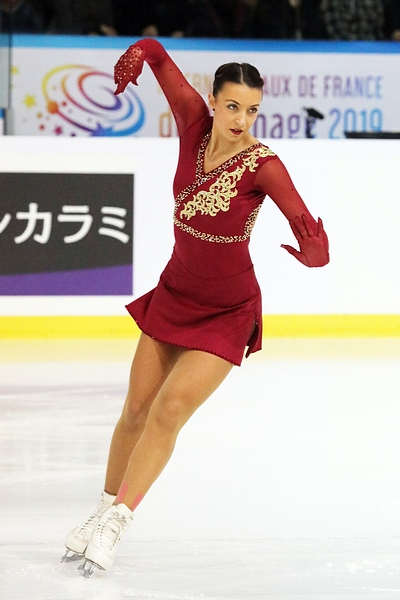
Schott at the 2019 Internationaux de France

Beginning her season by competing at the 2019 CS Nebelhorn Trophy, Schott won the bronze medal. She went on to compete at the 2019 Golden Bear of Zagreb, where she placed fourth.

Competing at the 2019 Internationaux de France, Schott finished seventh. She then competed at the 2019 CS Golden Spin of Zagreb, where she won the bronze medal.

At the 2020 German Championships, Schott won the national title for the fifth time.

Selected to compete at the European Championships in Graz, Austria, Schott finished thirteenth.

Although assigned to compete at the 2020 World Championships in Montreal, Quebec, the event was ultimately cancelled due to rising concerns about the COVID-19 pandemic.

=== 2020–21 season ===
Schott began the season at the 2020 CS Nebelhorn Trophy, finishing fourth.

Although assigned to compete at the 2020 Internationaux de France, the event was ultimately cancelled due to the COVID-19 pandemic.

Due to several COVID-19 cases at her training rink in Obsterstorf, Schott made the decision to withdraw from the 2021 German Championships. Nonetheless, Schott was selected to compete at the 2021 World Championships in Stockholm, Sweden, where she finished eighteenth.

=== 2021–22 season: Beijing Olympics ===
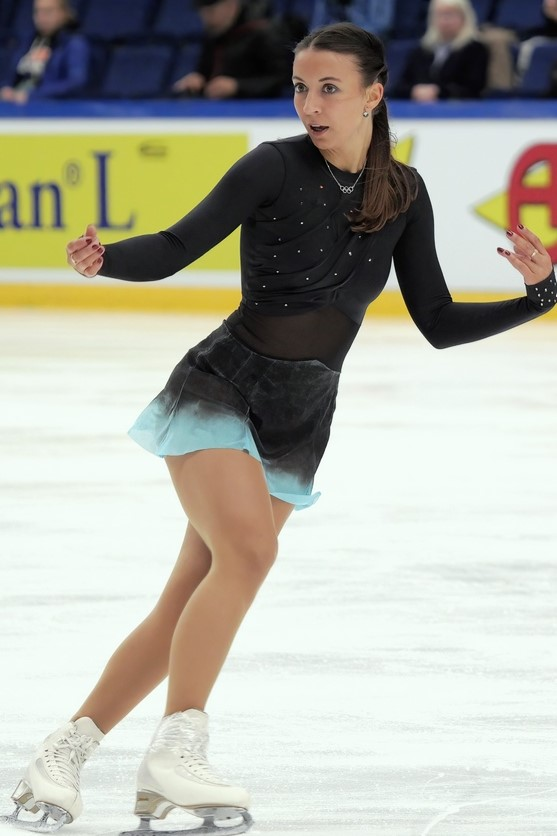
Schott at the 2021 CS Finlandia Trophy

Schott started the season at the 2021 CS Finlandia Trophy, placing seventeenth.

She went on to compete on the Grand Prix series, finishing tenth at the 2021 Gran Premio d'Italia and eighth at the 2021 NHK Trophy. She then competed at the 2021 CS Warsaw Cup and the 2022 Asian Open Trophy, finishing fourth and sixth, respectively.

At the 2022 German Championships, Schott won her sixth national title.

Selected to compete at the 2022 European Championships in Tallinn, Estonia, Schott placed ninth.

Named to her second German Olympic team, Schott competed in the team event short program for Team Germany at the 2022 Winter Olympics in Beijing, China, Schott finished sixth in that segment and ultimately earned five points for Team Germany. Schott then competed in the Women's singles event, placing fourteenth in the short program and nineteenth in the free skate, finishing seventeenth overall.

International Skating Union banned all Russian and Belarusian skaters from competing at the 2022 World Championships in Montpellier, France. This had a major impact on the women's field, dominated by Russians for most of the preceding eight years. Schott unexpectedly placed sixth in the short program with a new personal best. Fourteenth in the free skate, she was tenth overall.

=== 2022–23 season ===
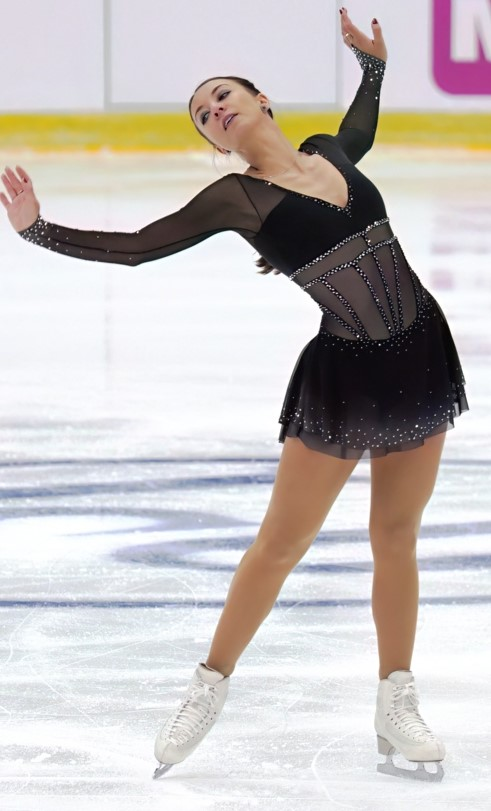
Nicole Schott at the 2022 MK John Wilson Trophy

Schott began the season by competing at the 2022 CS Budapest Trophy, where she finished tenth. She then competed on the Grand Prix series, finishing seventh at 2022 Skate America and sixth at the 2022 MK John Wilson Trophy.

Competing at the 2022 CS Warsaw Cup and the 2022 CS Golden Spin of Zagreb, Schott placed fourth and seventh, respectively.

At the 2023 German Championships, Schott won the national title for the seventh time.

Competing at the 2023 European Championships in Espoo, Finland, Schott placed sixteenth in the short program and ninth in the free skate, finishing in ninth-place overall.

At the 2023 World Championships in Saitama, Japan, Schott delivered a clean short and free program, ultimately scoring personal bests in all segments of the competition. She placed seventh in the short program and ninth in the free skate, finishing the event in seventh place overall.

=== 2023–24 season: Retirement ===
Schott withdrew from her Grand Prix assignments for the 2023–2024 season in August 2023 before ultimately announcing her retirement from competitive figure skating on November 30, 2023.

== Post-competitive career ==
Following her retirement, Schott began working as a coach and choreographer in Oberstdorf, aiding long-time coach, Michael Huth. Skaters she has worked with have included Léa Serna, Anastasia Brandenburg, Kornel Witkowski, and Davide Lewton Brain.

== Programs ==
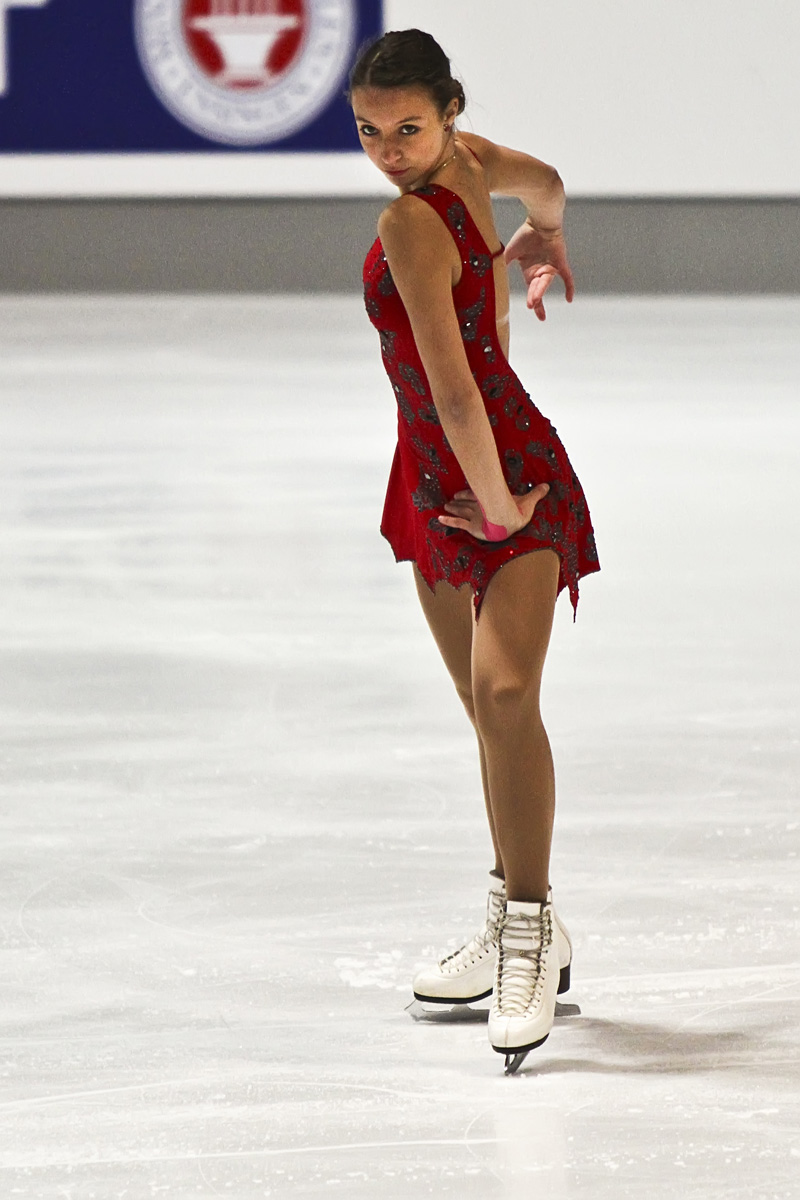
Schott at the 2012 German Championships

Season	Short program	Free skating	Exhibition
2022–2023	Rain, In Your Black Eyes by Ezio Bosso choreo. by Andrea Vaturi; Despedida by Shakira choreo. by Andrea Vaturi	Bohemian Rhapsody by Queen performed by Daisy Gray choreo. by Carolina Kostner	Careless Whisper by George Michael performed by Indiana
2021–2022	Adiós Nonino by Astor Piazzolla performed by Milva choreo. by Carolina Kostner	Rain, In Your Black Eyes by Ezio Bosso choreo. by Andrea Vaturi	
2020–2021	Flashdance... What a Feeling written by Giorgio Moroder, Keith Forsey & Irene Cara performed by Caroline Costa choreo. by Michael Huth, David Cipolleschi	L'Inverno Winter Op. 8 No. 4 Largo; L'Inverno Winter Op. 8 No. 4 Allegro; L'Inverno Winter Op. 8 No. 4 in F III Allegro (from The Four Seasons) by Antonio Vivaldi choreo. by Michael Huth, David Cipolleschi, Carolina Kostner	
2019–2020	Caught Out in the Rain by Beth Hart choreo. by Michael Huth, David Cipolleschi	Kung Fu Panda by Hans Zimmer & John Powell; Crouching Tiger, Hidden Dragon by Tan Dun; Memoirs of a Geisha by John Williams choreo. by Michael Huth, David Cipolleschi	
2018–2019	With You (from Ghost: The Musical) performed by Caissie Levy choreo. by Michael Huth, Vanessa Gusmeroli	Pas sans toi performed by Lara Fabian choreo. by Michael Huth, Vanessa Gusmeroli	
2017–2018	Nella Fantasia performed by Jackie Evancho choreo. by Michael Huth	Schindler's List by John Williams performed by Itzhak Perlman choreo. by Michael Huth	
2016–2017	Cell Block Tango (from Chicago) performed by Catherine Zeta-Jones choreo. by Michael Huth, Rostislav Sinicyn	Nocturne No. 20 by Frédéric Chopin performed by Joshua Bell, Michael Stern, and Academy of St. Martin in the Fields choreo. by Michael Huth, Rostislav Sinicyn	
2015–2016	Send In the Clowns by Ruthie Henshall choreo. by Michael Huth	A Time for Us (from Romeo and Juliet) by Nino Rota performed by Bárbara Padilla choreo. by Rostislav Sinicyn	
2014–2015	The Chairman's Waltz (from Memoirs of a Geisha) by John Williams choreo. by Rostislav Sinicyn	A Time for Us (from Romeo and Juliet) by Nino Rota performed by Bárbara Padilla choreo. by Rostislav Sinicyn; Prayer for Taylor by Michael W. Smith; Requiem for a Dream by Clint Mansell	
2012–2014	El Tango de Roxanne (from Moulin Rouge!) by Craig Armstrong	Prayer for Taylor by Michael W. Smith	
2010–2012	El Tango de Roxanne (from Moulin Rouge!) by Craig Armstrong	Nothing Else Matters by Metallica choreo. by Natasha Devisch	
2010–2011	El Tango de Roxanne (from Moulin Rouge!) by Craig Armstrong	Nothing Else Matters by Metallica choreo. by Natasha Devisch	

== Competitive highlights ==
GP: Grand Prix; CS: Challenger Series; JGP: Junior Grand Prix

=== 2014-15 to Present ===
International
Event	14–15	15–16	16–17	17–18	18–19	19–20	20–21	21–22	22–23
Olympics				18th				16th	
Worlds	23rd		19th	13th	16th	C	18th	10th	7th
Europeans	9th		10th	10th	16th	13th		12th	9th
GP France				7th		7th	C		
GP Italy								10th	
GP NHK Trophy								8th	
GP Rostelecom				10th	WD	9th			
GP Skate America									7th
GP Skate Canada									
GP Wilson Trophy									6th
CS Asian Open								6th	
CS Budapest							WD		10th
CS Finlandia			5th					17th	
CS Golden Spin	11th			4th	10th	3rd			7th
CS Ice Star				5th					
CS Lombardia			9th						
CS Nebelhorn					WD	3rd	4th		
CS Tallinn		9th		3rd	10th				
CS Warsaw Cup	9th	4th	1st			WD		4th	4th
Bavarian Open	5th							2nd	
Cup of Nice				4th					
Cup of Tyrol					2nd				
FBMA Trophy		2nd							
Golden Bear			3rd			4th			
Jégvirág Cup					2nd				
NRW Trophy	1st		1st				WD		
Printemps	3rd								
Toruń Cup		4th							
International: Junior
JGP Estonia	10th								
JGP Slovakia		11th							
JGP Slovenia	7th								
National
German Champ.	1st	3rd	WD	1st	1st	1st	WD	1st	1st
Team events
Olympics				7th T 8th P				9th T 6th P	
TBD = Assigned; WD = Withdrew; C = Event cancelled T = Team result; P = Personal result

=== 2007-08 to 2013-14 ===
International
Event	09–10	10–11	11–12	12–13	13–14
Bavarian Open				12th	9th
Hellmut Seibt					6th
NRW Trophy			21st		
Printemps				14th	
International: Junior
Junior Worlds		22nd			
JGP Poland					14th
Bavarian Open	7th				
Crystal Skate				5th	1st
Ice Challenge			7th		
NRW Trophy		14th		6th	9th
Skate Celje					4th
Warsaw Cup			1st	5th	
National
German Champ.	8th J	6th	1st	8th	3rd
TBD = Assigned; WD = Withdrew; C = Event cancelled Levels: N = Novice; J = Junior

== Detailed results ==
Current personal best scores are highlighted in bold.

=== Senior level ===
2022–2023 season
Date	Event	SP	FS	Total
22–26 March 2023	2023 World Championships	7; 67.29	9; **130.47**	7; **197.76**
25–29 January 2023	2023 European Championships	16; 54.33	9; 109.49	9; 163.82
5–7 January 2023	2023 German Championships	1; 64.89	1; 127.78	1; 192.67
7–10 December 2022	2022 CS Golden Spin of Zagreb	6; 52.36	9; 110.60	7; 162.96
17–20 November 2022	2022 CS Warsaw Cup	5; 52.94	3; 119.62	4; 172.56
11–13 November 2022	2022 MK John Wilson Trophy	7; 60.38	6; 121.03	6; 181.41
21–23 October 2022	2022 Skate America	10; 56.47	8; 103.88	7; 160.35
13–16 October 2022	2022 CS Budapest Trophy	11; 51.45	8; 96.01	10; 147.46
2021–2022 season
Date	Event	SP	FS	Total
21–27 March 2022	2022 World Championships	6; **67.77**	14; 120.65	10; 188.42
15–17 February 2022	2022 Winter Olympics – Women's singles	13; 63.13	18; 114.52	16; 177.65
4–7 February 2022	2022 Winter Olympics – Team event	6; 62.66	–	9^{T}
18–23 January 2022	2022 Bavarian Open	4; 55.59	2; 114.44	2; 170.03
10–16 January 2022	2022 European Championships	11; 61.86	14; 108.32	13; 170.18
9–11 December 2021	2022 German Championships	1; 59.75	1; 119.00	1; 178.75
17–20 November 2021	2021 CS Warsaw Cup	4; 63.03	5; 123.63	4; 186.66
12–14 November 2021	2021 NHK Trophy	8; 59.26	7; 113.11	8; 172.37
5–7 November 2021	2021 Gran Premio d'Italia	10; 58.33	10; 108.87	10; 167.20
13–17 October 2021	2021 CS Asian Open Trophy	6; 52.84	5; 95.24	6; 148.08
7–10 October 2021	2021 CS Finlandia Trophy	11; 60.25	17; 100.98	17; 161.23
2020–21 season
Date	Event	SP	FS	Total
22–28 March 2021	2021 World Championships	20; 59.09	17; 113.71	18; 172.80
23–26 September 2020	2020 CS Nebelhorn Trophy	2; 61.21	8; 95.06	4; 156.27
2019–20 season
Date	Event	SP	FS	Total
20–26 January 2020	2020 European Championships	14; 58.06	14; 104.20	13; 162.26
1–3 January 2020	2020 German Championships	1; 67.31	1; 127.29	1; 194.60
4–7 December 2019	2019 CS Golden Spin of Zagreb	3; 61.78	4; 120.93	3; 182.71
15–17 November 2019	2019 Rostelecom Cup	8; 57.29	8; 114.79	9; 172.08
1–3 November 2019	2019 Internationaux de France	10; 54.43	6; 112.46	7; 166.89
24–27 October 2019	2019 Golden Bear of Zagreb	5; 55.56	3; 114.43	4; 169.99
25–28 September 2019	2019 CS Nebelhorn Trophy	3; 64.09	6; 113.67	3; 177.76
2018–19 season
Date	Event	SP	FS	Total
18–24 March 2019	2019 World Championships	12; 63.18	17; 107.38	16; 170.56
26 February–3 March 2019	2019 Cup of Tyrol	4; 54.25	3; 105.48	2; 159.73
15–17 February 2019	2019 Jégvirág Cup	5; 45.02	1; 89.97	2; 134.99
21–27 January 2019	2019 European Championships	19; 50.68	16; 98.58	16; 149.26
21–23 December 2018	2019 German Championships	1; 62.59	1; 105.08	1; 167.67
5–8 December 2018	2018 CS Golden Spin of Zagreb	9; 55.44	10; 94.30	10; 149.74
26 November–2 December 2018	2018 CS Tallinn Trophy	13; 50.42	9; 104.41	10; 154.83
2017–18 season
Date	Event	SP	FS	Total
19–25 March 2018	2018 World Championships	12; 61.84	14; 112.29	13; 174.13
21–23 February 2018	2018 Winter Olympics – Ladies' singles	14; 59.20	17; 109.26	18; 168.46
9–12 February 2018	2018 Winter Olympics – Team event	8; 55.32	–	7^{T}
15–21 January 2018	2018 European Championships	18; 48.37	7; 109.47	10; 157.84
14–16 December 2017	2018 German Championships	1; 59.20	1; 118.66	1; 177.86
6–9 December 2017	2017 CS Golden Spin of Zagreb	5; 55.91	3; 111.45	4; 167.36
21–26 November 2017	2017 CS Tallinn Trophy	5; 57.68	4; 113.85	3; 171.53
17–19 November 2017	2017 Internationaux de France	10; 55.54	7; 116.85	7; 172.39
26–29 October 2017	2017 CS Ice Star	4; 57.70	5; 103.92	5; 161.62
20–22 October 2017	2017 Rostelecom Cup	10; 55.55	10; 113.17	10; 168.72
11–15 October 2017	2017 Cup of Nice	3; 58.35	5; 97.27	4; 155.62
2016–17 season
Date	Event	SP	FS	Total
29 March–2 April 2017	2017 World Championships	24; 54.83	19; 106.58	19; 161.41
25–29 January 2017	2017 European Championships	9; 56.88	10; 103.75	10; 160.63
30 November–4 December 2016	2016 NRW Trophy	1; 57.60	1; 110.10	1; 167.70
17–20 November 2016	2016 CS Warsaw Cup	1; 60.47	2; 105.45	1; 165.92
27–30 October 2016	2016 Golden Bear of Zagreb	4; 52.64	4; 99.26	3; 151.90
6–10 October 2016	2016 CS Finlandia Trophy	7; 51.03	7; 98.97	5; 150.00
8–11 September 2016	2016 CS Lombardia Trophy	6; 55.07	10; 89.10	9; 144.17

=== Junior level ===
2015–16 season
Date	Event	Level	SP	FS	Total
21–23 January 2016	2016 FBMA Trophy	Senior	1; 46.30	3; 66.69	2; 112.99
6–10 January 2016	2016 Mentor Toruń Cup	Senior	7; 46.96	3; 91.64	4; 138.60
11–13 December 2015	2016 German Championships	Senior	2; 56.32	3; 100.57	3; 156.89
27–29 November 2015	2015 CS Warsaw Cup	Senior	5; 48.84	4; 92.07	4; 140.91
18–22 November 2015	2015 CS Tallinn Trophy	Senior	5; 51.72	11; 92.58	9; 144.30
19–22 August 2015	2015 JGP Slovakia	Junior	13; 38.39	11; 77.17	11; 115.56
2014–15 season
Date	Event	Level	SP	FS	Total
23–29 March 2015	2015 World Championships	Senior	19; 49.29	23; 78.27	23; 127.56
13–15 March 2015	2015 Coupe du Printemps	Senior	2; 51.82	4; 81.53	3; 133.35
11–15 February 2015	2015 Bavarian Open	Senior	6; 50.77	3; 85.64	5; 136.41
26 January–1 February 2015	2015 European Championships	Senior	9; 52.03	8; 101.60	9; 153.63
12–14 December 2014	2015 German Championships	Senior	2; 58.01	1; 107.27	1; 165.28
4–6 December 2014	2014 CS Golden Spin of Zagreb	Senior	3; 56.46	15; 80.95	11; 137.41
26–30 November 2014	2014 NRW Trophy	Senior	1; 51.29	2; 83.05	1; 134.34
21–24 November 2014	2014 CS Warsaw Cup	Senior	6; 46.43	13; 73.84	9; 120.27
24–27 September 2014	2014 JGP Estonia	Junior	13; 44.50	9; 81.84	10; 126.34
27–30 August 2014	2014 JGP Slovenia	Junior	6; 49.53	7; 91.43	7; 140.96
2013–14 season
Date	Event	Level	SP	FS	Total
26 February–1 March 2014	2014 Hellmut Seibt Memorial	Senior	10; 41.43	5; 84.01	6; 125.44
29 January–2 February 2014	2014 Bavarian Open	Senior	13; 39.79	7; 76.43	9; 116.22
14–15 December 2013	2014 German Championships	Senior	5; 47.36	3; 98.12	3; 145.48
4–8 December 2013	2013 NRW Trophy	Junior	16; 35.70	7; 80.31	9; 116.01
14–17 November 2013	2013 Skate Celje	Junior	5; 39.78	2; 74.31	4; 114.09
24–27 October 2013	2013 Crystal Skate of Romania	Junior	1; 37.97	1; 84.63	1; 122.60
18–21 September 2013	2013 JGP Poland	Junior	13; 41.10	15; 63.17	14; 104.27
2012–13 season
Date	Event	Level	SP	FS	Total
22–24 March 2013	2013 Coupe du Printemps	Senior	12; 38.60	16; 61.21	14; 99.81
6–11 February 2013	2013 Bavarian Open	Senior	17; 40.44	8; 82.70	12; 123.14
21–22 December 2012	2013 German Championships	Senior	11; 37.51	6; 71.78	8; 109.29
4–9 December 2012	2012 NRW Trophy	Junior	9; 41.27	5; 81.07	6; 122.34
30 October–4 November 2012	2012 Crystal Skate of Romania	Junior	11; 35.55	3; 72.67	5; 108.22
15–18 November 2012	2012 Warsaw Cup	Junior	8; 38.26	5; 72.56	5; 110.82
2011–12 season
Date	Event	Level	SP	FS	Total
6–7 January 2012	2012 German Championships	Senior	2; 45.23	1; 86.42	1; 131.65
29 November–4 December 2011	2011 NRW Trophy	Senior	15; 43.52	25; 70.60	21; 114.12
17–20 November 2011	2011 Warsaw Cup	Junior	2; 38.03	1; 78.64	1; 116.67
1–6 November 2011	2011 Ice Challenge	Junior	4; 40.58	15; 63.03	7; 103.61
2010–11 season
Date	Event	Level	SP	FS	Total
28 February–6 March 2011	2011 World Junior Championships	Junior	15; 41.41	23; 65.13	22; 106.54
7–9 January 2011	2011 German Championships	Senior	6; 40.20	4; 85.46	6; 125.66
2–5 December 2010	2010 NRW Trophy	Junior	11; 36.01	17; 60.45	14; 96.46
2009–10 season
Date	Event	Level	SP	FS	Total
28–30 January 2010	2010 Bavarian Open	Junior	8; 34.94	7; 60.20	7; 95.14
17–20 December 2009	2010 German Junior Championships	Junior	12; 32.96	7; 64.93	8; 97.89
