= Davide Lewton Brain =

Monégasque figure skater (born 1998)

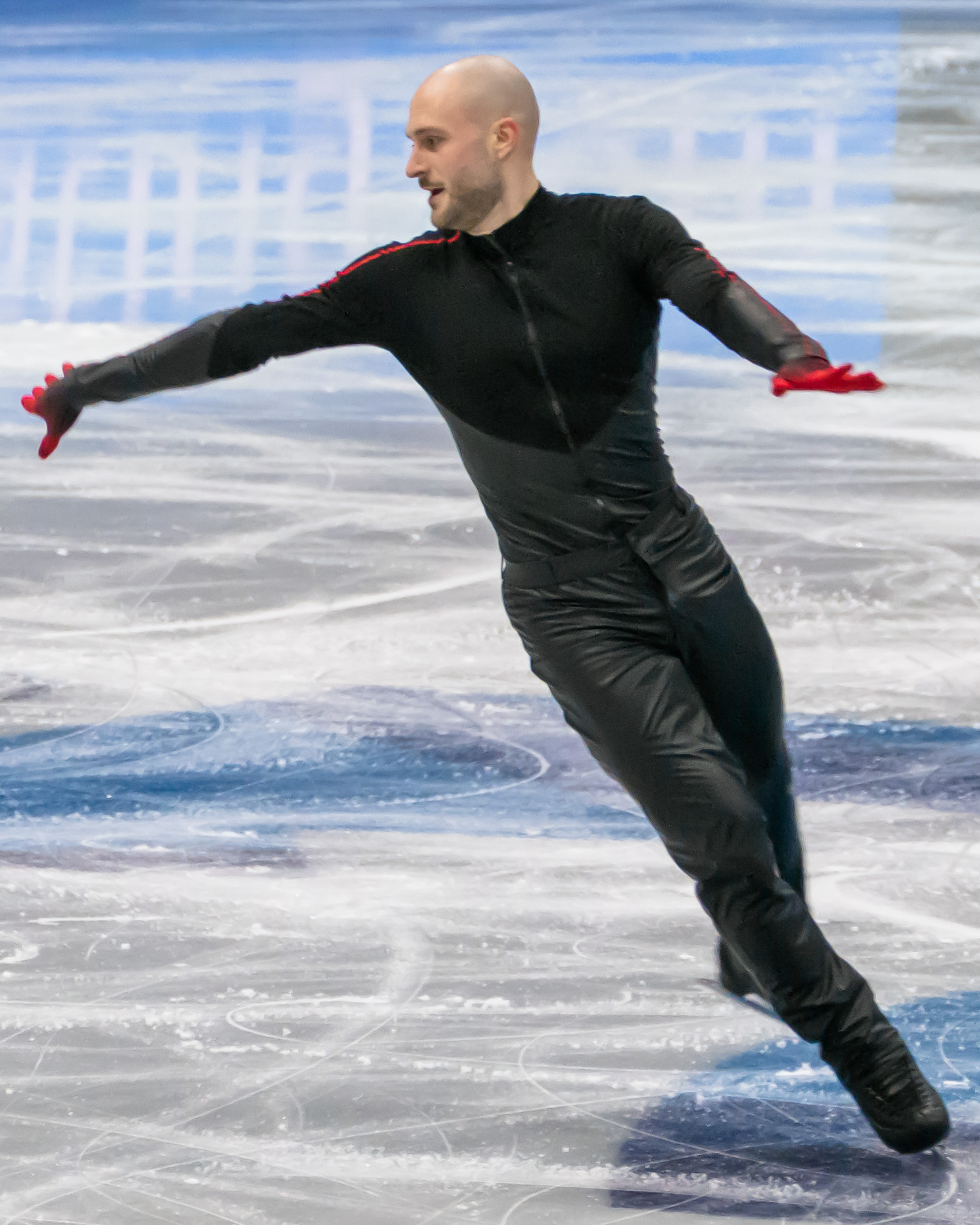
- Davide Lewton Brain at the 2025 World Championships

Personal information
- Born: 23 December 1998 (age 27) Nice, France
- Home town: Monaco
- Height: 1.74 m (5 ft 8 1/2 in)

Figure skating career
- Country: Monaco
- Discipline: Men's singles
- Coach: Michael Huth; Nicole Schott
- Skating club: Skating Club of Monaco
- Began skating: 2008

Medal record
Monaco Championships
Gold medal – first place	2018	Singles
Gold medal – first place	2019	Singles

Davide Lewton Brain (born 23 December 1998) is a Monégasque figure skater who competes in men's singles. He is a multiple-time Monégasque national champion and has represented Monaco at the European and World Figure Skating Championships. He was the first alternate for the men's singles event at the 2026 Winter Olympic Games.

In 2024, Lewton Brain became the first Monégasque figure skater to qualify for the World Championships.

== Personal life ==
Lewton Brain was born on 23 December 1998 in Nice, France, and was raised in Monaco until the age of 15. He studied marketing at INSEEC Business School, earning a master's degree in 2022.

His father, Peter Lewton-Brain, danced professionally with the National Ballet of Portugal and Les Ballets de Monte-Carlo before becoming an osteopath specializing in movement sciences and earning a PhD focused on performance health and rehabilitation for dancers. His mother, Paola Cantalupo, trained at the Teatro alla Scala in Milan and became a principal dancer (Étoile) with Les Ballets de Monte-Carlo, performing leading roles in both classical and contemporary repertoires. After retiring from the stage, she was appointed Artistic and Pedagogical Director of the École Supérieure de Danse de Cannes Rosella Hightower.

== Career ==
=== Early career ===
Lewton Brain began skating in 2008 at the age of nine. Initially attracted to playing hockey, he decided to switch to figure skating after watching videos of Philippe Candeloro competing. At the age of fifteen, Lewton Brain moved from his hometown of Monaco to Annecy to be coached by Didier Lucine, Claudie Lucine, and Sophie Golaz. He has always competed internationally for Monaco.

As a junior skater, Lewton Brain competed at the 2017 and 2018 World Junior Championships, finishing forty-third and thirty-second, respectively. He also made his European Championship debut in 2018, where he finished thirty-first.

=== 2018–19 season ===
In his first season as a full-fledged senior level skater, Lewton Brain started the season at 2018 Master's de Patinage, finishing fifth. He then went on to place eleventh, ninth, and nineteenth at the 2018 Ice Star, the 2018 Volvo Open Cup, and the 2018 CS Golden Spin of Zagreb, respectively.

At the 2018 French Championships, Lewton Brain finished sixth. He then competed at the 2019 European Championships in Minsk, Belarus, where he advanced to the free skate for the first time at these championships, finishing twenty-fourth overall. He would go on to end his season by winning silver at the 2019 Coupe du Printemps and finishing seventh at the 2019 Egna Spring Trophy.

=== 2019–20 season ===
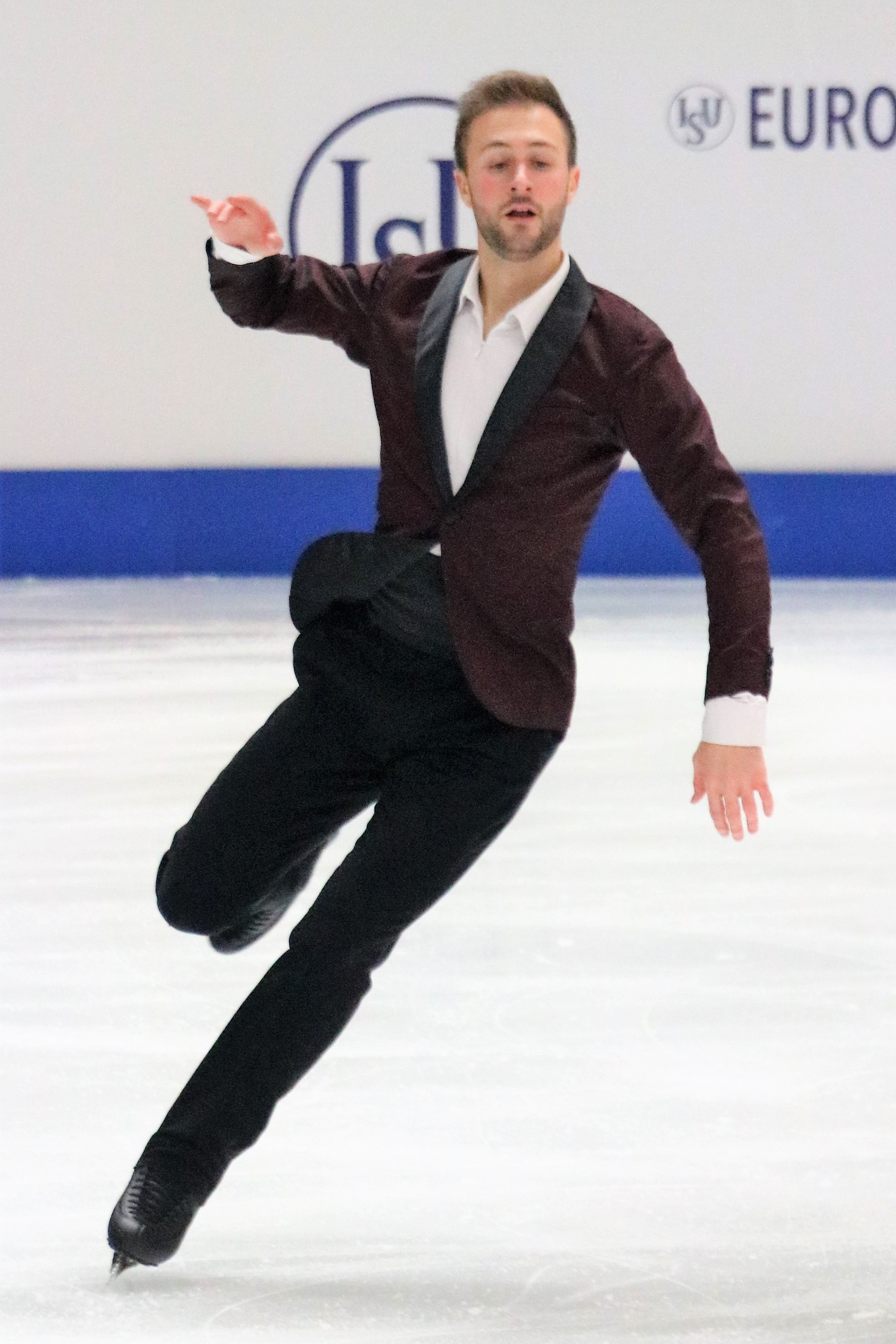
Lewton Brain at the 2020 European Championships

Lewton Brain started the season by finishing sixth at the 2019 Master's de Patinage, eleventh at the 2019 Volvo Open Cup, and fifth at the 2019 Denkova-Staviski Cup. Selected to compete at the 2020 European Championships in Graz, Austria, Lewton Brain placed twenty-ninth in the short program and did not advance to the free skate segment.

He would end the season by finishing second at the 2020 Dragon Trophy, seventh at the 2020 Tallink Hotels Cup, and thirteenth at the 2020 International Challenge Cup.

=== 2020–21 season ===
Lewton Brain began the season by finishing tenth at the 2020 Master's de Patinage. He then finished fourth out of the five skaters that competed at the 2021 French Championships. Lewton Brain would go on to close his season by winning silver at the 2021 Sofia Trophy and placing fifth at the 2021 Egna Spring Trophy.

=== 2021–22 season ===
Beginning the season by competing on the 2021–22 ISU Challenger Series, Lewton Brain placed ninth at the 2021 CS Lombardia Trophy and nineteenth at the 2021 CS Nebelhorn Trophy. He would go on to finish fifth at the 2021 Master's de Patinage, sixth at the 2021 Budapest Trophy, third at the 2021 Trophée Métropole Nice Côte d'Azur, and sixth at the 2021 Tayside Trophy.

At the 2022 French Championships, Lewton Brain would come in fifth place. He would then compete at the European Championships for a fourth time, finishing twentieth at the event in Tallinn, Estonia. Lewton Brain then took silver at the 2022 Sofia Trophy, gold at the 2022 Dragon Trophy, before finishing eleventh at the 2022 International Challenge Cup.

=== 2022–23 season ===
Lewton Brain began the season by competing at the 2022 Master's de Patinage and the 2022 Trophée Métropole Nice Côte d'Azur, finishing fourth and third, respectively. He would then go on to finish sixth at the 2022 CS Ice Challenge before winning gold at both the 2022 Open d'Andorra and the 2022 Santa Claus Cup.

At the 2023 French Championships, Lewton Brain would place fifth for a second consecutive time. One month later, he competed at the 2023 European Championships in Espoo, Finland, where he finished in twenty-second place. Lewton Brain then finished the season by winning silver at the 2023 Dragon Trophy and ninth at the 2023 International Challenge Cup.

=== 2023–24 season ===
In September 2023, it was announced that Lewton Brain had relocated to Oberstdorf, Germany, where Michael Huth had become his new coach. He started the season by competing on the 2023–24 ISU Challenger Series, placing ninth at the 2023 CS Nebelhorn Trophy and fourteenth at the 2023 CS Finlandia Trophy. He would then go on to compete at the 2023 Trophée Métropole Nice Côte d'Azur and the 2023 Swiss Open, finishing fifth and first, respectively.

In December, Lewton Brain competed at the 2024 French Championships, finishing in eleventh place. Selected to compete at the 2024 European Championships in Kaunas, Lithuania, Lewton Brain would finish twenty-fourth. He then competed at the 2024 Bavarian Open and the 2024 Merano Cup, placing seventh and fifth, respectively.

Making his World Championship debut at the 2024 World Championships in Montreal, Quebec, Canada, Lewton Brain placed twenty-sixth in the short program, failing to advance to the free skate segment of the competition.

=== 2024–25 season ===
Lewton Brain began the season by competing at the 2024 Master's de Patinage, finishing in eighth place. He then went on to place eighteenth at the 2024 CS Trophée Métropole Nice Côte d'Azur, fourth at the 2024 NRW Trophy, second at the 2024 Santa Claus Cup, and twelfth at the 2024 CS Golden Spin of Zagreb.

In December, Lewton Brain finished ninth at the 2025 French Championships. The following month, he placed seventh at the 2025 Bavarian Open and twenty-fifth at the 2025 European Championships.

Following a seventh-place finish at the 2025 Merano Ice Trophy, Lewton Brain closed the season by placing thirty-ninth at the 2025 World Championships.

=== 2025–26 season ===
Lewton Brain opened his season with a fourth-place finish at the 2025 Master's de Patinage. In September, he competed at the ISU Skate to Milano, the final qualifying event for the 2026 Winter Olympics. Lewton Brain finished the event in sixth place and as a result, Monaco earned the first alternate position for the Olympic men's singles event.

Lewton Brain went on to win bronze at the 2025 Trophée Métropole Nice Côte d'Azur, another bronze at the 2025 Swiss Open, and gold at the 2025 Cup of Innsbruck. He subsequently competed on the 2025–26 Challenger Series, finishing fourteenth at the 2025 CS Tallinn Trophy and sixteenth at the 2025 CS Golden Spin of Zagreb.

In January, Lewton Brain competed at the 2026 European Championships in Sheffield, England, United Kingdom, finishing in twentieth place overall.

== Programs ==
Season	Short program	Free skating
2015–2016	Swing Supreme by Robbie Williams choreo. by Camille Pradier	Vendetta by Maxime Rodriguez choreo. by Camille Pradier
2016–2017	Swing Supreme by Robbie Williams choreo. by Camille Pradier	Comptine d'un autre été by Martin Ermen; Mon amant de Saint-Jean by Patrick Bruel choreo. by Camille Pradier
2017–2018	Dream a Little Dream of Me performed by Michael Bublé choreo. by Camille Pradier	Comptine d'un autre été by Martin Ermen; Mon amant de Saint-Jean by Patrick Bruel choreo. by Camille Pradier
2018–2019	Dream a Little Dream of Me performed by Michael Bublé choreo. by Camille Pradier	It Had to Be You performed by Harry Connick Jr. choreo. by Mérovée Ephrem
2019–2020	Smile by Charlie Chaplin performed by Gregory Porter choreo. by Mérovée Ephrem	The Artist; The Artist Overture; Waltz for Peppy; Peppy and George by Ludovic Bource choreo. by Mérovée Ephrem
2020–2021	Smile by Charlie Chaplin performed by Gregory Porter choreo. by Mérovée Ephrem	Poeta by Vicente Amigo arranged by Maxime Rodriguez choreo. by Mérovée Ephrem
2021–2022	The Real Me by Paper Plane & Laurent Aknin arranged by Cédric Tour choreo. by Benoît Richaud	Poeta by Vicente Amigo arranged by Maxime Rodriguez choreo. by Mérovée Ephrem
2022–2023	The Real Me by Paper Plane & Laurent Aknin arranged by Cédric Tour choreo. by Benoît Richaud	The Sound of Silence by Simon & Garfunkel performed by Disturbed arranged by Maxime Rodriguez choreo. by Madison Hubbell, Adrián Díaz, Mérovée Ephrem
2023–2024	Sign of the Times by Harry Styles arranged by Cédric Tour choreo. by Line Haddad, Nathanael Marie	The Sound of Silence by Simon & Garfunkel performed by Disturbed arranged by Maxime Rodriguez choreo. by Madison Hubbell, Adrián Díaz, Mérovée Ephrem
2024–2025	L'enfer by Stromae arranged by Cédric Tour choreo. by Kévin Aymoz	La terre vue du ciel by Armand Amar; Faith of Dawn by Eternal Eclipse both arranged by Maxime Rodriguez choreo. by Guillaume Cizeron
2025–2026	L'enfer by Stromae arranged by Cédric Tour choreo. by Kévin Aymoz	My Perception of Love by Benjamin Amaru; Devouring Passion by Karl Hugo choreo. by Kévin Aymoz

== Competitive highlights ==
- JGP – Event of the ISU Junior Grand Prix Series
- CS – Event of the ISU Challenger Series
- TBD – Assigned
- WD – Withdrew from competition

Competition placements at senior level
Season	2016–17	2017–18	2018–19	2019–20	2020–21	2021–22	2022–23	2023–24	2024–25	2025–26	2026–27
World Championships								26th	39th		
European Championships		31st	24th	29th		20th	22nd	24th	25th	20th	
French Championships		11th	6th		4th	5th	5th	11th	9th		
Monaco Championships		1st	1st								
CS Finlandia Trophy								14th			
CS Golden Spin of Zagreb			13th						12th	16th	
CS Ice Challenge							6th				
CS Ice Star		17th	11th								
CS Lombardia Trophy						9th					
CS Nebelhorn Trophy						19th		9th			
CS Tallinn Trophy										14th	
CS Trophée Métropole Nice									17th		
CS Budapest Trophy						6th					16th
Bavarian Open								7th	7th		
Coupe du Printemps			2nd								
Cup of Innsbruck										1st	
Challenge Cup				13th		11th	9th				
Denkova-Staviski Cup		6th		5th							
Dragon Trophy				2nd		1st	2nd				
Egna Spring Trophy	5th		7th		5th						
Master's de Patinage			5th	6th	10th	5th	4th		8th	4th	
Merano Ice Trophy								5th	7th		
NRW Trophy									4th		8th
Open d'Andorra							1st				
Santa Claus Cup							1st		2nd		
Skate to Milano										6th	
Slovenia Open		8th									
Sofia Trophy					2nd	2nd					
Swiss Open								1st			
Tallink Hotels Cup				7th						3rd	
Tayside Trophy						6th					
Trophée Métropole Nice						3rd	3rd	5th		3rd	
Volvo Open Cup			9th	11th							

Competition placements at senior level
Season	2015–16	2016–17	2017–18
World Junior Championships		43rd	32nd
French Championships		5th	5th
JGP Austria	24th		
JGP Croatia			12th
JGP France		22nd	
JGP Italy			20th
JGP Slovenia		22nd	
JGP Spain	24th		
Mentor Toruń Cup	9th		
Merano Cup		11th	

== Detailed results ==
ISU personal best scores in the +5/-5 GOE System
Segment	Type	Score	Event
Total	TSS	216.12	2025 Skate to Milano
Short program	TSS	73.56	2025 Skate to Milano
Short program	TES	37.36	2025 Skate to Milano
Short program	PCS	36.20	2025 Skate to Milano
Free skating	TSS	142.56	2025 Skate to Milano
Free skating	TES	69.19	2025 Skate to Milano
Free skating	PCS	73.92	2022 CS Ice Challenge

Results in the 2024–25 season
Date	Event	SP		FS		Total	
Date	Event	P	Score	P	Score	P	Score
Sep 26–28, 2024	(France) 2024 Master's de Patinage	8	60.94	8	100.20	8	161.14
Oct 16–20, 2024	(France) 2024 CS Trophée Métropole Nice Côte d'Azur	11	68.02	18	108.30	17	176.32
Nov 13–17, 2024	(Germany) 2024 NRW Trophy	5	61.91	4	115.42	4	177.33
Nov 27 – Dec 2, 2025	(Hungary) 2024 Santa Claus Cup	1	74.20	3	129.58	2	203.78
Dec 4–7, 2024	(Croatia) 2024 CS Golden Spin of Zagreb	11	68.27	12	111.31	12	179.58
Dec 20–21, 2024	(France) 2025 French Championships	7	64.34	10	121.79	9	186.13
Jan 20-26, 2025	(Germany) 2025 Bavarian Open	4	71.91	9	112.14	7	184.05
Jan 28 – Feb 2, 2025	(Estonia) 2025 European Championships	25	63.81	—N/a	—N/a	25	63.81
Feb 13–16, 2025	(Italy) 2025 Merano Ice Trophy	9	62.90	8	122.40	7	185.30
Mar 24–30, 2025	(United States) 2025 World Championships	39	47.90	—N/a	—N/a	39	47.90

Results in the 2025–26 season
Date	Event	SP		FS		Total	
Date	Event	P	Score	P	Score	P	Score
Aug 28–30, 2025	(France) 2025 Master's de Patinage	3	81.84	4	128.97	4	210.81
Sep 18–21, 2025	(China) 2025 Skate to Milano	5	73.56	5	142.56	6	216.12
Oct 1–5, 2025	(France) 2025 Trophée Métropole Nice Côte d'Azur	4	63.61	4	119.99	4	183.60
Nov 13–16, 2025	(Austria) 2025 Cup of Innsbruck	1	76.88	1	134.62	1	211.30
Nov 25–30, 2025	(Estonia) 2025 CS Tallinn Trophy	12	64.37	13	121.22	14	185.59
Dec 3–6, 2025	(Croatia) 2025 CS Golden Spin of Zagreb	15	66.99	15	122.81	16	189.80
Jan 13–18, 2026	(United Kingdom) 2026 European Championships	21	65.28	18	127.59	20	192.87
Feb 19-22, 2026	(Estonia) 2026 Tallink Hotels Cup	3	67.19	3	132.64	3	199.83

Results in the 2026–27 season
Date	Event	SP		FS		Total	
Date	Event	P	Score	P	Score	P	Score
Oct 15–18, 2026	(Hungary) 2026 CS Budapest Trophy	22	58.20	14	117.85	16	176.05
Nov 12–15, 2026	(Germany) 2026 NRW Trophy	10	59.74	8	118.36	8	178.10
