= Annette Dytrt =

German figure skater

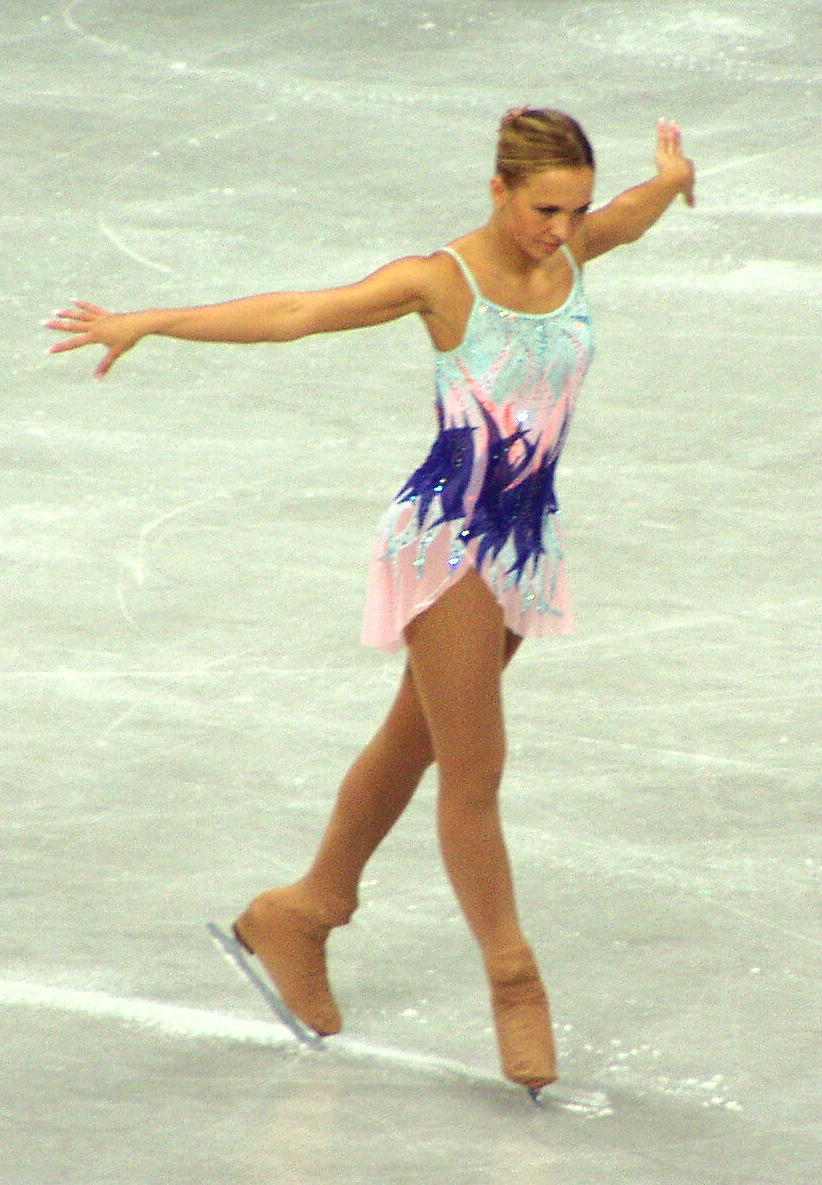
- Dytrt at the 2004 World Championships

Personal information
- Other names: Annette Dytrtová
- Born: 7 September 1983 (age 43) Landshut, West Germany
- Height: 1.56 m (5 ft 1 in)

Figure skating career
- Country: Germany
- Coach: Michael Huth, Karel Fajfr, Ilona Schindler, Shanetta Folle, Alexander Vedenin, Vlasta Kopřivová, Steffi Ruttkies
- Skating club: EC Oberstdorf
- Began skating: 1985
- Retired: 19 May 2011

Medal record
Representing Czech Republic
Czech Championships
| Gold medal – first place | 1999 Karviná | Singles |

Annette Dytrt, also Dytrtová (born 7 September 1983), is a German former competitive figure skater who also competed internationally for the Czech Republic. She is the 1999 Czech national champion and the 2003–06 German national champion.

== Personal life ==
Annette Dytrt was born in Landshut, Germany, the daughter of Czech immigrants. She moved to the Czech Republic with her elder sister, Veronika Dytrt, in 2001 but returned to Germany after a year and a half.

== Career ==
She won the 1999 Czech National Championships under the name Annette Dytrtová.

Dytrt won gold at the German National Figure Skating Championships between 2003 and 2006 and made numerous appearances at the European and World Figure Skating Championships.

In spring 2006, Dytrt tried pair skating with skating partner Norman Jeschke but their partnership was brief and they never competed together in international competition. Dytrt skated in the TV show "Stars auf Eis", a German version of Dancing on Ice, and then returned to competition as a single skater. She was coached by Michael Huth in Oberstdorf.

On 19 May 2011, Dytrt declared her retirement from competitive skating, following the sudden death of a family member.

Since 2013, Dytrt collaborates with Yannick Bonheur in ice shows as an adagio skater.

== Programs ==
| Season | Short program | Free skating |
|---|---|---|
| 2009–10 | O mio babbino caro by Giacomo Puccini performed by David Garrett | Forrest Gump by Alan Silvestri |
| 2008–09 | The Feeling Begins (from The Last Temptation of Christ) by Peter Gabriel | The Swan by Camille Saint-Saëns |
| 2007–08 | The Feeling Begins (from The Last Temptation of Christ) by Peter Gabriel | Scheherazade by Nikolai Rimsky-Korsakov |
| 2005–06 | Toccata and Fugue in D Minor by Johann Sebastian Bach | Spartacus by Aram Khachaturian |
| 2004–05 | Danse macabre by Camille Saint-Saëns | Spartacus by Aram Khachaturian |
| 2003–04 | Danse macabre by Camille Saint-Saëns | Music by Michel |
| 2002–03 | Violin Concerto by Felix Mendelssohn | The Phantom of the Opera by Andrew Lloyd Webber Symphonic Orchestra London |
| 2001–02 | Music by Mendelssohn | Dragon: The Bruce Lee Story by Randy Edelman |

== Competitive highlights ==
GP: Grand Prix; JGP: Junior Grand Prix (1997–98 season: Junior Series)

International
| Event | 96–97 (GER) | 97–98 (GER) | 98–99 (CZE) | 99–00 (CZE) | 00–01 (GER) | 01–02 (GER) | 02–03 (GER) | 03–04 (GER) | 04–05 (GER) | 05–06 (GER) | 07–08 (GER) | 08–09 (GER) | 09–10 (GER) |
|---|---|---|---|---|---|---|---|---|---|---|---|---|---|
| World Champ. | | | | | | | | 21st | 15th | 24th | 12th | 18th | |
| European Champ. | | | | | | | 21st | 11th | 12th | 10th | 12th | 7th | |
| GP Bofrost Cup | | | | | | | 11th | | | | | | |
| GP Cup of Russia | | | | | | | | | 5th | | | | 11th |
| GP Lalique/Bompard | | | | | | | | 7th | 6th | 7th | | | |
| GP NHK Trophy | | | | | | | | | | 8th | | 10th | 8th |
| GP Skate America | | | | | | | | | | | | 10th | |
| Ice Challenge | | | | | | | | | | | | | 6th |
| Crystal Skate | | | | | | | | | | | | | 10th |
| Finlandia Trophy | | | | | | | 6th | 7th | 12th | | 10th | | |
| Golden Spin | | | | | | | | | | | 6th | | 6th |
| Nebelhorn Trophy | | | 17th | | | | | | | 8th | 4th | 8th | |
| Nepela Memorial | | | | 7th | | | | | | | | | |
| Schäfer Memorial | | | | | | | | | | | | 3rd | |
| Tallinn Cup | | | | 6th | | | | | | | | | |
International: Junior
| World Junior Champ. | | | 18th | | | | | | | | | | |
| JGP Bulgaria | | 9th | | | | | | | | | | | |
| JGP Czech Rep. | | | | 9th | | | | | | | | | |
| JGP France | | | 14th | | | | | | | | | | |
| JGP Hungary | | 3rd | 10th | | | | | | | | | | |
| JGP Norway | | | | 10th | | | | | | | | | |
National
| German Champ. | 6th | 4th | | | 11th | 4th | 1st | 1st | 1st | 1st | 3rd | 1st | |
| Czech Champ. | | | 1st | | | | | | | | | | |
Dytrt did not compete internationally in the 2006–07 season
