= Michael Huth =

German figure skater and coach (born 1969)

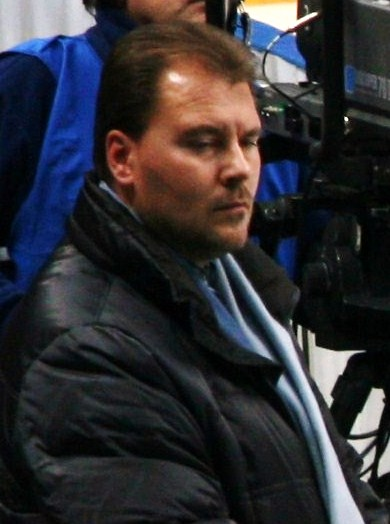
- Huth in 2010.

Personal information
- Born: 2 September 1969 (age 56) Dresden, East Germany

Figure skating career
- Country: East Germany
- Skating club: Sportclub Einheit Dresden
- Retired: 1988

Michael Huth (born 2 September 1969) is a German figure skating coach and former competitor for East Germany.

== Competitive career ==
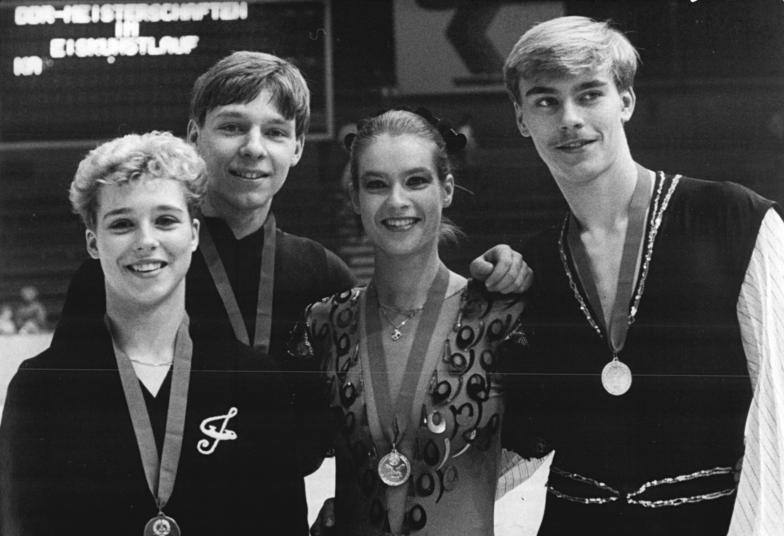
Huth (right) with Katarina Witt, Peggy Schwarz / Alexander König in 1987.

During his competitive career, Huth represented East Germany. He was the 1988 East German national champion and competed at the 1988 Winter Olympics in Calgary, where he placed 23rd.

International
Event	1987–1988
Winter Olympics	23rd
European Championships	17th
National
East German Championships	1st

== Coaching ==
Following his retirement from competitive skating, Huth studied sports science and turned to coaching. He coaches in Oberstdorf. His current and former students include

- (Switzerland) Anastasia Brandenburg
- (Switzerland) Lukas Britschgi (European champion)
- (Germany) Annette Dytrt
- (Finland) Liubov Efimenko
- (Germany) Kai Jagoda
- (Italy) Carolina Kostner (World, European, and 2014 Olympic bronze medalist)
- (Ukraine) Anton Kovalevski
- (Monaco) Davide Lewton Brain
- (Norway) Sondre Oddvoll Bøe
- (Switzerland) Alexia Paganini
- (Switzerland) Kimmy Repond
- (Italy) Ivan Righini
- (Finland) Jenni Saarinen
- (Germany) Nicole Schott
- (France) Léa Serna
- (Germany) Silvio Smalun
- (Germany) Susanne Stadlmüller
- (Germany) Jennifer Urban
- (Czech Republic) Tomáš Verner (European champion)
- (Finland) Valter Virtanen
- (Germany) Kristin Wieczorek
- (Poland) Kornel Witkowski

Huth and his wife organize IceDome, an annual summer training camp in Oberstdorf. 140 skaters from 20 countries took part in 2011.

== Personal life ==
Huth has two children with his wife, Claudia.
