= Meredi =

Ina Meredi Arakelian
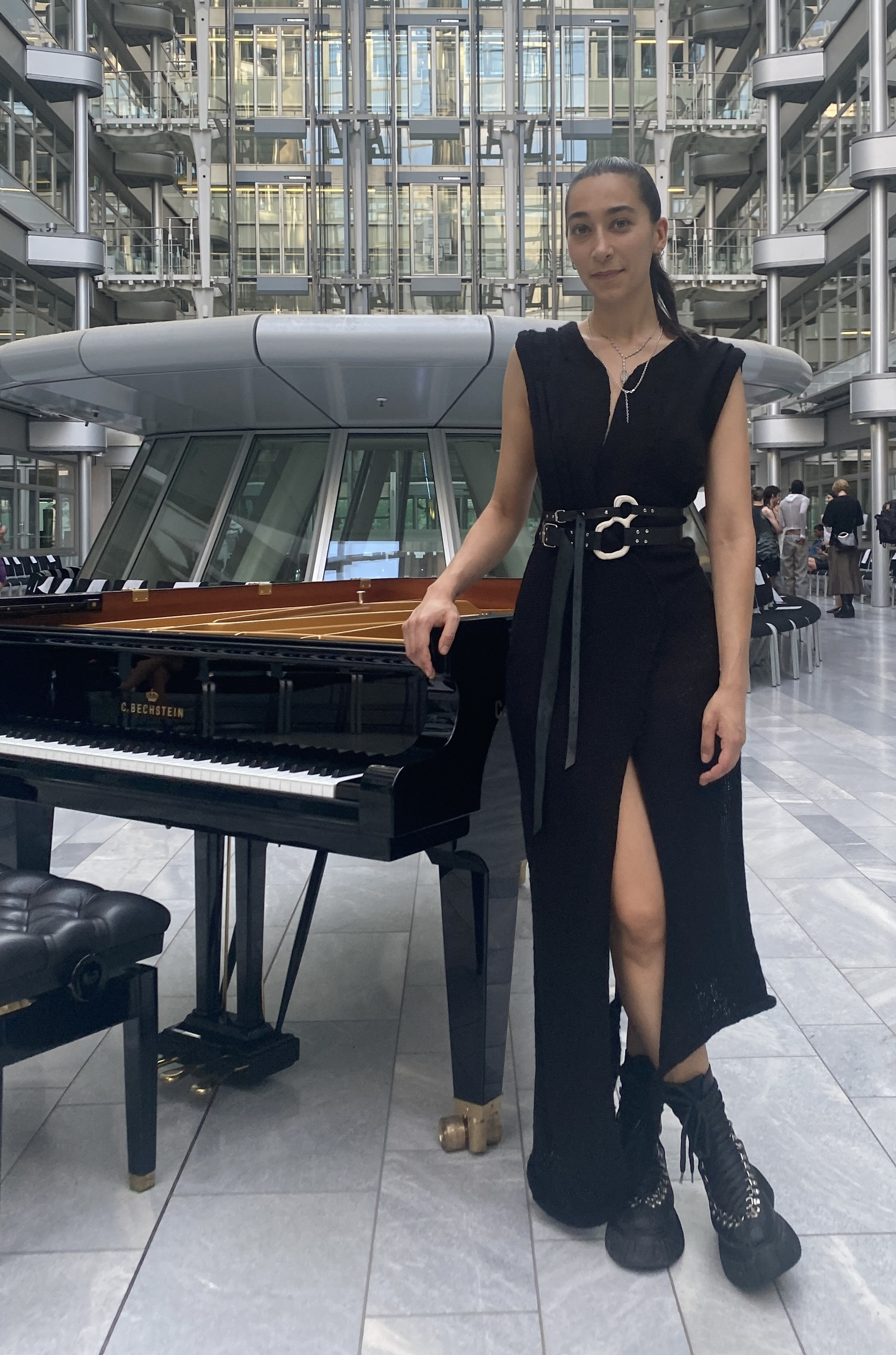

Background information
- Born: Berlin, Germany
- Occupations: Composer, Pianist
- Instrument: Piano
- Labels: Deutsche Grammophon, Modern Recordings
- Website: https://www.meredi.de/

Meredi, also known under her full name Ina Meredi Arakelian, is a German-Armenian composer and pianist based in Berlin and Los Angeles.

== Early life and education ==
Born in Berlin in 1992, Meredi started piano lessons at the age of six, after she had started playing on an old piano in her family home at an early age. She continued her musical education at a performing arts school in the German capital, while studying composition at the Hanns Eisler Conservatory and Berlin University of the Arts in conjunction. She then specialized in composition for film and media at the Munich Conservatory.

== Career ==
Meredi's debut record Stardust was released on BMG’s Modern Recordings in 2020, and was named one of BBC Music Magazine’s Top 10 post-classical albums that year. Stardust was followed by the ambient album Trance (2021) and Some Other Place (2022), a solo piano reimagining of Trance.

In 2022, Meredi composed White Flowers Take Their Bath for Mari Samuelsen’s album LYS (Deutsche Grammophon) – a track which has since garnered over 9 million global streams.

In June 2024, Deutsche Grammophon announced the signing of an exclusive agreement with Meredi, as well as her first release on the label later that month.

== Discography ==
Studio albums

- Stardust (2020, Modern Recordings)
- Stardust (Exit Earth) (2021, Modern Recordings)
- Trance (2021, Modern Recordings)
- Some Other Place (2022, Modern Recordings)

EP

- Flourish (2024, Deutsche Grammophon)

== Filmography ==
Year	Film / Series	Director	Credits
2022	Flügel aus Beton	Lea Becker	Composer
2023	Tatort: Hochamt für Toni	Michael Krummenacher	Composer
2023	Wade in the Water: A Journey into Black Surfing and Aquatic Culture	David Mesfin	Composer
2023	Metal Battle Girl	Andreas Wolff	Composer
2023-2024	Helen Dorn	Friedemann Fromm	Composer
2024	Spreewaldkrimi	Jan Fehse	Composer
