= Mari Samuelsen =

Norwegian violinist (born 1984)

Mari Silje Samuelsen
- Born: 21 December 1984 (age 40)
- Occupation: Violinist
- Instrument: Violin
- Website: marisamuelsen.com

Mari Silje Samuelsen (born 21 December 1984) is a Norwegian violinist.

== Early life and education ==
Samuelsen grew up in Hamar, and began playing violin at age three at a local music school outside the city. By age four, she became a student of violinist Arve Tellefsen, who called Mari and her brother Håkon Samuelsen "among the greatest string music talents in Norway". She studied with Tellefsen in Oslo, and played with him for almost 10 years.

Samuelsen later studied at the Barratt Due Institute of Music in Oslo under the tutelage of violinist Stephan Barratt-Due. For the last ten years, she has been a student of the Russian professor and violinist Zakhar Bron. She earned two master's degrees at Zurich University of the Arts in Switzerland in 2012.

== Musical career ==
She has collaborated with such artists as Max Richter, Jeff Mills, and Dubfire. Max Richter said of Samuelsen: "Apart from being a wonderful violinist, Mari has an instinctive understanding of my compositional world and an uncanny ability to communicate my intentions". In 2014, Mari and Håkon performed the world premiere of Pas de Deux, a double concerto they commissioned James Horner to compose.

Samuelsen released her debut solo album, Mari, on 7 June 2019, via the label Deutsche Grammophon. It includes mostly modern and minimalist pieces, which she performs with Konzerthausorchester Berlin and conductor Jonathan Stockhammer. The album includes works from Max Richter, Johann Sebastian Bach, Brian Eno, and Philip Glass, among others. Her performance of Richter's composition "November" from Memoryhouse (2002) was released as a single before Mari was released.

== Discography ==
- 2015: Pas de Deux with Håkon Samuelsen
- 2017: Nordic Noir
- 2019: Mari (Deutsche Grammophon)
- 2022: LYS (Deutsche Grammophon)
- 2024: LIFE (Deutsche Grammophon)
