= Jonathan Stockhammer =

American conductor based in Germany (born 1969)

Jonathan Stockhammer (born December 21, 1969, in Hollywood, California) is an American conductor based in Germany.

== Career ==
Stockhammer studied Chinese and Political Science before devoting himself to his musical studies, receiving degrees in musical composition at the University of California, Los Angeles and conducting at the University of Southern California. He was a fellow at the Accademia Chigiana (1995/96) and at the Tanglewood Music Center (1999.) His mentors include Ian Krouse, Peter Eötvös, Daniel Lewis, Robert Spano, Jorma Panula, Myung-Whun Chung and Esa-Pekka Salonen.

Upon the completion of his studies, Stockhammer moved to Germany and began collaborations with numerous radio orchestras such as the Stuttgart Radio Symphony Orchestra, the WDR Symphony Orchestra Cologne, the Orchestre Philharmonique de Radio France, Netherlands Radio Chamber Philharmonic, as well as the Oslo Philharmonic, Orchestre National de France., the Tokyo Metropolitan Symphony Orchestra, the Sydney Symphony Orchestra, the Essen Philharmonic, the Czech Philharmonic, the Deutsche Kammerphilharmonie Bremen and the Ensemble Resonanz. He has regularly led opera productions at the Opéra National de Lyon. In 2013, Stockhammer conducted the New York City Opera's production of Thomas Ades’ opera Powder Her Face, a collaboration with stage-director Jay Scheib.

In the area of new music, Stockhammer has collaborated extensively with the Ensemble Modern, musikFabrik and as conductor in residence with the Collegium Novum Zürich (since 2013/14). Since moving to Germany in 1998, Stockhammer has led a large number of world premieres including works by Wolfgang Rihm, Pascal Dusapin, Hans Abrahamsen, Heiner Goebbels, Chaya Czernowin, Philip Glass and Brian Ferneyhough He has performed at new music festivals such as the Donaueschingen Festival, the Ultraschall Berlin, as well as Venice Biennale, the Schwetzingen Festival and the Salzburg Festival. A large part of Stockhammer's work is productions which defy classification such as his recordings and performances of Frank Zappa’s music, his collaboration with the Jazz-Duo Chick Corea and Gary Burton, or with the percussionist Peter Erskine, with the Pet Shop Boys, the slam-poet Saul Williams or the Swedish Saxophonist/Composer Mats Gustafsson.

== Discography ==
- Thierry Pécou: Symphonie du Jaguar, Vague de Pierre . Harmonia Mundi. (2010) (Diapason d’or and Grand Prix du Disque / Académie Charles Cros, 2010)
- Wolfgang Rihm: Symphony Nos.1 and 2, Nachtwach, Vers une symphonie fleuve III, Raumage. Hänssler. (2008)
- Chick Corea & Gary Burton: The New Chrystal Silence. Concord/Universal Music Group. (2007) (Grammy 2009)
- Pascal Dusapin: Faustus, the Last Night. (2007) (Victoire de la Musique 2007, Prix Choc, Prix François Reichenbach)
- Marcus Hechtle: Screen, Sätze mit Pausen, Klage, Blinder Fleck, Still. (2007)
- Enno Poppe: Interzone. Kairos. (2006)
- Neil Tennant/Chris Lowe: The Battleship Potemkin. Parlophone. (2005)
- Frank Zappa: Greggery Peccary and other Persuasions. Rca Red Seal (Sony Music). (2003) (Echo Klassik 2004)
- Ensemble Modern: Mit Werken aus dem Nachwuchsforum der Gesellschaft für Neue Musik. Wergo/Schott Music.(2001)

== Awards ==
▪ Kirill Kondrashin Award 1996 ▪ Accedemia Chigiana Merit Prize 1996 ▪ ECHO Klassik, 2004 ▪ Victoire de la Musique und Le Choc / Monde de la Musique, 2007 ▪ Grammy Award, 2009 ▪ Diapason d’or and Grand Prix du Disque / Académie Charles Cros, 2010
