= 2025–26 national figure skating championships =

- Type: National championship
- Season: 2025–26
- Host: ISU member nations
- Previous: 2024–25
- Next: 2026–27

National figure skating championships for the 2025–26 season began on July 1, 2025, and ended on June 30, 2026. Most competitions took place from December 2025 to January 2026. They were held to crown national champions and to serve as part of the selection process for international events, such as the 2025 ISU Championships and 2026 Winter Olympics. Medals were awarded in the disciplines of men's singles, women's singles, pairs, and ice dance. Several countries choose to organize their national championships together with their neighbors; the results were subsequently divided into national podiums.

== National competitions ==
Code key
S – Senior event	J – Junior event	N – Novice event	M – Men's singles	W – Women's singles	P – Pair skating	D – Ice dance

Color key

- National championships
- Other domestic competition

2025
Dates	Event	Type	Level	Disc.	Location	Ref.
July 18–20	U.S. Collegiate Championships	Other	S/J	M/W/D	Flossmoor, Illinois, United States	
August 12–13	Malaysian Championships	Nationals	All	M/W	Sepang, Selangor, Malaysia	
August 28–30	Master's de Patinage	Other	S	All	Villard-de-Lans, France	
September 2–3	Argentine Championships	Nationals			Buenos Aires, Argentina	
September 27–28	Chinese Taipei Championships	Nationals	All	M/W	Taipei, Taiwan	
October 4–7	New Zealand Championships	Nationals	All	M/W	Auckland, New Zealand	
October 17–19	Japan Novice Championships	Nationals	N	M/W/D	Yokohama, Kanagawa, Japan	
October 17–19	Vietnamese Championships	Nationals			Hanoi, Vietnam	
November 2–6	Pacific Coast Sectional Final	Other	All	M/W/D	Henderson, Nevada, United States	
November 6–8	Philippine Championships	Nationals	All	M/W	Pasay, Philippines	
November 10–16	Eastern Sectional Final	Other	All	M/W	Charleston, South Carolina, United States	
November 17–21	Midwestern Sectional Final	Other	All	M/W/P	East Lansing, Michigan, United States	
November 21–22	Belgian Championships	Nationals	All	M/W	Deurne, Belgium	
November 22–24	Japan Junior Championships	Nationals	J	M/W	Kōtō, Tokyo, Japan	
November 25–30	British Championships	Nationals	All	All	Sheffield, England, United Kingdom	
November 27–30	Skate Canada Challenge	Other	S/J	All	Calgary, Alberta, Canada	
November 28 – December 5	Australian Championships	Nationals	All	M/W/D	Boondall, Queensland, Australia	
November 28–30	Icelandic Championships	Nationals	All	W/P	Reykjavík, Iceland	
November 29–30	Serbian Championships	Nationals			Belgrade, Serbia	
December 4–6	Brazilian Championships	Nationals	All	M/W	São Paulo, Brazil	
December 5–7	Danish Championships	Nationals	All	M/W/D	Copenhagen, Denmark	
December 5–7	Norwegian Championships	Nationals	All	M/W	Bergen, Norway	
December 6–7	Latvian Championships	Nationals	All	M/W/D	Riga, Latvia	
December 6–7	Romanian Championships	Nationals	S	W	Székesfehérvár, Hungary	
December 8–13	German Championships	Nationals	All	All	Oberstdorf, Germany	
December 10–11	Israeli Championships	Nationals	All	M/W/D	Holon, Israel	
December 10–13	Austrian Championships	Nationals	All	All	Innsbruck, Austria	
December 11–13	Four Nationals Championships (Czech/Hungarian/Polish/Slovak)	Nationals	S/J	All	Prešov, Slovakia	
December 11–14	Spanish Championships	Nationals	All	All	Jaca, Spain	
December 11–14	Swedish Championships	Nationals	All	M/W/D	Landskrona, Sweden	
December 12–13	Armenian Championships	Nationals	All	M/W/P	Yerevan, Armenia	
December 12–14	Chinese Junior Championships	Nationals	J	All	Jilin City, China	
December 12–14	Finnish Championships	Nationals	S/J	M/W/D	Lahti, Finland	
December 12–15	Kazakh Championships	Nationals	S/J	M/W/D	Pavlodar, Kazakhstan	
December 13–14	Estonian Championships	Nationals	S	M/W	Tallinn, Estonia	
December 13–14	Lithuanian Championships	Nationals	All	M/W	Kaunas, Lithuania	
December 13–14	Slovenian Championships	Nationals	All	M/W/D	Jesenice, Slovenia	
December 13–14	Peruvian Championships	Nationals	J	W	Lima, Peru	
December 17–22	Russian Championships	Nationals	S	All	Saint Petersburg, Russia	
December 18–20	French Championships	Nationals	S/J	All	Briançon, France	
December 18–21	Bulgarian Championships	Nationals	All	M/W	Sofia, Bulgaria	
December 18–21	Italian Championships	Nationals	S/J	All	Bergamo, Italy	
December 18–21	Japan Championships	Nationals	S/J	All	Shibuya, Tokyo, Japan	
December 19–21	Swiss Championships	Nationals	S/J	All	Lugano, Switzerland	
December 19–21	Turkish Championships	Nationals	All	M/W	Kocaeli, Turkey	
December 20–21	Croatian Championships	Nationals	All	M/W	Zagreb, Croatia	
December 25–28	Chinese Championships	Nationals	S	All	Harbin, China	

2026
Dates	Event	Type	Level	Disc.	Location	Ref.
January 3–6	South Korean Championships	Nationals	S/J	M/W/D	Seoul, South Korea	
January 4–11	U.S. Championships	Nationals	S/J	All	St. Louis, Missouri, United States	
January 5–11	Canadian Championships	Nationals	S/J	All	Gatineau, Quebec, Canada	
January 9–10	Polish Junior Championships	Nationals	J	M/W	Warsaw, Poland	
January 14–18	Romanian Championships	Nationals	J	M/W	Otopeni, Romania	
January 17	Egyptian Championships	Nationals	J	W	Cairo, Egypt	
January 19-20	Belarusian Junior Championships	Nationals	J	M/W/D	Minsk, Belarus	
January 21-24	Belarusian Championships	Nationals	S	M/W/D	Minsk, Belarus	
January 22–25	Dutch Championships	Nationals	All	M/W/D	Tilburg, Netherlands	
January 31 – February 1	Czech Junior Championships	Nationals	J/N	M/W/D	České Budějovice, Czech Republic	
January 31 – February 1	Estonian Junior Championships	Nationals	J/N	All	Tallinn, Estonia	
January 31 – February 1	Hungarian Junior Championships	Nationals	J/N	M/W/D	Budapest, Hungary	
February 4–8	Russian Junior Championships	Nationals	J	All	Saransk, Russia	
February 14–15	Swiss Novice Championships	Nationals	N	M/W	Rapperswil-Jona, Switzerland	
March 6–7	North Macedonian Championships	Nationals	J/N	W	Skopje, Macedonia	
March 6–9	Russian Grand Prix Final	Other	S	All	Chelyabinsk, Russia	
March 13–15	Luxembourgish Championships	Nationals	J	W	Roeser, Luxembourg	
March 14–15	Slovak Junior Championships	Nationals	J/N	M/W	Humenné, Slovakia	
March 17–21	Ukrainian Junior Championships	Nationals	J/N	M/W/D	Bohuslav, Ukraine	
April 8–11	Ukrainian Championships	Nationals	S	M/W/P	Bohuslav, Ukraine	
April 9–12	Thai Championships	Nationals	All	M/W	Bangkok, Thailand	
April 12	Portuguese Championships	Nationals	S	M	Penhas da Saúde, Portugal	
April 27–29	Indonesian Championships	Nationals	All	M/W	Jakarta, Indonesia	
May 2	Andorran Championships	Nationals	All	M/W	Canillo, Andorra	
May 10–12	South African Championships	Nationals	All	M/W	Cape Town, South Africa	
May 18–24	Mexican Championships	Nationals	All	M/W	Cancún, Mexico	

== Senior medalists ==
=== Men's singles ===
Championships	Gold	Silver	Bronze	Ref.
Australia	Julio Potapenko	Douglas Gerber	Charlton Doherty	
Brazil	Arthur Alcorte	Diogo Vini	No other competitors	
Armenia	Semen Daniliants	No other competitors		
Austria	Maurizio Zandron	Tobia Oellerer	Anton Skoficz	
Belarus	Vasilij Borohovskij	Georgij Kozlovskij	Evgenij Puzanov	
Bulgaria	Alexander Zlatkov	Filip Kaymakchiev	Larry Loupolover	
Canada	Stephen Gogolev	Roman Sadovsky	Aleksa Rakic	
China	Jin Boyang	Chen Yudong	Peng Zhiming	
Croatia	Jari Kessler	No other competitors		
Czech Republic	Georgii Reshtenko	Tadeáš Vaclavík	Jan Valtera	
Estonia	Aleksandr Selevko	Mihhail Selevko	Arlet Levandi	
Finland	Matias Lindfors	Makar Suntsev	Valtter Virtanen	
France	Kévin Aymoz	Adam Siao Him Fa	Luc Economides	
Germany	Genrikh Gartung	Nikita Starostin	Kai Jagoda	
(United Kingdom) Great Britain	Edward Appleby	Tao Macrae	Lucas Fitterer	
Hungary	Aleksei Vlasenko	No other competitors		
Israel	Tamir Kuperman	No other competitors		
Italy	Daniel Grassl	Matteo Rizzo	Corey Circelli	
Japan	Yuma Kagiyama	Shun Sato	Kao Miura	
Kazakhstan	Oleg Melnikov	Dias Jirenbayev	Nikita Krivosheyev	
Latvia	Fedir Kulish	Kirills Korkacs	No other competitors	
Lithuania	Daniel Korabelnik	No other competitors		
Malaysia	Fang Ze Zeng	Low Chun Hong	Jayden Ye Hung Tin	
Mexico	Donovan Carrillo	No other competitors		
New Zealand	Li Yanhao	No other competitors		
Philippines	Paolo Borromeo	Brandon James Baldoz	No other competitors	
Poland	Vladimir Samoilov	Matvii Yefymenko	Jakub Lofek	
Portugal	Diogo António Cunha Craveiro	No other competitors		
Russia	Petr Gumennik	Evgeni Semenenko	Mark Kondratiuk	
Slovakia	Adam Hagara	Jozef Čurma	No other competitors	
Slovenia	David Sedej	No other competitors		
South Africa	Cody Kock	Sinali Sango	No other competitors	
South Korea	Cha Jun-hwan	Seo Min-kyu	Choi Ha-bin	
Spain	Tomàs-Llorenç Guarino Sabaté	Pablo Garcia	Euken Alberdi	
Sweden	Andreas Nordebäck	Casper Johansson	Hugo Bostedt	
Switzerland	Lukas Britschgi	Ean Weiler	Georgiia Pavlov	
Turkey	Alp Eren Ozkan	Burak Demirboga	Enes Demirci	
Ukraine	Kyrylo Marsak	Ivan Shmuratko	Vadym Novikov	
United States	Ilia Malinin	Andrew Torgashev	Maxim Naumov	

=== Women's singles ===
Championships	Gold	Silver	Bronze	Ref.
Argentina	Sophia Dayan			
Australia	Sienna Kaczmarczyk	Victoria Alcantara	Simona Bhasin	
Austria	Olga Mikutina	Jasmin Elsebaie	Flora Marie Schaller	
Belarus	Viktoriia Safonova	Varvara Stahovich	Yaroslava Knyazeva	
Belgium	Nina Pinzarrone	No other competitors		
Bulgaria	Alexandra Feigin	Kristina Grigorova	Anastasia Yurchuk	
Canada	Madeline Schizas	Gabrielle Daleman	Minsol Kwon	
China	Jin Shuxian	Zhang Ruiyang	Zhu Yi	
Chinese Taipei	Pin-Jane Chen	No other competitors		
Croatia	Meri Marinac	Lorena Cizmek	Ema Vukovic	
Czech Republic	Barbora Vránková	Michaela Vrašťáková	Eliška Březinová	
Denmark	Anna-Flora Colmor Jepsen	Babeth Hansson-Östergaard	Selmasiri Bella Larsen	
Estonia	Niina Petrõkina	Nataly Langerbaur	Kristina Lisovskaja	
Finland	Iida Karhunen	Olivia Lisko	Linnea Ceder	
France	Stefania Gladki	Lorine Schild	Léa Serna	
Germany	Julia Grabowski	Sarah Marie Pesch	Kira Thurner	
(United Kingdom) Great Britain	Kristen Spours	Nina Povey	Emma Lyons	
Hungary	Léna Ekker	Katinka Zsembery	Vivien Papp	
Iceland	Lena Rut Ásgeirsdóttir	No other competitors		
Indonesia	Michelle Edgina Axille	Safia Nurdeta Aulia Andiko	Chilly Ann Sintana Wongso	
Israel	Mariia Seniuk	Maria Dmitrieva	Elizabet Gervits	
Italy	Lara Naki Gutmann	Sarina Joos	Ginevra Lavinia Negrello	
Japan	Kaori Sakamoto	Mao Shimada	Mone Chiba	
Kazakhstan	Amira Irmatova	Zere Sarbalina	Nurija Sulejmen	
Latvia	Nikola Fomchenkova	Ksenija Heimane	Emilija Ozola	
Lithuania	Meda Variakojytė	Jogailé Aglinskyte	No other competitors	
Malaysia	Audrey Lee	Afrina Diyanah	Oh Wei Xuan	
Mexico	Andrea Montesinos Cantú	Maria Velazquez Toscano	Alejandra Gabriela Osuna Tirado	
Netherlands	Niki Wories	Jolanda Vos	Saskia Oedejans	
New Zealand	Petra Lahti	Cordelia Shi	Mirika Armstrong	
Norway	Mia Risa Gomez	Linnea Kilsand	Kaia Kleven	
Philippines	Maxine Bautista	Cathryn Limketkai	Skye Frances Patenia	
Poland	Ekaterina Kurakova	Laura Szczesna	Weronika Ferlin	
Romania	Julia Sauter	Ana-Sofia Beschea	Teodora Maria Gheorghe	
Russia	Adeliia Petrosian	Alisa Dvoeglazova	Maria Zaharova	
Slovakia	Vanesa Šelmeková	Terézia Pócsová	Simona Koleňáková	
Slovenia	Julija Lovrencic	Nika Ozek Bela	Taisa Khan	
South Africa	Gian-Quen Isaacs	Keva Emond	Haley-Rae Thomson	
South Korea	Shin Ji-a	Kim Yu-seong	Huh Ji-yu	
Spain	Ariadna Gupta Espada	Nahia Olaizola Muguruza	Alexandra Martínez Carbó	
Sweden	Josefin Taljegård	Anita Östlund	Josefin Brovall	
Switzerland	Leandra Tzimpoukakis	Livia Kaiser	Anastasia Brandenburg	
Thailand	Phattaratida Kaneshige	Nutcha Doltanakarn	Supitsara Attawiboon	
Turkey	Salma Agamova	Selin Akbulut	Ceren Karas	
Ukraine	Sofiia Ekzarkhova	Taisiia Spesivtseva	Yelizaveta Babenko	
United States	Amber Glenn	Alysa Liu	Isabeau Levito	

=== Pairs ===
Championships	Gold	Silver	Bronze	Ref.
Armenia	Karina Akopova; Nikita Rakhmanin	No other competitors		
Austria	Gabriella Izzo; Luc Maierhofer	Sophia Schaller; Livio Mayr	No other competitors	
Canada	Lia Pereira; Trennt Michaud	Deanna Stellato-Dudek; Maxime Deschamps	Kelly Ann Laurin; Loucas Éthier	
China	Sui Wenjing; Han Cong	Guo Rui; Zhang Yiwen	Zhang Jiaxuan; Huang Yihang	
Czech Republic	Anna Valesi; Martin Bidař	No other competitors		
France	Camille Kovalev; Pavel Kovalev	Aurelie Faula; Theo Belle	Louise Ehrhard; Matthis Pellegris	
Germany	Minerva Fabienne Hase; Nikita Volodin	Annika Hocke; Robert Kunkel	Letizia Roscher; Luis Schuster	
(United Kingdom) Great Britain	Anastasia Vaipan-Law; Luke Digby	Rebecca Ritchie; Kyle McLeod	No other competitors	
Hungary	Maria Pavlova; Alexei Sviatchenko	No other competitors		
Iceland	Júlía Sylvía Gunnarsdóttir; Manuel Piazza	No other competitors		
Italy	Sara Conti; Niccolo Macii	Rebecca Ghilardi; Filippo Ambrosini	Irma Caldara; Riccardo Maglio	
Japan	Yuna Nagaoka; Sumitada Moriguchi	Ayumi Kagotani; Lucas Tsuyoshi Honda	No other competitors	
Poland	Ioulia Chtchetinina; Michał Woźniak	No other competitors		
Russia	Aleksandra Boikova; Dmitrii Kozlovskii	Anastasia Mishina; Aleksandr Galliamov	Ekaterina Chikmareva; Matvei Janchenkov	
Spain	Megan Yudin; Patrizio Romano Rossi Lopez	No other competitors		
Switzerland	Oxana Vouillamoz; Tom Bouvart	No other competitors		
Ukraine	Sofiia Holichenko; Artem Darenskyi	No other competitors		
United States	Alisa Efimova; Misha Mitrofanov	Ellie Kam; Danny O'Shea	Katie McBeath; Daniil Parkman	

=== Ice dance ===
Championships	Gold	Silver	Bronze	Ref.
Austria	Anita Straub; Andreas Straub	Corinna Huber; Patrik Huber	Kira Frisch; Nicholas Gambacini	
Belarus	Ekaterina Andreeva; Dmitrij Blinov	Karolina Krasovskaya; Egor Tratsevskij	No other competitors	
China	Wang Shiyue; Liu Xinyu	Ren Junfei; Xing Jianing	Xiao Zixi; He Linghao	
Czech Republic	Kateřina Mrázková; Daniel Mrázek	Natálie Taschlerová; Filip Taschler	No other competitors	
Netherlands	Chelsea Verhaegh; Sherim van Geffen	No other competitors		
Finland	Juulia Turkkila; Matthias Versluis	Yuka Orihara; Juho Pirinen	Daniela Ivanitskiy; Matthew Sperry	
France	Laurence Fournier Beaudry; Guillaume Cizeron	Evgeniia Lopareva; Geoffrey Brissaud	Loïcia Demougeot; Théo le Mercier	
Germany	Jennifer Janse van Rensburg; Benjamin Steffan	Charise Matthaei; Max Liebers	Karla Maria Karl; Kai Hoferichter	
(United Kingdom) Great Britain	Lilah Fear; Lewis Gibson	Phebe Bekker; James Hernandez	Sophia Bushell; Antonio Peña	
Hungary	Mariia Ignateva; Danijil Szemko	Emese Csiszer; Mark Shapiro	Lara Luft; Ilias Fourati	
Israel	Shira Ichilov; Michael Nosovitsky	No other competitors		
Italy	Charlène Guignard; Marco Fabbri	Victoria Manni; Carlo Röthlisberger	Noemi Tali; Noah Lafornara	
Japan	Utana Yoshida; Masaya Morita	Ikura Kushida; Koshiro Shimada	Ayano Sasaki; Yoshimitsu Ikeda	
Kazakhstan	Gaukhar Nauryzova; Boyisangur Datiev	No other competitors		
Poland	Sofia Dovhal; Wiktor Kulesza	Zofia Grzegorzewska; Oleg Muratov	Helena Carhart; Filip Bojanowski	
Russia	Alexandra Stepanova; Ivan Bukin	Vasilisa Kaganovskaya; Maxim Nekrasov	Elizaveta Pasechnik; Dario Cirisano	
South Korea	Hannah Lim; Ye Quan	No other competitors		
Spain	Olivia Smart; Tim Dieck	Sofia Val; Asaf Kazimov	Philomene Sabourin; Raul Bermejo	
Sweden	Milla Ruud Reitan; Nikolaj Majorov	No other competitors		
Switzerland	Gina Zehnder; Beda Leon Sieber	Arianna Sassi; Luca Morini	No other competitors	
United States	Madison Chock; Evan Bates	Emilea Zingas; Vadym Kolesnik	Christina Carreira; Anthony Ponomarenko	

== Junior medalists ==
=== Men's singles ===
Championships	Gold	Silver	Bronze	Ref.
Armenia	Mikhayel Salazaryan	No other competitors		
Australia	Vinceman Chong	Rahul Ravindran	Henry Green	
Austria	Maksym Petrychenko	Daniel Ruis	Ivan Siedykh	
Belarus	Pavel Gavdis	Prohor Prusakov	No other competitors	
Belgium	Denis Krouglov	Mohammed Aamara	No other competitors	
Brazil	João Vitor Cavalcanti	Lucaz Trindale Candria	No other competitors	
Bulgaria	Dean Mihaylov	Yoanis Apostou	Rosen Peev	
Canada	Parker Heiderich	William Chan	James Cha	
China	Zhao Qihan	Tian Tonghe	(Hong Kong) Li Jiarui	
Chinese Taipei	Wu Bo-Shun	No other competitors		
Czech Republic	Jakub Tykal	Tadeas Vaclavik	Jan Valtera	
Denmark	Wendell Hansson-Östergaard	Dimitri Steffensen	Sigurd Nikolaj Uhd Weldingh	
Estonia	Ilya Nesterov	No other competitors		
Finland	Anton Erkama	Matias Heinonen	Henri Moisio	
Germany	Soner Öztürk	Felix Zeng	Leon Rojkov	
(United Kingdom) Great Britain	Arin Yorke	Edward Solovyov	Lloyd Thomson	
Hungary	Aleksei Vlasenko	Benedek Pál Dózsa	No other competitors	
Indonesia	Rafif Herfianto Putra	Muhammad Dasha Akbar	No other competitors	
Israel	Kirill Sheiko	Nikita Sheiko	Matvey Sokolov	
Italy	Matteo Marchioni	Nikolay di Tria	Edoardo Luigi Profaizer	
Japan	Rio Nakata	Taiga Nishino	Daiya Ebihara	
Kazakhstan	Nikia Kozlov	Kenan Berdibaev	Dzhahongir Abylkasymov	
Latvia	Janis Znotinå	Nikolajs Krivoå Eja	Ratmirs Bekiå Bajevs	
Lithuania	Luka Imedashvili	Mantas Gryba	No other competitors	
Norway	Daniil Valanov	Henrik Grande-Brostrøm	No other competitors	
Poland	Matvii Yefymenko	Osca Oliver	Ryszard Suidek	
Romania	Razvan Cionac	No other competitors		
Spain	André Zapata	Arturo Alonso Fernández	David Escribano Salvador	
Slovakia	Dominik Drnzik	Niccolo Boeris	Villam Sabovcik	
Slovenia	Ziga Jevnik	No other competitors		
Sweden	Slbin Samuelsson	Tinm Nordin	Gabor Body	
Switzerland	Gion Schmid	Sandro de Angelo	No other competitors	
Thailand	Hiro Kaewtathip	Chawawit Jiamahasup	Tharon Warasittichai	
Turkey	Furkan Emre Incel	Mehmet Cenkay Karlikli	Ege Alacan	
Ukraine	Yehor Kurtsev	Fedir Babenko	Bohdan Pomohaibo	
United States	Patrick Blackwell	Caleb Farrington	Louis Mallane	

=== Women's singles ===
Championships	Gold	Silver	Bronze	Ref.
Armenia	Mariia Arutiunian	Izabella Esaian	Nadya Vardanyan	
Australia	Mia Zeng	Kalyn Shimogaki	Angela Guo	
Austria	Nathalie Yonemori	Hannah Frank	Eles Namazalieva	
Belarus	Varvara Stahovich	Mariya Evtuhuna	Yaroslava Knyazeva	
Belgium	Lilou Remeysen	Ilona van Steenberghe	Nena Bastianen	
Brazil	Elena Mills	Beatriz Dolbeth	No other competitors	
Bulgaria	Varvara Abramkina	Lia Lyubenova	Krista Georgieva	
Canada	Lia Cho	Victoria Barakhtina	Quinn Startek	
China	Wang Yihan	Jin Shuxian	Gao Shiqi	
Chinese Taipei	Tsai Yu-Feng	Lee Fang-Ning	Chen Chuang-Yuan	
Croatia	Paula Kasnar	Klara Cusak	Tara Plahutar	
Czech Republic	Jana Horcickova	Katerina Hanusova	Eliska Kubanova	
Denmark	Emilia Due Borch	Camilla Vinther Poulsen	Nikoline Ida Kristensen	
Egypt	Salma ElSakka	Sarah Abu ElSeoud	No other competitors	
Estonia	Maria Eliise Kaljuvere	Elina Goidina	Sofia Nekrassova	
Finland	Venla Sinisalo	Annika Pellonmaa	Saaga Volkova	
Germany	Anna Gerke	Diana Ziesecke	Adelina Voroteliak	
(United Kingdom) Great Britain	Alice Smith	Darya Dalgich	Lilian Musgrave	
Hungary	Polina Dzsumanyijazova	Zsófia Széplaki	Martina Petra Major	
Israel	Sophia Shiffrin	Simona Tkachman	Izabella Kirillova	
Italy	Beatrice Soldati	Zoe Mosca Barberis	Nicole de Rosa	
Japan	Mao Shimada	Mayuko Oka	Mei Okada	
Kazakhstan	Karina Sheina	Safija Abaeva	Maria Sannikova	
Latvia	Kira Baranovska	Paula Belevica	Natasha Jermolicka	
Lithuania	Milana Siniavskytė	Evelina Stavickytė	Agne Ivanovaite	
Luxembourg	Dita Giltaire	No other competitors		
Mexico	Camila Simone Arevalo arias	(Argentina) Stefania Soloveva	Victoria Sutton Hop	
Netherlands	Lucca Dijkhuizen	Roos Harkema	No other competitors	
Indonesia	Nathania Kinarizzah Insyirah	Candy Lieve Tilana Lim	Kayleen Evangelyn Setiawan	
North Macedonia	Isidora Isjanovski			
New Zealand	Renee Tsai	Nicca Wu	Cara Tang	
Norway	Perinlle With	Therese Kristine Håvåg	Margarita Kursite	
Philippines	Hayden Isabel Balucating	Isabella Miel Hazelton	Samantha Leyla Mascarinas	
Poland	Aleksandra Janikowska	Weronika Ferlin	Zofia Bochenek	
Romania	Adria Liliac	Andreea Cristiana Maria Lazar	Ana Stratulat	
Russia	Elena Kostyleva	Lidiya Pleskachyova	Victoria Streltsova	
Spain	Adriana Seguí	Noa Seguí	Daniela López Romero	
Slovakia	Alicia Lengyelova	Olivia Lengyelova	Lucia Jackova	
Slovenia	Ula Zadnikar	Zoja Kramar	Zola Grum	
South Africa	Ella Hawkes	Tindra Langa	Maria Navarro Brito	
Sweden	Nora Coppens	Alice Westling	Lilly Almgren-Lidman	
Switzerland	Valeriya Ezhova	Elisabeth Dibbern	Eugenia Sekulovski	
Thailand	Pimmpida Lerdpraiwan	Pasuree Marcella Tatirat	Angela Norin	
Turkey	Leyla Cetin	Deniz Tarim	Azra Saglam	
Ukraine	Sofiia Rymshyna	Khrystyna Haliareta	Oliviia Zherebko	
United States	Angela Shao	Annika Chao	Hannah Kim	

=== Pairs ===
Championships	Gold	Silver	Bronze	Ref.
Austria	Paola Jurisic; Michail Savenkov	No other competitors		
Canada	Julia Quattrochi; Étienne Lacasse	Brianna Dion; Jacob Cote	Rebecca Laiu; Marty Haubrich	
Czech Republic	Johanka Žilková; Matyáš Rafael Becerra	Debora Anna Cohen; Lukáš Vochozka	Alžběta Kvíderová; Jindřich Klement	
Germany	Anfisa Sevastianova; Lukas Gneiding	Sophie Krebs; Ilia Trofymov	Sonja Löwenherz; Hugo Willi Herrmann	
(United Kingdom) Great Britain	Neamh Davison; Daniel Borisov	Zarah Wood; Alex Lapsky	Wakana Katayama; Elliot Appleby	
Hungary	Lily Wilberforce; Mozes Jozsef Berei	No other competitors		
Italy	Irina Napolitano; Edoardo Comi	Polina Polman; Gabriel Renoldi	No other competitors	
Latvia	Alexandra Gubareva; Bruno Trukå Ans	No other competitors		
Spain	Anita Mapelli; Noah Quesada Grau	Inés Mouden Roca de Togores; Alejandro Lázaro García Melgares	No other competitors	
Switzerland	Laura Gauch; Linus Mager	No other competitors		
United States	Reagan Moss; Jakub Galbavy	Sofia Jarmoc; Luke Witkowski	Milada Kovar; Jared McPike	

=== Ice dance ===
Championships	Gold	Silver	Bronze	Ref.
Belarus	Viktoriya Plaskonnaya; Vladislav Sytsik	Ol'ga Grabovskaya; Yaroslav Systik	Varvara Ravgen'; Mihail Prusenkov	
Canada	Layla Veillon; Alexander Brandys	Summer Homick; Nicholas Buelow	Charlie Anderson; Cayden Dawson	
China	Yin Shanjie; Yang Shirui	Ding Xinai; Zheng Hanchong	Guo Yuxi; Ji Zhouhao	
Czech Republic	Diane Sznajder; Jáchym Novák	Eliška Žáková; Filip Mencl	Kristýna Štanclová; Karel Kostroň	
Estonia	Ksenia Šipunova; Miron Korjagin	No other competitors		
Finland	Eva Rozhnova; Platon Zobkov	Iris Lahti; Oskari Liedenpohja	Cilla Laine; Urho Reina	
France	Ambre Perrier Gianesini; Samuel Blanc Klaperman	Dania Mouaden; Theo Bigot	Lou Koch; Lucas Chataignoux	
Germany	Alexia Kruk; Jan Eisenhaber	Nelly Elisa Hemcke; Artyom Sladkov	Enikö Kobor; Zoard Kobor	
(United Kingdom) Great Britain	Ashlie Slatter; Louis Gregory	Annabel Mann; Jack Hammond	No other competitors	
Hungary	Villo Mira Silagyi; Istvan Jaracs	Aletta Lanyi; Huba Gallai	Diane Gallix; Elod Edyed-Zsigmond	
Israel	Julia Epps; Blake Gillman	No other competitors		
Italy	Arianna Soldati; Nicholas Tagliabue	Zoe Bianchi; Daniel Basile	Nelissa Cachova; Ivan Morozov	
Japan	Kaho Yamashita; Yuto Nagata	Ayumi Shibayama; Tomoki Kimura	Sumire Yoshida; Ibuki Ogawara	
Poland	Laura Balcerska; David Diadchenko	Yelyzaveta Lisova; Jakub Janicki	Zofia Gawron; Dawid Kaminski	
Slovakia	Lucia Štefanovová; Jacopo Boeris	No other competitors		
Spain	Laura Sundberg; Héctor González	Sara Marcilly; Jolan Engel	Sofia Pascual Mateos; Sergio Parra	
Sweden	Charlotte Chung; Axel Mackenzie	Anna Mackenzie; Wesley Lockwood	Rebecka Gamstedt; Filip Nilsson	
Switzerland	Seraina Tscharner; Laurin Wiederkehr	Leonie Woodtl; Timon Suhner	No other competitors	
Ukraine	Tetiana Bielodonova; Ivan Kachur	Polina Kapustina; Mykhailo Kliuiev	Veronika Kriuchkova; Denys Fediankin	
United States	Hana Maria Aboian; Daniil Veselukhin	Jasmine Robertson; Chase Rohner	Jane Calhoun; Mark Zheltyshev	
