= Michał Woźniak =

Polish pair skater (born 1999)

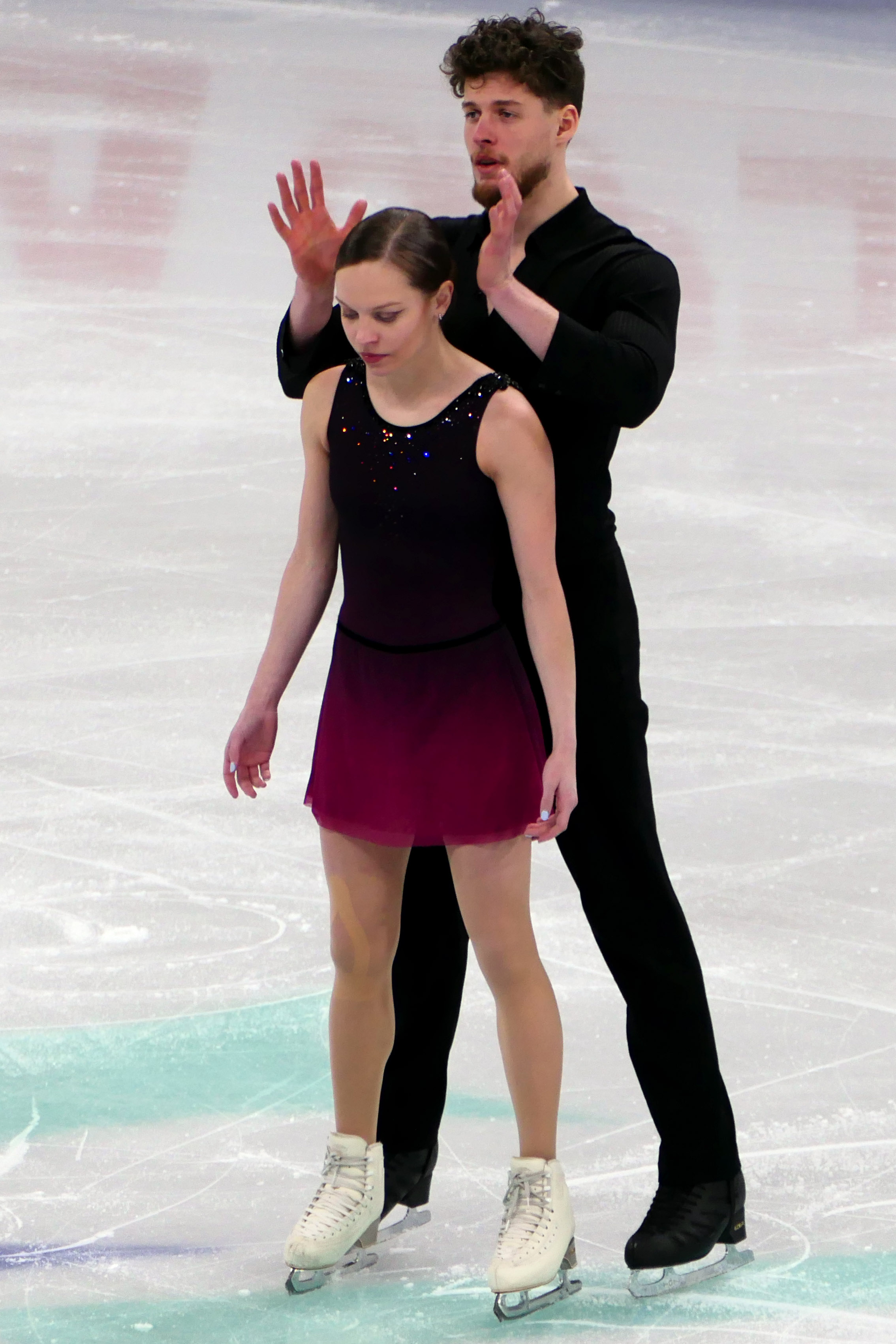
- Ioulia Chtchetinina and Michał Woźniak at the 2024 World Championships

Personal information
- Born: 1 July 1999 (age 27) Katowice, Poland
- Home town: Katowice
- Height: 1.82 m (6 ft 0 in)

Figure skating career
- Country: Poland
- Discipline: Pair skating (since 2020); Men's singles (2012–20)
- Partner: Ioulia Chtchetinina (2023–26); Anna Hernik (2020–22)
- Coach: Nolan Seegert; Dmitri Savin
- Skating club: UKŁ SPIN Katowice
- Began skating: 2005

Medal record
Polish Championships
Gold medal – first place	2022 Spišská Nová Ves	Pairs
Gold medal – first place	2024 Turnov	Pairs
Gold medal – first place	2025 Cieszyn	Pairs
Gold medal – first place	2026 Presov	Pairs

Michał Woźniak (born 1 July 1999) is a Polish pair skater.

With former partner, Ioulia Chtchetinina, he is the 2025 Four National champion, the 2024 Four National silver medalist, a three-time Polish national champion (2024–26), and the 2024 CS Golden Spin of Zagreb champion. The pair also represented Poland at the 2026 Winter Olympics.

With previous partner Anna Hernik, he is the 2022 Polish national champion.

Earlier in his career, Woźniak competed in men's singles. As a singles skater, he is the 2016 Polish junior national champion and competed at two ISU Junior Grand Prix events.

== Personal life ==
Woźniak was born on 1 July 1999 in Katowice, Poland. As of 2023, Woźniak is a law student at the University of Silesia in Katowice. In his free time, he enjoys reading and road cycling.

He married Polish singles skater, Elżbieta Gabryszak, in May 2024.

== Career ==
=== Early years and single skating career ===
Woźniak began learning how to skate in 2005. He trained as a single skater in Poland until 2019. While Woźniak never competed in the senior ranks internationally, he did receive a handful of junior international assignments over the course of his singles career, including two ISU Junior Grand Prix events. Notably, he won the Polish Junior Championships in 2016. Woźniak's coach, Iwona Mydlarz-Chruścińska, attempted to convince him to switch to a paired discipline — namely ice dance given his height and musicality — for several seasons before he ultimately chose to pursue pair skating.

=== 2020–21 and 2021–22 seasons: Partnership with Hernik ===
Woźniak teamed up with his first partner, Anna Hernik, in 2020, coached by Mateusz Chruściński. Both new to pair skating, the duo learned the basics of the discipline together, eventually building to throw triple jumps and a double twist. Hernik and Woźniak entered the 2021 Four Nationals Championships, the shared national championship event for the Czech Republic, Hungary, Poland, and Slovakia, but withdrew after the short program.

Hernik and Woźniak made their international debut at the 2021 Nebelhorn Trophy, the final qualifying event to the 2022 Winter Olympics. The couple finished last at the event, suffering an error during the free skate where Hernik fell head first out of a lift and onto the ice. While the team did eventually return for the 2022 Four Nationals Championships where they won the Polish national title, Hernik ultimately made the decision to conclude her competitive career.

=== Partnership with Chtchetinina ===
==== 2023–24 season: Debut of Woźniak/Chtchetinina ====
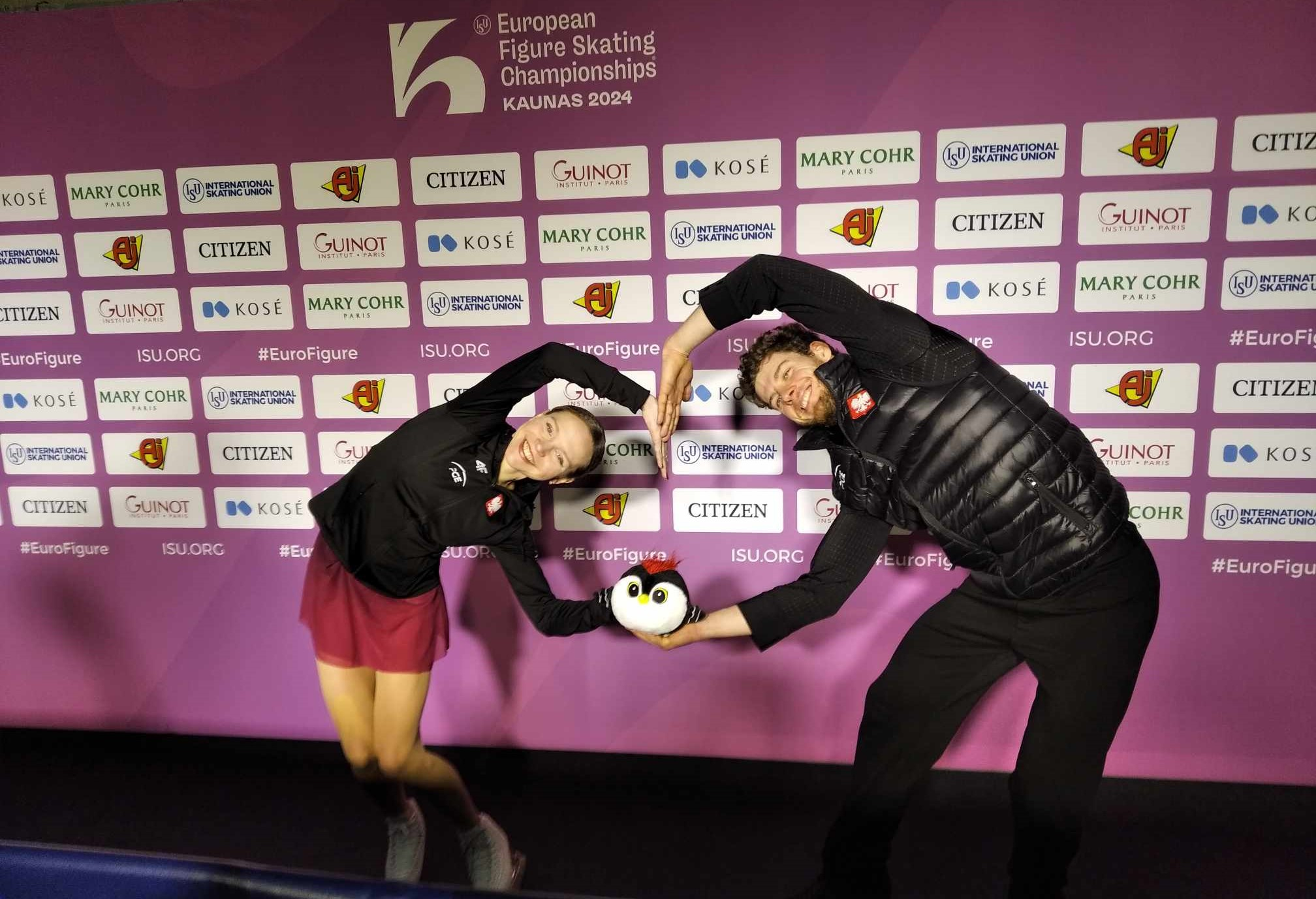
Ioulia Chtchetinina and Michał Woźniak at the 2024 European Championships

Woźniak faced challenges in finding a new skating partner following the conclusion of his collaboration with Hernik. His search was initially hindered by the COVID-19 pandemic and later by the 2022 Russian invasion of Ukraine. With limited options internationally, he decided to explore possibilities within his home country. However, tryouts with young skater Wiktoria Pacha and returning veteran Ola Malinkiewicz proved unsuccessful. Eventually, Woźniak connected with Swiss-Hungarian skater Ioulia Chtchetinina, who was in search of a new partner after parting ways with Márk Magyar, over Instagram. Despite differences in their levels of experience in the discipline, Chtchetinina agreed to a tryout, which took place in July 2023. The official announcement of their partnership for Poland came the following month. The pair ultimately decided to train in Berlin, Germany as due to the Russian invasion of Ukraine, Chtchetinina no longer wished to continue training in Russia as she previously had. While Nolan Seegert became the team's head coach, Chtchetinina's previous Russian coach, Dmitri Savin, continued working with her and Woźniak through video chat.

Chtchetinina and Woźniak made their international debut at the 2023 Budapest Trophy, where they finished fourth. They next competed at the 2023 Diamond Spin where they placed second between Italian teams Rebecca Ghilardi and Filippo Ambrosini and Anna Valesi and Manuel Piazza. The team claimed their second international medal not long after with a bronze at the 2023 Warsaw Cup behind Georgians Anastasia Metelkina and Luka Berulava and Brits Anastasia Vaipan-Law and Luke Digby. Chtchetinina and Woźniak competed once more before the Polish National Championships, finishing fourth at their first Challenger event, the 2023 Golden Spin of Zagreb.

At the 2024 Four Nationals Championship, Chtchetinina and Woźniak placed second in the combined senior pairs event, but won the Polish national title by default as the sole Polish entrant. Their win yielded assignments to both the 2024 European Championships and the 2024 World Championships. The team competed just once more before the championship season began, winning the silver medal at the 2024 Bavarian Open between Daria Danilova and Michel Tsiba from the Netherlands, and Barbora Kucianová and Martin Bidař of the Czech Republic.

They ultimately finished tenth at the European Championships and nineteenth at the World Championships.

==== 2024–25 season: Grand Prix debut, Challenger Series gold ====
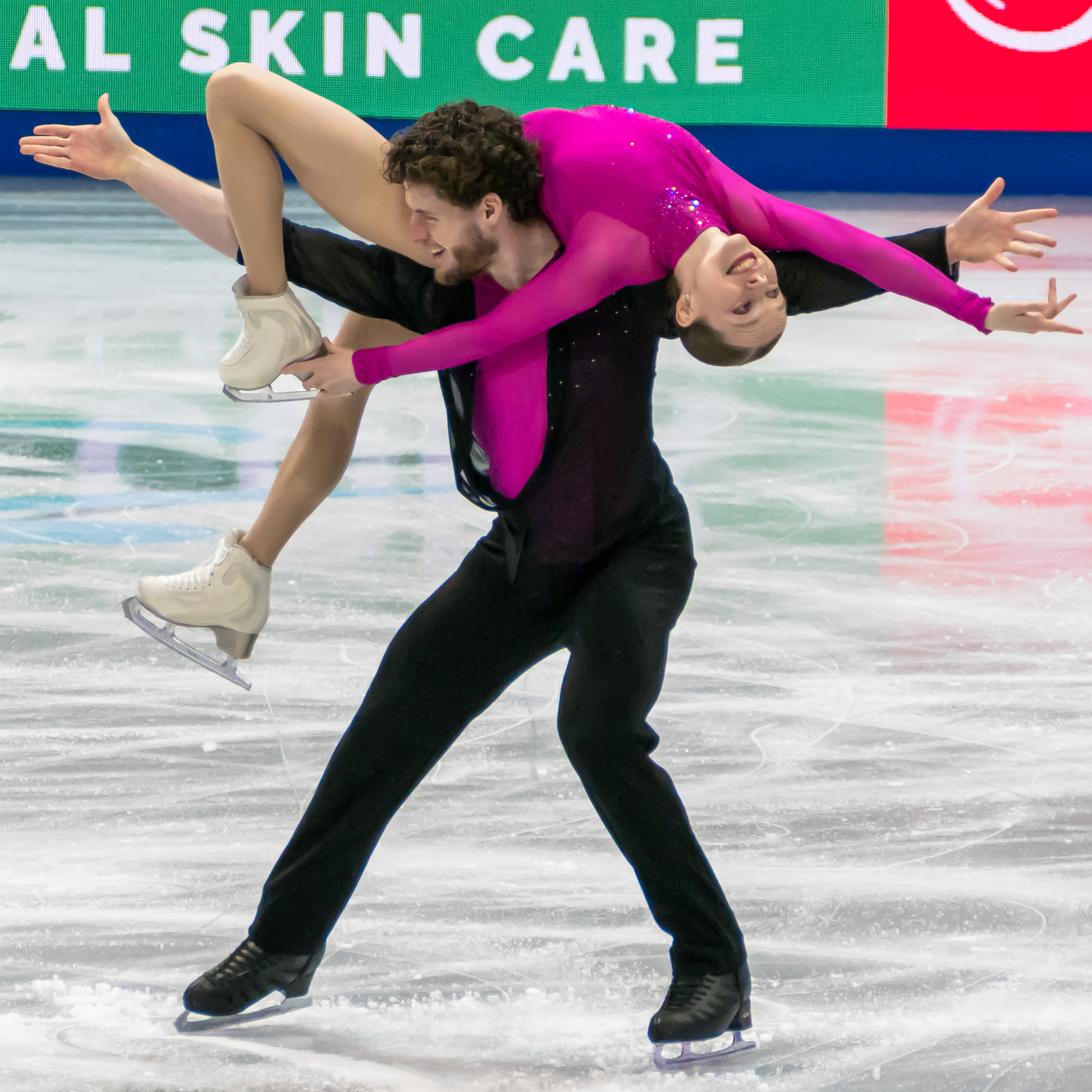
Woźniak and Chtchetinina in the ending pose of their short program at the 2025 World Championships

Chtchetinina/Woźniak opened their second season together at the 2024 Nebelhorn Trophy, where they finished in seventh place. They then went on to take silver at the 2024 Diamond Spin for a second consecutive time.

Following the withdrawal of Italians Lucrezia Beccari and Matteo Guarise, Chtchetinina and Woźniak were assigned to compete on the 2024–25 Grand Prix circuit at 2024 Skate Canada International as substitutes. They finished in sixth place at the event. Chtchetinina and Woźniak were later assigned to the 2024 Cup of China as well, where they finished fourth. The team was happy with their placement, but wanted to hit the 180 mark for the total score.

In December, Chtchetinina/Woźniak won the gold medal at the 2024 Golden Spin of Zagreb. They followed this up with another gold medal at the 2025 Four National Championships.

At the 2025 European Championships in Tallinn, Estonia, Chtchetinina/Woźniak finished in seventh overall after placing seventh in both the short and free program segments. Two weeks later, they won the bronze medal at the 2025 International Challenge Cup.

In March, Chtchetinina/Woźniak competed at the 2025 World Championships, held in Boston, Massachusetts, United States. They placed nineteenth in the short program but following a clean free skate, placed twelfth in that segment and moved up to fourteenth overall. With this placement, Chtchetinina/Woźniak won Poland a quota for pair skating at the 2026 Winter Olympics. In an interview following the free skate, Chtchetinina shared, "I am so thankful to have Michal by my side. He was such a rock for me, and he managed to keep his calm and acted like nothing much happened. I was so disappointed during the short program today. I am so happy that we kept fighting, and today was so much better."

=== 2025–26 season: Milano Cortina Olympics ===
Chtchetinina/Woźniak started the season by competing on the 2025–26 Challenger Series, finishing thirteenth at the 2025 CS Nebelhorn Trophy and sixth at the 2025 CS Trialeti Trophy. They subsequently competed on the 2025–26 Grand Prix series, placing eighth at both 2025 Skate Canada International and the 2025 Finlandia Trophy.

In December, Chtchetinina/Woźniak won the bronze medal at the 2026 Four National Championships. The following month, they finished eighth at the 2026 European Championships in Sheffield, England, United Kingdom.

In February, Chtchetinina/Woźniak placed eighth in the short program with a new season's best score in the 2026 Winter Olympics Figure Skating Team Event. “After we finished the important element, I started seeing the Olympic rings and getting emotional,” said Chtchetinina. “I had a little stumble, but then I went back into focus. And at the end, during the step sequence, I was just soaking in the moment. I was living the dream.”

== Programs ==
=== Pair skating with Ioulia Chtchetinina ===
Season	Short program	Free skate	Exhibition	Ref.
2023–24	"Down (Black Caviar Remix)"; By Marian Hill; Choreo. by Robynne Tweedale	"I Love You"; By Woodkid; Choreo. by Maciej Bernadowski		
2024–25	"Moderation"; By Florence and the Machine; Choreo. by Mark Pillay & Paul Boll	"I Love You"; By Woodkid; Choreo. by Maciej Bernadowski	"Down (Black Caviar Remix)"; By Marian Hill; Choreo. by Robynne Tweedale	
2025–26	"Moderation"; By Florence and the Machine; Choreo. by Mark Pillay & Paul Boll	Reel Around the Sun (from Riverdance) By Bill Whelan Choreo. by Mark Pillay & Paul Boll; "I Love You"		

=== Pair skating with Anna Hernik ===
Season	Short program	Free skate	Ref.
2021–22	Salut By Hélène Ségara & Joe Dassin Choreo. by Marianne Gola & Mateusz Chruscinski	Hasta Que Te Conocí By Juan Gabriel Choreo. by Marianne Gola & Mateusz Chruscinski	

=== Single skating ===
Season	Short program	Free skate	Ref.
2018–19	"Heartbreak Hotel"; "Hard Headed Woman" By Elvis Presley Choreo. by Maciej Bernadowski & Marianne Gola	Vivir By Don Juan Choreo. by Maciej Bernadowski & Marianne Gola	

== Competitive highlights ==
- GP – Event of the ISU Grand Prix Series
- CS – Event of the ISU Challenger Series
- JGP – Event of the ISU Junior Grand Prix Series
- TBD – Assigned
- WD – Withdrew from competition
- Medals at team events are awarded for the team results only. Individual placements at team events are listed in parentheses.

=== Pair skating with Ioulia Chtchetinina ===
Competition placements at senior level
Season	2023–24	2024–25	2025–26
Winter Olympics			13th
Winter Olympics (Team event)			10th (8th)
World Championships	19th	14th	
European Championships	10th	7th	8th
Polish Championships	1st	1st	1st
Four Nationals Championships	2nd	1st	3rd
GP Cup of China		4th	
GP Finland			8th
GP Skate Canada		6th	8th
CS Golden Spin of Zagreb	4th	1st	
CS Nebelhorn Trophy		7th	13th
CS Trialeti Trophy			6th
Bavarian Open	2nd		
Budapest Trophy	4th		
Challenge Cup		3rd	
Diamond Spin	2nd	2nd	
Warsaw Cup	3rd		

=== Pair skating with Anna Hernik ===
Competition placements at senior level
Season	2020–21	2021–22
Polish Championships	WD	1st
Four Nationals Championships	WD	3rd
CS Nebelhorn Trophy		16th

=== Single skating ===
Competition placements at junior level
Season	2012–13	2013–14	2014–15	2015–16	2016–17	2017–18	2018–19	2019–20
Polish Championships (Senior)					8th		7th	4th
Polish Championships (Junior)	10th	7th	5th	1st	6th	3rd	5th	
JGP Czech Republic							19th	
JGP Poland				24th				
Mentor Toruń Cup				8th				
Tirnavia Ice Cup					9th			
Warsaw Cup							10th	

== Detailed results ==
=== Pair skating with Ioulia Chtchetinina ===
ISU personal best scores in the +5/-5 GOE System
Segment	Type	Score	Event
Total	TSS	185.86	2026 Winter Olympics
Short program	TSS	65.23	2026 Winter Olympics
Short program	TES	36.58	2026 Winter Olympics
Short program	PCS	28.65	2026 Winter Olympics
Free skating	TSS	122.74	2024 CS Golden Spin of Zagreb
Free skating	TES	63.47	2024 CS Golden Spin of Zagreb
Free skating	PCS	59.27	2024 CS Golden Spin of Zagreb

Results in the 2023-24 season
Date	Event	SP		FS		Total	
Date	Event	P	Score	P	Score	P	Score
Oct 13–15, 2023	(Hungary) 2023 Budapest Trophy	4	53.42	4	102.74	4	156.16
Oct 19–22, 2023	(Poland) 2023 Diamond Spin	2	53.19	2	109.54	2	162.73
Nov 16–19, 2023	(Poland) 2023 Warsaw Cup	4	47.62	2	105.40	3	153.02
Dec 6–9, 2023	(Croatia) 2023 CS Golden Spin of Zagreb	4	54.12	4	105.03	4	159.15
Dec 14–16, 2023	(Czech Republic) 2024 Four Nationals Championships	3	55.11	2	106.47	2	161.58
Dec 14–16, 2023	(Czech Republic) 2024 Polish Championships (Note: The Polish Championships are contested as part of the Four Nationals Championships.)	1	—N/a	1	—N/a	1	—N/a
Jan 8–14, 2024	(Lithuania) 2024 European Championships	11	53.61	11	101.30	10	154.91
Jan 30 – Feb 4, 2024	(Germany) 2024 Bavarian Open	2	59.33	2	110.43	2	169.76
Mar 18–24, 2024	(Canada) 2024 World Championships	18	56.24	19	99.67	19	155.91

Results in the 2024-25 season
Date	Event	SP		FS		Total	
Date	Event	P	Score	P	Score	P	Score
Sep 19–21, 2024	(Germany) 2024 CS Nebelhorn Trophy	5	60.64	5	113.58	7	174.22
Oct 15–20, 2024	(Poland) 2024 Diamond Spin	2	60.23	2	119.02	2	179.25
Oct 25–27, 2024	2024 Skate Canada International	6	60.87	6	112.97	6	173/84
Nov 22–24, 2024	2024 Cup of China	4	61.11	5	115.93	4	177.04
Dec 4–7, 2024	(Croatia) 2024 CS Golden Spin of Zagreb	2	62.76	1	122.74	1	185.50
Dec 13–15, 2024	(Poland) 2025 Four Nationals Championships	1	62.82	1	121.58	1	184.40
Dec 13–15, 2024	(Poland) 2025 Polish Championships	1	—N/a	1	—N/a	1	—N/a
Jan 28 – Feb 2, 2025	(Estonia) 2025 European Championships	7	60.31	7	117.55	7	177.86
Feb 13–16, 2025	(Netherlands) 2025 Challenge Cup	2	55.19	3	110.17	3	165.36
Mar 25–30, 2025	(United States) 2025 World Championships	19	56.37	12	116.81	14	173.18

Results in the 2025–26 season
Date	Event	SP		FS		Total	
Date	Event	P	Score	P	Score	P	Score
Sep 25–27, 2025	(Germany) 2025 CS Nebelhorn Trophy	13	57.01	12	101.37	13	158.38
Oct 8–11, 2025	(Georgia (country)) 2025 CS Trialeti Trophy	7	55.41	6	108.18	6	163.59
Oct 31 – Nov 2, 2025	2025 Skate Canada International	7	59.76	8	103.46	8	163.22
Nov 21–22, 2025	(Finland) 2025 Finlandia Trophy	8	56.55	8	99.04	8	155.59
Dec 11–13, 2025	(Slovakia) 2026 Four Nationals Championships	2	63.55	3	106.82	3	170.37
Dec 11–13, 2025	(Poland) 2026 Polish Championships	1	—N/a	1	—N/a	1	—N/a
Jan 13–18, 2026	(United Kingdom) 2026 European Championships	10	56.93	8	111.91	8	168.84
Feb 6–8, 2026	(Italy) 2026 Winter Olympics – Team event	8	60.20	—N/a	—N/a	10	—N/a
Feb 6–19, 2026	(Italy) 2026 Winter Olympics	15	65.23	13	120.63	13	185.86
Mar 24–29, 2026	(Czech Republic) 2026 World Championships	13	63.59	11	118.68	11	182.27
