= 2026 Four Nationals Figure Skating Championships =

Figure skating competition

- Type: National championships
- Date: December 12 – 13, 2025
- Season: 2025–26
- Location: Prešov, Slovakia
- Host: Slovak Figure Skating Association
- Venue: ICE Arena Zimny stadion

Champions
- Men's singles: (Slovakia) Adam Hagara
- Women's singles: (Poland) Ekaterina Kurakova
- Pairs: (Hungary) Maria Pavlova and Alexei Sviatchenko
- Ice dance: (Czech Republic) Kateřina Mrázková and Daniel Mrázek
- Previous: 2025 Four Nationals Championships
- Next: 2027 Four Nationals Championships

The 2026 Four Nationals Figure Skating Championships were held from December 12–13, 2025, at the ICE Arena Zimny stadion in Prešov, Slovakia. Medals were awarded in men's singles, women's singles, pair skating, and ice dance at the senior level, and pair skating and ice dance at the junior level. Skaters from the Czech Republic, Hungary, Poland, and Slovakia competed together; the results were then split by country to determine each country's national medalists. The results are part of the selection criteria for the 2026 European Championships, 2026 Winter Olympics, 2026 World Championships, and 2026 World Junior Championships.

== Medal summary ==
=== Senior level ===
Discipline	Gold	Silver	Bronze
Men	(Slovakia); Adam Hagara	(Poland); Vladimir Samoilov	(Czech Republic); Georgii Reshtenko
Women	(Poland); Ekaterina Kurakova	(Czech Republic); Barbora Vránková	(Czech Republic); Michaela Vrašťáková
Pairs	(Hungary); Maria Pavlova; Alexei Sviatchenko	(Czech Republic); Anna Valesi; Martin Bidař	(Poland); Ioulia Chtchetinina; Michał Woźniak
Ice dance	(Czech Republic); Kateřina Mrázková; Daniel Mrázek	(Czech Republic); Natálie Taschlerová; Filip Taschler	(Hungary); Mariia Ignateva; Danijil Szemko

=== Junior level ===
Discipline	Gold	Silver	Bronze
Pairs	(Hungary); Lily Wilberforce; Mózes József Berei	(Czech Republic); Johanka Žilková; Matyáš Becerra	(Czech Republic); Debora Anna Cohen; Lukáš Vochozka
Ice dance	(Czech Republic); Diane Sznajder; Jáchym Novák	(Slovakia); Lucia Stefanovova; Jacopo Boeris	(Czech Republic); Eliška Žáková; Filip Mencl

== National medalists ==
=== Senior level ===
==== Czech Republic ====
Discipline	Gold	Silver	Bronze
Men	Georgii Reshtenko	Tadeáš Václavík	Jan Valtera
Women	Barbora Vránková	Michaela Vrašťáková	Eliška Březinová
Pairs	Anna Valesi; Martin Bidař	—N/a	
Ice dance	Kateřina Mrázková; Daniel Mrázek	Natálie Taschlerová; Filip Taschler	—N/a

==== Hungary ====
Discipline	Gold	Silver	Bronze
Men	Aleksei Vlasenko	—N/a	
Women	Léna Ekker	Katinka Anna Zsembery	Vivien Papp
Pairs	Maria Pavlova; Alexei Sviatchenko	—N/a	
Ice dance	Mariia Ignateva; Danijil Szemko	Emese Csiszér; Mark Shapiro	Lara Luft; Ilias Fourati

==== Poland ====
Discipline	Gold	Silver	Bronze
Men	Vladimir Samoilov	Matvii Yefymenko	Jakub Lofek
Women	Ekaterina Kurakova	Laura Szczęsna	Weronika Ferlin
Pairs	Ioulia Chtchetinina; Michał Woźniak	—N/a	
Ice dance	Sofiia Dovhal; Wiktor Kulesza	Zofia Grzegorzewska; Oleg Muratov	Helena Carhart; Filip Bojanowski

==== Slovakia ====
Discipline	Gold	Silver	Bronze
Men	Adam Hagara	Jozef Čurma	—N/a
Women	Vanesa Šelmeková	Terézia Pócsová	Simona Koleňáková

=== Junior level ===
==== Czech Republic ====
Discipline	Gold	Silver	Bronze
Pairs	Johanka Žilková; Matyáš Becerra	Debora Anna Cohen; Lukáš Vochozka	Alžběta Kvíderová; Jindřich Klement
Ice dance	Diane Sznajder; Jáchym Novák	Eliška Žáková; Filip Mencl	Kristýna Štanclová; Karel Kostroň

==== Hungary ====
Discipline	Gold	Silver	Bronze
Ice dance	Villö Szilágyi; Istvan Jaracs	Lányi Aletta; Huba Gallai	Diane Gallix; Előd Egyed-Zsigmond
Pairs	Lily Wilberforce; Mózes József Berei	—N/a	

==== Poland ====
Discipline	Gold	Silver	Bronze
Ice Dance	Laura Balcerska; David Diadchenko	Yelyzaveta Lisova; Jakub Janicki	Zofia Gawron; Dawid Kamiński

==== Slovakia ====
Discipline	Gold	Silver	Bronze
Ice dance	Lucia Štefanovová; Jacopo Boeris	—N/a	

== Senior results ==
=== Men's singles ===
Men's results
Rank	Skater	Nation	Total points	SP		FS	
1st place, gold medalist(s)	Adam Hagara	Slovakia	226.70	1	79.58	1	147.12
2nd place, silver medalist(s)	Vladimir Samoilov	Poland	206.94	2	75.55	3	131.39
3rd place, bronze medalist(s)	Georgii Reshtenko	Czech Republic	204.66	3	71.08	2	133.58
4	Tadeáš Václavík	Czech Republic	187.62	4	64.01	4	123.61
5	Matvii Yefymenko	Poland	185.15	5	61.60	5	123.55
6	Jakub Lofek	Poland	177.19	6	60.84	6	116.35
7	Aleksei Vlasenko	Hungary	151.36	9	47.60	7	103.76
8	Jan Valtera	Czech Republic	149.35	10	45,65	8	103.70
9	Jozef Čurma	Slovakia	140.82	8	52.99	9	87.83
10	Filip Ščerba	Czech Republic	138.49	7	57.72	10	80.77
WD	Kornel Witkowski	Poland	withdrew from competition				

=== Women's singles ===
Women's results
Rank	Skater	Nation	Total points	SP		FS	
1st place, gold medalist(s)	Ekaterina Kurakova	Poland	166.63	1	57.15	1	109.48
2nd place, silver medalist(s)	Barbora Vránková	Czech Republic	163.73	3	56.55	2	107.18
3rd place, bronze medalist(s)	Michaela Vrašťáková	Czech Republic	151.53	6	49.71	3	101.82
4	Laura Szczęsna	Poland	143.43	4	51.59	5	91.84
5	Vanesa Šelmeková	Slovakia	139.56	12	41.20	4	98.36
6	Weronika Ferlin	Poland	139.48	2	57.13	12	82.35
7	Eliška Březinová	Czech Republic	136.97	5	51.25	7	85.72
8	Terézia Pócsová	Slovakia	129.48	9	44.06	8	85.42
9	Léna Ekker	Hungary	127.30	11	41.35	6	85.95
10	Nela Šnebergerová	Czech Republic	126.22	7	49.15	15	77.07
11	Katinka Zsembery	Hungary	123.06	15	39.51	9	82.55
12	Oliwia Strokosz	Poland	121.16	8	47.09	16	74.07
13	Marietta Atkins	Poland	120.53	17	37.13	10	83.40
14	Yelyzaveta Surova	Poland	119.29	18	36.92	11	82.37
15	Vivien Papp	Hungary	116.62	16	37.71	13	78.91
16	Karolina Białas	Poland	114.21	20	36.47	14	77.74
17	Martina Petra Major	Hungary	112.17	13	40.54	19	71.63
18	Magdalena Zawadzka	Poland	109.99	10	43.47	20	66.52
19	Sára Parkosová	Czech Republic	108.18	19	36.50	19	71.68
20	Markéta Sukupová	Czech Republic	107.68	21	35.42	17	72.26
21	Adéla Vallová	Czech Republic	104.59	14	39.76	22	64.83
22	Simona Koleňáková	Slovakia	98.80	23	32.86	21	65.84
23	Andrea Bačová	Slovakia	97.07	22	35.17	23	61.90

=== Pairs ===
Pairs results
Rank	Team	Nation	Total points	SP		FS	
1st place, gold medalist(s)	Maria Pavlova; Alexei Sviatchenko	Hungary	213.77	1	76.33	1	137.44
2nd place, silver medalist(s)	Anna Valesi; Martin Bidař	Czech Republic	175.78	3	62.30	2	113.48
3rd place, bronze medalist(s)	Ioulia Chtchetinina; Michał Woźniak	Poland	170.37	2	63.55	3	106.82

=== Ice dance ===
Ice dance results
Rank	Team	Nation	Total points	RD		FD	
1st place, gold medalist(s)	Kateřina Mrázková; Daniel Mrázek	Czech Republic	196.70	1	78.86	1	117.84
2nd place, silver medalist(s)	Natálie Taschlerová; Filip Taschler	Czech Republic	186.03	2	74.91	2	111.12
3rd place, bronze medalist(s)	Mariia Ignateva; Danijil Szemko	Hungary	179.77	3	72.49	3	107.28
4	Sofiia Dovhal; Wiktor Kulesza	Poland	148.21	4	60.00	5	88.21
5	Zofia Grzegorzewska; Oleg Muratov	Poland	147.97	5	57.23	4	90.74
6	Emese Csiszér; Mark Shapiro	Hungary	140.99	6	56.21	7	84.78
7	Helena Carhart; Filip Bojanowski	Poland	140.28	7	54.96	6	85.32
8	Lara Luft; Ilias Fourati	Hungary	133.05	8	51.35	8	81.70
9	Olexandra Borysova; Aaron Freeman	Poland	123.26	9	48.47	9	74.79

== Junior results ==
=== Pairs ===
Pairs' results
Rank	Team	Nation	Total points	SP		FS	
1st place, gold medalist(s)	Lily Wilberforce; Mózes József Berei	Hungary	137.22	2	49.59	1	87.63
2nd place, silver medalist(s)	Johanka Žilková; Matyáš Becerra	Czech Republic	127.26	1	51.27	2	75.99
3rd place, bronze medalist(s)	Debora Anna Cohen; Lukáš Vochozka	Czech Republic	119.79	3	49.46	4	70.33
4	Alžběta Kvíderová; Jindřich Klement	Czech Republic	119.03	4	46.31	3	72.72

=== Ice dance ===
Ice dance results
Rank	Team	Nation	Total points	RD		FD	
1st place, gold medalist(s)	Diane Sznajder; Jáchym Novák	Czech Republic	140.52	1	57.92	1	82.60
2nd place, silver medalist(s)	Lucia Štefanovová; Jacopo Boeris	Slovakia	131.36	3	52.81	2	78.55
3rd place, bronze medalist(s)	Eliška Žáková; Filip Mencl	Czech Republic	128.10	2	52.82	3	75.28
4	Kristýna Štanclová; Karel Kostroň	Czech Republic	121.79	6	47.77	4	74.02
5	Villö Szilágyi; Istvan Jaracs	Hungary	115.64	4	47.70	7	66.94
6	Lányi Aletta; Huba Gallai	Hungary	114.89	5	48.32	8	66.57
7	Laura Balcerska; David Diadchenko	Poland	113.89	8	45,35	6	68.54
8	Diane Gallix; Előd Egyed-Zsigmond	Hungary	113.02	7	47.46	9	65.56
9	Yelyzaveta Lisova; Jakub Janicki	Poland	110.90	11	42.22	5	68.68
10	Alexandra Rousková; Lukáš Toman	Czech Republic	109.09	9	44.44	11	64.65
11	Barbora Klesalová; Matěj Klesal	Czech Republic	107.71	10	44.42	13	63.29
12	Marina Belovodjaninová; Aleksandr Tokarev	Czech Republic	104.47	12	40.36	12	64.11
13	Klára Vlčková; Tomáš Vlček	Czech Republic	103.98	13	39.28	10	64.70
14	Zofia Gawron; Dawid Kamiński	Poland	74.65	14	29.83	14	44.82
