= 2026–27 national figure skating championships =

- Type: National championship
- Season: 2026–27
- Host: ISU member nations
- Previous: 2025–26
- Next: 2027–28

National figure skating championships for the 2026–27 season began on July 1, 2026, and will end on June 30, 2027. They will be held to crown national champions and to serve as part of the selection process for international events, such as the 2026 ISU Championships. Medals will be awarded in the disciplines of men's singles, women's singles, pairs, and ice dance. Several countries choose to organize their national championships together with their neighbors; the results will be subsequently divided into national podiums.

== National competitions ==
Code key
S – Senior event	J – Junior event	N – Novice event	M – Men's singles	W – Women's singles	P – Pair skating	D – Ice dance

Color key

- National championships
- Other domestic competition

2026
Dates	Event	Type	Level	Disc.	Location	Ref.
July 17–19	U.S. Collegiate Championships	Other	All	M/W	Richfield, Minnesota, United States	
August 3–5	Argentine Championships	Nationals			Buenos Aires, Argentina	
August 28–30	Master's de Patinage	Other	S/J	All	Louviers, France	
October 16–18	Vietnamese Championships	Nationals	J	M/W	Hanoi, Vietnam	
October 27 – November 1	Romanian Championships	Nationals	S	M/W	Bucharest, Romania	
October 29 – November 1	New Zealand Championships	Nationals	All	M/W	Gore, New Zealand	
November 3–7	Eastern Sectional Final	Other	All	M/W/P	Norwood, Massachusetts, United States	
November 11–15	Midwestern Sectional Final	Other	All	M/W/D	Bloomfield, Michigan, United States	
November 16–21	Pacific Coast Sectional Final	Other	All	M/W	San Jose, California, United States	
November 19–21	Philippine Championships	Nationals	All	M/W	Manila, Philippines	
November 20–21	Belgian Championships	Nationals	All	M/W	Deurne, Belgium	
November 21–23	Japan Junior Championships	Nationals	J	All	Hitachinaka, Ibaraki, Japan	
November 26–29	Skate Canada Challenge	Other	S/J	All	Winnipeg, Manitoba, Canada	
November 27–29	Icelandic Championships	Nationals			Akureyri, Iceland	
November 27 – December 4	Australian Championships	Nationals			Perth, Australia	
December 1–6	British Championships	Nationals	All	All	Sheffield, England, United Kingdom	
December 4–6	Norwegian Championships	Nationals	S/J		Asker, Norway	
December 5–7	Danish Championships	Nationals			Hørsholm, Denmark	
December 5–6	Latvian Championships	Nationals			Riga, Latvia	
December 5–6	Chinese Taipei Championships	Nationals			Taipei, Taiwan	
December 10–13	Swedish Championships	Nationals	S/J	M/W/D	Borås, Sweden	
December 12–13	Estonian Championships	Nationals	S	M/W	Tallinn, Estonia	
December 10–13	Brazilian Championships	Nationals			São Paulo, Brazil	
December 11–13	Austrian Championships	Nationals	S/J	All	Vienna, Austria	
December 12-13	Lithuanian Championships	Nationals			Kaunas, Lithuania	
December 17–19	Four Nationals Championships	Nationals	S/J	All	Budapest, Hungary	
December 18–19	German Championships	Nationals	S	All	Krefeld, Germany	
December 18−20	Finnish Championships	Nationals	S/J	M/W/D	Oulu, Finland	
December 18−20	French Championships	Nationals	S/J	All	Vaujany, France	
December 18−20	Swiss Championships	Nationals	S/J	M/W/P	Fribourg, Switzerland	
December 19–20	Croatian Championships	Nationals	All		Zagreb, Croatia	
December 21–23	Italian Championships	Nationals	S/J	All	Milan, Italy	
December 24–27	Japan Championships	Nationals	S	All	Osaka, Japan	

2027
Dates	Event	Type	Level	Disc.	Location	Ref.
January 5–10	U.S. Championships	Nationals	S/J	All	Salt Lake City, Utah, United States	
January 12–17	Canadian Championships	Nationals	S/J	All	Mississauga, Canada	
February 20−21	Dutch Championships	Nationals			Tilburg, Netherlands	

== Senior medalists ==
=== Men's singles ===
Championships	Gold	Silver	Bronze	Ref.
Belgium	Denis Krouglov	No other competitors		
New Zealand	Dwayne Li	No other competitors		
Philippines	Lorenzo Elano	Brandon Baldoz	Michael Christian Martinez	
Romania	Luc Economides	No other competitors		

=== Women's singles ===
Championships	Gold	Silver	Bronze	Ref.
Belgium	Ilona Van Steenberghe	Charlotte Jennes	No other competitors	
New Zealand	Cara Tang]	Brooke Cathro	Cordelia Shi	
Philippines	Maxine Bautista	Sasha Giammarco	Skye Frances Patena	
Romania	Julia Sauter	Ana Stratulat	Ana Sofia Beșchea	

=== Pairs ===
Championships	Gold	Silver	Bronze	Ref.

=== Ice dance ===
Championships	Gold	Silver	Bronze	Ref.

== Junior medalists ==
=== Men's singles ===
Championships	Gold	Silver	Bronze	Ref.
Belgium	Mohammed Aamara	Yann Feitz	No other competitors	
New Zealand	Michael Duan	No other competitors		

=== Women's singles ===
Championships	Gold	Silver	Bronze	Ref.
Belgium	Lilou Remeysen	Indra Sollie	Dot Bervoets	
New Zealand	Judy Tong	Nicca Wu	Mia Chen	
Philippines	Isabella Miel Hazelton	Sofia Palmares	Giuliana Angeli Dinopol	

=== Pairs ===
Championships	Gold	Silver	Bronze	Ref.

=== Ice dance ===
Championships	Gold	Silver	Bronze	Ref.
