= 2025 European Figure Skating Championships =

European figure skating competition

- Type: ISU Championship
- Date: 28 January – 2 February
- Season: 2024–25
- Location: Tallinn, Estonia
- Host: Estonian Skating Union
- Venue: Tondiraba Ice Hall

Champions
- Men's singles: (Switzerland) Lukas Britschgi
- Women's singles: (Estonia) Niina Petrõkina
- Pairs: (Germany) Minerva Fabienne Hase and Nikita Volodin
- Ice dance: (Italy) Charlène Guignard and Marco Fabbri
- Previous: 2024 European Championships
- Next: 2026 European Championships

The 2025 European Figure Skating Championships were held from 28 January to 2 February 2025 at the Tondiraba Ice Hall in Tallinn, Estonia. The competition determined the entry quotas for each skating federation at the 2026 European Championships. Medals were awarded in men's singles, women's singles, pair skating, and ice dance.

The competition was originally scheduled to be held in Zagreb, Croatia, but the Croatian Skating Federation backed out in May 2024 due to "unforeseen circumstances".

== Qualification ==
=== Number of entries per discipline ===
Based on the results of the 2024 European Championships, each European ISU member nations could field between one and three entries per discipline. Additionally, Russia and Belarus remained suspended due to the Russian invasion of Ukraine.

Number of entries per discipline
Spots	Men	Women	Pairs	Ice dance
3	Italy	Belgium; Switzerland	Georgia; Germany; Italy	France
2	Czech Republic; Estonia; France; Georgia; Latvia; Poland; Switzerland	Austria; Finland; France; Georgia; Italy; Romania	Great Britain; Hungary; Netherlands; Poland	Czech Republic; Finland; Georgia; Great Britain; Italy; Lithuania

== Entries ==
The International Skating Union released a complete list of entrants on 2 January 2025.

Entries
Country	Men	Women	Pairs	Ice dance
Armenia	Semen Daniliants	—N/a		Kristina Dobroserdova; Alessandro Pellegrini
Austria	Maurizio Zandron	Stefanie Pesendorfer	Sophia Schaller; Livio Mayr	—N/a
Austria	—N/a	Flora Marie Schaller	—N/a	—N/a
Azerbaijan	Vladimir Litvintsev	—N/a		Samantha Ritter; Daniel Brykalov
Belgium	—N/a	Jade Hovine	—N/a	
Belgium	—N/a	Nina Pinzarrone	—N/a	
Bulgaria	Alexander Zlatkov	Alexandra Feigin	—N/a	
Croatia	Jari Kessler	—N/a		
Cyprus	—N/a			Angelina Kudryavtseva; Ilia Karankevich
Czech Republic	Georgii Reshtenko	Michaela Vrašťáková	—N/a	Kateřina Mrázková; Daniel Mrázek
Czech Republic	Filip Ščerba	—N/a	—N/a	Natálie Taschlerová; Filip Taschler
Estonia	Aleksandr Selevko	Niina Petrõkina	—N/a	
Estonia	Mihhail Selevko	—N/a	—N/a	
Finland	Valtter Virtanen	Linnea Ceder	Milania Väänänen; Filippo Clerici	Yuka Orihara; Juho Pirinen
Finland	—N/a	Janna Jyrkinen	—N/a	Juulia Turkkila; Matthias Versluis
France	Kévin Aymoz	Lorine Schild	Camille Kovalev; Pavel Kovalev	Loïcia Demougeot; Théo le Mercier
France	Adam Siao Him Fa	Léa Serna	—N/a	Natacha Lagouge; Arnaud Caffa
France	—N/a		—N/a	Evgeniia Lopareva; Geoffrey Brissaud
Georgia	Nika Egadze	Anastasiia Gubanova	Anastasiia Metelkina; Luka Berulava	Diana Davis; Gleb Smolkin
Germany	Nikita Starostin	Kristina Isaev	Minerva Fabienne Hase; Nikita Volodin	Jennifer Janse van Rensburg; Benjamin Steffan
Germany	—N/a		Annika Hocke; Robert Kunkel	—N/a
Germany	—N/a		Letizia Roscher; Luis Schuster	—N/a
Great Britain	Edward Appleby	Kristen Spours	Anastasia Vaipan-Law; Luke Digby	Lilah Fear; Lewis Gibson
Great Britain	—N/a			Phebe Bekker; James Hernandez
Hungary	Aleksandr Vlasenko	Katinka Anna Zsembery	Maria Pavlova; Alexei Sviatchenko	Mariia Ignateva; Danijil Leonyidovics Szemko
Iceland	—N/a		Júlía Sylvía Gunnarsdóttir; Manuel Piazza	—N/a
Ireland	—N/a			Carolane Soucisse; Shane Firus
Israel	Lev Vinokur	Mariia Seniuk	—N/a	
Italy	Daniel Grassl	Lara Naki Gutmann	Irma Caldara; Riccardo Maglio	Charlène Guignard; Marco Fabbri
Italy	Nikolaj Memola	Anna Pezzetta	Sara Conti; Niccolò Macii	Victoria Manni; Carlo Röthlisberger
Italy	Matteo Rizzo	—N/a	Rebecca Ghilardi; Filippo Ambrosini	—N/a
Latvia	Fedir Kulish	Anastasija Konga	—N/a	
Latvia	Deniss Vasiļjevs	—N/a	—N/a	
Lithuania	Daniel Korabelnik	Jogailė Aglinskytė	—N/a	Paulina Ramanauskaitė; Deividas Kizala
Lithuania	—N/a		—N/a	Allison Reed; Saulius Ambrulevičius
Monaco	Davide Lewton Brain	—N/a		
Netherlands	—N/a	Niki Wories	Daria Danilova; Michel Tsiba	Hanna Jakucs; Alessio Galli
Norway	—N/a	Mia Risa Gomez	—N/a	
Poland	Vladimir Samoilov	Ekaterina Kurakova	Ioulia Chtchetinina; Michał Woźniak	Sofiia Dovhal; Wiktor Kulesza
Poland	Kornel Witkowski	—N/a		
Romania	—N/a	Ana Sofia Beschea	—N/a	Emilia Monika Ziobrowska; Shiloh Douglas Judd
Romania	—N/a	Julia Sauter	—N/a	—N/a
Serbia	—N/a	Antonina Dubinina	—N/a	
Slovakia	Adam Hagara	Vanesa Šelmeková	—N/a	Mária Sofia Pucherová; Nikita Lysak
Slovenia	David Sedej	Julija Lovrenčič	—N/a	
Spain	Tomàs-Llorenç Guarino Sabaté	—N/a		Olivia Smart; Tim Dieck
Sweden	Andreas Nordebäck	Josefin Taljegård	Greta Crafoord; John Crafoord	Milla Ruud Reitan; Nikolaj Majorov
Switzerland	Noah Bodenstein	Kimmy Repond	Oxana Vouillamoz; Tom Bouvart	Gina Zehnder; Beda Leon Sieber
Switzerland	Lukas Britschgi	—N/a		
Turkey	Alp Eren Özkan	—N/a		Katarina DelCamp; Berk Akalın
Ukraine	Ivan Shmuratko	Anastasia Gozhva	Sofiia Holichenko; Artem Darenskyi	Mariia Pinchuk; Mykyta Pogorielov

=== Changes to preliminary assignments ===
Date	Discipline	Withdrew	Added	Notes	Ref.
13 January	Women	(Austria); Olga Mikutina	(Austria); Flora Marie Schaller	Health reasons	
21 January	Pairs	(Austria); Gabriella Izzo; Luc Maierhofer	(Austria); Sophia Schaller; Livio Mayr	Illness	
21 January	Women	(Belgium); Loena Hendrickx	—N/a	Injury	
22 January	Men	(Turkey); Burak Demirboga	(Turkey); Alp Eren Özkan		
27 January	Women	(Switzerland); Livia Kaiser	—N/a	Injury	

== Medal summary ==
=== Medalists ===
Medals awarded to the skaters who achieved the highest overall placements in each discipline:

Discipline	Gold	Silver	Bronze
Men	(Switzerland); Lukas Britschgi	(Italy); Nikolaj Memola	(France); Adam Siao Him Fa
Women	(Estonia); Niina Petrõkina	(Georgia (country)); Anastasiia Gubanova	(Belgium); Nina Pinzarrone
Pairs	(Germany); Minerva Fabienne Hase; Nikita Volodin	(Italy); Sara Conti; Niccolò Macii	(Georgia (country)); Anastasiia Metelkina; Luka Berulava
Ice dance	(Italy); Charlène Guignard; Marco Fabbri	(France); Evgeniia Lopareva; Geoffrey Brissaud	(United Kingdom); Lilah Fear; Lewis Gibson

Small medals awarded to the skaters who achieved the highest short program or rhythm dance placements in each discipline:

Discipline	Gold	Silver	Bronze
Men	(France); Adam Siao Him Fa	(Georgia (country)); Nika Egadze	(Poland); Vladimir Samoilov
Women	(Georgia (country)); Anastasiia Gubanova	(Estonia); Niina Petrõkina	(Switzerland); Kimmy Repond
Pairs	(Germany); Minerva Fabienne Hase; Nikita Volodin	(Italy); Sara Conti; Niccolò Macii	(Hungary); Maria Pavlova; Alexei Sviatchenko
Ice dance	(Italy); Charlène Guignard; Marco Fabbri	(France); Evgeniia Lopareva; Geoffrey Brissaud	(United Kingdom); Lilah Fear; Lewis Gibson

Small medals awarded to the skaters who achieved the highest free skating or free dance placements in each discipline:

Discipline	Gold	Silver	Bronze
Men	(Switzerland); Lukas Britschgi	(Italy); Nikolaj Memola	(France); Adam Siao Him Fa
Women	(Estonia); Niina Petrõkina	(Georgia (country)); Anastasiia Gubanova	(Belgium); Nina Pinzarrone
Pairs	(Germany); Minerva Fabienne Hase; Nikita Volodin	(Italy); Sara Conti; Niccolò Macii	(Georgia (country)); Anastasiia Metelkina; Luka Berulava
Ice dance	(Italy); Charlène Guignard; Marco Fabbri	(United Kingdom); Lilah Fear; Lewis Gibson	(Finland); Juulia Turkkila; Matthias Versluis

=== Medals by country ===
Table of medals for overall placement:

Rank	Nation	Gold	Silver	Bronze	Total
1	Italy	1	2	0	3
2	Estonia	1	0	0	1
2	Germany	1	0	0	1
2	Switzerland	1	0	0	1
5	France	0	1	1	2
5	Georgia	0	1	1	2
7	Belgium	0	0	1	1
7	Great Britain	0	0	1	1
Totals (8 entries)		4	4	4	12

== Results ==
=== Men's singles ===
Men's results
Rank	Skater	Nation	Total	SP		FS	
1st place, gold medalist(s)	Lukas Britschgi	Switzerland	267.09	8	82.90	1	184.19
2nd place, silver medalist(s)	Nikolaj Memola	Italy	262.61	5	84.92	2	177.69
3rd place, bronze medalist(s)	Adam Siao Him Fa	France	257.99	1	93.12	3	164.87
4	Nika Egadze	Georgia	243.87	2	91.94	8	151.93
5	Matteo Rizzo	Italy	241.21	4	85.68	6	155.53
6	Deniss Vasiļjevs	Latvia	239.70	12	77.82	4	161.88
7	Mihhail Selevko	Estonia	239.00	6	84.85	7	154.15
8	Daniel Grassl	Italy	237.74	10	78.15	5	159.59
9	Aleksandr Selevko	Estonia	230.91	7	84.65	11	146.26
10	Vladimir Samoilov	Poland	229.67	3	85.98	13	143.69
11	Andreas Nordebäck	Sweden	227.11	9	79.02	9	148.09
12	Adam Hagara	Slovakia	224.14	13	77.06	10	147.08
13	Lev Vinokur	Israel	221.04	14	76.35	12	144.69
14	Fedir Kulish	Latvia	214.33	15	74.48	14	139.85
15	Vladimir Litvintsev	Azerbaijan	208.83	11	77.86	16	130.97
16	Ivan Shmuratko	Ukraine	201.89	17	71.53	17	130.36
17	Semen Daniliants	Armenia	197.97	19	69.26	18	128.71
18	Kornel Witkowski	Poland	197.14	23	65.21	15	131.93
19	Tomàs-Llorenç Guarino Sabaté	Spain	190.23	21	67.66	19	122.57
20	Edward Appleby	Great Britain	187.84	16	72.45	21	115.39
21	Aleksandr Vlasenko	Hungary	185.52	22	67.25	20	118.27
22	Kévin Aymoz	France	183.84	18	70.68	22	113.16
23	Georgii Reshtenko	Czech Republic	175.23	20	68.05	24	107.18
24	Valtter Virtanen	Finland	174.83	24	65.18	23	109.65
25	Davide Lewton Brain	Monaco	63.81	25	63.81	Did not advance to free skate	
26	Maurizio Zandron	Austria	63.79	26	63.79	Did not advance to free skate	
27	Nikita Starostin	Germany	63.54	27	63.54	Did not advance to free skate	
28	David Sedej	Slovenia	59.46	28	59.46	Did not advance to free skate	
29	Alp Eren Özkan	Turkey	59.22	29	59.22	Did not advance to free skate	
30	Alexander Zlatkov	Bulgaria	58.61	30	58.61	Did not advance to free skate	
31	Filip Ščerba	Czech Republic	58.30	31	58.30	Did not advance to free skate	
32	Noah Bodenstein	Switzerland	53.75	32	53.75	Did not advance to free skate	
33	Daniel Korabelnik	Lithuania	53.02	33	53.02	Did not advance to free skate	
34	Jari Kessler	Croatia	50.83	34	50.83	Did not advance to free skate	

=== Women's singles ===
Women's results
Rank	Skater	Nation	Total	SP		FS	
1st place, gold medalist(s)	Niina Petrõkina	Estonia	208.18	2	68.94	1	139.24
2nd place, silver medalist(s)	Anastasiia Gubanova	Georgia	198.61	1	68.99	2	129.62
3rd place, bronze medalist(s)	Nina Pinzarrone	Belgium	191.44	4	66.80	3	124.64
4	Kimmy Repond	Switzerland	186.64	3	68.68	5	117.96
5	Anna Pezzetta	Italy	186.19	6	62.73	4	123.46
6	Lara Naki Gutmann	Italy	181.51	5	63.79	6	117.72
7	Julia Sauter	Romania	172.64	8	61.96	10	110.68
8	Ekaterina Kurakova	Poland	169.01	9	58.70	11	110.31
9	Kristen Spours	Great Britain	168.21	10	57.39	9	110.82
10	Lorine Schild	France	168.21	7	62.47	13	105.74
11	Léa Serna	France	163.70	17	50.33	7	113.37
12	Mia Risa Gomez	Norway	161.71	16	50.72	8	110.99
13	Mariia Seniuk	Israel	159.33	13	53.86	14	105.47
14	Alexandra Feigin	Bulgaria	159.26	14	53.32	12	105.94
15	Linnea Ceder	Finland	156.01	12	54.82	15	101.19
16	Jade Hovine	Belgium	154.46	11	56.19	16	98.27
17	Josefin Taljegård	Sweden	149.59	15	53.04	17	96.55
18	Janna Jyrkinen	Finland	146.18	18	50.30	18	95.88
19	Michaela Vrašťáková	Czech Republic	135.84	24	47.76	19	88.08
20	Vanesa Šelmeková	Slovakia	135.44	22	48.94	20	86.50
21	Anastasija Konga	Latvia	133.77	23	47.79	21	85.98
22	Julija Lovrenčič	Slovenia	133.49	20	49.40	22	84.09
23	Stefanie Pesendorfer	Austria	128.02	21	48.95	23	79.07
24	Jogailė Aglinskytė	Lithuania	118.75	19	50.11	24	68.64
25	Antonina Dubinina	Serbia	44.36	25	44.36	Did not advance to free skate	
26	Niki Wories	Netherlands	42.26	26	42.26	Did not advance to free skate	
27	Anastasia Gozhva	Ukraine	42.21	27	42.21	Did not advance to free skate	
28	Kristina Isaev	Germany	40.65	28	40.65	Did not advance to free skate	
29	Katinka Anna Zsembery	Hungary	40.59	29	40.59	Did not advance to free skate	
30	Flora Marie Schaller	Austria	36.69	30	36.69	Did not advance to free skate	
31	Ana Sofia Beşchea	Romania	36.60	31	36.60	Did not advance to free skate	

=== Pairs ===
Pairs' results
Rank	Team	Nation	Total	SP		FS	
1st place, gold medalist(s)	Minerva Fabienne Hase; Nikita Volodin	Germany	212.48	1	71.59	1	140.89
2nd place, silver medalist(s)	Sara Conti; Niccolò Macii	Italy	206.89	2	68.52	2	138.37
3rd place, bronze medalist(s)	Anastasiia Metelkina; Luka Berulava	Georgia	191.88	9	57.03	3	134.85
4	Maria Pavlova; Alexei Sviatchenko	Hungary	191.44	3	65.88	4	125.56
5	Anastasia Vaipan-Law; Luke Digby	Great Britain	183.76	4	64.83	6	118.93
6	Rebecca Ghilardi; Filippo Ambrosini	Italy	180.86	6	60.95	5	119.91
7	Ioulia Chtchetinina; Michał Woźniak	Poland	177.86	7	60.31	7	117.55
8	Annika Hocke; Robert Kunkel	Germany	176.55	5	62.68	8	113.87
9	Camille Kovalev; Pavel Kovalev	France	167.63	8	57.13	9	110.50
10	Daria Danilova; Michel Tsiba	Netherlands	166.84	11	56.52	10	110.32
11	Sofiia Holichenko; Artem Darenskyi	Ukraine	164.95	10	56.73	11	108.22
12	Letizia Roscher; Luis Schuster	Germany	158.15	12	55.18	13	102.97
13	Oxana Vouillamoz; Tom Bouvart	Switzerland	157.61	13	54.62	12	102.99
14	Milania Väänänen; Filippo Clerici	Finland	151.92	16	51.68	14	100.24
15	Irma Caldara; Riccardo Maglio	Italy	150.53	14	53.75	15	96.78
16	Sophia Schaller; Livio Mayr	Austria	142.31	15	52.11	16	90.20
17	Greta Crafoord; John Crafoord	Sweden	49.14	17	49.14	Did not advance to free skate	
18	Júlía Sylvía Gunnarsdóttir; Manuel Piazza	Iceland	48.58	18	48.58	Did not advance to free skate	

=== Ice dance ===
Elizabeth Tkachenko and Alexei Kiliakov of Israel withdrew prior to the rhythm dance due to Kiliakov's injury after an accident sustained in practice.

Ice dance results
Rank	Team	Nation	Total	RD		FD	
1st place, gold medalist(s)	Charlène Guignard; Marco Fabbri	Italy	212.12	1	84.23	1	127.89
2nd place, silver medalist(s)	Evgeniia Lopareva; Geoffrey Brissaud	France	206.76	2	82.75	4	124.01
3rd place, bronze medalist(s)	Lilah Fear; Lewis Gibson	Great Britain	206.02	3	81.57	2	124.45
4	Juulia Turkkila; Matthias Versluis	Finland	205.69	4	81.26	3	124.43
5	Olivia Smart; Tim Dieck	Spain	198.98	7	76.13	5	122.85
6	Allison Reed; Saulius Ambrulevičius	Lithuania	196.66	5	78.67	7	117.99
7	Yuka Orihara; Juho Pirinen	Finland	193.94	8	75.70	6	118.24
8	Diana Davis; Gleb Smolkin	Georgia	190.15	10	73.82	8	116.33
9	Loïcia Demougeot; Théo le Mercier	France	190.01	6	76.14	10	113.87
10	Natálie Taschlerová; Filip Taschler	Czech Republic	188.49	11	73.44	9	115.05
11	Jennifer Janse van Rensburg; Benjamin Steffan	Germany	186.87	9	75.45	11	111.42
12	Kateřina Mrázková; Daniel Mrázek	Czech Republic	181.67	12	70.26	12	111.41
13	Phebe Bekker; James Hernandez	Great Britain	176.02	13	68.13	13	107.89
14	Mariia Ignateva; Danijil Szemko	Hungary	172.80	14	67.10	14	105.70
15	Victoria Manni; Carlo Röthlisberger	Italy	169.14	16	65.46	15	103.68
16	Natacha Lagouge; Arnaud Caffa	France	167.09	15	65.60	16	101.49
17	Milla Ruud Reitan; Nikolaj Majorov	Sweden	162.24	17	62.19	18	100.05
18	Carolane Soucisse; Shane Firus	Ireland	161.76	19	61.56	17	100.20
19	Paulina Ramanauskaitė; Deividas Kizala	Lithuania	157.06	18	61.56	19	95.50
20	Mariia Pinchuk; Mykyta Pogorielov	Ukraine	155.98	20	60.69	20	95.29
21	Angelina Kudryavtseva; Ilia Karankevich	Cyprus	59.38	21	59.38	Did not advance to free dance	
22	Mária Sofia Pucherová; Nikita Lysak	Slovakia	56.24	22	56.24	Did not advance to free dance	
23	Gina Zehnder; Beda Leon Sieber	Switzerland	53.44	23	53.44	Did not advance to free dance	
24	Sofiia Dovhal; Wiktor Kulesza	Poland	52.52	24	52.52	Did not advance to free dance	
25	Samantha Ritter; Daniel Brykalov	Azerbaijan	51.56	25	51.56	Did not advance to free dance	
26	Emilia Monika Ziobrowska; Shiloh Douglas Judd	Romania	49.37	26	49.37	Did not advance to free dance	
27	Katarina DelCamp; Berk Akalın	Turkey	48.92	27	48.92	Did not advance to free dance	
28	Hanna Jakucs; Alessio Galli	Netherlands	48.76	28	48.76	Did not advance to free dance	
29	Kristina Dobroserdova; Alessandro Pellegrini	Armenia	48.30	29	48.30	Did not advance to free dance	
WD	Elizabeth Tkachenko; Alexei Kiliakov	Israel	Withdrew from competition				
