= Wiktor Kulesza =

Polish ice dancer (born 2003)

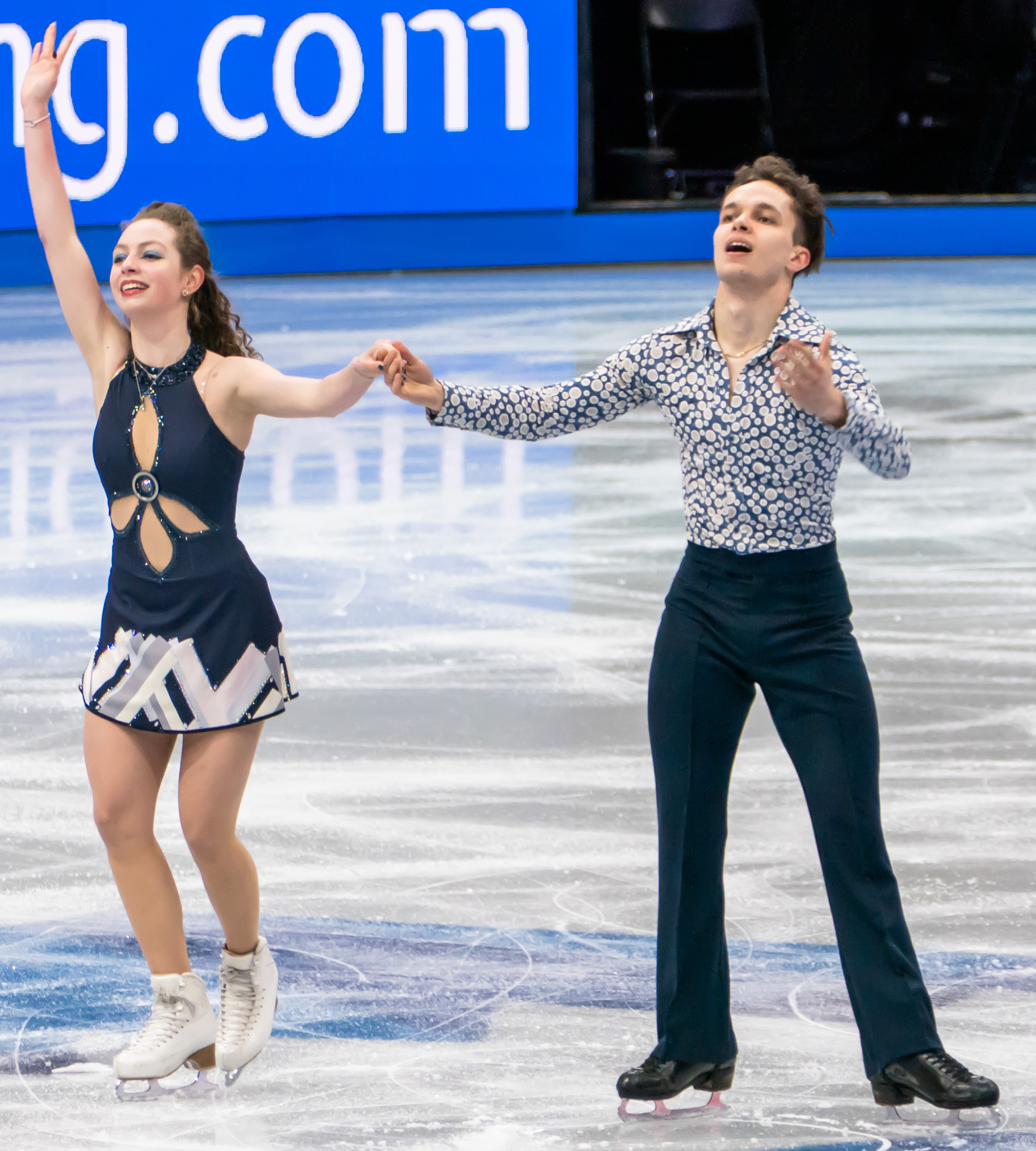
- Sofiia Dovhal and Wiktor Kulesza at the 2025 World Championships

Personal information
- Born: 28 August 2003 (age 23) Toruń, Poland
- Home town: Toruń, Poland
- Height: 1.71 m (5 ft 7 in)

Figure skating career
- Country: Poland
- Discipline: Ice dance
- Partner: Sofiia Dovhal (since 2020); Martyna Stańkowska (2016–19)
- Coach: Sylwia Nowak-Trębacka; Maksym Spodyriev; Daria Popova; Austin Wild Tomczyk
- Skating club: ICEskatERA
- Began skating: 2014

Medal record
Representing Poland
Polish Championships
Gold medal – first place	2025 Cieszyn	Ice dance
Gold medal – first place	2026 Presov	Ice dance
Silver medal – second place	2024 Turnov	Ice dance

Wiktor Kulesza (born 28 August 2003) is a Polish ice dancer who currently competes with Sofiia Dovhal. Together, they are two-time Polish national champions (2025–2026) and the 2025 Maria Olszewska Memorial silver medalists. At the junior level, they are two-time Polish junior national champions (2023–24).

In addition, the team represented Poland at the 2026 Winter Olympics.

== Personal life ==
Kulesza was born on 28 August 2003 in Toruń, Poland. Prior to ice dancing, Kulesza played tennis as a child. In 2022, he enrolled at the Halina Konopacka University of Physical Education and Tourism.

== Career ==
Kulesza began learning how to skate in 2014 at the age of eleven. He initially attended lessons that were one hour per week before deciding that he wanted to take more frequent classes. His mother, in turn, contacted the MKS Axel Toruń Skating Club, arranging Kulesza to train there under coach, Sylwia Nowak-Trębacka. He first began competing in the ice dance discipline in 2016 with Martyna Stańkowska and competed on the novice level with her until their partnership ended in early 2019.

=== Partnership with Sofiia Dovhal ===
During the summer of 2019, Kulesza attended a training camp in Cetniewo, Władysławowo with coach, Sylwia Nowak-Trębacka. While there, they met partnerless Ukrainian ice dancer, Sofiia Dovhal. At the encouragement of Nowak-Trębacka, Dovhal and Kulesza decided to team up and represent Poland under the continued guidance of Nowak-Trębacka in Toruń.

The team officially debuted at the 2021 Four National Championships, where they won the bronze medal on the junior level.

==== 2021–22 season ====
Dovhal/Kulesza opened their season by making their junior international debut at 2021 JGP Poland. They followed this up by finishing seventh at the 2021 Mezzaluna Cup before closing their season with a fifth-place finish at the 2021 Victor Petrenko Cup.

==== 2022–23 season ====
Dovhal/Kulesza started their season by competing on the 2022–23 Junior Grand Prix series, finishing fourteenth at both 2022 JGP Poland I and 2022 JGP Poland II. They then continued to compete on the international junior level, winning gold at the 2022 Budapest Trophy, finishing sixth at the 2022 NRW Trophy, and winning silver at the 2022 Bosphorus Cup.

In December, Dovhal/Kulesza won the silver medal on the junior level at the 2023 Four National Championships. They went on to compete 2023 World Junior Championships in Calgary, Alberta, Canada, finishing in twenty-third place.

==== 2023–24 season ====
Dovhal/Kulesza began their season by competing on the 2023–24 Junior Grand Prix series, finishing seventh at 2023 JGP Turkey and ninth at 2022 JGP Poland. Going on to continue competing at the junior level, they won the silver medal at the 2023 Budapest Trophy and placed fifth at the 2023 Mezzaluna Cup.

Dovhal/Kulesza then made their senior international debut by competing on the 2023–24 Challenger Series, finishing seventh at the 2023 CS Denis Ten Memorial Challenge and twelfth at the 2023 CS Warsaw Cup. They followed up these results by placing seventh at the 2023 Bosphorus Cup.

In December, Dovhal/Kulesza competed on the senior level at the 2024 Four National Championships, where they finished sixth overall. The following month, they made their senior championship debut at the 2024 European Championships in Kaunas, Lithuania, finishing in twenty-sixth place overall. One week later, Dovhal/Kulesza won the gold medal at the 2024 Polish Junior Championships and the week after that, finished fourth at the 2024 Ephesus Cup on the senior level.

Dovhal/Kulesza ultimately closed the season with a nineteenth-place finish at the 2024 World Junior Championships in Taipei, Taiwan.

==== 2024–25 season ====
Prior to the season, Dovhal/Kulesza moved their training location to Bydgoszcz to train at the ICEskatERA Torbyd Ice Rink.

Dovhal/Kulesza started their season by competing on the 2024–25 Junior Grand Prix series, finishing ninth at 2024 JGP Latvia and fifth at 2024 JGP Poland. They then competed on the senior level, finishing fifth at the 2024 Denkova-Staviski Cup, thirteenth at the 2024 CS Tallinn Trophy, thirteenth at the 2024 CS Warsaw Cup, and ninth at the 2024 Bosphorus Cup.

In December, Dovhal/Kulesza finished sixth at the 2025 Four National Championships. The following month, they competed at the 2025 Winter World University Games and the 2025 European Championships, finishing eleventh and twenty-fourth, respectively. They subsequently followed up these results by winning silver at the 2025 Maria Olszewska Memorial.

Dovhal/Kulesza then finished the season by making their World Championship debut in Boston, Massachusetts, United States, placing thirty-fourth overall.

==== 2025–26 season: Milano Cortina Olympics ====
Dovhal/Kulesza opened their season with a fourteenth-place finish at the ISU Skate to Milano. They subsequently went on to finish eleventh at the 2025 CS Trialeti Trophy, seventh at the 2025 Denkova-Staviski Cup, seventeenth at the 2025 CS Warsaw Cup, and twelfth at the 2025 Bosphorus Cup.

In December, Dovhal/Kulesza finished fourth at the 2026 Four National Championships. The following month, the team finished in twenty-fifth place at the 2026 European Championships in Sheffield, England, United Kingdom.

Less than two weeks before the start of the 2026 Winter Olympics, the Winter Sports Association of Uzbekistan had reliquinshed their sole Olympic pair skating spot. This, in turn, allowed the Polish Figure Skating Association to use two additional athlete quotas in order to complete a team for Poland for the upcoming Olympic Figure Skating Team Event. Dovhal/Kulesza were ultimately granted those quotas.

On 6 February, Dovhal/Kulesza competed in the rhythm dance segment of the 2026 Winter Olympic Figure Skating Team Event. They placed tenth and scored a personal best. "I really, really had such powerful emotions at the end of the skate," said Dovhal following their performance. "It honestly feels like a dream come true. My emotions were so big. I’m so thankful to every coach, to my partner, and to all the friends who supported us. It’s a really beautiful moment that we shared together."

The following week, the team finished fifth at the 2026 Finnish Ice Dance Open.

== Programs ==
=== Ice dance with Sofiia Dovhal ===
Season	Short dance/Rhythm dance	Free dance
2025–2026	Gonna Make You Sweat (Everybody Dance Now) by C+C Music Factory ft. Freedom Williams; RITMO (Bad Boys For Life) by Black Eyed Peas & J Balvin; Rhythm of the Night by Skytech, Vion Konger, & R3hab choreo. by Charlie White	Westworld; Main Title Theme - Westworld; Paint It, Black; Runaway; Heart-Shaped Box (Piano) by Ramin Djawadi choreo. by Charlie White
2024–2025	And the Beat Goes On by The Whispers; Y.M.C.A. by Village People choreo. by Sylwia Nowak-Trebacka, Maksym Spodyriev	Pilgrims on a Long Journey by Cœur de pirate; Torn Redux (from High Strung) by Nathan Lanier choreo. by Sylwia Nowak-Trebacka, Maksym Spodyriev
2023–2024	Wake Me Up Before You Go-Go by Wham!; Only You by Savage choreo. by Sylwia Nowak-Trebacka	The Phantom of the Opera; Overture - Hannibal by Andrew Lloyd Webber; The Music of the Night performed by Gerard Butler; The Point of No Return performed by Gerard Butler & Emmy Rossum choreo. by Sylwia Nowak-Trebacka
2022–2023	Tango: Easy Virtue Tango (from Easy Virtue) by Sophie Solomon, Perry Montague-Mason, Ian Watson, & The Easy Virtue Orchestra; Flamenco: Farrucas by Pepe Romero, Chano Lobato, Maria Magdalena, & Paco Romero choreo. by Sylwia Nowak-Trebacka	Comptine d'un autre été: L'Après-midi (from Amélie) by Yann Tiersen; Lose Yourself (from 8 Mile by Eminem; J'y suis jamais allé (from Amélie) by Yann Tiersen choreo. by Sylwia Nowak-Trebacka
2022–2023	Blues: Earth Song; Blues: Thriller by Michael Jackson choreo. by Sylwia Nowak-Trebacka, Lloyd Jones	Triveni; Diablo Rojo by Rodrigo y Gabriela choreo. by Sylwia Nowak-Trebacka, Lloyd Jones

== Competitive highlights ==
- JGP – Event of the ISU Junior Grand Prix Series
- CS – Event of the ISU Challenger Series
- TBD – Assigned
- WD – Withdrew from competition
- Medals at team events are awarded for the team results only. Individual placements at team events are listed in parentheses.

=== Ice dance with Sofiia Dovhal ===
Competition placements at senior level
Season	2023–24	2024–25	2025–26
Winter Olympics (Team event)			10th
World Championships		34th	
European Championships	26th	24th	25th
Polish Championships	2nd	1st	1st
Four Nationals Championships	6th	6th	4th
CS Denis Ten Memorial	7th		
CS Tallinn Trophy		13th	
CS Trialeti Trophy			11th
CS Warsaw Cup	12th	13th	17th
Bosphorus Cup	7th	9th	12th
Denkova-Staviski Cup		5th	7th
Ephesus Cup	4th		
Finnish Ice Dance Open			5th
Maria Olszewska Memorial		2nd	2nd
Skate to Milano			14th
Winter University Games		11th	

Competition placements at junior level
Season	2020–21	2021–22	2022–23	2023–24	2024–25
World Junior Championships			23rd	19th	
Polish Championships	2nd		1st	1st	
Four Nationals Championships	3rd		2nd		
JGP Latvia					9th
JGP Poland I		15th	14th	9th	5th
JGP Poland II			14th		
JGP Turkey				7th	
Bosphorus Cup			2nd	7th	
Budapest Trophy			1st	2nd	
Mezzaluna Cup		7th		5th	
NRW Trophy			6th		
Victor Petrenko Cup		5th			

== Detailed results ==
=== Ice dance with Sofiia Dovhal ===
ISU personal best scores in the +5/-5 GOE System
Segment	Type	Score	Event
Total	TSS	156.82	2025 CS Warsaw Cup
Rhythm dance	TSS	60.23	2026 Winter Olympics (Team event)
Rhythm dance	TES	34.48	2023 CS Denis Ten Memorial Challenge
Rhythm dance	PCS	27.22	2026 Winter Olympics (Team event)
Free dance	TSS	96.77	2025 CS Warsaw Cup
Free dance	TES	55.67	2025 CS Warsaw Cup
Free dance	PCS	41.10	2025 CS Warsaw Cup

=== Senior results ===
Results in the 2023–24 season
Date	Event	RD		FD		Total	
Date	Event	P	Score	P	Score	P	Score
Nov 2–5, 2023	(Kazakhstan) 2023 CS Denis Ten Memorial Challenge	9	58.55	6	89.17	7	147.17
Nov 16–19, 2023	(Poland) 2023 CS Warsaw Cup	14	56.01	10	91.82	12	147.83
Nov 27 – Dec 3, 2023	(Turkey) 2023 Bosphorus Cup	8	61.74	8	98.36	7	160.10
Dec 14–16, 2023	(Czech Republic) 2024 Four Nationals Championships	9	56.54	6	89.64	6	146.18
Dec 14–16, 2023	(Czech Republic) 2024 Polish Championships (Note: The Polish Championships are contested as part of the Four Nationals Championships.)	2	—N/a	2	—N/a	2	—N/a
Jan 8–14, 2024	(Lithuania) 2024 European Championships	26	54.96	—N/a	—N/a	26	54.96
Jan 25–28, 2024	(Turkey) 2024 Ephesus Cup	4	62.44	4	92.56	4	155.00

Results in the 2024–25 season
Date	Event	RD		FD		Total	
Date	Event	P	Score	P	Score	P	Score
Nov 5–10, 2024	(Bulgaria) 2024 Denkova-Staviski Cup	5	60.48	5	96.58	5	157.06
Nov 12–17, 2024	(Estonia) 2024 CS Tallinn Trophy	14	53.67	12	88.71	13	142.38
Nov 20–24, 2024	(Poland) 2024 CS Warsaw Cup	13	57.94	12	95.31	13	153.25
Nov 25 – Dec 1, 2024	(Turkey) 2024 Bosphorus Cup	11	60.03	9	93.56	9	153.59
Dec 13–14, 2024	(Poland) 2025 Four Nationals Championships	6	58.65	6	87.74	6	146.39
Dec 13–14, 2024	(Poland) 2025 Polish Championships	1	—N/a	1	—N/a	1	—N/a
Jan 16–18, 2025	(Italy) 2025 Winter World University Games	7	52.65	11	74.28	11	126.93
Jan 28 – Feb 2, 2025	(Estonia) 2025 European Championships	24	52.52	—N/a	—N/a	24	52.52
Mar 4–9, 2025	(Poland) 2025 Maria Olszewska Memorial	1	65.76	2	98.77	2	164.73
Mar 25–30, 2025	(United States) 2025 World Championships	34	51.87	—N/a	—N/a	34	51.87

Results in the 2025–26 season
Date	Event	RD		FD		Total	
Date	Event	P	Score	P	Score	P	Score
Sep 18–21, 2025	(China) 2025 Skate to Milano	14	56.43	14	85.31	14	141.74
Oct 8–11, 2025	(Georgia (country)) 2025 CS Trialeti Trophy	8	59.62	13	83.32	11	142.94
Nov 7–9, 2025	(Bulgaria) 2025 Denkova-Staviski Cup	5	63.69	9	91.10	7	154.79
Nov 19–23, 2025	(Poland) 2025 CS Warsaw Cup	17	60.05	16	96.77	17	156.82
Nov 24–30, 2025	(Turkey) 2025 Bosphorus Cup	7	60.83	13	86.80	12	147.63
Dec 11–13, 2025	(Slovakia) 2026 Four Nationals Championships	4	60.00	5	88.21	4	148.21
Dec 11–13, 2025	(Slovakia) 2026 Polish Championships	1	—N/a	1	—N/a	1	—N/a
Jan 13–18, 2026	(United Kingdom) 2026 European Championships	25	53.34	—N/a	—N/a	25	53.34
Feb 6–8, 2026	(Italy) 2026 Winter Olympics – Team event	10	60.23	—N/a	—N/a	10	—N/a
Feb 14–15, 2026	(Finland) 2026 Finnish Ice Dance Open	3	61.00	8	83.59	5	144.59
Feb 24-28, 2026	(Poland) 2026 Maria Olszewska Memorial	1	64.20	2	91.02	2	155.22

=== Junior results ===
Results in the 2020–21 season
Date	Event	SP		FS		Total	
Date	Event	P	Score	P	Score	P	Score
Dec 10–12, 2020	(Poland) 2021 Four Nationals Championships	3	43.55	3	74.82	3	118.37
Dec 10–12, 2020	(Poland) 2021 Polish Junior Championships (Note: The Polish Championships are contested as part of the Four Nationals Championships.)	2	—N/a	2	—N/a	2	—N/a

Results in the 2021–22 season
Date	Event	RD		FD		Total	
Date	Event	P	Score	P	Score	P	Score
Sep 29 – Oct 2, 2021	2021 JGP Poland	15	45.54	14	67.70	15	113.24
Oct 15–17, 2021	(Italy) 2021 Mezzaluna Cup	7	49.95	7	78.11	7	128.06
Oct 20–24, 2021	(Ukraine) 2021 Victor Petrenko Cup	5	54.27	5	80.05	5	134.32

Results in the 2022–23 season
Date	Event	RD		FD		Total	
Date	Event	P	Score	P	Score	P	Score
Sep 28 – Oct 1, 2022	2022 JGP Poland I	11	51.03	16	70.63	14	121.66
Oct 5–8, 2022	2022 JGP Poland II	16	46.39	14	75.25	14	121.64
Oct 13–16, 2022	(Hungary) 2022 Budapest Trophy	1	48.73	1	71.44	1	120.17
Nov 24–27, 2022	(Germany) 2022 NRW Trophy	6	51.77	5	82.38	5	134.15
Nov 29 – Dec 3, 2022	(Turkey) 2023 Bosphorus Cup	2	58.97	2	92.27	2	151.24
Dec 16–18, 2022	(Hungary) 2023 Four Nationals Championships	2	56.34	2	83.13	2	139.47
Dec 16–18, 2022	(Hungary) 2023 Polish Junior Championships	1	—N/a	1	—N/a	1	—N/a
Feb 27 – Mar 5, 2023	(Canada) 2023 World Junior Championships	23	49.16	—N/a	—N/a	23	49.16

Results in the 2023–24 season
Date	Event	RD		FD		Total	
Date	Event	P	Score	P	Score	P	Score
Sep 6–9, 2023	2023 JGP Turkey	9	50.32	7	77.81	7	128.13
Sep 27–30, 2023	2023 JGP Poland	8	52.12	9	75.27	9	127.39
Oct 13–15, 2023	(Hungary) 2023 Budapest Trophy	1	53.03	2	79.57	2	132.60
Oct 20–22, 2023	(Italy) 2023 Mezzaluna Cup	5	57.98	5	85.34	5	143.32
Jan 19–21, 2024	(Poland) 2024 Polish Junior Championships	1	56.48	1	79.63	1	136.11
Feb 26 – Mar 3, 2024	(Chinese Taipei) 2024 World Junior Championships	16	54.19	19	74.11	19	128.30

Results in the 2024–25 season
Date	Event	RD		FD		Total	
Date	Event	P	Score	P	Score	P	Score
Aug 28–31, 2024	2024 JGP Latvia	9	52.54	9	72.32	9	124.86
Sep 25–28, 2024	2024 JGP Poland	5	56.26	9	80.27	5	136.53
