= Anna Valesi =

Italian-Czech pair skater (born 2002)

- Valesi at the 2026 World Championships

Personal information
- Born: 9 June 2002 (age 24) Como, Italy
- Home town: Cassina Rizzardi, Italy
- Height: 1.58 m (5 ft 2 in)

Figure skating career
- Country: Czech Republic (since 2025); Italy (2016–25)
- Discipline: Pair skating
- Partner: Martin Bidař (since 2025); Manuel Piazza (2021–24); Filippo Clerici (2020–21)
- Coach: Ondřej Hotárek
- Skating club: ASGA Como
- Began skating: 2006

Medal record
Representing Czech Republic
Czech Championships
| Gold medal – first place | 2026 Presov | Pairs |
Representing Italy
Italian Championships
| Bronze medal – third place | 2024 Pinerolo | Pairs |

Anna Valesi (born 9 June 2002) is an Italian pair skater who currently represents the Czech Republic. With her current partner, Martin Bidař, she is the 2026 Czech National champion.

With her former partner, Manuel Piazza, she is the 2024 Italian national bronze medalist and has won seven senior international medals, including silver at the 2022 Bavarian Open.

== Career ==
=== Early years ===
Valesi began learning to skate in 2006. As a singles skater, she competed internationally in the junior ranks from March 2018 through March 2019.

Skating in partnership with Filippo Clerici, she took silver in the pairs event at the Italian Junior Championships in April 2021.

=== Partnership with Manuel Piazza for Italy ===
==== 2021–22 season: Debut of Valesi/Piazza ====
In the 2021–22 season, Valesi began competing in the senior ranks with Manuel Piazza. Making their international debut, Valesi/Piazza took bronze at the Tayside Trophy in November 2021. The following month, they placed fourth at the Italian Championships.

In January 2022, Valesi/Piazza were awarded silver medals at two events – the Icelab International Cup and Bavarian Open.

==== 2022–23 season: Grand Prix debut ====
In September 2022, Valesi/Piazza won bronze at the Lombardia Trophy and placed seventh at the 2022 CS Nebelhorn Trophy. In October, they were invited to their first Grand Prix event, the 2022 Skate America, where they finished fifth. They were seventh at the 2022 Grand Prix of Espoo.

==== 2023–24 season: End of Valesi/Piazza ====
Beginning the international season at the John Nicks Pairs Challenge, where they won the silver. They next competed at the 2023 CS Nebelhorn Trophy, Valesi/Piazza finished ninth. They next competed at the 2023 Diamond Spin, where they won the bronze.

On the Grand Prix, they came sixth at their lone initial assignment, the 2023 Grand Prix de France. They were subsequently invited to the 2023 Cup of China, following the withdrawal of Americans Chan/Howe. They were sixth at that event as well.

Valesi/Piazza continued to the 2024 Italian Figure Skating Championships, where they won the bronze medal. They were assigned to the 2024 Bavarian Open, but withdrew prior to the competition. It June, it was confirmed that the pair had split.

=== Partnership with Martin Bidař for the Czech Republic ===
==== 2024–25 season: Debut of Valesi/Bidař ====
In January 2025, it was announced that Valesi had teamed up with Czech pair skater, Martin Bidař, and that they would represent the Czech Republic. Valesi/Bidař made their debut as a pair at the 2025 Merano Ice Trophy in mid-February, where they won the silver medal.

==== 2025–26 season: European and World Championships debut ====
Valesi/Bidař opened their season by winning bronze at the 2025 Lombardia Trophy. They then went on to finish seventh at the ISU Skate to Milano, winning silver at the 2025 Tayside Trophy, and winning gold at the 2025 Cup of Innsbruck.

In December, Valesi/Bidař finished fifth at the 2025 CS Golden Spin of Zagreb and winning silver at the 2026 Four National Championships. The following month, they competed at the 2026 European Championships in Sheffield, England, United Kingdom. The pair placed twelfth in the short program and seventh in the free skate, moving up to ninth place overall. "I don’t know what to say right now and how I’m feeling," shared Valesi following their free skate. "I am feeling super emotional. Like me and Martin, we know how much work we put into it, how much we believed in it, and always tried to have a good feeling between each other. So today was like amazing overall. The public, the feeling between us, the coaches, the support from everybody, we feel very, very good." Bidař added, "For me, it’s a really important part is that even in a hard time, we really stay together. We are very happy that it paid off today and we really enjoyed it from the morning on the whole day."

== Programs ==
=== With Bidař ===
| Season | Short program | Free skating |
|---|---|---|
| 2025–26 | Suite bergamasque, L. 75: III. Clair de lune by Claude Debussy performed by Philippe Entremont | Notre-Dame de Paris by Luc Plamondon, Riccardo Cocciante, Jannick Top, & Serge Perathoner; Le temps des cathédrales performed by Bruno Pelletier; Danse mon Esmeralda performed by Garou |
| 2024–25 | Suite bergamasque, L. 75: III. Clair de lune by Claude Debussy performed by Philippe Entremont | Notre-Dame de Paris by Luc Plamondon, Riccardo Cocciante, Jannick Top, & Serge Perathoner; Le temps des cathédrales performed by Bruno Pelletier; Danse mon Esmeralda performed by Garou |

=== With Piazza ===
| Season | Short program | Free skating |
|---|---|---|
| 2023–24 | The Loneliest by Måneskin choreo. by Luca Lanotte | Chasing Cars by Snow Patrol performed by Sleeping At Last, Tommee Profitt, & Fleurie choreo. by Anna Cappellini, Luca Lanotte |
| 2022–23 | La La Land by Justin Hurwitz choreo. by Anna Cappellini, Luca Lanotte | Chasing Cars by Snow Patrol performed by Sleeping At Last, Tommee Profitt, & Fleurie choreo. by Anna Cappellini, Luca Lanotte |

== Competitive highlights ==
- GP – Event of the ISU Grand Prix Series
- CS – Event of the ISU Challenger Series
- WD – Withdrew from competition

=== Pair skating with Martin Bidař (for Czech Republic) ===
Competition placements at senior level
| Season | 2024–25 | 2025–26 | 2026–27 |
|---|---|---|---|
| World Championships | | 15th | |
| European Championships | | 9th | |
| Czech Championships | | 1st | |
| Four Nationals Championships | | 2nd | |
| GP NHK Trophy | | | TBD |
| GP Skate Canada International | | | 4th |
| CS Golden Spin of Zagreb | | 5th | |
| CS Nebelhorn Trophy | | | 8th |
| Cup of Innsbruck | | 1st | |
| Lombardia Trophy | | 3rd | |
| Merano Ice Trophy | 2nd | | |
| Skate to Milano | | 7th | |
| Tayside Trophy | | 2nd | 3rd |

=== Pair skating with Manuel Piazza (for Italy) ===
Competition placements at senior level
| Season | 2021–22 | 2022–23 | 2023–24 |
|---|---|---|---|
| Italian Championships | 4th | | 3rd |
| GP Cup of China | | | 6th |
| GP Finland | | 7th | |
| GP France | | | 6th |
| GP Skate America | | 5th | |
| CS Nebelhorn Trophy | | 7th | 9th |
| CS Warsaw Cup | | 5th | |
| Bavarian Open | 2nd | | |
| Challenge Cup | | 8th | |
| Diamond Spin | | | 3rd |
| IceLab Cup | 2nd | | |
| John Nicks Pairs | | | 2nd |
| Lombardia Trophy | | 3rd | |
| Tayside Trophy | 3rd | 3rd | |

=== Pair skating with Clerici (for Italy) ===
Competition placements at junior level
| Season | 2020-21 |
|---|---|
| Italian Championships | 2nd |

=== Single skating ===
International: Junior
| Event | 2016–17 | 2017–18 | 2018–19 |
|---|---|---|---|
| Bavarian Open | | | 10th II |
| Coppa Europa | | 6th | |
| Egna Trophy | | | 14th |
| Tallinn Trophy | | | 9th |
International: Advanced novice
| Coupe du Printemps | 15th | | |
| Egna Trophy | 4th | | |
National
| Italian Championships | | 17th J | 6th J |
J = Junior level

== Detailed results ==
ISU personal best scores in the +5/-5 GOE System
| Segment | Type | Score | Event |
|---|---|---|---|
| Total | TSS | 170.46 | 2026 World Championships |
| Short program | TSS | 60.44 | 2026 Skate Canada International |
| Short program | TES | 32.95 | 2025 CS Golden Spin of Zagreb |
| Short program | PCS | 27.79 | 2026 CS Nebelhorn Trophy |
| Free skating | TSS | 113.88 | 2026 World Championships |
| Free skating | TES | 61.34 | 2026 World Championships |
| Free skating | PCS | 55.03 | 2026 Skate Canada International |

=== Pair skating with Martin Bidař (for Czech Republic) ===
Results in the 2024–25 season
| Date | Event | SP | | FS | | Total | |
| Date | Event | P | Score | P | Score | P | Score |
|---|---|---|---|---|---|---|---|
| Feb 13–16, 2025 | (Italy) 2025 Merano Ice Trophy | 5 | 51.13 | 1 | 110.35 | 2 | 161.48 |

Results in the 2025–26 season
| Date | Event | SP | | FS | | Total | |
| Date | Event | P | Score | P | Score | P | Score |
|---|---|---|---|---|---|---|---|
| Sep 11–14, 2025 | (Italy) 2025 Lombardia Trophy | 3 | 58.10 | 3 | 112.47 | 3 | 170.57 |
| Sep 18–21, 2025 | (China) 2025 ISU Skate to Milano | 5 | 57.17 | 7 | 98.94 | 7 | 156.11 |
| Oct 11–12, 2025 | (United Kingdom) 2025 Tayside Trophy | 5 | 62.87 | 2 | 119.60 | 2 | 182.47 |
| Nov 13–16, 2025 | (Austria) 2025 Cup of Innsbruck | 1 | 64.10 | 1 | 106.99 | 1 | 171.09 |
| Dec 3–6, 2025 | (Croatia) 2025 CS Golden Spin of Zagreb | 7 | 58.42 | 5 | 110.10 | 5 | 168.52 |
| Dec 11–13, 2025 | (Slovakia) 2026 Four Nationals Championships | 3 | 62.30 | 2 | 113.48 | 2 | 175.78 |
| Dec 11–13, 2025 | (Czech Republic) 2026 Czech Championships (Note: The Czech Championships are contested as part of the Four Nationals Championships.) | 1 | —N/a | 1 | —N/a | 1 | —N/a |
| Jan 13–18, 2026 | (United Kingdom) 2026 European Championships | 12 | 53.80 | 7 | 113.62 | 9 | 167.42 |
| Mar 24–29, 2026 | (Czech Republic) 2026 World Championships | 20 | 56.58 | 13 | 113.88 | 15 | 170.46 |

Results in the 2026–27 season
| Date | Event | SP | | FS | | Total | |
| Date | Event | P | Score | P | Score | P | Score |
|---|---|---|---|---|---|---|---|
| Sep 24–26, 2026 | (Germany) 2026 CS Nebelhorn Trophy | 5 | 59.30 | 11 | 92.42 | 8 | 151.72 |
| Oct 10-11, 2026 | (United Kingdom) 2026 Tayside Trophy | 6 | 54.64 | 2 | 102.95 | 3 | 157.59 |
| Oct 30 - Nov 1, 2026 | 2026 Skate Canada International | 5 | 60.44 | 4 | 106.22 | 4 | 166.66 |
