= Manuel Piazza =

Italian pair skater (born 1999)

Personal information
- Born: 13 October 1999 (age 26) Bolzano, Italy
- Home town: Urtijëi, Italy
- Height: 1.85 m (6 ft 1 in)

Figure skating career
- Country: Iceland (since 2024); Italy (2015–24)
- Discipline: Pair skating (since 2018); Men's singles (2015–18)
- Partner: Júlía Sylvía Gunnarsdóttir (2024–26); Anna Valesi (2021–24); Alyssa Montan (2018–20)
- Coach: Ondřej Hotárek; Rosanna Murante; Benjamin Naggiar
- Skating club: IceLab Bergamo
- Began skating: 2006

Medal record
Representing Iceland
Icelandic Championships
Gold medal – first place	2024 Reykjavík	Pairs
Gold medal – first place	2025 Reykjavík	Pairs
Representing Italy
Italian Championships
Bronze medal – third place	2024 Pinerolo	Pairs

Manuel Piazza (born 13 October 1999) is an Italian pair skater. Competing for Iceland with his former partner, Júlía Sylvía Gunnarsdóttir, he is the 2025 Diamond Spin champion, 2025 Cup of Innsbruck bronze medalist, 2024 NRW Trophy bronze medalist and a two-time Icelandic national champion (2025–26). Gunnarsdóttir and Piazza are the first pairs team to represent Iceland in international competition.

With his former partner, Anna Valesi, he is the 2024 Italian national bronze medalist and has won seven senior international medals, including silver at the 2022 Bavarian Open.

== Career ==
=== Early years ===
Piazza began learning to skate in 2006. He placed sixth in junior men's singles at the Italian Championships in December 2016 and again in December 2017.

In 2018, he teamed up with Alyssa Montan to compete in junior pairs. Making their international debut, Montan/Piazza won silver at the Inge Solar Memorial – Alpen Trophy in November 2018. The following month, they took silver in the junior event at the Italian Championships.

In their second and final season together, Montan/Piazza won the Italian national junior title and placed 16th at the 2020 World Junior Championships in Tallinn, Estonia. The two were coached by Ondřej Hotárek, Luca Demattè, and Franca Bianconi in Bergamo, Italy.

=== Pair skating with Anna Valesi for Italy ===
==== 2021–22 season: Debut of Valesi/Piazza ====
In the 2021–22 season, Piazza began competing in the senior ranks with Anna Valesi. Making their international debut, Valesi/Piazza took bronze at the Tayside Trophy in November 2021. The following month, they placed fourth at the Italian Championships.

In January 2022, Valesi/Piazza were awarded silver medals at two events – the Icelab International Cup and Bavarian Open.

==== 2022–23 season: Grand Prix debut ====
In September 2022, Valesi/Piazza won bronze at the Lombardia Trophy and placed seventh at the 2022 CS Nebelhorn Trophy. In October, they were invited to their first Grand Prix event, the 2022 Skate America, where they finished fifth. They were seventh at the 2022 Grand Prix of Espoo.

==== 2023–24 season ====
Beginning the international season at the John Nicks Pairs Challenge, where they won the silver. They continued to the 2023 CS Nebelhorn Trophy, Valesi/Piazza finished ninth. They next competed at the 2023 Diamond Spin, where they won the bronze.

On the Grand Prix, they came sixth at their lone assignment, the 2023 Grand Prix de France. They were subsequently invited to the 2023 Cup of China, following the withdrawal of Americans Chan/Howe. They were sixth at that event as well.

Valesi / Piazza continued to the 2024 Italian Figure Skating Championships, where they won the bronze medal. They were assigned to the 2024 Bavarian Open, but withdrew prior to the competition. It June, it was confirmed that the pair had split.

=== Pair skating with Júlía Sylvía Gunnarsdóttir for Iceland ===
==== 2024–25 season ====
In August, it was announced that Piazza had teamed up with Júlía Sylvía Gunnarsdóttir to compete for Iceland, the first ever pair to compete internationally for Iceland. They split their training between Reykjavík, Iceland with coach Benjamin Naggiar and Bergamo, Italy with coaches, Ondřej Hotárek and Rosanna Murante.

Gunnarsdóttir/Piazza made their international debut in November 2024 at the 2024 NRW Trophy. They placed third in both the short program and the free skate to claim the bronze medal behind new Swiss team Oxana Vouillamoz / Tom Bouvart and Swedish sibling pair Greta Crafoord / John Crafoord. At their second international event, the 2024 CS Warsaw Cup, Gunnarsdóttir/Piazza placed twelfth.

Gunnarsdóttir/Piazza competed at the 2025 Icelandic Championships at the end of November unchallenged, winning their first national pairs title by default. Having earned their ISU technical minimum scores at the NRW Trophy, Gunnarsdóttir/Piazza were assigned to compete at the 2025 European Championships in Estonia in January. At Europeans, Gunnarsdóttir/Piazza scored a personal best of 48.58, placing eighteenth in the segment. They did not advance to the free skate portion of the competition.

==== 2025–26 season ====
Gunnarsdóttir/Piazza opened their season with a fourth-place finish at the 2025 Lombardia Trophy. One week later, they placed eighth at the ISU Skate to Milano.

In October, Gunnarsdóttir/Piazza competed at the 2025 Diamond Spin and the 2025 Swiss Open, winning gold and placing fifth, respectively. The following month, the pair won the bronze medal at the 2025 Cup of Innsbruck and the gold medal at the 2026 Icelandic Championships. In January, Gunnarsdóttir/Piazza placed eleventh at the 2026 European Championships, scoring personal bests in all three competition segments. Their partnership ended after this season.

== Programs ==
=== With Gunnarsdóttir ===
Season	Short program	Free skating
2025–2026	Imagine by John Lennon performed by Audiomachine choreo. by Benjamin Naggiar	West Side Story; Maria; Tonight by Leonard Bernstein & Stephen Sondheim choreo. by Benjamin Naggiar
2024–2025	Pray (from Game of Thrones) by Matt Bellamy choreo. by Benjamin Naggiar	West Side Story; Maria; Tonight by Leonard Bernstein & Stephen Sondheim choreo. by Benjamin Naggiar

=== With Valesi ===
Season	Short program	Free skating
2023–24	The Loneliest by Måneskin choreo. by Luca Lanotte	Chasing Cars by Snow Patrol performed by Sleeping at Last, Tommee Profitt, & Fleurie choreo. by Anna Cappellini, Luca Lanotte
2022–23	La La Land by Justin Hurwitz choreo. by Anna Cappellini, Luca Lanotte	Chasing Cars by Snow Patrol performed by Sleeping at Last, Tommee Profitt, & Fleurie choreo. by Anna Cappellini, Luca Lanotte

=== With Montan ===
Season	Short program	Free skating
2019–20	Thinking Out Loud by Ed Sheeran	Here We Go Again; The Winner Takes It All; Dancing Queen by ABBA

== Competitive highlights ==
- GP – Event of the ISU Grand Prix Series
- CS – Event of the ISU Challenger Series
- TBD – Assigned
- WD – Withdrew from competition

=== Pair skating with Júlía Sylvía Gunnarsdóttir (for Iceland) ===
Competition placements at senior level
Season	2024–25	2025–26
European Championships	18th	11th
Icelandic Championships	1st	1st
CS Warsaw Cup	12th	
Cup of Innsbruck		3rd
Diamond Spin		1st
Lombardia Trophy		4th
NRW Trophy	3rd	
Road to 26 Trophy	7th	
Skate to Milano		8th

=== Pair skating with Anna Valesi (for Italy) ===
Competition placements at senior level
Season	2021–22	2022–23	2023–24
Italian Championships	4th		3rd
GP Cup of China			6th
GP Finland		7th	
GP France			6th
GP Skate America		5th	
CS Nebelhorn Trophy		7th	9th
CS Warsaw Cup		5th	
Bavarian Open	2nd		
Challenge Cup		8th	
Diamond Spin			3rd
IceLab Cup	2nd		
John Nicks Pairs			2nd
Lombardia Trophy		3rd	
Tayside Trophy	3rd	3rd	

=== Pair skating with Alyssa Montan (for Italy) ===
Competition placements at junior level
Season	2018–19	2019–20	2020–21
World Junior Championships		16th	
Italian Championships	2nd	1st	1st
Alpen Trophy	2nd		
Bavarian Open	8th	3rd	
Egna Spring Trophy	1st		

=== Single skating (for Italy) ===
Competition placements at junior level
Season	2015–16	2016–17	2017–18
Italian Championships		6th	6th
Cup of Tyrol	3rd	8th	
Egna Spring Trophy	7th	6th	
Merano Cup		WD	

== Detailed results ==
=== Pair skating with Júlía Sylvía Gunnarsdóttir (for Iceland) ===
ISU personal best scores in the +5/-5 GOE System
Segment	Type	Score	Event
Total	TSS	162.62	2026 European Championships
Short program	TSS	57.45	2026 European Championships
Short program	TES	32.80	2026 European Championships
Short program	PCS	24.65	2026 European Championships
Free skating	TSS	105.17	2026 European Championships
Free skating	TES	52.83	2026 European Championships
Free skating	PCS	52.34	2026 European Championships

Results in the 2024–25 season
Date	Event	SP		FS		Total	
Date	Event	P	Score	P	Score	P	Score
Nov 13–17, 2024	(Germany) 2024 NRW Trophy	3	47.04	3	93.46	3	140.50
Nov 20–24, 2024	(Poland) 2024 CS Warsaw Cup	14	41.93	11	87.42	12	129.35
Nov 29–Dec 1, 2024	(Iceland) 2024 Icelandic Championships	1	42.30	1	95.31	1	137.61
Jan 28 – Feb 2, 2025	(Estonia) 2025 European Championships	18	48.58	—N/a	—N/a	18	48.58
Feb 18–20, 2025	(Italy) Road to 26 Trophy	6	50.54	7	87.76	7	138.30

Results in the 2025–26 season
Date	Event	SP		FS		Total	
Date	Event	P	Score	P	Score	P	Score
Sep 11–14, 2025	(Italy) 2025 Lombardia Trophy	5	53.21	4	105.70	4	158.91
Sep 18–21, 2025	(China) 2025 Skate to Milano	9	53.09	8	98.94	8	152.03
Oct 16–19, 2025	(Poland) 2025 Diamond Spin	1	48.65	1	91.75	1	140.40
Nov 13–16, 2025	(Austria) 2025 Cup of Innsbruck	6	51.72	2	102.44	3	154.16
Nov 28–30, 2025	(Iceland) 2025 Icelandic Championships	1	51.59	2	99.23	1	150.82
Jan 13–18, 2026	(United Kingdom) 2026 European Championships	9	57.45	11	105.17	11	162.62

=== Pair skating with Anna Valesi (for Italy) ===
ISU personal best scores in the +5/-5 GOE System
Segment	Type	Score	Event
Total	TSS	160.65	2023 Cup of China
Short program	TSS	55.55	2023 Cup of China
Short program	TES	30.67	2023 Grand Prix de France
Short program	PCS	26.79	2023 Cup of China
Free skating	TSS	105.10	2023 Cup of China
Free skating	TES	56.59	2023 CS Nebelhorn Trophy
Free skating	PCS	51.40	2023 Cup of China

=== Pair skating with Alyssa Montan (for Italy) ===
ISU personal best scores in the +5/-5 GOE System
Segment	Type	Score	Event
Total	TSS	116.22	2020 World Junior Championships
Short program	TSS	44.69	2020 World Junior Championships
Short program	TES	24.26	2020 World Junior Championships
Short program	PCS	20.43	2020 World Junior Championships
Free skating	TSS	71.53	2020 World Junior Championships
Free skating	TES	34.22	2020 World Junior Championships
Free skating	PCS	39.31	2020 World Junior Championships
