= Negrișoara =

Negrișoara may refer to the following rivers in Romania:

- Negrișoara, a tributary of the Dâmbovnic in Argeș County
- Negrișoara (Dorna), a tributary of the Dorna in Suceava County
- Negrișoara (Neagra Broștenilor), a tributary of the Neagra Broștenilor in Suceava County
- Negrișoara (Plapcea), a tributary of the Plapcea in Olt County
- Negrișoara, a tributary of the Sebiș in Arad County

== See also ==
- Negrea River (disambiguation)
- Neagra River (disambiguation)
- Negrinho River (disambiguation)
