= Negrea (disambiguation) =

Negrea may refer to:

- Negrea (surname)
- Negrea, a village in Hîncești District, Moldova
- Negrea, a village in the commune Schela, Galați County, Romania
- Negrea, a tributary of the Crișul Repede in Cluj County, Romania
- Negrea (Lozova), a tributary of the Lozova in Galați County, Romania
- Negrea (beetle), a genus of beetles

== See also ==
- Neagra (disambiguation)
- Neagra River (disambiguation)
