= Romanian Figure Skating Championships =

Recurring figure skating competition

- Status: Active
- Genre: National championships
- Frequency: Annual
- Country: Romania
- Inaugurated: 1924
- Organiser: Romanian Skating Federation

The Romanian Figure Skating Championships (Romanian: Campionatul național de patinaj artistic) are an annual figure skating competition organized by the Romanian Skating Federation (Romanian: Federația Română de Patinaj) to crown the national champions of Romania. The original Romanian Skating Federation was founded in 1924, but was dissolved in 2018 due to financial irregularities. Without a national federation, skaters relied on their local skating clubs to arrange financing from the Romanian Olympic and Sports Committee, as well as to schedule international competitions. In 2025, Maria Coroamă oversaw the resurrection of the national skating federation; the impetus was Julia Sauter qualifying to compete for Romania at the 2026 Winter Olympics. The Romanian Skating Federation was officially reconstituted in May 2026 and Coroamă was named the federation's president.

The first national championships were held in 1924 in Bucharest and featured events in figure skating, speed skating, and ice hockey. Early competitions were periodically interrupted due to unfavorable weather conditions, as skating events were held outdoors and depended on lakes or rinks being suitably frozen. No competitions were held from 1941 to 1945 or from 1947 to 1948 due to World War II. Since 2000, the Romanian Championships have often been held in conjunction with the Crystal Skate of Romania, Romania's marquee figure skating competition. The top Romanian competitors at this competition are recognized as the Romanian national champions. In 2024 and 2025, the junior championships were held in conjunction with the EduSport Trophy. In 2026, the senior championships were held in conjunction with Skate Fehérvár in Székesfehérvár, Hungary.

Medals are awarded in men's and women's singles at the senior and junior levels, although each discipline may not necessarily be held every year due to a lack of participants. There has not been competition in pair skating in Romania since 1993. Cornel Gheorghe holds the record for winning the most Romanian Championship titles in men's singles (with eleven), Roxana Luca and Julia Sauter are tied for winning the most titles in women's singles (with ten each), and Irina Timcic and Alfred Eisenbeisser hold the record in pair skating (with seven).

== Senior medalists ==
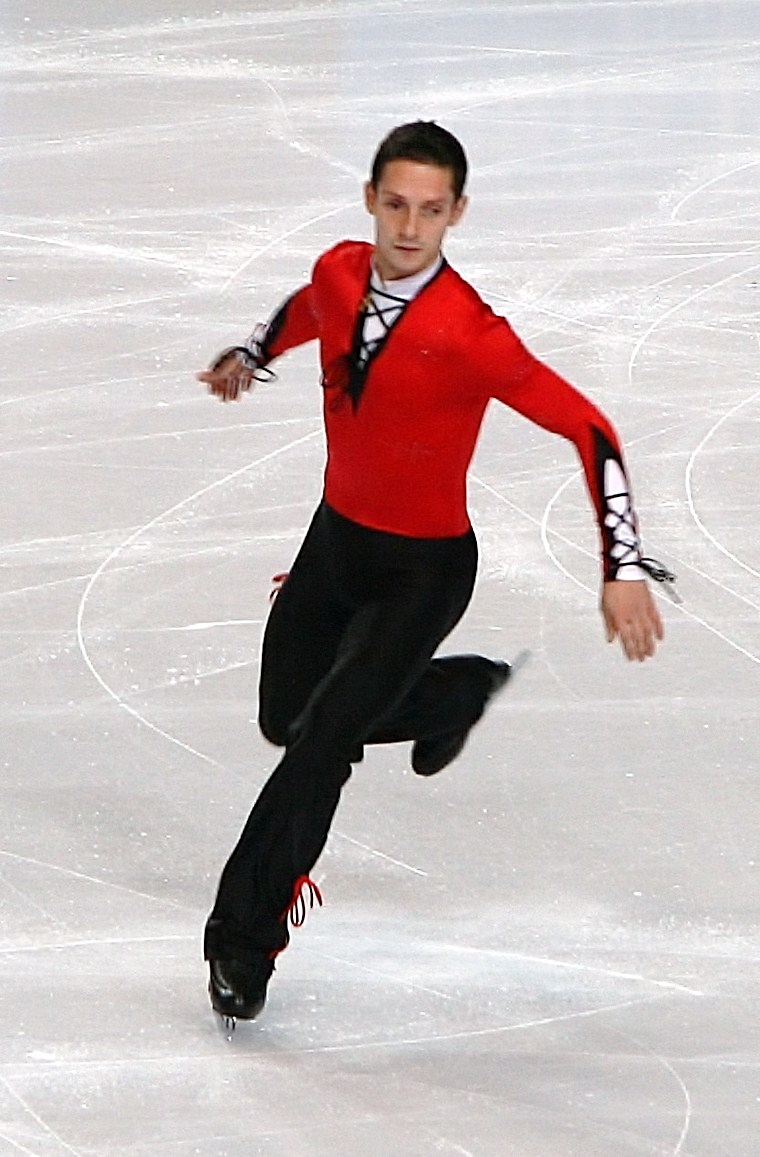
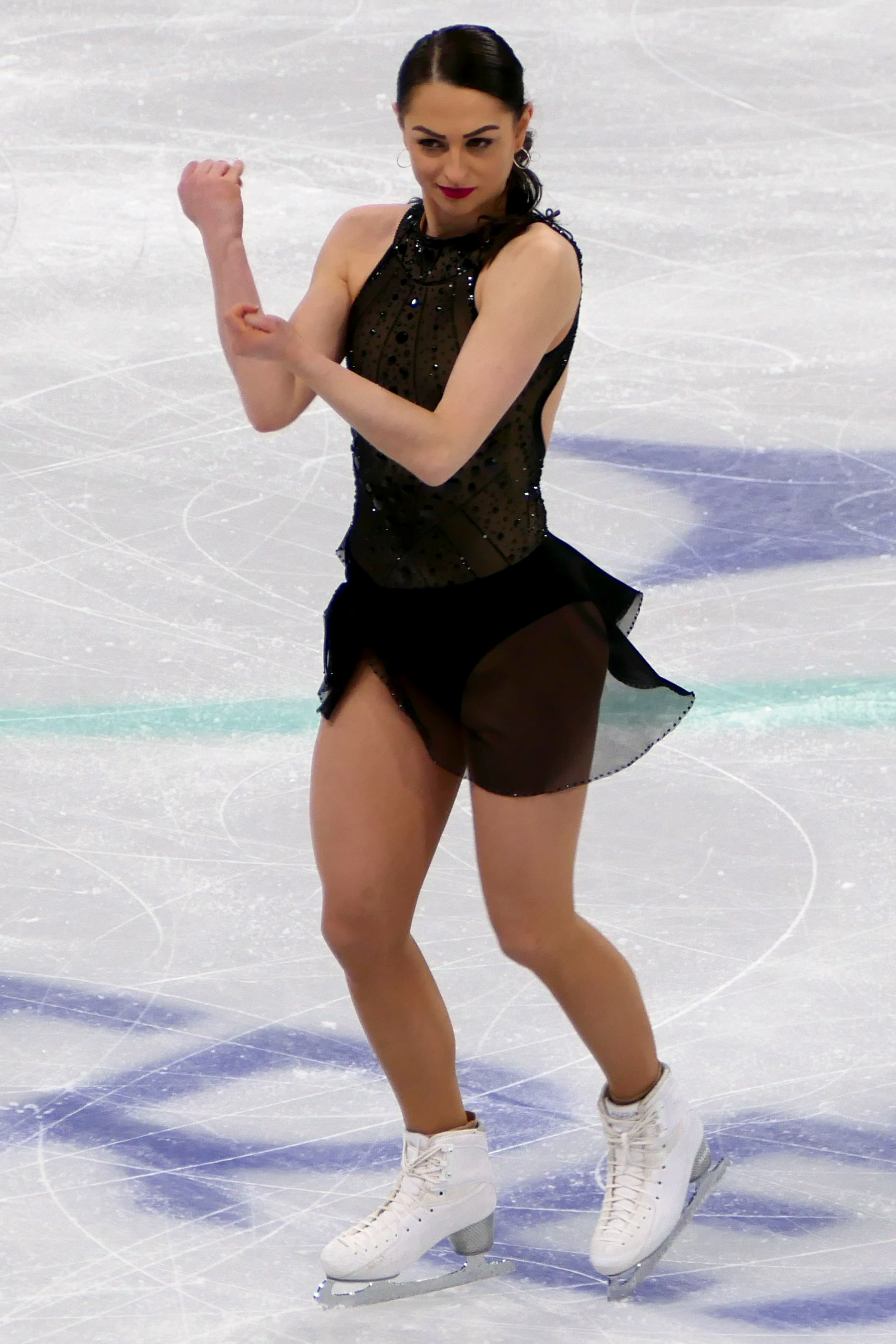
From left to right: Zoltán Kelemen, eight-time Romanian champion in men's singles; and Julia Sauter, ten-time Romanian champion in women's singles

=== Men's singles ===
Senior men's event medalists
Year	Location	Gold	Silver	Bronze	Ref.
1924	Bucharest	Elemer Hirsch	C. Lupu	D. Navrea	
1925	Cluj-Napoca	Elemer Hirsch	Aurel Puşcaşiu	Lajos Beke	
1926	Chernivtsi (Note: Chernivtsi, in present-day Ukraine, was at this point in time called Cernăuți and was part of the Kingdom of Romania.)	Elemer Hirsch	dnul. Linul	Lajos Beke	
1927	Cluj-Napoca	Elemer Hirsch	Aurel Puşcaşiu	Lajos Beke	
1928	Brașov	dnul. Luno	Lajos Beke	Aurel Puşcaşiu	
1929	Cluj-Napoca	Lajos Beke	Aurel Puşcaşiu	Béla Horosz	
1930	Cluj-Napoca	Béla Horosz	Lajos Beke	No other competitors	
1931	Brașov	Béla Horosz	Lajos Beke	Aurel Puşcaşiu	
1932	Cluj-Napoca	Lajos Beke	Béla Horosz	Kár Habermann	
1933	Bucharest	Béla Horosz	Dorin Stanciulescu	Maxim Bindea	
1934	Bucharest	Béla Horosz	Maxim Bindea	Kár Habermann	
1935	Chernivtsi	Béla Horosz	Roman Turuşanco	Dorin Stanciulescu	
1936	No competition held				
1937	Brașov	Maxim Bindea	Roman Turuşanco	H. Fischer	
1938	Red Lake	Maxim Bindea	Roman Turuşanco	Ştefan Balaş	
1939	Red Lake (Note: The 1939 Romanian Championships, originally scheduled in Bucharest, were not held due to unfavorable ice conditions. An unofficial competition was held later at the Red Lake, attended by most of Romania's top skaters.)	Ştefan Balaş	dnul. Hankó	dnul. Szende	
1940	Cluj-Napoca	Roman Turuşanco	dnul. Jeney	No other competitors	
1941–45	No competitions held due to World War II				
1946	Cluj-Napoca	Roman Turuşanco	Maxim Bindea	Ştefan Balaş	
1947–48	No competitions held due to World War II				
1949	Cluj-Napoca	Roman Turuşanco	Maxim Bindea	Ştefan Balaş	
1950	Cluj-Napoca	Maxim Bindea	Valeriu Bonţidiie	No other competitors	
1951	No competition held				
1952	Miercurea Ciuc	Maxim Bindea	Roman Turuşanco	No other competitors	
1953	Cluj-Napoca	Roman Turuşanco	Maxim Bindea	Mircea Sadoveanu	
1954	Brașov	Roman Turuşanco	Maxim Bindea	Ştefan Balaş	
1955	Brașov	Roman Turuşanco	Ştefan Balaş	Teo Cristian	
1956	Cluj-Napoca	Roman Turuşanco	Maxim Bindea	Teo Cristian	
1957	Miercurea Ciuc	Maxim Bindea	Ştefan Balaş	Teo Cristian	
1958	Bucharest	Roman Turuşanco	Maxim Bindea	Ştefan Hudak	
1959	Cluj-Napoca	Roman Turuşanco	Maxim Bindea	Radu Ionian	
1960	Bucharest	Radu Ionian	Petru Gall	Carol Hertl	
1961	Bucharest	Radu Ionian	V. Neagu	Petru Gall	
1962	Bucharest	Radu Ionian	V. Neagu	L. Nanaşi	
1963	Bucharest	Radu Ionian	Carol Hertl	Marcel Comanici	
1964	Bucharest	Radu Ionian	Marcel Comanici	Carol Hertl	
1965	Bucharest	Marcel Comanici	Nicolae Bellu	Carol Hertl	
1966	Bucharest	Marcel Comanici	Nicolae Bellu	Mihai Stoenescu	
1967	Bucharest	Mihai Stoenescu	Marcel Comanici	Nicolae Bellu	
1968	Bucharest	Marcel Comanici	Nicolae Bellu	Mihai Stoenescu	
1969	Bucharest	Gheorghe Fazekas	Marcel Comanici	Dragos Sandu	
1970	Bucharest	Gheorghe Fazekas	Marcel Comanici	Dragos Sandu	
1971	Bucharest	Gheorghe Fazekas	Mircea Ion	Octavian Goga	
1972	Miercurea Ciuc	Gheorghe Fazekas	Mircea Ion	Atanase Bulete	
1973	Bucharest	Gheorghe Fazekas	Atanase Bulete	Mircea Ion	
1974	Miercurea Ciuc	Men's competition cancelled due to inclement weather			
1975	Bucharest	Mircea Ion	Atanase Bulete	A. Georgescu	
1976	Miercurea Ciuc	Mircea Ion	Atanase Bulete	A. Georgescu	
1977	Miercurea Ciuc	Leonard Azzola	Adrian Vasile	Atanase Bulete	
1978	Miercurea Ciuc	Leonard Azzola	Mircea Ion	Adrian Vasile	
1979	Galați	Bogdan Krutii	Mircea Ion	Adrian Vasile	
1980	Bucharest	Adrian Vasile	Liviu Ghica	A. Anghel	
1981	Bucharest	Bogdan Krutii	Adrian Vasile	Liviu Ghica	
1982	Galați	Adrian Vasile	Bogdan Krutii	Liviu Ghica	
1983	Galați	Adrian Vasile	Bogdan Krutii	Marius Negrea	
1984	Galați	Adrian Vasile	Bogdan Krutii	Marius Negrea	
1985	Miercurea Ciuc	Adrian Vasile	Marius Negrea	Bogdan Krutii	
1986	Bucharest	Adrian Vasile	Bogdan Krutii	Cornel Gheorghe	
1987	Miercurea Ciuc	Cornel Gheorghe	Marian Prisăcaru	Kovács György	
1988	Gheorgheni	Cornel Gheorghe	Marius Negrea	Marian Prisăcaru	
1989	Galați	Cornel Gheorghe	Zsolt Kerekes	Marius Negrea	
1990	Bucharest	Cornel Gheorghe	Marius Negrea	Luiz Taifas	
1991	Bucharest	Cornel Gheorghe	Marius Negrea	Zsolt Kerekes	
1992	Bucharest	Marius Negrea	Cornel Gheorghe	Luiz Taifas	
1993	Bucharest	Cornel Gheorghe	Zsolt Kerekes	Marius Negrea	
1994	Miercurea Ciuc	Cornel Gheorghe	Marius Negrea	Bálint Miklós	
1995	Bucharest	Cornel Gheorghe	Luiz Taifas	Gheorghe Chiper	
1996	Bucharest	Cornel Gheorghe	Luiz Taifas	Marius Negrea	
1997	Miercurea Ciuc	Cornel Gheorghe	Marius Negrea	Gheorghe Chiper	
1998	Bucharest	Cornel Gheorghe	Gheorghe Chiper	Luiz Taifas	
1999	Bucharest	Gheorghe Chiper	Cornel Gheorghe	Bálint Miklós	
2000	Bucharest	Gheorghe Chiper	Cornel Gheorghe	Adrian Matei	
2001	Bucharest	Gheorghe Chiper	Bálint Miklós	Adrian Matei	
2002	Bucharest	Gheorghe Chiper	Carol Braileanu	Adrian Matei	
2003	Bucharest	Gheorghe Chiper	Zoltán Kelemen	No other competitors	
2004	Miercurea Ciuc	Adrian Matei	Zoltán Kelemen	No other competitors	
2005	Bucharest	Gheorghe Chiper	Zoltán Kelemen	Adrian Matei	
2006	Bucharest	Gheorghe Chiper	Adrian Matei	Zoltán Kelemen	
2007	Bucharest	Zoltán Kelemen	Adrian Matei	Zsolt Kósz	
2008	Bucharest	Zoltán Kelemen	Zsolt Kósz	Vlad Ionescu	
2009	Bucharest	Zoltán Kelemen	Zsolt Kósz	No other competitors	
2010	Brașov	Zoltán Kelemen	Vlad Ionescu	Zsolt Kósz	
2011	Brașov	Zoltán Kelemen	Vlad Ionescu	Zsolt Kósz	
2012	Brașov	Zoltán Kelemen	Vlad Ionescu	Zsolt Kósz	
2013	Brașov	Zoltán Kelemen	No other competitors		
2014	Brașov	Zoltán Kelemen	No other competitors		
2015	Brașov	No men's competitors			
2016	Brașov	Dorjan Kecskes	No other competitors		
2017	Miercurea Ciuc	Dorjan Kecskes	No other competitors		
2018	Bucharest	Dorjan Kecskes	No other competitors		
2019	Bucharest	Andrei Tanase	Dorjan Kecskes	No other competitors	
2020	Otopeni	Dorjan Kecskes	No other competitors		
2021	Miercurea Ciuc	Dorjan Kecskes	No other competitors		
2022	Miercurea Ciuc	Dorjan Kecskes (Note: Dorjan Kecskes did not achieve the minimum required score to be named the Romanian champion.)	No other competitors		
2023	Otopeni	Christian Nainer	Andrei Tudor-Dominic	Anelin-George Enache	
2024–26	No men's competitors				
2027	Brașov	Luc Economides	No other competitors		

=== Women's singles ===
Senior women's event medalists
Year	Location	Gold	Silver	Bronze	Ref.
1925	Cluj-Napoca	Anna Bojáky	No other competitors		
1926	Chernivtsi	Anna Bojáky	No other competitors		
1927	Cluj-Napoca	No women's competitors			
1928	Brașov	Romulus Pop	dna. Domokos	No other competitors	
1929	Cluj-Napoca	Magda Kiss	dna. Linul	Gizi Schuller	
1930	Cluj-Napoca	Romulus Pop	Magda Kiss	Klári Csorba	
1931	Brașov	Romulus Pop	Magda Kiss	Klári Csorba	
1932	Cluj-Napoca	Klári Csorba	Romulus Pop	Magda Kiss	
1933	Bucharest	Tuti Csorba	Romulus Pop	Magda Kiss	
1934	Cluj-Napoca	Tuti Csorba	Gerda Rodewald	Gonder Paller & Greta Rodenwald (tied)	
1935	Chernivtsi	Gerda Rodewald	Trude Guber	dna. Hodlerné	
1936	No competition held				
1937	Brașov	Trude Guber	Rominca Pop	Erzsébet Winkler	
1938	Red Lake	Rominca Pop	dna. Papp	Trude Guber	
1939	Red Lake	Rominca Pop	Trude Guber	Nora Walter	
1940	Cluj-Napoca	Rominca Pop	Trude Guber	Borisca Kovacs	
1941–45	No competitions held due to World War II				
1946	Cluj-Napoca	Borbana Covaci	dna. Katalin	No other competitors	
1947–48	No competitions held due to World War II				
1949	Cluj-Napoca	Ecaterina Wellman	Rudi Connerth	Marieta Weinrich	
1950	Cluj-Napoca	Ecaterina Wellman	Marieta Weinrich	Cecilia Weinrich	
1951	No competition held				
1952	Miercurea Ciuc	Ecaterina Puzstay	Marieta Weinrich	Trude Konnerth	
1953	Cluj-Napoca	Ecaterina Puzstay	Marieta Weinrich	Cecilia Weinrich	
1954	Brașov	Ecaterina Puzstay	Marieta Weinrich	Cecilia Weinrich	
1955	Brașov	Marieta Weinrich	Ecaterina Puzstay	Cecilia Weinrich	
1956	Cluj-Napoca	Marieta Weinrich	Ecaterina Puzstay	Cecilia Weinrich	
1957	Miercurea Ciuc	Marieta Weinrich	Cecilia Weinrich	Eva Pálossy	
1958	Bucharest	Marieta Weinrich	Cecilia Weinrich	Eva Pálossy	
1959	Cluj-Napoca	Marieta Weinrich	Cristina Patraulea	Imola Seiwarth	
1960	Bucharest	Cristina Patraulea	Imola Seiwarth	Cecilia Weinrich	
1961	Bucharest	Cristina Patraulea	Imola Seiwarth	Eva Seiwarth	
1962	Bucharest	Cristina Patraulea	Irina Zaharescu	Roxana Găbunea	
1963	Bucharest	Elena Moiş	Cristina Patraulea	Imola Seiwarth	
1964	Bucharest	Elena Moiş	Crenguţa Cumbari	Imola Seiwarth	
1965	Bucharest	Elena Moiş	Cristina Formagiu	No other competitors	
1966	Bucharest	Elena Moiş	Cristina Formagiu	No other competitors	
1967	Bucharest	Elena Moiş	Beatrice Huştiu	Rodica Dîdă	
1968	Bucharest	Elena Moiş	Beatrice Huştiu	Doina Ghiserel	
1969	Bucharest	Beatrice Huştiu	Rodica Dîdă	Constanţa Ionescu	
1970	Bucharest	Beatrice Huştiu	Elena Moiş	Rodica Dîdă	
1971	Bucharest	Elena Moiş	Doina Mitricică	Rodica Dîdă	
1972	Miercurea Ciuc	Doina Mitricică	Elena Moiş	Mariana Ionel	
1973	Bucharest	Doina Mitricică	Gabriela Voica	Silvana Suciu	
1974	Miercurea Ciuc	Elena Moiş	Doina Mitricică	Silvana Suciu	
1975	Bucharest	Doina Mitricică	Silvana Suciu	Beatrice Huştiu	
1976	Miercurea Ciuc	Doina Mitricică	Beatrice Huştiu	Gabriela Voica	
1977	Miercurea Ciuc	Gabriela Voica	Cornelia Picu	Mariana Chiţu	
1978	Miercurea Ciuc	Cornelia Picu	Gabriela Voica	Tereza Nencu	
1979	Galați	Irina Nichiforov	Gabriela Voica	Cornelia Picu	
1980	Bucharest	Gabriela Voica	Tereza Nencu	Dana Rădulsecu	
1981	Bucharest	Mariana Chiţu	Gabriela Voica	Manuela Bădiţoiu	
1982	Galați	Mariana Chiţu	Viorica Nicu	Irina Nichiforov	
1983	Galați	Viorica Nicu	Irina Nichiforov	Brigite Sigmund	
1984	Galați	Mariana Chiţu	Manuela Bădiţoiu	Simona D'Albon	
1985	Miercurea Ciuc	Kinga Szállasi	Csilla Sándor	Maria Grusz	
1986	Bucharest	Greti Márton	Anca Cristescu	Nicoleta Cimpoieşu	
1987	Miercurea Ciuc	Greti Márton	Nicoleta Cimpoieşu	Eva Gegő	
1988	Gheorgheni	Greti Márton	Beatrisz Kurcsakovski	Marina Bellu	
1989	Galați	Codruţa Moiseanu	Fabiola Vişinoiu	Beatrisz Kurcsakovski	
1990	Bucharest	Codruţa Moiseanu	Beatrice Kurcsacovszki	Andrea Munteanu	
1991	Bucharest	Codruţa Moiseanu	Beatrice Kurcsacovszki	Raluca Duda	
1992	Bucharest	Codruţa Moiseanu	Beatrice Kurcsacovszki	Noémi Bedö	
1993	Bucharest	Beatrisz Kurcsakovski	Codruţa Moiseanu	Oana Danciu	
1994	Miercurea Ciuc	Ramona Cruceru	Oana Danciu	Kinga Székely	
1995	Bucharest	Oana Veliscu	Mădălina Matei	Noémi Bedö	
1996	Bucharest	Roxana Luca	Noémi Bedö	Oana Veliscu	
1997	Miercurea Ciuc	Noémi Bedö	Roxana Luca	Oana Veliscu	
1998	Bucharest	Noémi Bedö	Mădălina Matei	Roxana Luca	
1999	Bucharest	Roxana Luca	Noémi Bedö	Mădălina Matei	
2000	Bucharest	Roxana Luca	Noémi Bedö	Simona Pungă	
2001	Bucharest	Roxana Luca	Simona Pungă	Diana Dragomir	
2002	Bucharest	Roxana Luca	Simona Pungă	Roxana Boamfă	
2003	Bucharest	Roxana Boamfă	Maria Balea	Simona Pungă	
2004	Miercurea Ciuc	Simona Pungă	Roxana Boamfă	Tünde Gáll	
2005	Bucharest	Roxana Luca	Roxana Simionescu	Maria Balea	
2006	Bucharest	Roxana Luca	Tünde Gáll	Roxana Boamfă	
2007	Bucharest	Roxana Luca	Lisa Larissa Ipati	Maria Balea	
2008	Bucharest	Roxana Luca	Tünde Gáll	Maria Balea	
2009	Galați	Roxana Luca	Anita Nagy	Maria Balea	
2010	Galați	Sabina Paquier	Sabina Măriuță	Maria Balea	
2011	Brașov	Sabina Măriuță	Anca Ionescu	Anita Nagy	
2012	Brașov	Denisa Sandu	Raisa Rijenovski	No other competitors	
2013	Brașov	Sabina Măriuță	Raisa Rijenovski	No other competitors	
2014	Brașov	Julia Sauter	No other competitors		
2015	Brașov	Julia Sauter	No other competitors		
2016	Brașov	Zselyke Kenéz	No other competitors		
2017	Miercurea Ciuc	Julia Sauter	No other competitors		
2018	Otopeni	Zselyke Kenéz	Irina Preda	No other competitors	
2019	Otopeni	Julia Sauter	Amanda Stan	Cristiana Mihaela Silca	
2020	Otopeni	Ana Sofia Beșchea	Andreea Ureche	Cristia Calcan	
2021	Miercurea Ciuc	Ana Sofia Beșchea	Ana-Maria Ion	No other competitors	
2022	Miercurea Ciuc	Julia Sauter	Ana Sofia Beșchea	Ana-Maria Ion	
2023	Otopeni	Julia Sauter	Andreea Ramona Voicu	Andreea Denisa Comanescu	
2024	Otopeni	Julia Sauter	Ana Sofia Beșchea	Andreea Ramona Voicu	
2025	Otopeni	Julia Sauter	Ana Sofia Beșchea	Teodora Maria Gheorghe	
2026	(Hungary) Székesfehérvár	Julia Sauter	Ana Sofia Beșchea	Teodora Maria Gheorghe	
2027	Brașov	Julia Sauter	Ana Stratulat	Ana Sofia Beșchea	

=== Pairs ===
Senior pairs event medalists
Year	Location	Gold	Silver	Bronze	Ref.
1924	Bucharest	dna. Vincent; dnul. Vincent	dna. Lehmann; dnul. D. Navrea	No other competitors	
1925–26	No pairs competitors				
1927	Cluj-Napoca	Anna Bojáky; Lajos Beke	Roza Biluska; Heidel Gheorghe	No other competitors	
1928	Brașov	Anna Bojáky; Lajos Beke	Dşoara Bohăţiel; dnul. Bélchei	Roza Biluska; Heidel Gheorghe	
1929	Cluj-Napoca	No pairs competitors			
1930	Cluj-Napoca	Anna Bojáky; Lajos Beke	No other competitors		
1931	Brașov	Anna Bojáky; Lajos Beke	dna. Moser; Kár Habermann	dna. Onciu; dnul. G. Rodewald	
1932	Cluj-Napoca	Anna Bojáky; Lajos Beke	dna. Jakabffy; László Eltzenbaum	dna. Moser; Kár Habermann	
1933	Bucharest	Irina Timcic; Alfred Eisenbeisser	Anna Bojáky; Lajos Beke	dna. Jakabffy; László Eltzenbaum	
1934	Cluj-Napoca	Anna Manosek; Lajos Beke	Irina Timcic; Alfred Eisenbeisser	Trude Guber; Berthold Henchert	
1935	Chernivtsi	Irina Timcic; Alfred Eisenbeisser	Trude Guber; Berthold Henchert	dna. Turchner; dnul. Zajavszkovszky	
1936	No competition held				
1937	Brașov	Irina Timcic; Alfred Eisenbeisser	Trude Guber; Berthold Henchert	No other competitors	
1938	Red Lake	Irina Timcic; Alfred Eisenbeisser	Ileana Moldoveanu; Berthold Henchert	dna. Zapparden; Béla Horosz	
1939	Red Lake	Trude Guber; Berthold Henchert	Ana Radeş; dnul. Madarassy	dna. Zajenic; dnul. Zajenic	
1940	Cluj-Napoca	Trude Guber; Berthold Henchert	Ana Radeş; dnul. Madarassy	No other competitors	
1941–45	No competitions held due to World War II				
1946	Cluj-Napoca	Ana Radeş; Béla Horosz	Ana Manosek; Lajos Beke	No other competitors	
1947–48	No competitions held due to World War II				
1949	Cluj-Napoca	Trude Konnerth; Berthold Henchert	Ecaterina Wellman; Lajos Beke	dna. Musca; L. Bonţideanu	
1950	Cluj-Napoca	Irina Museă; Valeriu Bonţidie	No other competitors		
1951	No competition held				
1952	Miercurea Ciuc	Trude Konnerth; Berthold Henchert	No other competitors		
1953	Cluj-Napoca	No pairs competitors			
1954	Brașov	Irina Minculescu; Alfred Eisenbeisser	Trude Konnerth; Berthold Henchert	Ecaterina Pusztay; Ştefan Balaş	
1955	Brașov	Irina Minculescu; Alfred Eisenbeisser	Trude Konnerth; Berthold Henchert	Ecaterina Pusztay; Ştefan Balaş	
1956	Cluj-Napoca	Irina Minculescu; Alfred Eisenbeisser	Trude Konnerth; Berthold Henchert	Ecaterina Pusztay; Ştefan Balaş	
1957	Miercurea Ciuc	Trude Konnerth; Berthold Henchert	Ana Radeş; F. Maderaş	Ecaterina Pusztay; Ştefan Balaş	
1958	Bucharest	Ecaterina Pusztay; Ştefan Balaş	Vera Curceac; Alfred Eisenbeiser	Ana Radeş; F. Maderaş	
1959	Cluj-Napoca	Ecaterina Pusztay; Ştefan Balaş	Vera Curceac; Alfred Fieraru	Dorina Coman; Ştefan Bugnariu	
1960	Bucharest	No pairs competitors			
1961	Bucharest	Cristina Patraulea; Radu Ionian	No other competitors		
1962	Bucharest	Cristina Patraulea; Radu Ionian	No other competitors		
1963	Bucharest	Cristina Patraulea; Radu Ionian	No other competitors		
1964	Bucharest	Cristina Patraulea; Radu Ionian	Eva Miculici; Radu Ionescu	No other competitors	
1965	Bucharest	Letiţia Păcuraru; Radu Ionian	No other competitors		
1966	Bucharest	Letiţia Păcuraru; Radu Ionian	Liliana Georgescu; Dan Săveanu	No other competitors	
1967	Bucharest	Liliana Georgescu; Radu Ionian	Daniela Popesci; Marian Chiosea	No other competitors	
1968	Bucharest	Daniela Popesci; Marian Chiosea	Marinela Ciubecă; Carol Hertl	No other competitors	
1969	Bucharest	Letiţia Păcuraru; Dan Săveanu	Daniela Popesci; Marian Chiosea	Marinela Ciubecă; Carol Hertl	
1970	Bucharest	Letiţia Păcuraru; Dan Săveanu	Daniela Popesci; Marian Chiosea	No other competitors	
1971	Bucharest	Liliana Georgescu; Dan Săveanu	Daniela Popesci; Marian Chiosea	No other competitors	
1972	Miercurea Ciuc	Letiţia Păcuraru; Dan Săveanu	No other competitors		
1973	Bucharest	Beatrice Hustiu; Dan Săveanu	No other competitors		
1974	Miercurea Ciuc	Beatrice Hustiu; Dan Săveanu	No other competitors		
1975–88	No pairs competitors				
1989	Galați	Iovanca Cnejev; Felix Sinitean	Cosima Ciuhandu; Cătălin Frățilă	Manuela Dolga; Ionuţ Dolga	
1990	Bucharest	Corina Vastag; Felix Sinitean	Sinziana Mihalache; Louis Taifas	Cosima Ciuhandu; Cătălin Frățilă	
1991	Bucharest	Corina Vastag; Felix Sinitean	Cosima Ciuhandu; Cătălin Frățilă	Cristina Fekete; Gheorghe Chiper	
1992	Bucharest	Cosima Ciuhandu; Cătălin Frățilă	Cristina Fekete; Gheorghe Chiper	Manuela Dolga; Ionuţ Dolga	
1993	Bucharest	Cosima Ciuhandu; Cătălin Frățilă	Cristina Fekete; Gheorghe Chiper	No other competitors	
No pairs competitions since 1993

== Junior medalists ==
While junior-level championships were held in Romania prior to 2011, this is earliest for which full results have been documented.

=== Men's singles ===
Junior men's event medalists
Year	Location	Gold	Silver	Bronze	Ref.
2011	Brașov	Vlad Ionescu	Zsolt Kósz	Iancu Vergheleţ	
2012	Brașov	Vlad Ionescu	Zsolt Kósz	Iancu Vergheleţ	
2013	Bucharest	Catalin Dimitrescu	Daniel Patriche	Graţiano Dinu	
2014	Brașov	Valentin Costache	Graţiano Dinu	Iancu Vergheleţ	
2015	Brașov	Flavius Luca	Valentin Costache	Dorjan Kecskes	
2016	Brașov	Valentin Costache	Andrei Tanase	Dorjan Kecskes	
2017	Brașov	Andrei Tanase	No other competitors		
2018	Târgu Secuiesc	Andrei Tanase	No other competitors		
2019	Otopeni	Andrei Tanase	Sebastian Radovan	No other competitors	
2020	Otopeni	Andrei Tanase	No other competitors		
2021	Miercurea Ciuc	Lehel Tulit	No other competitors		
2022	Miercurea Ciuc	Anelin-George Enache (Note: Neither Anelin-George Enache nor Lehel Tulit achieved the required minimum score to be named the Romanian junior champion.)	Lehel Tulit	No other competitors	
2023	Otopeni	Andrei Tudor-Dominic	No other competitors		
2024	Otopeni	Răzvan Cionac	Anelin-George Enache	No other competitors	
2025	Otopeni	Răzvan Cionac	Bálint Domahidi-Dóczy	No other competitors	
2026	Otopeni	Răzvan Cionac	No other competitors		

=== Women's singles ===
Junior women's event medalists
Year	Location	Gold	Silver	Bronze	Ref.
2011	Brașov	Denisa Sandu	Sabina Măriuță	Raisa Rijenovski	
2012	Brașov	Marya Fay Vangeystelen	Raisa Rijenovski	Anita Nagy	
2013	Bucharest	Julia Sauter	Marya Fay Vangestelen	Denisa Sandu	
2014	Brașov	Zselyke Kenéz	Ana Catană	Raisa Rjenovschi	
2015	Brașov	Julia Sauter	Amanda Stan	Zselyke Kenéz	
2016	Brașov	Julia Sauter	Amanda Stan	Zselyke Kenéz	
2017	Brașov	Amanda Stan	Zselyke Kenéz	Cristiana Mihaela Silca	
2018	Târgu Secuiesc	Amanda Stan	Ana Sofia Beșchea	Bristena Prodea	
2019	Otopeni	Bristena Prodea	Ramona-Andreaa Voicu	Ana Sofia Beșchea	
2020	Otopeni	Ana Sofia Beșchea	Ramona-Andreaa Voicu	Luiza Elena Ilie	
2021	Miercurea Ciuc	Ramona-Andreaa Voicu	Ana Sofia Beșchea	Ingrid Ana Pricop	
2022	Miercurea Ciuc	Ana Sofia Beșchea	Luiza-Elena Ilie	Ruxandra Rotundu	
2023	Otopeni	Luiza-Elena Ilie	Ruxandra Rotundu	Ingrid Pricop	
2024	Otopeni	Natalia Runcanu	Maria Smaranda	Tara-Maria Ienciu	
2025	Otopeni	Natalia Runcanu	Ana Stratulat	Adria Liliac	
2026	Otopeni	Adria Liliac	Andreea Cristiana Maria Lazar	Ana Stratulat	

== Records ==
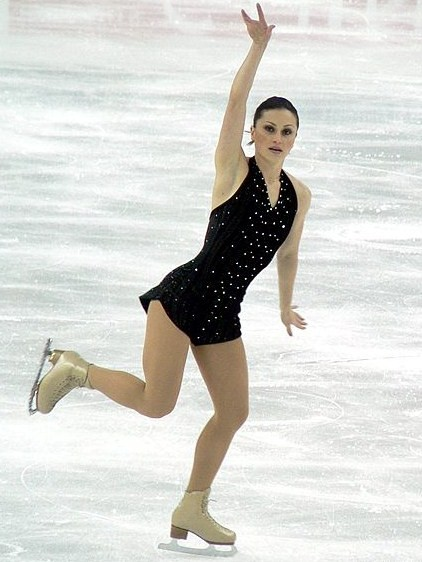
Roxana Luca won ten Romanian Championship titles in women's singles.

Records
Discipline	Most championship titles			
Discipline	Skater(s)	No.	Years	Ref.
Men's singles	Cornel Gheorghe	11	1987–91; 1993–98	
Women's singles	Roxana Luca	10	1996; 1999–2002; 2005–09	
Women's singles	Julia Sauter	10	2014–15; 2017; 2019; 2022–27	
Pairs	Irina Timcic; Alfred Eisenbeisser	7	1933; 1935; 1937–38; 1954–56	
