= Zoltán Kelemen =

Zoltán Kelemen may refer to:

- Zoltán Kelemen (baritone) (1926–1979), Hungarian bass-baritone
- Zoltán Kelemen (figure skater) (born 1986), Romanian figure skater
- Zoltán Kelemen (gymnast) (born 1958), Hungarian artistic gymnast
