= Sarina Joos =

Swiss-Italian figure skater (born 2006)

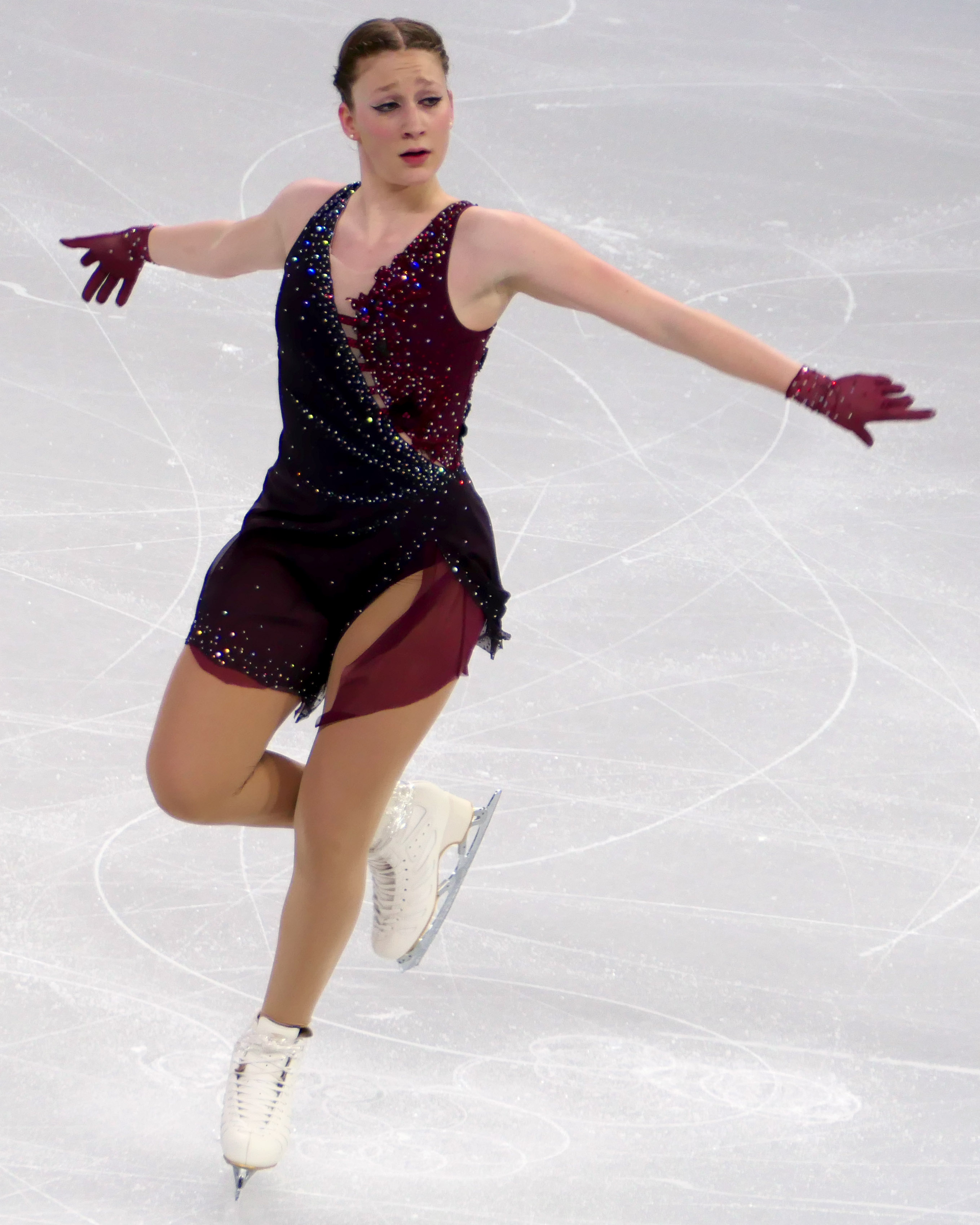
- Sarina Joos during her short program at the 2024 World Championships

Personal information
- Born: 24 June 2006 (age 20) Zürich, Switzerland
- Height: 1.66 m (5 ft 5 1/2 in)

Figure skating career
- Country: Italy (since 2023); Switzerland (until 2023)
- Discipline: Women's singles
- Coach: Kelsey McNeil; Zoltán Kelemen; Gheorghe Chiper; Viveca Lindfors
- Began skating: 2015

Medal record
Representing Italy
Italian Championships
Gold medal – first place	2024 Pinerolo	Singles
Silver medal – second place	2026 Begamo	Singles
Representing Switzerland
Swiss Championships
Bronze medal – third place	2023 Chur	Singles

Sarina Joos (born 24 June 2006) is a Swiss-Italian figure skater who now represents Italy. Representing Italy, she is the 2024 Italian national champion and the 2025 CS Nepela Memorial bronze medalist.

Representing Switzerland, she is the 2022 CS Warsaw Cup silver medalist and 2023 Swiss national bronze medalist. On the junior level, Joos is the 2022 European Youth Olympic bronze medalist and a two-time Swiss junior national medalist (silver in 2022, bronze in 2020).

== Personal life ==
Joos was born on 24 June 2006 in Zürich, Switzerland to an Italian mother and Swiss father. Her younger sister, Noemi, is also a competitive figure skater.

== Career ==
=== Early career ===
Joos began learning how to skate in 2015. Her early coaches included Gheorghe Chiper, Zoltán Kelemen, and Kelsey McNeil.

She made her national debut at the 2019–20 Swiss Junior Championships, Joos won the bronze medal.

=== Skating for Switzerland ===
==== 2021–22 season: Junior international debut ====
Making her first appearance on the Junior Grand Prix series, Joos placed eleventh at the 2021 JGP Poland. She then went on to win the silver medal at both the 2021 Tirnavia Ice Cup and the 2021 Merano Cup.

At the 2021–22 Swiss Junior Championships, Joos won the silver medal behind Kimmy Repond. She ended the season by winning a bronze at the 2022 European Youth Olympic Festival in Vuokatti, Finland.

==== 2022–23 season: Senior international debut ====
Competing in the 2022–23 ISU Junior Grand Prix series, Joos placed seventh at the 2022 JGP Czech Republic and twelfth at the 2022 JGP Poland II. She made her senior international debut in September at the 2022 CS Lombardia Trophy, where she finished seventh. Joos went on to win the silver medal on the junior level at the 2022 Ice Challenge as well as her first medal on the senior level – silver at the 2022 CS Warsaw Cup.

Joos ended the season with a bronze medal on the senior level at the 2022–23 Swiss Championships behind Livia Kaiser and Kimmy Repond.

=== Skating for Italy ===
==== 2023–24 season: Italian national champion ====
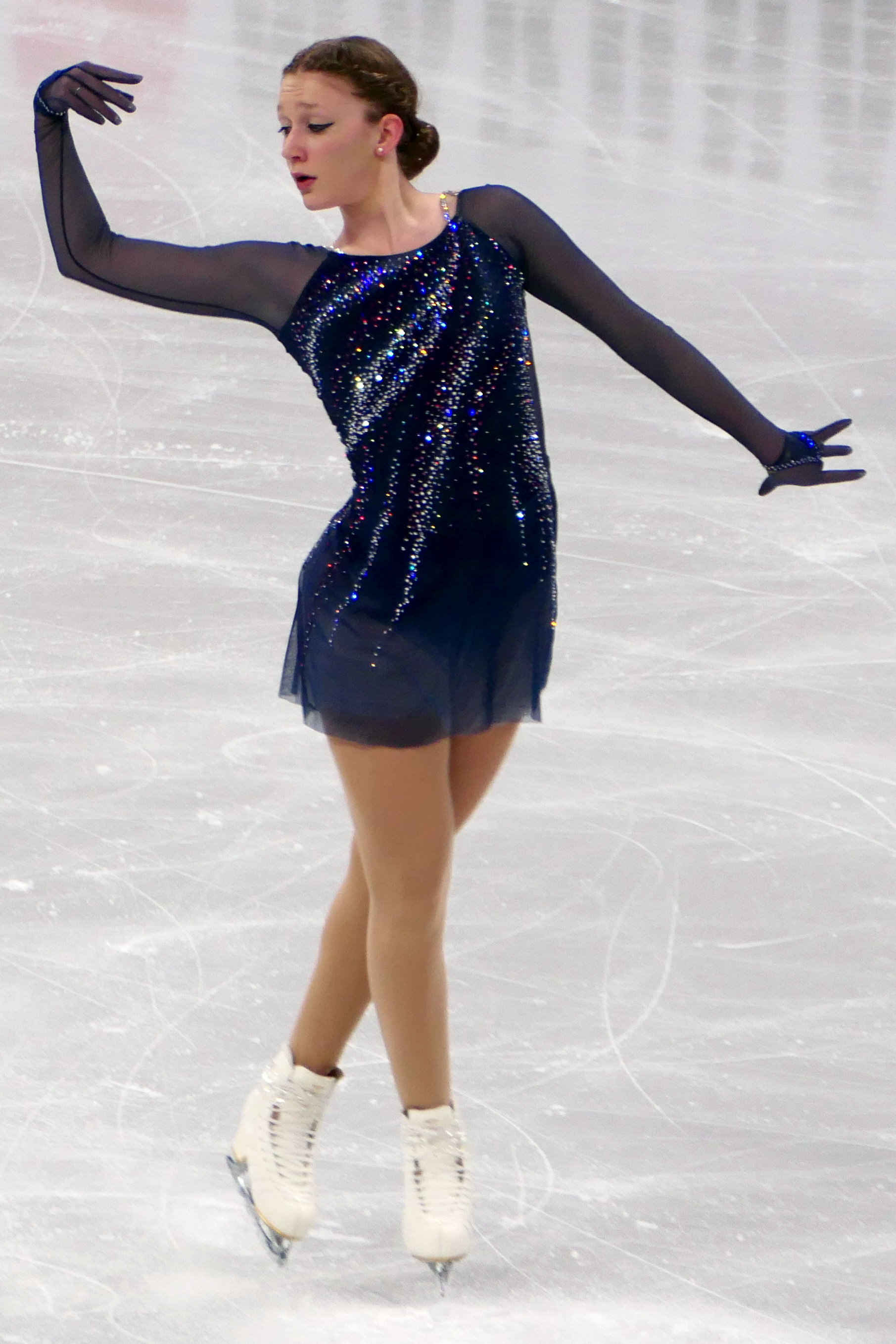
Joos during the free skate at the 2024 World Championships

This season, Joos and her younger sister, Noemi, decided to start representing their mother's native Italy. It was subsequently announced that Joos had made a coaching change and was now training under Linda van Troyen, Sindra Kriisa, and Lorenzo Magri.

She made her international debut for Italy at the 2023 Tallinn Trophy in November, winning gold, before going on to win gold at the 2023 CS Golden Spin of Zagreb. In her first appearance at the Italian Championships she claimed the national title.

Assigned to make her European Championship debut at the 2024 edition in Kaunas, Joos came sixth, including a fifth-place finish in the free skate segment. She said she was "so incredibly happy. I am glad I could show what I do in practices."

Joos finished fourteenth in the short program at the 2024 World Junior Championships, but rallied in the free skate, coming fifth in the segment and rising to seventh overall. She said it was "great to be here with such a big Italian team." She went on to make her senior World Championship debut, coming twentieth.

==== 2024–25 season ====
Joos began the season by competing on the Junior Grand Prix circuit. She finished tenth at 2024 JGP Latvia and at 2024 JGP Czech Republic. Going on to compete on the senior international level, Joos finished fifth at the 2024 CS Nepela Memorial and fourth at the 2024 Tirnavia Ice Cup.

In early November, it was announced that Joos had returned to her former coaching team of Gheorghe Chiper, Zoltán Kelemen, and Kelsey McNeil.

She subsequently withdrew from the 2025 Italian Championships in mid-December.

==== 2025–26 season ====
Returning to competition in August, Joos opened the season by winning gold at the 2025 Robin Cousins Cup. She then went on to win bronze at the 2025 CS Nepela Memorial, gold at the 2025 Diamond Spin, as well as place fourth at the 2025 CS Warsaw Cup.

In December, Joos won the silver medal at the 2026 Italian Championships behind Lara Naki Gutmann. The following month, she competed at the 2026 European Championships in Sheffield, England, United Kingdom, where she finished sixth overall, earning a new personal best free skate and combined total score in the process. "I'm super happy and super emotional," she said following her free skate, "I'm so happy that I could show the programs the way I did them in practice, as I trained them very hard every day. I'm just so grateful. So the biggest thank you to my team, to my coaching team, my parents, my sister for supporting me. I'm just super happy."

==== 2026–27 season ====
Joos opened her season by placing second at the 2026 Tallinn Open. She later went onto place fifth at the 2026 CS Lombardia Trophy.

Joos made her senior Grand Prix debut at the 2026 Grand Prix de France, concluding the event in eighth place overall. "I'm very happy. It was a beautiful experience, and I'm grateful for all the support. I felt really good during the program. It's special to be here for the first time and to show what I've been working on every day with so much dedication. I wasn’t stressed at all, the audience is so supportive here!" shares Joos.

== Programs ==
Season	Short program	Free skating
2026–2027	"Game of Thrones": Jenny of Oldstones by Florence + The Machine and Ramin Djawadi; The Night King by Ramin Djawadi	I Medici; Ascent; War; Love for Duty; Renaissance; The Conclave Procession; Lorenzo the Magnificent by Paolo Buonvino choreo. by Matteo Zanni
2025–2026	Wake of Death (Reunited) by Guy Farley; Reminiscence by Jakub Pietras choreo. by Matteo Zanni	I Medici; Ascent; War; Love for Duty; Renaissance; The Conclave Procession; Lorenzo the Magnificent by Paolo Buonvino choreo. by Matteo Zanni
2024–2025	Magnificat by Mina choreo. by Edoardo De Bernardis	The Crown; Fairytale; William; Sacrifice by Martin Phipps; How Soon Is Now? by The Smiths performed by AG ft. Dresage choreo. by Edoardo De Bernardis
2023–2024	Caruso by Lucio Dalla performed by Lara Fabian choreo. by Lorenzo Magri; Après moi by Regina Spektor choreo. by Barbara Riboldi	A Beautiful Storm by Jennifer Thomas; Mercy in Darkness by Two Steps from Hell; Gefion by Christian Reindl and Lucie Paradis choreo. by Lorenzo Magri; Dreamcatcher by Secret Garden; Finale (from East of Eden) by Lee Holdridge choreo. by Stéphane Lambiel
2022–2023	Après moi by Regina Spektor choreo. by Barbara Riboldi	Dreamcatcher by Secret Garden; Finale (from East of Eden) by Lee Holdridge choreo. by Stéphane Lambiel
2021–2022	Rome by Jeff Beal; Marco Polo: Main Theme by Yo-Yo Ma, Ennio Morricone; Nights from the Alhambra by Loreena McKennitt choreo. by Nikolai Morozov, Barbara Riboldi, Maja Luther	Violin Concerto in D, Op. 35: I. Allegro moderato by Pyotr Ilyich Tchaikovsky performed by Joshua Bell choreo. by Nikolai Morozov, Barbara Riboldi, Maja Luther

== Competitive highlights ==
- JGP – Event of the ISU Junior Grand Prix Series
- CS – Event of the ISU Challenger Series

=== Single skating (for Italy) ===
Competition placements at senior level
Season	2023–24	2024–25	2025–26	2026–27
World Championships	20th			
European Championships	6th		6th	
Italian Championships	1st		2nd	
GP France				8th
CS Golden Spin of Zagreb	1st			
CS Lombardia Trophy				5th
CS Nepela Memorial		5th	3rd	
CS Tallinn Trophy	1st			5th
CS Warsaw Cup			4th	
Diamond Spin			1st	
Ice Challenge				2nd
Robin Cousins Cup			1st	
Tirnavia Ice Cup		4th		
Tallinn Open				2nd
Tayside Trophy				4th

Competition placements at junior level
Season	2023–24	2024–25
World Junior Championships	7th	
JGP Czech Republic		10th
JGP Latvia		10th
Tallink Hotels Cup	1st	
Triglav Trophy	1st	

=== Single skating (for Switzerland) ===
Competition placements at senior level
Season	2022–23
Swiss Championships	3rd
CS Lombardia Trophy	7th
CS Warsaw Cup	2nd

Competition placements at junior level
Season	2019–20	2021–22	2022–23
Swiss Championships	3rd	2nd	
JGP Czech Republic			7th
JGP Poland		11th	12th
European Youth Olympic Festival		3rd	
Ice Challenge			1st
Merano Ice Trophy		2nd	
Tirnavia Ice Cup		2nd	

== Detailed results ==
ISU personal best scores in the +5/-5 GOE System
Segment	Type	Score	Event
Total	TSS	180.83	2024 European Championships
Short program	TSS	63.67	2026 Grand Prix de France
Short program	TES	36.73	2023 CS Golden Spin of Zagreb
Short program	PCS	28.45	2024 World Championships
Free skating	TSS	121.01	2024 European Championships
Free skating	TES	65.64	2025 CS Nepela Memorial
Free skating	PCS	57.88	2024 European Championships

=== Single skating (for Italy) ===
==== Senior level ====
Results in the 2023–24 season
Date	Event	SP		FS		Total	
Date	Event	P	Score	P	Score	P	Score
Nov 21–24, 2023	(Estonia) 2023 Tallinn Trophy	2	61.55	1	120.35	1	181.90
Dec 6–9, 2023	(Croatia) 2023 CS Golden Spin of Zagreb	1	63.59	1	115.81	1	179.40
Dec 22–23, 2023	(Italy) 2024 Italian Championships	2	65.27	2	127.52	1	192.79
Jan 10–14, 2024	(Lithuania) 2024 European Championships	9	59.82	5	121.01	6	180.83
Mar 18–24, 2024	(Canada) 2024 World Championships	19	59.39	19	107.65	20	167.04

Results in the 2024–25 season
Date	Event	SP		FS		Total	
Date	Event	P	Score	P	Score	P	Score
Oct 24–26, 2024	(Czech Republic) 2024 CS Nepela Memorial	8	51.41	5	104.63	5	156.04
Nov 1–3, 2024	(Slovakia) 2024 Tirnavia Ice Cup	3	49.49	3	99.32	4	148.81

Results in the 2025–26 season
Date	Event	SP		FS		Total	
Date	Event	P	Score	P	Score	P	Score
Aug 21–22, 2025	(United Kingdom) 2025 Robin Cousins Cup	1	59.62	1	127.37	1	186.99
Sep 25–27, 2025	(Slovakia) 2025 CS Nepela Memorial	5	59.85	4	120.51	3	180.36
Oct 16–19, 2025	(Poland) 2025 Diamond Spin	1	63.24	1	122.26	1	185.50
Nov 19–23, 2025	(Poland) 2025 CS Warsaw Cup	4	54.99	4	104.23	4	159.22
Dec 17–20, 2025	(Italy) 2026 Italian Championships	2	63.51	2	126.30	2	189.81
Jan 13–18, 2026	(United Kingdom) 2026 European Championships	7	58.90	5	121.94	6	180.84

Results in the 2026–27 season
Date	Event	SP		FS		Total	
Date	Event	P	Score	P	Score	P	Score
Sep 11–13, 2026	(Estonia) 2026 Tallinn Open	2	56.67	2	107.00	2	163.67
Sep 17–20, 2026	(Italy) 2026 CS Lombardia Trophy	7	57.89	5	116.24	5	174.13
Oct 10–11, 2026	(United Kingdom) 2026 Tayside Trophy	2	65.29	4	111.06	4	176.35
Oct 23-25, 2026	2026 Grand Prix de France	6	63.67	8	112.09	8	175.76
Nov 5–8, 2026	(Austria) 2026 Ice Challenge	2	59.07	1	118.05	2	177.12
Nov 16–22, 2026	(Estonia) 2026 CS Tallinn Trophy	4	63.48	6	111.97	5	175.45

==== Junior level ====
Results in the 2023–24 season
Date	Event	SP		FS		Total	
Date	Event	P	Score	P	Score	P	Score
Feb 15–18, 2024	(Estonia) 2024 Tallink Hotels Cup	1	63.13	1	116.52	1	179.65
Feb 26 – Mar 3, 2024	(Taiwan) 2024 World Junior Championships	14	57.66	5	117.07	7	174.73
Apr 10–14, 2024	(Slovenia) 2024 Triglav Trophy	1	58.75	1	116.97	1	175.72

Results in the 2024–25 season
Date	Event	SP		FS		Total	
Date	Event	P	Score	P	Score	P	Score
Aug 28–31, 2024	2024 JGP Latvia	6	56.69	12	89.40	10	146.09
Sep 4–7, 2024	2024 JGP Czech Republic	8	55.41	10	102.03	10	157.44

=== Single skating (for Switzerland) ===
==== Senior level ====
2022–23 season
Date	Event	SP	FS	Total
December 15–16, 2022	2023 Swiss Championships	2; 59.52	3; 109.46	3; 168.98
November 17–20, 2022	2022 CS Warsaw Cup	3; 58.76	2; 121.55	2; 174.96
September 16–19, 2022	2022 CS Lombardia Trophy	11; 51.31	7; 109.93	7; 161.24

==== Junior level ====
2022–23 season
Date	Event	SP	FS	Total
November 9–13, 2022	2022 Ice Challenge	3; 48.00	1; 105.18	1; 153.18
October 5–8, 2022	2022 JGP Poland II	10; 53.79	14; 95.57	12; 149.36
August 31–September 3, 2022	2022 JGP Czech Republic	9; 54.72	7; 102.63	7; 157.35
2021–22 season
Date	Event	SP	FS	Total
March 20–25, 2022	2022 European Youth Olympic Winter Festival	5; 50.25	2; 103.18	3; 153.43
February 5–6, 2022	2022 Merano Cup	2; 45.39	2; 92.56	2; 137.95
January 22–23, 2022	2022 Swiss Junior Championships	2; 55.88	2; 94.40	2; 150.28
October 28–31, 2021	2021 Tirnavia Ice Cup	2; 46.40	2; 86.27	2; 132.67
September 28–October 2, 2021	2021 JGP Poland I	11; 44.71	11; 82.28	11; 126.99
2019–20 season
Date	Event	SP	FS	Total
February 1–2, 2020	2020 Swiss Junior Championships	7; 42.68	3; 81.91	3; 124.59
