= Negrinho River =

Negrinho River may refer to:

- Negrinho River (Mafra, Santa Catarina)
- Negrinho River (Mato Grosso do Sul)

== See also ==
- Neagra River (disambiguation)
- Negrea River (disambiguation)
