= Marius Negrea =

Romanian figure skater (born 1964)

Personal information
- Full name: Marius Cristian Negrea
- Born: 27 October 1964 (age 61) Braşov, Romania
- Height: 1.80 m (5 ft 11 in)

Figure skating career
- Country: Romania
- Retired: 1997

Marius Cristian Negrea (born 27 October 1964) is a Romanian former competitive figure skater. He represented Romania at the 1992 Winter Olympics and the 1994 Winter Olympics, placing 27th in 1992 (failing to qualify for the free skate) and 19th in 1994. His best result at an ISU Championship was 15th at the 1992 European Championships in Lausanne, Switzerland.

Negrea was the 1992 Romanian national champion, and the 1995 Swiss national champion.

Following his competitive retirement, Negrea began working as a coach. His current and former students include Gheorghe Chiper, Adrian Matei, Roxana Luca and Julia Sauter. In 2018, he worked as a Winter Olympics commentator for Romanian Television.

He currently coaches in Ravensburg, Germany.

== Competitive highlights ==
Event	82-83	83-84	84-85	87-88	88-89	89-90	90-91	91-92	92–93	93–94	94–95	95–96	96–97
Winter Olympics								27th		19th			
World Championships										27th			
European Championships								15th					25th
Romanian Championships	3rd	3rd	2nd	2nd	3rd	2nd	2nd	1st	3rd	2nd		3rd	2nd
Swiss Championships											1st		
Golden Spin of Zagreb							4th					1st	9th
Karl Schäfer Memorial							3rd	8th	18th				
Nebelhorn Trophy							13th	10th	9th	13th			
Ondrej Nepela Trophy										5th			
Penta Cup									2nd				
Piruetten									8th				
Skate Israel												9th	
St. Gervais									7th	4th			
Trophée Lalique										11th			
Winter Universiade					15th								
