= Apa Neagră =

Apa Neagră may refer to the following places in Romania:

- Apa Neagră, a village in Padeș Commune, Gorj County
- Apa Neagră, a tributary of the river Zeletin in Bacău County

== See also ==
- Neagra (disambiguation)
- Valea Neagră River (disambiguation)
