= Sabina Măriuță =

Romanian figure skater

Sabina Măriuţă
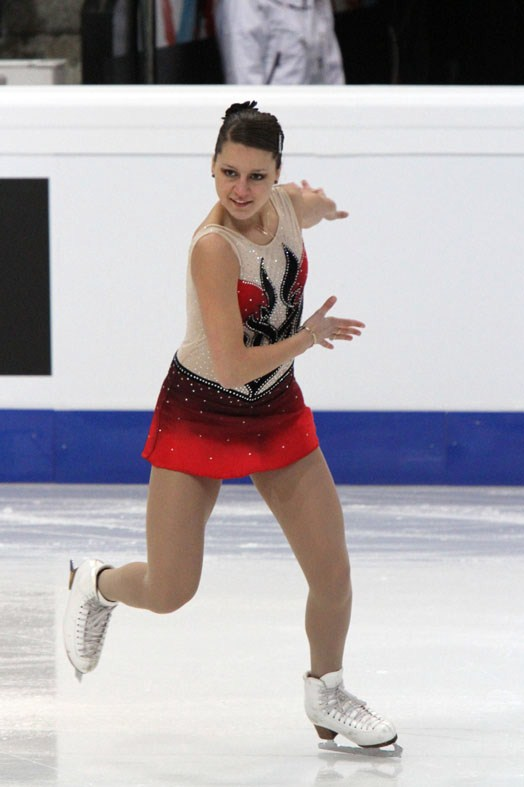
- Măriuţă in 2011

Personal information
- Full name: Sabina Măriuţă
- Born: 4 February 1995 (age 31) Iași, Romania
- Home town: Brossard, Quebec, Canada
- Height: 1.68 m (5 ft 6 in)

Figure skating career
- Country: Romania
- Coach: Nicolas Young; Josee Normand
- Skating club: University SC Brasov
- Began skating: 2002

Sabina Măriuţă (born 4 February 1995 in Iași) is a Romanian former figure skater. She is the 2011 Romanian national champion.

== Programs ==
Season	Short program	Free skating
2012–2013	Swan Lake by Pyotr Tchaikovsky	Romeo and Juliet by Nino Rota
2011–2012	Rhapsody on a theme of Paganini by Sergei Rachmaninoff	Memoirs of a Geisha by John Williams
2010–2011	Piano Fantasy by William Joseph	Carmen by Georges Bizet
2008–2009	Who's That Creeping; Jumping Jack by Big Bad Voodoo Daddy	Psycho Acoustic Ouverture; Cobra Negra by Bend Steidl

== Competitive highlights ==
International
Event	08–09	09–10	10–11	11–12	12–13	13–14
World Champ.			14th P	43rd		
European Champ.			18th P	21st P	34th	
Nebelhorn Trophy						28th
Crystal Skate		16th	6th		3rd	
Istanbul Cup				8th		
International: Junior
JGP France			27th			
JGP Italy	28th					
JGP Romania			21st			
JGP United Kingdom	25th					
Santa Claus Cup			11th J			
EYOF			21st J			
National
Romanian Championships		2nd	1st		1st	
