= Ana Sofia Beșchea =

Romanian figure skater (born 2004)

Ana Sofia Beşchea
Personal information
- Full name: Ana Sofia Beşchea
- Born: 14 May 2004 (age 22) Bucharest, Romania
- Home town: Bucharest, Romania
- Height: 1.66 m (5 ft 5 in)

Figure skating career
- Country: Romania
- Coach: Andreea Pascu
- Skating club: Ulisse Bucharest
- Began skating: 2010

Medal record
Romanian Championships
Gold medal – first place	2020 Otopeni	Singles
Gold medal – first place	2021 Miercurea Ciuc	Singles
Silver medal – second place	2022 Miercurea Ciuc	Singles
Silver medal – second place	2024 Otopeni	Singles
Silver medal – second place	2025 Otopeni	Singles
Silver medal – second place	2026 Székesfehérvár	Singles

Ana Sofia Beşchea is a Romanian figure skater. At the 2020 Romanian championships, she won both the senior and junior women's titles.

== Career ==
=== Early years ===
Beşchea began learning to skate in 2010 in Bucharest. She competed internationally from a young age, initially in the novice categories. In the 2016–17 season, she competed as an advanced novice, winning the Romanian Youth Championships and the Olympic Hopes competition in Romania.

In the following season she moved to the junior level. She made her ISU Junior Grand Prix debut at the 2017 JGP Egna, finishing 23rd. During the season, she also won the junior event at the Edu Sport Trophy and finished second at the Romanian Junior Championships.

=== 2018–19 season ===
Beşchea competed at the Junior Grand Prix event in Bratislava, placing 25th with a total score of 101.87 points.

She represented Romania at the 2019 European Youth Olympic Winter Festival in Sarajevo, finishing 25th. She was subsequently selected for the 2019 World Junior Figure Skating Championships in Zagreb. Beşchea scored 39.95 points in the short program and finished 37th, failing to advance to the free skate.

=== 2019–20 season ===
Beşchea continued on the Junior Grand Prix circuit at the 2019 JGP Egna/Neumarkt, where she placed 23rd with 97.33 points. She also competed at several international events, including the Denkova-Staviski Cup, Edu Sport Trophy, Skate Helena and Sofia Trophy.

At the Romanian championships she won both the senior and junior women's titles.

Beşchea represented Romania for a second consecutive year at the 2020 World Junior Figure Skating Championships in Tallinn, where she placed 47th in the short program and did not advance to the free skate.

=== 2020–21 season ===
The international season was substantially affected by the COVID-19 pandemic. Beşchea had limited opportunities to compete internationally but retained her Romanian senior national title.

=== 2021–22 season ===
Returning to the ISU Junior Grand Prix, Beşchea competed at the 2021 JGP Austria in Linz, finishing 29th. Later in the season, she won the Romanian junior title and took the silver medal in the senior competition.

She competed internationally as a senior at Skate Helena before winning the Bellu Memorial in Otopeni, scoring 156.51 points.

Beşchea represented Romania at the 2022 World Junior Figure Skating Championships in Tallinn. She placed 42nd in the short program and did not qualify for the free skate.

=== 2022–23 season ===
Beşchea opened her international season on the Junior Grand Prix circuit, finishing 30th at the 2022 JGP Latvia in Riga. In December, she won the junior women's competition at the Cupa Magie de Crăciun in Romania.

She also competed at senior level, finishing fifth at the Edu Sport Trophy and participating in the Bellu Memorial.

At the 2023 World Junior Figure Skating Championships in Calgary, Beşchea placed 44th in the short program and did not advance to the free skate. It was her fourth appearance at the World Junior Championships.

=== 2023–24 season ===
Beşchea competed exclusively at senior level internationally during the season. Her early events included the Denkova-Staviski Cup, where she finished 13th, Skate Celje, where she placed seventh, and the Bosphorus Cup, where she finished tenth.

At the Edu Sport Trophy in Otopeni, she placed fifth with a total score of 147.33 points. She also finished as the Romanian national silver medalist.

Beşchea made her senior European debut at the 2024 European Championships in Kaunas, Lithuania. She scored 37.52 points in the short program and finished 33rd, failing to advance to the free skate.

She concluded the season with a tenth-place finish at the Bellu Memorial.

=== 2024–25 season ===
Beşchea began the season by finishing fifth at the Crystal Skate of Romania. This also served as the Romanian national championships; she finished second among the competitors from Romania and won the silver medal. She subsequently placed eleventh at the NRW Trophy in Dortmund and fourth at the Edu Sport Trophy, where she scored 140.88 points.

Beşchea was selected to represent Romania at the 2025 European Championships in Tallinn. She scored 36.60 points in the short program and finished 31st, missing qualification for the free skate.

=== 2025–26 season ===
Beşchea began the season at the 2025–26 ISU Challenger Series, competing at the 2025 Nepela Memorial in Bratislava. She finished 21st with a total score of 103.42 points. Her free-skating score of 66.77 points became an ISU personal best.

She subsequently finished 20th at the Denkova-Staviski Cup and eighth at Skate Fehérvár in Székesfehérvár, Hungary. The Romanian national championships were held concurrently with Skate Fehérvár; Beşchea finished second among the Romanian competitors.

In January 2026, Beşchea finished fourth at the Crystal Skate of Romania with 120.17 points. The following month, she was fourth at the Bellu Memorial, scoring 113.57 points.

== Programs ==
Season	Short program	Free skating
2025–26	The Sound of Silence performed by Cinematic Pop featuring McKenna Breinholt	Per Te performed by Josh Groban
2024–25	Exogenesis Symphony Part 3 by Muse	Per Te performed by Josh Groban choreo. by Maria Andreea Coroama, Andrea Vaturi
2023–24	Exogenesis Symphony Part 3 by Muse	Caruso performed by Jackie Evancho choreo. by Maria Andreea Coroama, Andrea Vaturi
2022–23	Skyfall from Skyfall performed by Adele	Caruso by Lucio Dalla performed by Jackie Evancho choreo. by Maria Andreea Coroama
2021–22	Skyfall from Skyfall performed by Adele	Caruso by Lucio Dalla performed by Jackie Evancho choreo. by Maria Andreea Coroama

== Competitive highlights ==
- CS – Event of the ISU Challenger Series
- JGP – Event of the ISU Junior Grand Prix

Event	17–18	18–19	19–20	20–21	21–22	22–23	23–24	24–25	25–26
European Championships							33rd	31st	
Romanian Championships			1st	1st	2nd		2nd	2nd	2nd
Romanian Championships (Junior)	2nd	3rd	1st	2nd	1st				
CS Nepela Memorial									21st
Bellu Memorial					1st	8th	10th		4th
Crystal Skate of Romania								5th	4th
Denkova-Staviski Cup							13th		20th
EduSport Trophy						5th	5th	4th	
NRW Trophy								11th	
Skate Celje							7th		
Skate Fehérvár									8th
Bosphorus Cup							10th		
Skate Helena					6th				
Sofia Trophy			10th						
World Junior Championships		37th	47th		42nd	44th			
JGP Austria					29th				
JGP Italy	23rd		23rd						
JGP Latvia						30th			
JGP Slovakia		25th							
European Youth Olympic Festival		25th							
Cupa Magie de Crăciun						1st			
EduSport Trophy	1st	7th	2nd						
Crystal Skate of Romania	2nd	4th							
Denkova-Staviski Cup	4th		6th						
Skate Celje					4th				
Skate Helena			10th						
Black Sea Ice Cup			7th						

== Detailed results ==
ISU personal best scores in the +5/-5 GOE System
Segment	Type	Score	Event
Total	TSS	103.42	2025 CS Ondrej Nepela Memorial
Short program	TSS	39.95	2019 World Junior Championships
Short program	TES	66.77	2025 CS Ondrej Nepela Memorial
Short program	PCS		
Free skating	TSS		
Free skating	TES		
Free skating	PCS		

=== Senior level ===
2025–26 season
Date	Event	SP	FS	Total
25–28 February 2026	2026 Bellu Memorial	5; 40.21	4; 73.36	4; 113.57
14–17 January 2026	2026 Crystal Skate of Romania	4; 41.27	4; 78.90	4; 120.17
4–7 December 2025	2025 Skate Fehérvár	8; 39.99	8; 67.93	8; 107.92
4–9 November 2025	2025 Denkova-Staviski Cup	15; 46.76	23; 74.21	20; 120.97
25–27 September 2025	2025 CS Ondrej Nepela Memorial	22; 36.65	21; 66.77	21; 103.42
2024–25 season
Date	Event	SP	FS	Total
28–31 January 2025	2025 European Figure Skating Championships	31; 36.60	—	31
9–12 December 2024	2024 Edu Sport Trophy	6; 48.47	5; 92.41	4; 140.88
13–17 November 2024	2024 NRW Trophy	12; 37.00	11; 72.79	11; 109.79
23–26 October 2024	2024 Crystal Skate of Romania	5; 40.99	5; 71.97	5; 112.96
2023–24 season
Date	Event	SP	FS	Total
20–25 February 2024	2024 Bellu Memorial	9; 42.02	10; 69.17	10; 111.19
8–14 January 2024	2024 European Figure Skating Championships	33; 37.52	—	33
6–10 December 2023	2023 Edu Sport Trophy	5; 53.90	4; 93.43	5; 147.33
27 November – 3 December 2023	2023 Bosphorus Cup	10; 40.15	6; 86.77	10; 126.92
16–19 November 2023	2023 Skate Celje	7; 37.46	7; 69.56	7; 107.02
7–12 November 2023	2023 Denkova-Staviski Cup	11; 43.52	13; 84.18	13; 127.70
2022–23 season
Date	Event	SP	FS	Total
22–26 February 2023	2023 Bellu Memorial	8; 43.45	—	8
11–15 January 2023	2022 Edu Sport Trophy	5; 44.98	5; 83.61	5; 128.59
2021–22 season
Date	Event	SP	FS	Total
23–27 February 2022	2022 Bellu Memorial	1; 53.58	1; 102.93	1; 156.51
19–23 January 2022	2022 Skate Helena	5; 46.78	5; 88.95	6; 135.73
11–12 December 2021	2022 Romanian Championships	2; 40.95	2; 88.83	2; 129.78
2020–21 season
Date	Event	SP	FS	Total
2020–21	2021 Romanian Championships	—	—	1
2019–20 season
Date	Event	SP	FS	Total
12–16 February 2020	2020 Sofia Trophy	12; 41.05	10; 79.43	10; 120.48

=== Junior level ===
2022–23 season
Date	Event	SP	FS	Total
27 February – 5 March 2023	2023 World Junior Figure Skating Championships	44; 36.06	—	44
8–11 December 2022	Cupa Magie de Crăciun	2; 49.62	1; 89.44	1; 139.06
6–10 September 2022	2022 JGP Riga	28; 34.25	31; 64.99	30; 99.24
2021–22 season
Date	Event	SP	FS	Total
13–17 April 2022	2022 World Junior Figure Skating Championships	42; 35.53	—	42
11–12 December 2021	2022 Romanian Junior Championships	1; 46.29	1; 86.64	1; 132.93
19–21 November 2021	2021 Skate Celje	6; 46.48	4; 78.96	4; 125.44
7–9 October 2021	2021 JGP Austria	27; 37.37	28; 64.01	29; 101.38
2019–20 season
Date	Event	SP	FS	Total
2–8 March 2020	2020 World Junior Figure Skating Championships	47; 33.77	—	47
16–19 January 2020	2020 Skate Helena	13; 38.29	7; 77.68	10; 115.97
8–12 January 2020	2020 Edu Sport Trophy	2; 39.48	2; 76.73	2; 116.21
12–17 November 2019	2019 Denkova-Staviski Cup	8; 37.09	6; 73.32	6; 110.41
2–5 October 2019	2019 JGP Egna	21; 36.13	23; 61.20	23; 97.33
19–22 September 2019	2019 Black Sea Ice Cup	8; 32.27	5; 71.77	7; 104.04
2018–19 season
Date	Event	SP	FS	Total
4–10 March 2019	2019 World Junior Figure Skating Championships	37; 39.95	—	37
13–15 February 2019	2019 European Youth Olympic Winter Festival	23; 34.82	25; 63.68	25; 98.50
9–13 January 2019	2019 Edu Sport Trophy	4; 38.27	7; 68.62	7; 106.89
24–27 October 2018	2018 Crystal Skate of Romania	2; 44.30	4; 72.83	4; 117.13
22–25 August 2018	2018 JGP Bratislava	26; 36.28	24; 65.59	25; 101.87
2017–18 season
Date	Event	SP	FS	Total
14–17 February 2018	2018 Olympic Hopes	2; 41.07	3; 81.33	3; 122.40
14–17 February 2018	2018 Romanian Junior Championships	1; 41.07	2; 81.33	2; 122.40
6–11 February 2018	2018 Sofia Trophy	5; 42.72	9; 77.27	8; 119.99
4–7 January 2018	2018 Edu Sport Trophy	2; 40.12	1; 81.04	1; 121.16
31 October – 5 November 2017	2017 Denkova-Staviski Cup	5; 45.78	4; 84.34	4; 130.12
24–27 October 2017	2017 Crystal Skate of Romania	2; 44.09	2; 73.33	2; 117.42
11–14 October 2017	2017 JGP Egna	26; 29.80	23; 65.64	23; 95.44
