= Negrea (surname) =

Negrea is a Romanian surname. Notable people with the surname include:

- Alex Negrea (born 1998), Romanian footballer
- Carla Negrea (born 1974), Romanian swimmer
- Dan Negrea (born 1957), American diplomat and financial executive
- Gheorghe Negrea (1934–2000), Romanian boxer
- Irina Negrea (born 1952), Romanian literary translator, journalist and editor
- Marius Negrea (born 1964), Romanian figure skater
- Oana Negrea (born 2000), Romanian footballer
- Vasile Negrea (born 1942), Romanian footballer
