= 2024 European Figure Skating Championships =

European figure skating competition

- Type: ISU Championship
- Date: 10 – 14 January
- Season: 2023-24
- Location: Kaunas, Lithuania
- Host: Lithuanian Skating Federation
- Venue: Žalgiris Arena

Champions
- Men's singles: (France) Adam Siao Him Fa
- Women's singles: (Belgium) Loena Hendrickx
- Pairs: (Italy) Lucrezia Beccari and Matteo Guarise
- Ice dance: (Italy) Charlène Guignard and Marco Fabbri
- Previous: 2023 European Championships
- Next: 2025 European Championships

The 2024 European Figure Skating Championships were held from 10 to 14 January 2024 at the Žalgiris Arena in Kaunas, Lithuania. The competition was sanctioned by the International Skating Union (ISU) and hosted by the Lithuanian Skating Federation. Medals were awarded in men's singles, women's singles, pair skating, and ice dance. The competition determined the entry quotas for each skating federation at the 2025 European Championships.

The ISU published a complete list of entries on 19 December 2023. Adam Siao Him Fa of France won the men's event, Loena Hendrickx of Belgium won the women's event, Lucrezia Beccari and Matteo Guarise of Italy won the pairs event, and Charlène Guignard and Marco Fabbri of Italy won the ice dance event.

== Background ==
In 2021, the ISU received applications to host the 2024 European Championships from Budapest, Hungary; Minsk, Belarus; Sofia, Bulgaria; Zagreb, Croatia; Bratislava, Slovakia; and Ostrava, Czech Republic.

In early 2023, Hungary withdrew from hosting the championships due to financial difficulties. The ISU received new bids to host the competition from Sofia, Bulgaria; Warsaw, Poland; and Kaunas, Lithuania. On June 12, 2023, the Lithuanian Skating Federation announced that they had received confirmation from that ISU that Kaunas would serve as host.

== Qualification ==
=== Age and minimum TES requirements ===
The competition was open to skaters from all European member nations of the International Skating Union. The corresponding competition for non-European skaters was the 2024 Four Continents Championships.

Skaters were eligible for the 2024 European Championships if they turned 16 years of age before July 1, 2023, and if they met the minimum technical elements score requirements. The ISU accepted technical minimum scores if they were obtained at senior-level ISU-recognized international competitions during the ongoing season at least 21 days before the first official practice day of the championships or during the preceding season.

Minimum technical scores
Discipline	SP/RD	FS/FD
Men	28	46
Women	25	42
Pairs	25	42
Ice dance	30	48

=== Number of entries per discipline ===
Based on the results of the 2023 European Championships, each European ISU member nation could field one to three entries per discipline. Russia and Belarus were banned from participating "until further notice" due to the 2022 Russian invasion of Ukraine. If not listed on this table, the nation could field one entry per discipline.

Number of entries per discipline
Spots	Men	Women	Pairs	Ice dance
3	France; Italy	Belgium; Georgia	Germany; Italy	France; Great Britain; Italy
2	Estonia; Georgia; Latvia; Sweden; Switzerland	Estonia; Finland; Germany; Italy; Poland; Romania; Switzerland	France; Great Britain; Hungary; Netherlands; Ukraine	Czech Republic; Finland; Georgia; Germany; Hungary; Lithuania; Ukraine

== Medal summary ==
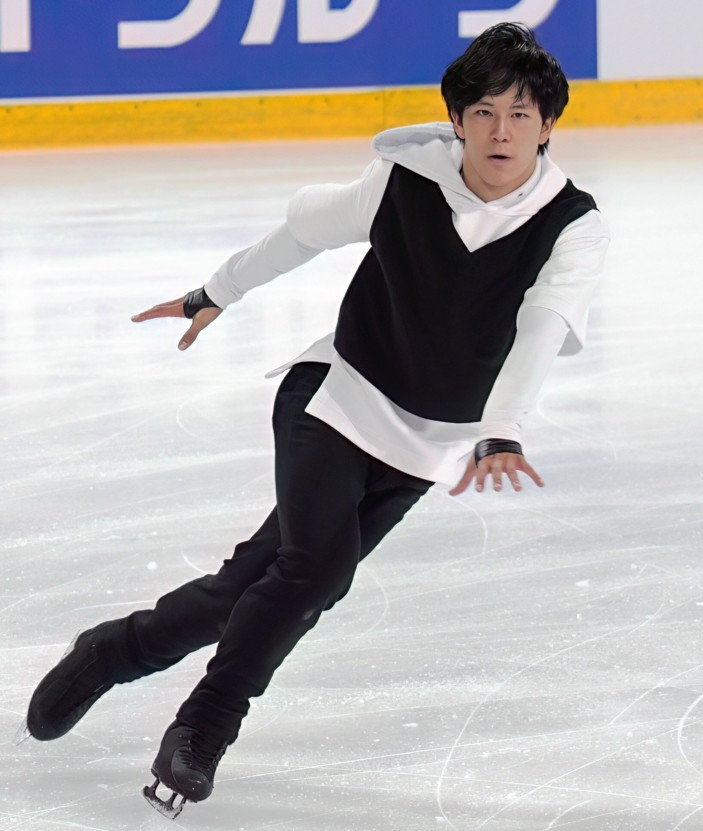
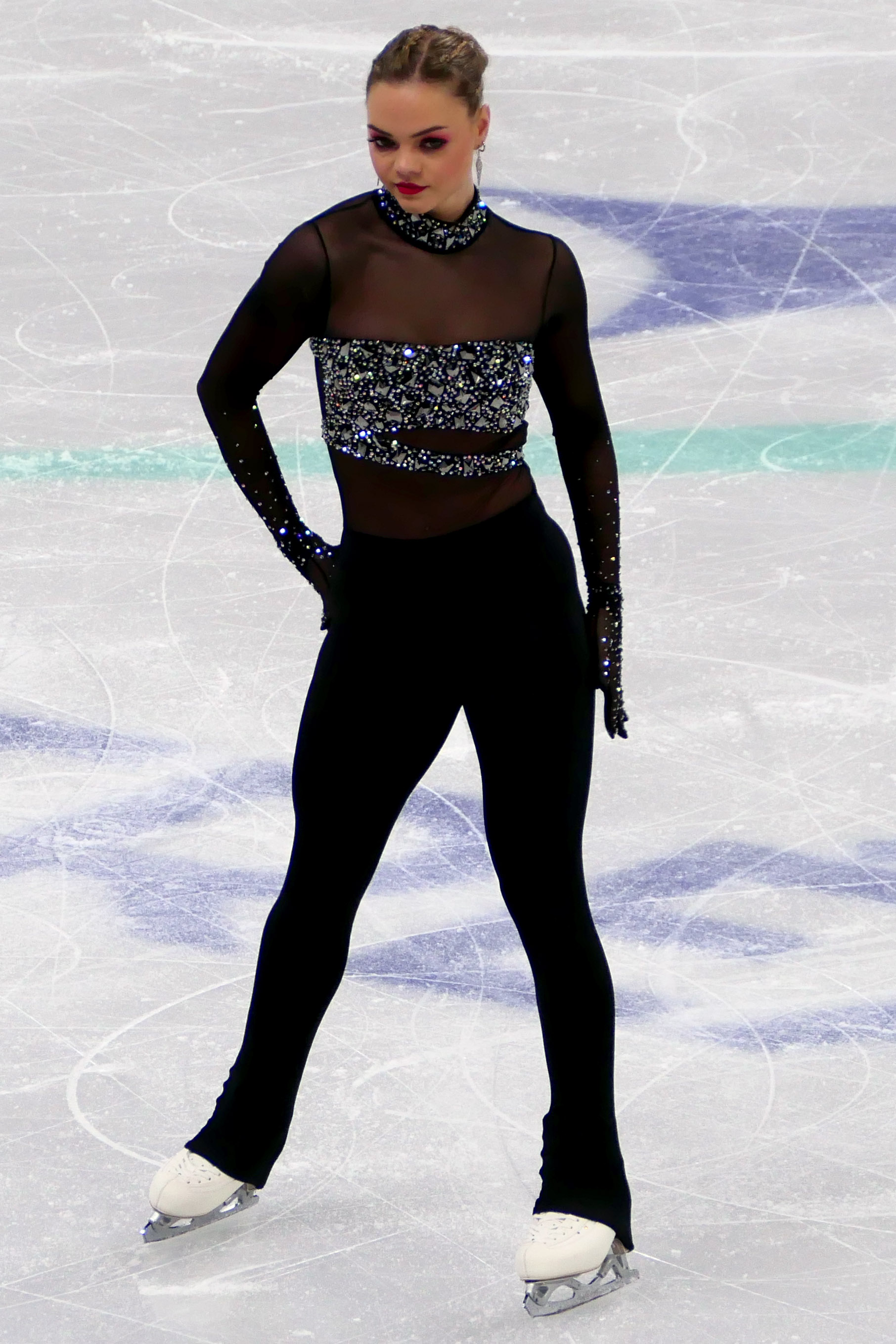
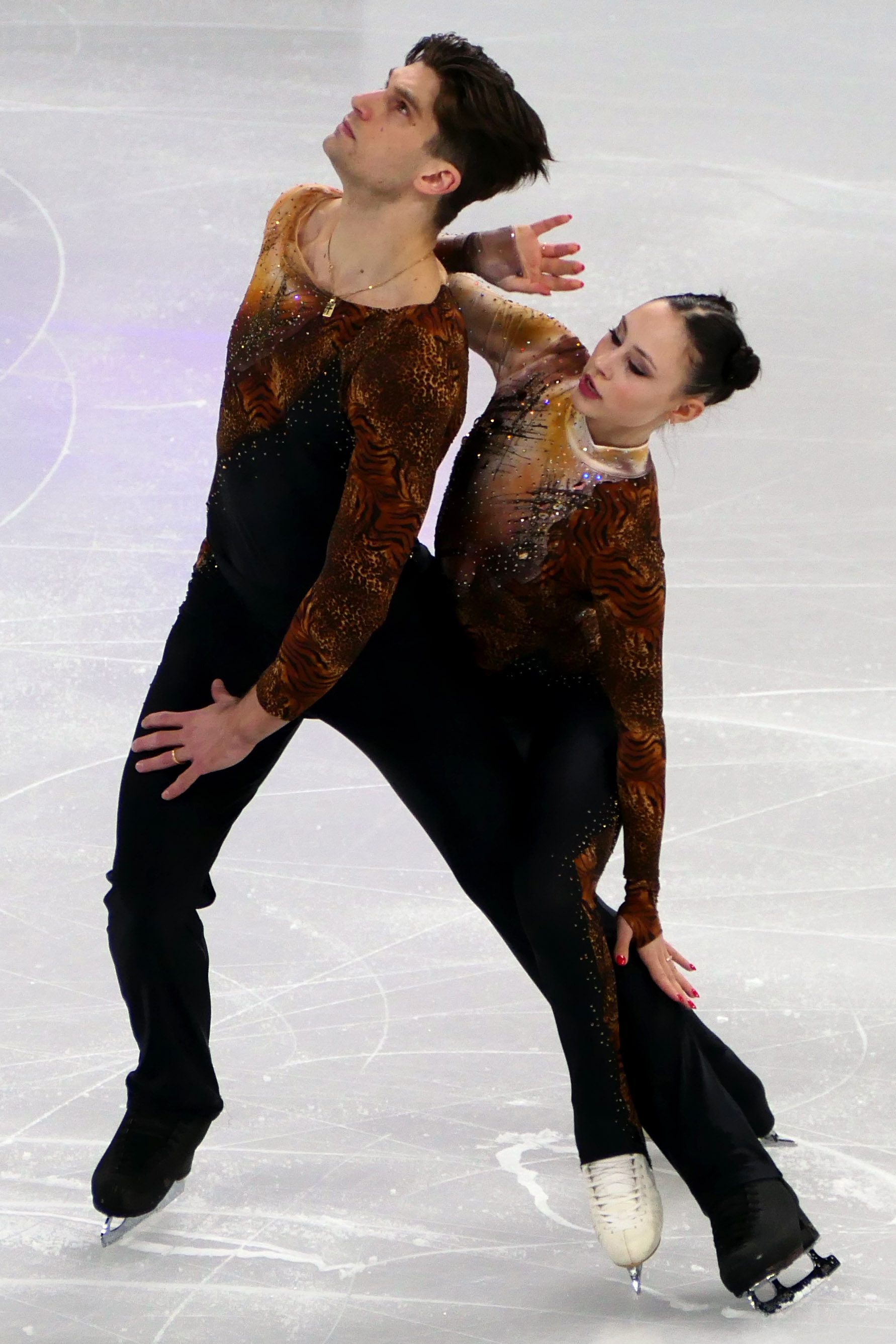
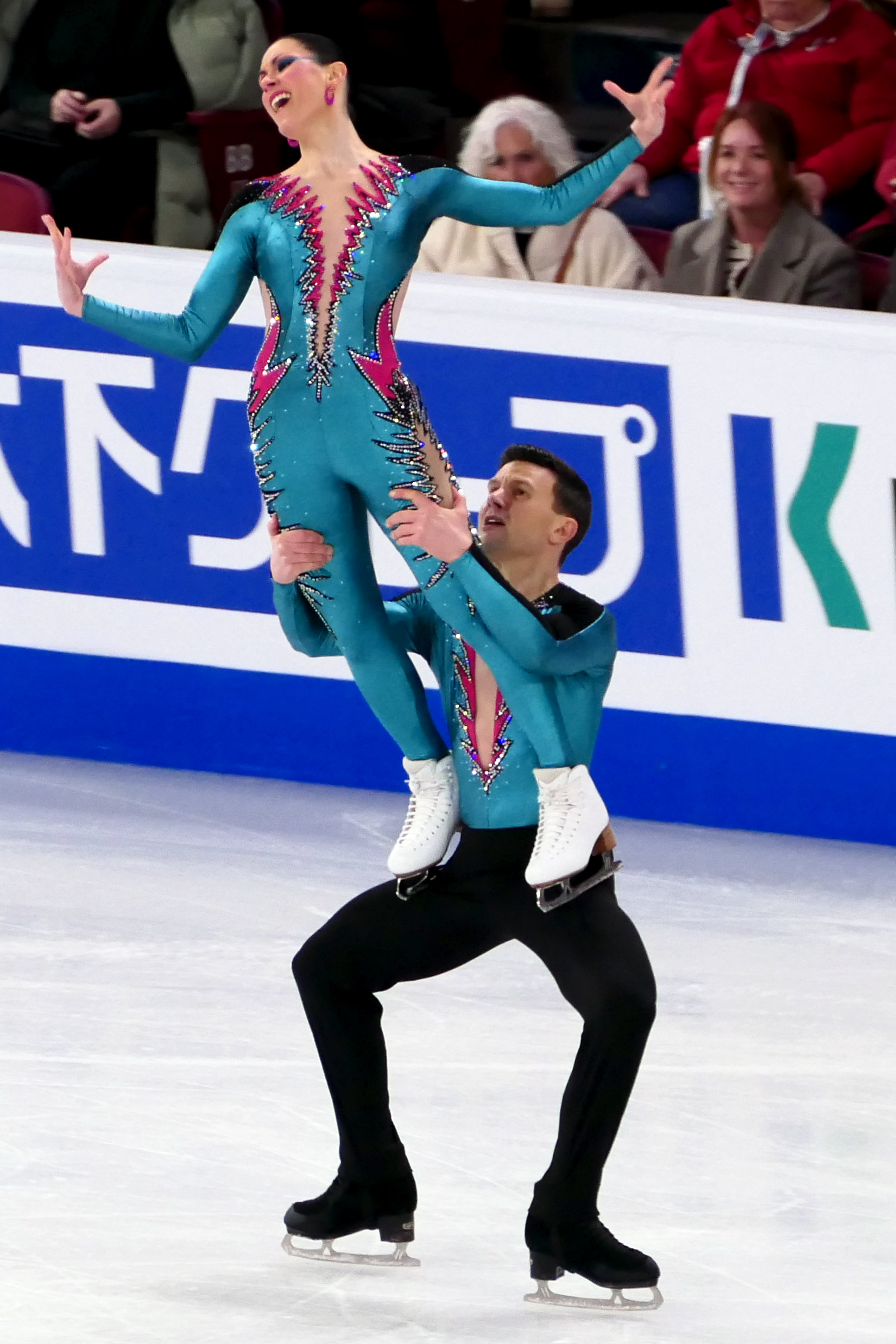
From left to right: The 2024 European Champions: Adam Siao Him Fa of France (men's singles); Loena Hendrickx of Belgium (women's singles); Lucrezia Beccari and Matteo Guarise of Italy (pair skating); and Charlène Guignard and Marco Fabbri of Italy (ice dance)

=== Medalists ===
Medals were awarded to the skaters or teams who achieved the highest overall placements in each discipline.

Medal recipients
Discipline	Gold	Silver	Bronze
Men	(France); Adam Siao Him Fa	(Estonia); Aleksandr Selevko	(Italy); Matteo Rizzo
Women	(Belgium); Loena Hendrickx	(Georgia (country)); Anastasiia Gubanova	(Belgium); Nina Pinzarrone
Pairs	(Italy); Lucrezia Beccari; Matteo Guarise	(Georgia (country)); Anastasiia Metelkina; Luka Berulava	(Italy); Rebecca Ghilardi; Filippo Ambrosini
Ice dance	(Italy); Charlène Guignard; Marco Fabbri	(United Kingdom); Lilah Fear; Lewis Gibson	(Lithuania); Allison Reed; Saulius Ambrulevičius

Small medals were awarded to the skaters or teams who achieved the highest short program or rhythm dance placements in each discipline.

Small medal recipients for highest short program or rhythm dance
Discipline	Gold	Silver	Bronze
Men	(France); Adam Siao Him Fa	(Switzerland); Lukas Britschgi	(Estonia); Aleksandr Selevko
Women	(Belgium); Loena Hendrickx	(Belgium); Nina Pinzarrone	(Georgia (country)); Anastasiia Gubanova
Pairs	(Georgia (country)); Anastasia Metelkina; Luka Berulava	(Germany); Minerva Fabienne Hase; Nikita Volodin	(Italy); Lucrezia Beccari; Matteo Guarise
Ice dance	(Italy); Charlène Guignard; Marco Fabbri	(United Kingdom); Lilah Fear; Lewis Gibson	(Lithuania); Allison Reed; Saulius Ambrulevičius

Small medals were awarded to the skaters or teams who achieved the highest free skate or free dance placements in each discipline.

Small medal recipients for highest free skate or free dance
Discipline	Gold	Silver	Bronze
Men	(France); Adam Siao Him Fa	(Italy); Matteo Rizzo	(Estonia); Aleksandr Selevko
Women	(Belgium); Loena Hendrickx	(Georgia (country)); Anastasiia Gubanova	(Belgium); Nina Pinzarrone
Pairs	(Italy); Lucrezia Beccari; Matteo Guarise	(Italy); Rebecca Ghilardi; Filippo Ambrosini	(Hungary); Maria Pavlova; Alexei Sviatchenko
Ice dance	(Italy); Charlène Guignard; Marco Fabbri	(United Kingdom); Lilah Fear; Lewis Gibson	(Lithuania); Allison Reed; Saulius Ambrulevičius

=== Medals by country ===
Rank	Nation	Gold	Silver	Bronze	Total
1	Italy	2	0	2	4
2	Belgium	1	0	1	2
3	France	1	0	0	1
4	Georgia	0	2	0	2
5	Estonia	0	1	0	1
5	Great Britain	0	1	0	1
7	Lithuania	0	0	1	1
Totals (7 entries)		4	4	4	12

== Results ==
=== Men's singles ===
Men's results
Rank	Skater	Nation	Total	SP		FS	
1st place, gold medalist(s)	Adam Siao Him Fa	France	276.17	1	94.13	1	182.04
2nd place, silver medalist(s)	Aleksandr Selevko	Estonia	256.99	3	90.05	3	166.94
3rd place, bronze medalist(s)	Matteo Rizzo	Italy	250.87	6	80.43	2	170.44
4	Gabriele Frangipani	Italy	246.09	4	83.51	4	162.58
5	Lukas Britschgi	Switzerland	242.46	2	91.17	10	151.29
6	Deniss Vasiļjevs	Latvia	237.42	5	82.34	7	155.08
7	Nika Egadze	Georgia	233.16	10	77.00	6	156.16
8	Vladimir Samoilov	Poland	230.17	16	71.05	5	159.12
9	Georgii Reshtenko	Czech Republic	226.67	13	72.74	8	153.93
10	Nikolaj Memola	Italy	225.88	12	72.78	9	153.10
11	Adam Hagara	Slovakia	220.82	11	74.97	11	145.85
12	Mark Gorodnitsky	Israel	217.56	9	77.50	13	140.06
13	Nikita Starostin	Germany	211.85	14	71.99	14	139.86
14	Ivan Shmuratko	Ukraine	210.65	19	69.95	12	140.70
15	Luc Economides	France	210.56	7	78.59	17	131.97
16	Vladimir Litvintsev	Azerbaijan	209.21	20	69.72	15	139.49
17	Maurizio Zandron	Austria	202.91	22	65.47	16	137.44
18	Tomàs-Llorenç Guarino Sabaté	Spain	202.60	15	71.93	18	130.67
19	Fedor Chitipakhovian	Armenia	197.44	21	68.51	19	128.93
20	Makar Suntsev	Finland	192.75	18	70.40	20	122.35
21	Gabriel Folkesson	Sweden	191.67	17	70.71	21	120.96
22	Andreas Nordebäck	Sweden	189.42	8	77.62	23	111.80
23	Aleksandr Vlasenko	Hungary	183.76	23	65.08	22	118.68
24	Davide Lewton Brain	Monaco	175.95	24	65.06	24	110.89
25	Edward Appleby	Great Britain	63.39	25	63.39	Did not advance to free skate	
26	Burak Demirboğa	Turkey	63.00	26	63.00	Did not advance to free skate	
27	Jari Kessler	Croatia	62.44	27	62.44	Did not advance to free skate	
28	Alexander Zlatkov	Bulgaria	61.94	28	61.94	Did not advance to free skate	
29	Fedir Kulish	Latvia	60.97	29	60.97	Did not advance to free skate	
30	Mihhail Selevko	Estonia	60.09	30	60.09	Did not advance to free skate	
31	Kévin Aymoz	France	57.33	31	57.33	Did not advance to free skate	
32	David Sedej	Slovenia	51.10	32	51.10	Did not advance to free skate	

=== Women's singles ===
Women's results
Rank	Skater	Nation	Total	SP		FS	
1st place, gold medalist(s)	Loena Hendrickx	Belgium	213.25	1	74.66	1	138.59
2nd place, silver medalist(s)	Anastasiia Gubanova	Georgia	206.52	3	68.96	2	137.56
3rd place, bronze medalist(s)	Nina Pinzarrone	Belgium	202.29	2	69.70	3	132.59
4	Livia Kaiser	Switzerland	194.72	4	66.31	4	128.41
5	Lorine Schild	France	183.86	6	63.27	6	120.59
6	Sarina Joos	Italy	180.83	9	59.82	5	121.01
7	Kimmy Repond	Switzerland	180.82	8	60.34	7	120.48
8	Olga Mikutina	Austria	173.46	5	63.71	10	109.75
9	Julia Sauter	Romania	168.40	10	58.59	9	109.81
10	Lara Naki Gutmann	Italy	166.01	16	55.68	8	110.33
11	Josefin Taljegård	Sweden	165.03	13	57.33	12	107.70
12	Emmi Peltonen	Finland	164.74	14	56.73	11	108.01
13	Sofja Stepčenko	Latvia	157.69	21	52.53	13	105.16
14	Nataly Langerbaur	Estonia	155.32	19	54.36	15	100.96
15	Kristina Isaev	Germany	155.28	20	53.61	14	101.67
16	Aleksandra Golovkina	Lithuania	155.16	15	55.80	16	99.36
17	Nina Povey	Great Britain	154.05	17	54.78	17	99.27
18	Alexandra Feigin	Bulgaria	153.04	12	57.33	19	95.71
19	Mariia Seniuk	Israel	152.95	18	54.53	18	98.42
20	Anastasia Gozhva	Ukraine	151.50	11	57.83	20	93.67
21	Nella Pelkonen	Finland	150.01	7	62.60	23	87.41
22	Alina Urushadze	Georgia	140.66	23	50.54	21	90.12
23	Jade Hovine	Belgium	140.38	22	51.32	22	89.06
24	Barbora Vránková	Czech Republic	116.90	24	50.08	24	66.82
25	Ekaterina Kurakova	Poland	49.57	25	49.57	Did not advance to free skate	
26	Mia Risa Gomez	Norway	48.65	26	48.65	Did not advance to free skate	
27	Kristina Lisovskaja	Estonia	47.94	27	47.94	Did not advance to free skate	
28	Regina Schermann	Hungary	45.50	28	45.50	Did not advance to free skate	
29	Vanesa Šelmeková	Slovakia	44.24	29	44.24	Did not advance to free skate	
30	Julija Lovrenčič	Slovenia	41.52	30	41.52	Did not advance to free skate	
31	Antonina Dubinina	Serbia	41.28	31	41.28	Did not advance to free skate	
32	Laura Szczęsna	Poland	40.03	32	40.03	Did not advance to free skate	
33	Ana Sofia Beşchea	Romania	37.52	33	37.52	Did not advance to free skate	

=== Pairs ===
Pairs' results
Rank	Team	Nation	Total	SP		FS	
1st place, gold medalist(s)	Lucrezia Beccari; Matteo Guarise	Italy	199.19	3	67.05	1	132.14
2nd place, silver medalist(s)	Anastasiia Metelkina; Luka Berulava	Georgia	196.14	1	71.30	5	124.84
3rd place, bronze medalist(s)	Rebecca Ghilardi; Filippo Ambrosini	Italy	195.68	5	64.87	2	130.81
4	Maria Pavlova; Alexei Sviatchenko	Hungary	194.02	4	65.29	3	128.73
5	Minerva Fabienne Hase; Nikita Volodin	Germany	190.69	2	69.63	6	121.06
6	Sara Conti; Niccolò Macii	Italy	187.25	7	61.52	4	125.73
7	Annika Hocke; Robert Kunkel	Germany	177.75	6	62.52	7	115.23
8	Daria Danilova; Michel Tsiba	Netherlands	167.32	10	53.95	8	113.37
9	Anastasia Vaipan-Law; Luke Digby	Great Britain	159.01	8	56.79	9	102.22
10	Ioulia Chtchetinina; Michał Woźniak	Poland	154.91	11	53.61	11	101.30
11	Sofiia Holichenko; Artem Darenskyi	Ukraine	154.37	12	52.95	10	101.42
12	Océane Piegad; Denys Strekalin	France	148.51	9	54.06	12	94.45
13	Barbora Kucianová; Martin Bidař	Czech Republic	144.63	13	52.49	14	92.14
14	Milania Väänänen; Filippo Clerici	Finland	142.27	16	48.23	13	94.04
15	Lydia Smart; Harry Mattick	Great Britain	140.46	14	51.60	15	88.86
WD	Camille Kovalev; Pavel Kovalev	France	Withdrew	15	50.90	Withdrew from competition	
17	Greta Crafoord; John Crafoord	Sweden	42.66	17	42.66	Did not advance to free skate	
18	Sophia Schaller; Livio Mayr	Austria	42.57	18	42.57	Did not advance to free skate	

=== Ice dance ===
Ice dance results
Rank	Team	Nation	Total	RD		FD	
1st place, gold medalist(s)	Charlène Guignard; Marco Fabbri	Italy	214.38	1	86.80	1	128.58
2nd place, silver medalist(s)	Lilah Fear; Lewis Gibson	Great Britain	210.82	2	85.20	2	125.62
3rd place, bronze medalist(s)	Allison Reed; Saulius Ambrulevičius	Lithuania	203.37	3	80.73	3	122.64
4	Evgenia Lopareva; Geoffrey Brissaud	France	197.17	4	78.47	4	118.70
5	Loïcia Demougeot; Théo le Mercier	France	192.15	8	75.69	5	116.46
6	Juulia Turkkila; Matthias Versluis	Finland	192.08	6	76.36	6	115.72
7	Natálie Taschlerová; Filip Taschler	Czech Republic	191.55	5	76.68	7	114.87
8	Diana Davis; Gleb Smolkin	Georgia	189.46	7	76.33	8	113.13
9	Kateřina Mrázková; Daniel Mrázek	Czech Republic	182.33	9	75.19	11	107.14
10	Yuka Orihara; Juho Pirinen	Finland	179.71	10	68.59	9	111.12
11	Jennifer Janse van Rensburg; Benjamin Steffan	Germany	178.78	11	68.37	10	110.41
12	Marie Dupayage; Thomas Nabais	France	170.98	13	65.15	12	105.83
13	Carolane Soucisse; Shane Firus	Ireland	168.19	12	66.69	13	101.50
14	Mariia Holubtsova; Kyryl Bielobrov	Ukraine	163.64	14	62.40	14	101.24
15	Victoria Manni; Carlo Röthlisberger	Italy	163.09	15	62.26	15	100.83
16	Paulina Ramanauskaitė; Deividas Kizala	Lithuania	154.85	20	60.76	16	94.09
17	Phebe Bekker; James Hernandez	Great Britain	154.75	19	61.19	17	93.56
18	Mariia Pinchuk; Mykyta Pogorielov	Ukraine	153.58	17	61.42	18	92.16
19	Maria Nosovitskaya; Mikhail Nosovitskiy	Israel	147.67	16	61.72	19	85.95
20	Solène Mazingue; Marko Jevgeni Gaidajenko	Estonia	144.74	18	61.38	20	83.36
21	Charise Matthaei; Max Liebers	Germany	59.74	21	59.74	Did not advance to free dance	
22	Leia Dozzi; Pietro Papetti	Italy	58.71	22	58.71	Did not advance to free dance	
23	Sofía Val; Asaf Kazimov	Spain	58.04	23	58.04	Did not advance to free dance	
24	Maria Sofia Pucherová; Nikita Lysak	Slovakia	56.09	24	56.09	Did not advance to free dance	
25	Mariia Ignateva; Danijil Szemko	Hungary	55.04	25	55.04	Did not advance to free dance	
26	Sofiia Dovhal; Wiktor Kulesza	Poland	54.96	26	54.96	Did not advance to free dance	
27	Milla Ruud Reitan; Nikolaj Majorov	Sweden	54.89	27	54.89	Did not advance to free dance	
28	Layla Karnes; Liam Carr	Great Britain	54.10	28	54.10	Did not advance to free dance	
29	Hanna Jakucs; Alessio Galli	Netherlands	53.51	29	53.51	Did not advance to free dance	
30	Lucy Hancock; Ilias Fourati	Hungary	53.47	30	53.47	Did not advance to free dance	
31	Arianna Sassi; Luca Morini	Switzerland	53.06	31	53.06	Did not advance to free dance	
32	Adrienne Carhart; Oleksandr Kolosovskyi	Azerbaijan	49.53	32	49.53	Did not advance to free dance	
33	Olivia Shilling; Léo Baeten	Belgium	47.51	33	47.51	Did not advance to free dance	
