= Zsolt Kerekes =

Hungarian figure skater and coach

Personal information
- Born: 1973 (age 52–53)

Figure skating career
- Country: Hungary
- Coach: László Vajda; Czako; Cornel Munteanu; Mária Bogyó-Löffler
- Skating club: Budapesti Korcsolyázó Egylet
- Began skating: 1977
- Retired: 1995

Zsolt Kerekes (born 1973) is a Hungarian figure skating coach and former competitor. He is the 1994 Ondrej Nepela Memorial champion, a two-time Karl Schäfer Memorial silver medalist, and a two-time Hungarian national champion.

== Career ==
On the ice from the age of five, Kerekes was coached by Mária Bogyó-Löffler from 1977 to 1984 and then by Cornel Munteanu through 1992. He was a member of Budapesti Korcsolyázó Egylet (Budapest Skating Club).

Kerekes was coached by the Czakos in the 1993–94 season. After obtaining silver medals at the 1993 Karl Schäfer Memorial and Ondrej Nepela Memorial, he won his first senior national title and was named in Hungary's team to the 1994 European Championships. He placed 6th in qualifying group A, 8th in the short program, 16th in the free skate, and 13th overall at the event in Copenhagen, Denmark. At his next major assignment, the 1994 World Championships in Chiba, Japan, he finished 10th in qualifying group B, 17th in the short program, 15th in the free skate, and 16th overall.

László Vajda was his coach in the 1994–95 season. Kerekes placed 6th at the 1994 Skate Canada International and 5th at the 1994 Trophée de France. He won silver at the 1994 Karl Schäfer Memorial, gold at the Ondrej Nepela Memorial, and gold at the Hungarian Championships. He concluded his competitive career in March 1995 at the World Championships in Birmingham, England; ranked 9th in the short and 11th in the free, he finished 10th overall.

After retiring from competition, Kerekes performed in ice shows and became a coach. He coached Manouk Gijsman, a three-time Dutch champion, in Zoetermeer, Netherlands; and Zahra Lari, the first skater to represent the United Arab Emirates in an International Skating Union competition, at the Zayed Sports City ice rink in Abu Dhabi.

== Competitive highlights ==
International
Event	1988–89	1989–90	1990–91	1991–92	1992–93	1993–94	1994–95
World Championships						16th	10th
European Championships						13th	
Skate Canada							6th
Trophée de France							5th
Karl Schäfer Memorial						2nd	2nd
Ondrej Nepela Memorial						2nd	1st
National
Romanian Championships	2nd		3rd		2nd		
Hungarian Championships						1st	1st
