= Cornel Gheorghe =

Romanian figure skater and coach

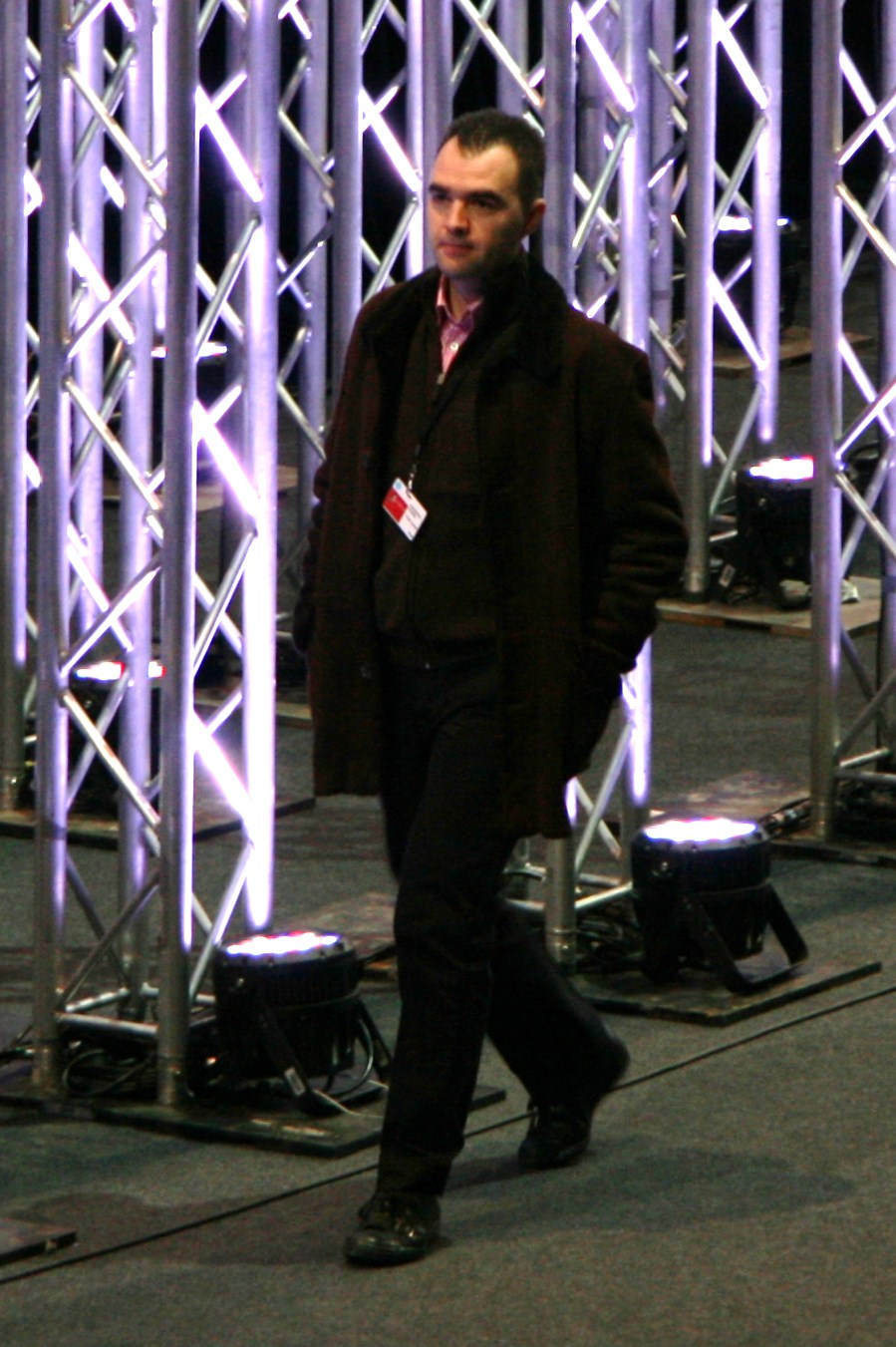

Personal information
- Born: 21 March 1971 (age 55) Galaţi, Romania
- Height: 1.77 m (5 ft 9 1/2 in)

Figure skating career
- Country: Romania
- Began skating: 1976
- Retired: 2000

Medal record
Romanian Championships
Gold medal – first place	1987 Miercurea Ciuc	Singles
Gold medal – first place	1988 Gheorgheni	Singles
Gold medal – first place	1989 Galați	Singles
Gold medal – first place	1990 Bucharest	Singles
Gold medal – first place	1991 Bucharest	Singles
Gold medal – first place	1993 Bucharest	Singles
Gold medal – first place	1994 Miercurea Ciuc	Singles
Gold medal – first place	1995 Bucharest	Singles
Gold medal – first place	1996 Bucharest	Singles
Gold medal – first place	1997 Miercurea Ciuc	Singles
Gold medal – first place	1998 Bucharest	Singles
Silver medal – second place	1992 Bucharest	Singles
Silver medal – second place	1999 Bucharest	Singles
Silver medal – second place	2000 Bucharest	Singles
Bronze medal – third place	1986 Bucharest	Singles

Cornel Gheorghe (born 21 March 1971) is a Romanian figure skating coach and former competitor. He competed at the 1994 Winter Olympics, where he placed 14th, and at the 1998 Winter Olympics, where he placed 21st. He was an eleven-time Romanian national champion.

Gheorghe retired from competition in 2000 and turned to coaching. He coached Adrian Matei and Zolt Kosz, among others. He is also a technical specialist for Romania.

== Programs ==
Season	Short program	Free skating
1999–2000		Piano Concerto in F by George Gershwin

== Results ==
GP: Champions Series (Grand Prix)

Event	85–86	86–87	87–88	88–89	89–90	90–91	91–92	92–93	93–94	94–95	95–96	96–97	97–98	98–99	99–00
Winter Olympics									14th				21st		
World Championships					26th	23rd	11th	9th		14th	14th	14th		28th	28th
European Championships			22nd		12th	14th		24th	12th	10th	9th	16th	18th		
Romanian Championships	3rd	1st	1st	1st	1st	1st	2nd	1st	1st	1st	1st	1st	1st	2nd	2nd
GP Skate America												8th			
GP Skate Canada											9th	10th	6th		
GP Trophée de France								9th		8th	5th				
GP Cup of Russia													9th		
Skate Canada								5th							
Skate Israel														11th	
Crystal Skate of Romania															3rd
Winter Universiade												2nd		4th	
World Junior Championships	15th	17th		WD											
