= Irina Timcic =

Romanian figure skater

Personal information
- Nationality: Romanian
- Born: 4 September 1910; Chernivtsi, Austria-Hungary
- Died: unknown

Sport
- Sport: Figure skating

Irina Timcic (born 4 September 1910, date of death unknown) was a Romanian figure skater. She competed in the European Figure Skating Championships and the Winter Olympic Games. At the 1934 European Figure Skating Championships, she and her partner Alfred Eisenbeisser finished seventh in the mixed pair events.

Again with Eisenbeisser, she took part at the 1936 Winter Olympics, finishing 13th in the pairs event.
