= Valea Neagră =

Valea Neagră may refer to several places:

- Valea Neagră, a village attached to the city of Baia Mare, Maramureș County, Romania
- Valea Neagră, a village in Nistorești Commune, Vrancea County, Romania
- Valea Neagră was the name of Lumina, Constanța County, Romania, from 1929 until 1965
- Valea Neagră, a tributary of the Brătei in Dâmbovița County, Romania
- Valea Neagră, a tributary of the Cheia in Vâlcea County, Romania
- Valea Neagră (Crasna), in Satu Mare County, Romania and Szabolcs-Szatmár-Bereg County, Hungary
- Valea Neagră (Crișul Negru), in Bihor County, Romania
- Valea Neagră, a tributary of the Doftana in Prahova County, Romania
- Valea Neagră, a tributary of the Firiza in Maramureș County, Romania
- Valea Neagră, a tributary of the Lotrioara in Sibiu County, Romania
- Valea Neagră, a tributary of the Năruja in Vrancea County, Romania
- Valea Neagră, a tributary of the Olt in Sibiu County, Romania
- Valea Neagră, a tributary of the Olt in Brașov County, Romania
- Valea Neagră, a tributary of the Râmna in Vrancea County, Romania
- Valea Neagră, a tributary of the Santău in Satu Mare County, Romania
- Valea Neagră (Siret), a tributary of the Siret in Neamț County, Romania
- Valea Neagră, a tributary of the Teleajen in Prahova County, Romania

== See also ==
- Neagra (disambiguation)
