= Negrea (beetle) =

Scientific classification
- Domain: Eukaryota
- Kingdom: Animalia
- Phylum: Arthropoda
- Class: Insecta
- Order: Coleoptera
- Suborder: Adephaga
- Family: Carabidae
- Subfamily: Lebiinae
- Tribe: Lebiini
- Subtribe: Dromiusina
- Genus: Negrea; Mateu, 1968

Synonyms
- Reichardtia Mateu, 1982; Reichardtina Mateu, 1985

Genus of beetles

Negrea is a genus of beetles in the family Carabidae, found in Mexico, Central America, and South America.

== Species ==
These 11 species belong to the genus Negrea:

- Negrea aldretei Mateu, 1982 (Mexico)
- Negrea brasiliensis Mateu & Comas, 2008 (Brazil)
- Negrea chiapanensis Mateu, 1975 (Mexico)
- Negrea freyi Mateu, 1972 (Argentina, Paraguay, and Brazil)
- Negrea immaculata Mateu, 1975 (Brazil)
- Negrea mexicana Mateu, 1975 (Mexico)
- Negrea opaca Mateu, 1982 (Venezuela and Brazil)
- Negrea peruviana Mateu, 1982 (Peru)
- Negrea scutellaris (Dejean, 1834) (Bolivia, Colombia, and Brazil)
- Negrea sinopiana Mateu & Comas, 2008 (Brazil)
- Negrea striatella Mateu, 1982 (Brazil)
