= Roxana Hartmann =

Romanian figure skater

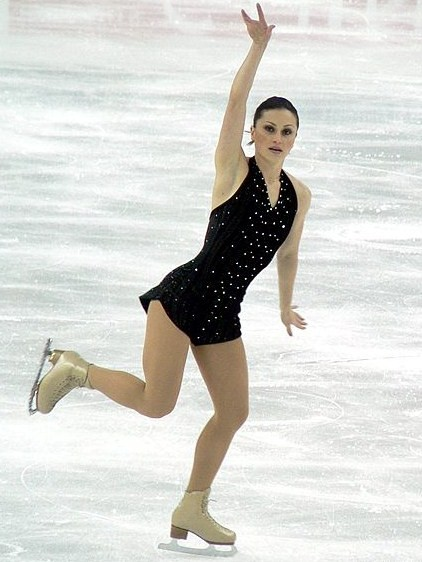
- Luca at the 2005 European Championships

Personal information
- Other names: Roxana Luca
- Born: 23 December 1982 (age 43) Bucharest, Romania
- Height: 1.65 m (5 ft 5 in)

Figure skating career
- Country: Romania
- Skating club: C.S. Forex Brasov
- Began skating: 1987
- Retired: 2009

Roxana Hartmann, née Luca (born 23 December 1982) is a Romanian former competitive figure skater. She is a ten-time Romanian national champion and represented her country at two Olympics. She qualified for the free skate at the 2002 Winter Olympics in Salt Lake City, four European Championships, and two World Junior Championships. Her best ISU Championship result was 15th, which she achieved at the 2002 Junior Worlds and 2005 Europeans.

== Career ==
Hartmann made her senior international debut when she was 13 years old, placing 14th in her qualifying group at the 1996 European Championships. She competed on both the junior and senior levels until the end of the 2001–02 season. Her best result in five appearances at the World Junior Championships was 15th in 2002.

Hartmann placed 23rd at the 2002 Winter Olympics in Salt Lake City, Utah, United States. She underwent knee surgery in September 2003 and missed the 2003–04 season as a result.

Hartmann finished a career-best 15th at the 2005 European Championships. A back injury caused her to withdraw from the 2006 European Championships during the short program. She placed 26th at her second Olympics, in Turin.

Hartmann last competed at the 2009 World Championships.

Since her retirement, she began working as a figure skating coach and choreographer in southern Germany.

== Programs ==
Season	Short program	Free skating
2009–2010	Dancing with Music	Amélie by Yann Tiersen
2007–2009	Blues Boys Tune by B. B. King	Amélie by Yann Tiersen
2006–2007	Dance and Doo Doo Stains	My Fair Lady by Frederick Loewe
2005–2006	Malagueña by Ernesto Lecuona	My Fair Lady by Frederick Loewe
2004–2005	Malagueña by Ernesto Lecuona	The Screen Behind the Mirror by Michael Cretu, Enigma
2003–2004	Malagueña by Ernesto Lecuona	Angela's Ashes by John Williams; Chocolat by Rachel Portman
2002–2003	The Mexican performed by Vanessa-Mae	Angela's Ashes by John Williams; Chocolat by Rachel Portman
2000–2002	Ballad for Two Strangers by Ioan Gyuri Pascu	The Screen Behind the Mirror by Michael Cretu, Enigma

== Competitive highlights ==
GP: Grand Prix; JGP: Junior Series/Junior Grand Prix

International
Event	95–96	96–97	97–98	98–99	99–00	00–01	01–02	02–03	04–05	05–06	06–07	07–08	08–09
Olympics							23rd			26th			
Worlds			38th		26th	27th	33rd	37th	28th	32nd	30th	39th	36th
Europeans	36th				30th	26th	21st	30th	15th	WD	21st	22nd	27th
GP Cup of China											12th		
Crystal Skate					1st	1st	1st			5th		3rd	7th
Cup of Nice												6th	
Finlandia Trophy											10th		
Golden Spin						17th	13th		13th			15th	
Merano Cup												3rd	
Nebelhorn Trophy					18th	13th		WD		14th			
Nepela Memorial										12th			WD
Schäfer Memorial				WD			8th		15th	6th			11th
Universiade											13th		
Montfort Cup									1st				
International: Junior
Junior Worlds		20th Q		41st	39th	22nd	15th						
JGP Czech Rep.						8th	4th						
JGP Germany						13th							
JGP Hungary			25th										
JGP Slovakia				22nd									
JGP Slovenia					20th								
EYOF					11th								
Golden Bear					8th								
Triglav Trophy						9th							
National
Romanian Champ.	1st	2nd	3rd	1st	1st	1st	1st		1st	1st	1st	1st	1st
Luca did not compete in the 2003–04 season.
