= Gheorghe Chiper =

Romanian figure skater

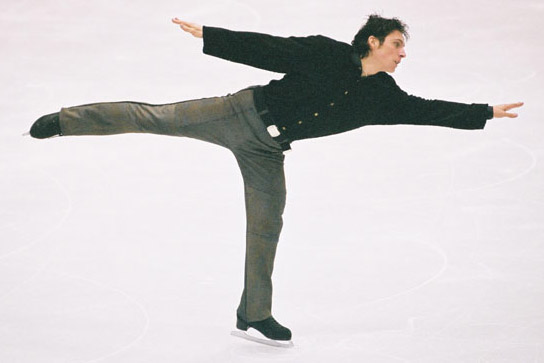
- Chiper at the 2002 Winter Olympics

Personal information
- Born: 8 April 1978 (age 48) Miercurea Ciuc, Romania
- Height: 1.76 m (5 ft 9 in)

Figure skating career
- Country: Romania
- Skating club: SC Miercurea Ciuc
- Began skating: 1983
- Retired: 2006

Gheorghe Chiper (born 8 April 1978) is a Romanian former competitive figure skater. He is a seven-time Romanian national champion and competed at two Olympic Games. He is the first Romanian skater to win a medal on the Grand Prix circuit and the first Romanian to land a quadruple toe loop in competition.

== Figure skating career ==
=== Competitive career ===
Chiper competed at three World Junior Championships; his best result was 15th in 1997.

Chiper made his senior World Championships debut in 1998, finishing 16th in the qualifying round. The following season, Chiper won his first senior national title.

In the 2000–01 season, he was coached by Sylvia Holtes in Groningen, Netherlands. In 2001–02, Sandra Schär became his coach in Küsnacht, Switzerland. Chiper competed at his first Olympics in 2002, placing 23rd.

At the 2005 European Championships, Chiper achieved his best European result, 8th.

In winning bronze at the 2005 Trophee Eric Bompard, Chiper became the first Romanian to ever medal on the Grand Prix series. He placed 14th at his second Olympics in Turin, Italy. He competed for the final time at the 2006 World Championships where he also placed 14th, his career-best Worlds result.

Since his competitive retirement, he has worked as a coach in Switzerland.

=== Coaching career ===
Chiper has worked as a figure skating coach in Zurich Switzerland since 2001. In 2009 he co-founded Skate Academy Switzerland GmbH where he works as head-coach overseeing a team of assistant coaches, conditioning staff and choreographers.

Chiper's figure skating students have achieved numerous national titles and competed in international competitions. Chiper has coached his teammembers to qualify and compete at Junior Grand Prix, Junior World Championships, European Youth Olympic Festivals, Youth Olympic Games, European and World Championships, Grand Prix and Olympic Games 2014 and 2022. Former and current students include Myriam Leuenberger, Moris Pfeiffhofer, Tina Stürzinger, Zoltan Kelemen, Tanja Odermatt, Leon Auspurg, Eveline Brunner, Alexia Paganini, Georgii Pavlov, and Sarina Joos.

In October 2022 Chiper was nominated for the Swiss Olympic Coach Award.

== Personal life ==
Chiper was born on 8 April 1978 in Miercurea Ciuc, Romania. He speaks Romanian, Hungarian, English, Dutch, Italian, French and German. He is of part-Hungarian descent.

== Programs ==
Season	Short program	Free skating
2005–06	Groove Collection by Brigade Mondaine; Marrocon (modern Gypsy collection) choreo. by Sandra Schär	Balkan gypsy music choreo. by Sandra Schär, Pasquale Camerlengo
2004–05	Groove Collection by Brigade Mondaine	Balkan gypsy music choreo. by Sandra Schär, Pasquale Camerlengo
2003–04	Spirit of Morocco	The Groove Maker by Michel Besson; Triangle; Saint Luce by Lydie Auvray
2002–03	Tango (from The Monster) by Evan Lurie	The Groove Maker by Michel Besson; Triangle; Saint Luce by Lydie Auvray
2001–02	El Mostro (Tango) by Evan Lurie	Léon: The Professional by Éric Serra
2000–01	American Beauty by Thomas Newman	Black Cat, White Cat performed by Goran Bregović

== Competitive highlights ==
=== Men's singles ===
Competition	1994–95	1995–96	1996–97	1997–98	1998–99	1999–2000	2000–01	2001–02	2002–03	2003–04	2004–05	2005–06
Winter Olympics								23rd				14th
World Championships				31st			21st		18th	17th	18th	14th
European Championships					20th	29th	15th	18th	9th	9th	8th	9th
Romanian Championships	3rd	4th	3rd	2nd	1st	1st	1st	1st	1st		1st	1st
GP Cup of Russia								7th				
GP NHK Trophy										7th		
GP Skate Canada											12th	
GP Trophée Éric Bompard											5th	3rd
Crystal Skate of Romania							2nd	1st	1st	1st	1st	1st
Finlandia Trophy							12th	3rd	2nd	1st		
Golden Spin of Zagreb				10th	7th	8th	6th		1st			
Karl Schäfer Memorial							4th	6th				
Nebelhorn Trophy				11th	17th		9th					
Ondrej Nepela Trophy					11th							
Winter Universiade			14th									
World Junior Championships	27th	23rd	15th									

=== Pair skating (with Cristina Fekete) ===
Competition	1990–91	1991–92	1992–93
Romanian Championships	3rd	2nd	2nd
