= Zoltán Kelemen (figure skater) =

Romanian figure skater (born 1986)

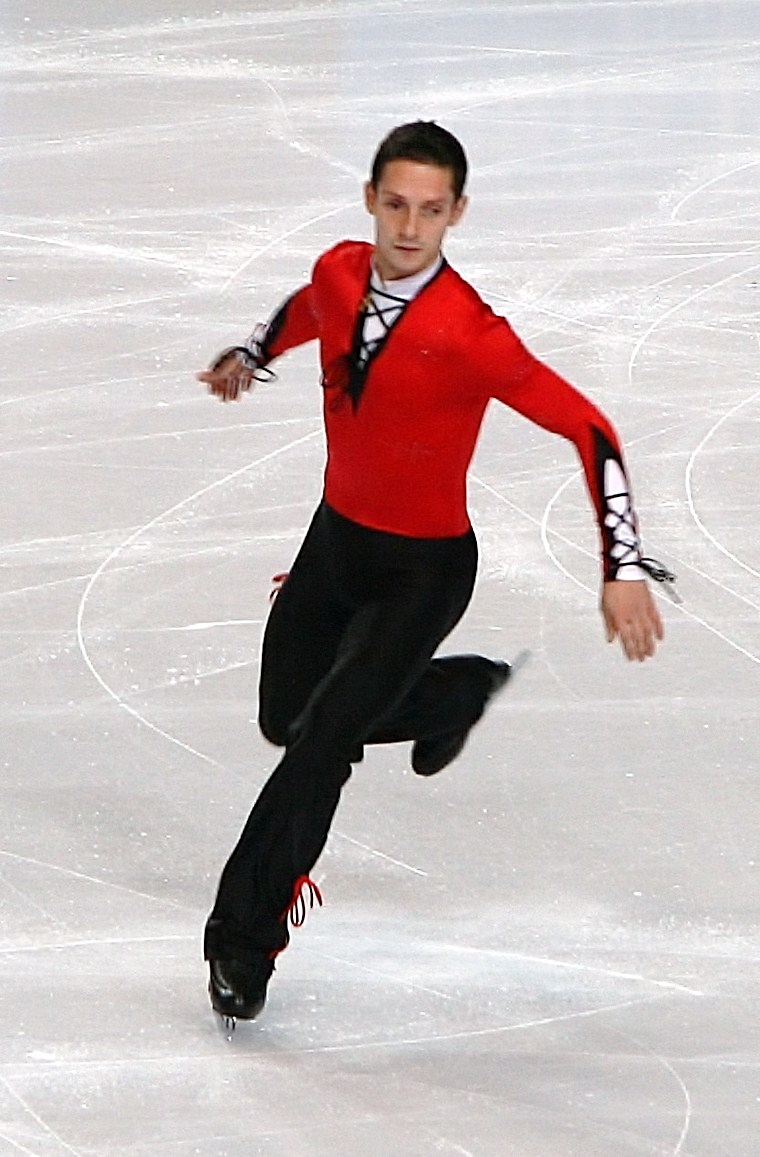
- Kelemen in 2010.

Personal information
- Born: 31 July 1986 (age 40) Miercurea Ciuc, Romania
- Height: 1.64 m (5 ft 5 in)

Figure skating career
- Country: Romania
- Coach: Gheorghe Chiper, Linda van Troyen
- Skating club: SC Miercurea Ciuc
- Began skating: 1991

Zoltán Kelemen (born 31 July 1986) is a Romanian former competitive figure skater. He is an eight-time Romanian national champion. He qualified for the free skate at the 2014 Winter Olympics, the 2014 World Championships, five European Championships, and two World Junior Championships.

== Personal life ==
Kelemen was born on 31 July 1986 in Miercurea Ciuc, Romania. He is of Hungarian descent. He lost the sight in his right eye at age seven, following an accident involving an exploding aerosol can.

== Career ==
Due to his vision impairment, Kelemen failed the yearly physical Romania requires of its athletes to get permission to compete. He was required to sign an annual waiver declaring that he was competing "on his own responsibility."

In the 2004–05 and 2005–06 season, Kelemen competed on the ISU Junior Grand Prix series and at the World Junior Championships. In 2007, he won his first senior national title and was given his debut at the European Championships and senior World Championships.

At the 2009 Nebelhorn Trophy, Kelemen earned a spot for Romania in the Olympic men's event. He began training in California and qualified for the free skate for the first time in his career at the 2010 European Championships. He then competed at the 2010 Olympics, placing 29th.

Kelemen placed a career-best 14th at the 2012 European Championships. In August 2012, he decided to train in Switzerland with Gheorghe Chiper; he also works in Switzerland as he receives little support from the Romanian skating association. Kelemen earned another Olympic berth for Romania at the 2013 Nebelhorn Trophy. At the 2014 Winter Olympics, he qualified for the free skate and finished 23rd.

== Programs ==
| Season | Short program | Free skating |
|---|---|---|
| 2013–14 | Rich Man's Frug (from Sweet Charity) | Breathe and Life; Akkadian Empire; Guardians at the Gate by Audio Machine |
| 2012–13 | Rich Man's Frug (from Sweet Charity) | Italian medley |
| 2011–12 | Dralion (from Cirque du Soleil) | Pearl Harbor by Hans Zimmer |
| 2010–11 | Dralion (from Cirque du Soleil) | Mumbai Theme |
| 2008–10 | Amélie by Yann Tiersen; Ballade by Emilie Lassaria | Pirates of the Caribbean by Klaus Badelt, Hans Zimmer |
| 2006–08 | Played-A-Life by Safri Duo | The Man in the Iron Mask by Nick Glennie Smith |
| 2004–06 | Austin Powers by George S. Clinton | Sequences from Holiday on Ice Show |

== Results ==
GP: Grand Prix; JGP: Junior Grand Prix

| Competition | 2002–03 | 2003–04 | 2004–05 | 2005–06 | 2006–07 | 2007–08 | 2008–09 | 2009–10 | 2010–11 | 2011–12 | 2012–13 | 2013–14 |
|---|---|---|---|---|---|---|---|---|---|---|---|---|
| Winter Olympics | | | | | | | | 29th | | | | 23rd |
| World Championships | | | | | 41st | 33rd | 32nd | 32nd | | 32nd | 29th | 21st |
| European Championships | | | | | 32nd | 35th | 34th | 19th | 21st | 14th | 18th | 21st |
| Romanian Championships | 2nd | 2nd | 2nd | 3rd | 1st | 1st | 1st | 1st | 1st | 1st | 1st | 1st |
| GP Trophée Éric Bompard | | | | | | | | | 9th | | | |
| Bavarian Open | | | | | | | | | | | 12th | |
| Coupe du Printemps | | | | | | | | | | 2nd | 3rd | |
| Crystal Skate of Romania | 6th | 7th | 4th | 9th | | 6th | | | 2nd | 3rd | 2nd | 1st |
| Cup of Nice | | | | | | 12th | | | 12th | | 10th | |
| Golden Spin of Zagreb | | | 15th | 22nd | 16th | 16th | | | WD | | | |
| Karl Schäfer Memorial | | | | | | | 10th | | | | | |
| Merano Cup | | | | | | | | 9th | 2nd | | | |
| Nebelhorn Trophy | | | | | | 14th | | 13th | | | 20th | 6th |
| NRW Trophy | | | | | | | | | 15th | | | |
| Ondrej Nepela Trophy | | | | | | | | | | | 7th | |
| Slovenia Open | | | | | | | | | | | | 3rd |
| World Junior Championships | | | 19th | 17th | | | | | | | | |
| JGP Bulgaria | | | | 18th | | | | | | | | |
| JGP Croatia | | | | 19th | | | | | | | | |
| JGP Hungary | | | 18th | | | | | | | | | |
| Montfort Cup | | | 3rd | | | | | | | | | |
