= Neagra =

Neagra may refer to the following places in Romania:

- Neagra, a village in Dezna Commune, Arad County
- Neagra, a village in Lunca Bradului Commune, Mureș County
- Neagra, a village in Tașca Commune, Neamţ County
- Neagra, a village in the town of Broșteni, Suceava County
- Neagra, the former name of Poiana Vadului Commune, Alba County
- Neagra (Arieș), a tributary of the Arieșul Mare in Alba County
- Neagra, a tributary of the Bâsca Mică in Buzău County
- Neagra, a tributary of the Bicaz in Neamț County
- Neagra (Bistrița), a tributary of the Bistrița in Suceava County
- Neagra Broștenilor, a tributary of the Bistrița in Harghita and Suceava Counties
- Neagra, a tributary of the Mureș in Mureș County

== See also ==
- Apa Neagră (disambiguation)
- Valea Neagră (disambiguation)
