= Victoria Manni =

Italian-Swiss ice dancer (born 1994)

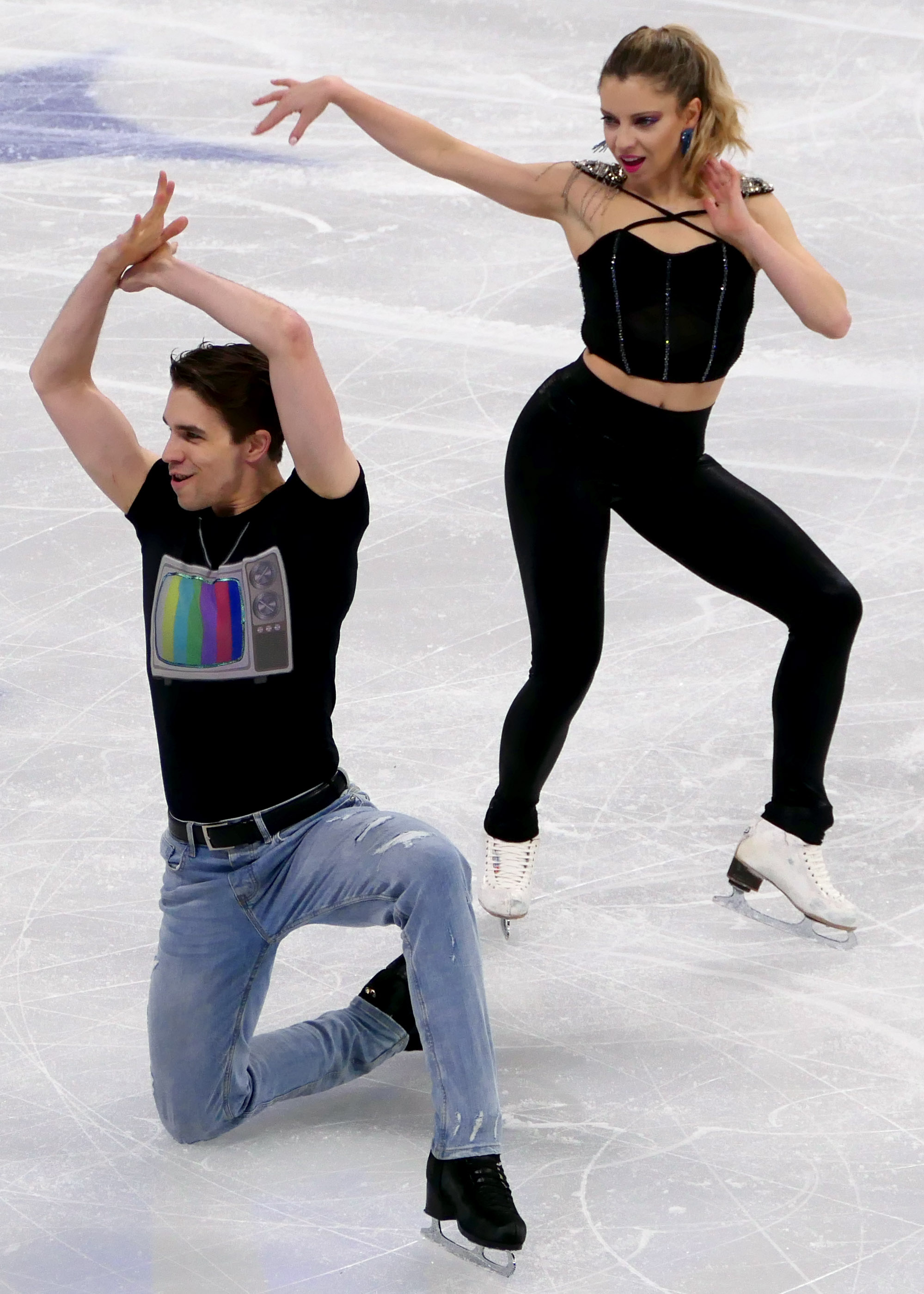
- Manni and Röthlisberger at the 2024 World Championships

Personal information
- Born: 23 August 1994 (age 32) Milan, Italy
- Height: 1.61 m (5 ft 3 1/2 in)

Figure skating career
- Country: Italy (since 2021); Switzerland (2016–20)
- Discipline: Ice dance
- Partner: Carlo Röthlisberger
- Coach: Barbara Fusar Poli; Charlie White
- Skating club: Zürich-Oerlikon
- Began skating: 1998

Medal record
Representing Italy
Italian Championships
Silver medal – second place	2023 Brunico	Ice dance
Silver medal – second place	2024 Pinerolo	Ice dance
Silver medal – second place	2025 Varese	Ice dance
Silver medal – second place	2026 Begamo	Ice dance
Representing Switzerland
Swiss Championships
Gold medal – first place	2017 Lucerne	Ice dance
Gold medal – first place	2018 Neuchâtel	Ice dance
Gold medal – first place	2019 Wetzikon	Ice dance
Gold medal – first place	2020 Biel/Bienne	Ice dance

Victoria Manni (born 23 August 1994) is an Italian ice dancer who previously competed for Switzerland. With her skating partner and husband, Carlo Röthlisberger, she is a four-time Italian national silver medalist (2023–26), the 2016 Santa Claus Cup bronze medalist, four-time Swiss national champion. As a team, they have competed in twelve ISU Championships.

== Personal life ==
Victoria Manni was born on 23 August 1994 in Milan, Italy. She is the daughter of Italian skating coach Franca Bianconi. Manni studied law at the Università Cattolica del Sacro Cuore, graduating in 2021.

She has been in a relationship with her ice dance partner, Carlo Röthlisberger, since 2015. The couple announced their engagement in July 2023 and married in May 2025.

== Career ==
=== Early years ===
Manni began learning to skate in 1998. Early in her career, she represented Italy in ladies' singles, coached by Franca Bianconi and Karel Fajfr. From 2010 to 2012, she competed at three ISU Junior Grand Prix events.

Manni's first ice dancing partner was Andrea Fabbri. In 2014, she teamed up with Benjamin Naggiar to compete for Italy in senior ice dancing. The two placed tenth at the 2014 International Cup of Nice in October and seventh at the Italian Championships a couple of months later. They were coached by Valter Rizzo and Brunilde Bianchi in Sesto San Giovanni.

During the 2015–16 season, Manni represented Italy with Saverio Giacomelli. The two appeared at four internationals, including two ISU Challenger Series events.

=== 2016–2017 season: Debut of Manni/Röthlisberger for Switzerland ===
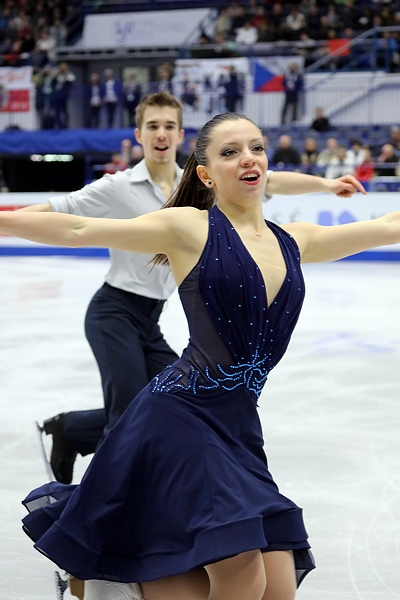
Manni/Röthlisberger at the 2017 European Championships

In 2016, Manni teamed up with Swiss ice dancer Carlo Röthlisberger to compete for Switzerland. They decided to train in Milan, coached by Roberto Pelizzola. Making their international debut, the duo placed fourteenth at the 2016 CS Tallinn Trophy in November. They would then go on to win the bronze medal at the 2016 Santa Claus Cup as well as finish ninth at the 2016 CS Golden Spin of Zagreb.

In December, Manni/Röthlisberger won their first national title at the 2016–17 Swiss Championships. They would then finish ninth at the 2017 Mentor Toruń Cup.

Selected to compete at the 2017 European Championships in Ostrava, Czech Republic, the duo finished in twenty-fifth place. They then concluded the season with a fourteenth-place finish at the 2017 Bavarian Open.

=== 2017–2018 season ===
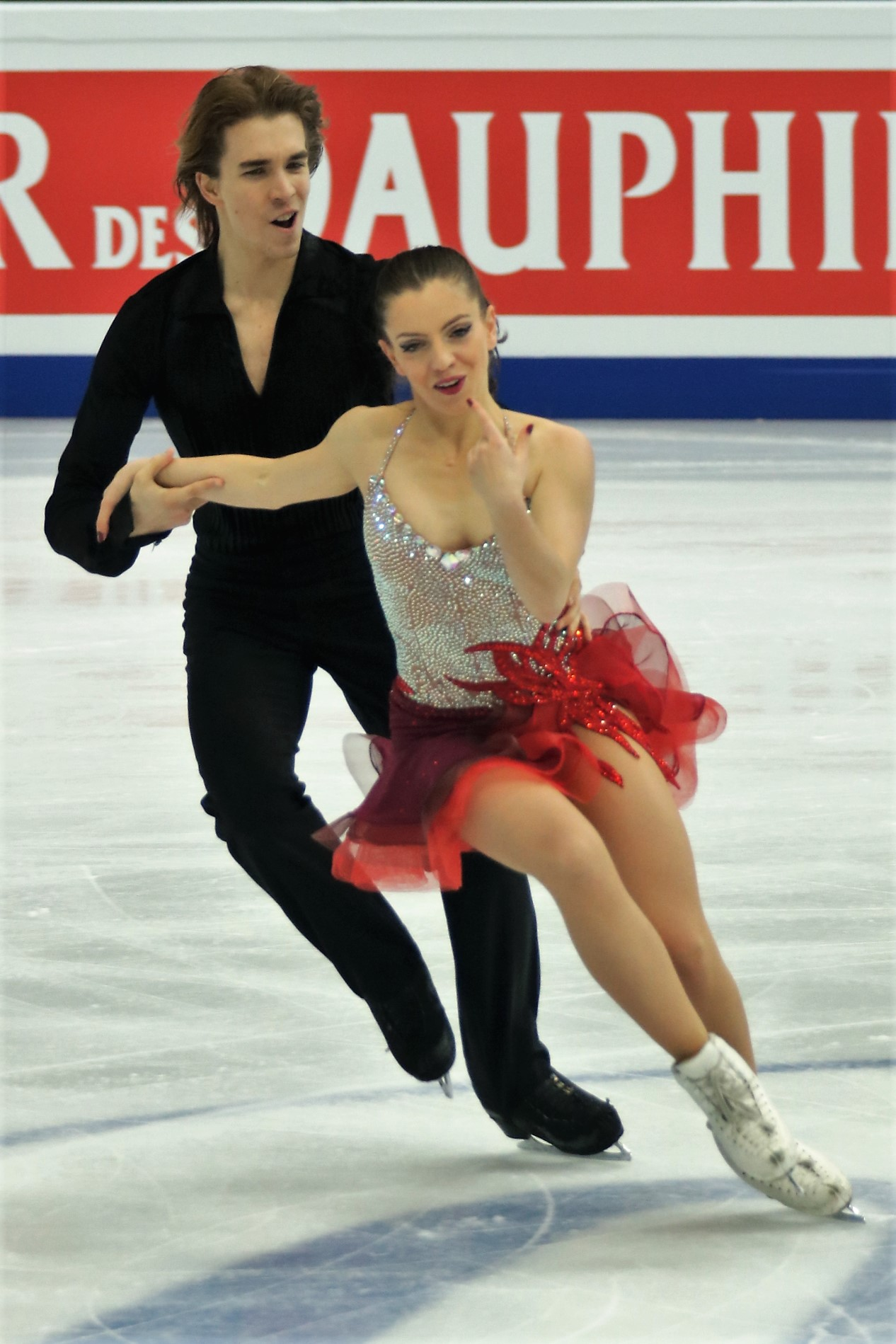
Manni/Röthlisberger at the 2018 European Championships

Prior to the season, Barbara Fusar-Poli and Stefano Caruso would join Manni/Röthlisberger's coaching team.

The duo started the season by finishing eighteenth at the 2017 CS Golden Spin of Zagreb before going on to win their second national title at the 2017–18 Swiss Championships. Selected to compete at the 2018 European Championships in Moscow, Russia, Manni/Röthlisberger finished twenty-third. They would then end the season by finishing eighth and seventh at the 2018 Bavarian Open and the 2018 Egna Dance Trophy, respectively.

=== 2018–2019 season: World Championships debut ===
Manni/Röthlisberger began the season by finishing tenth at the 2018 CS Lombardia Trophy. They then went on to place eighth at the 2018 Halloween Cup and tenth at the 2018 Volvo Open Cup. Continuing to compete on the 2018–19 ISU Challenger Series, Manni/Röthlisberger finished tenth at the 2018 CS Inge Solar Memorial – Alpen Trophy and eighth at the 2018 CS Tallinn Trophy. Two days following the latter event, Manni/Röthlisberger finished sixth at the 2018 Bosphorus Cup.

In December, the duo competed at the 2018–19 Swiss Championships, winning their third national title. They would then go on to finish seventh at the 2019 Mentor Toruń Cup.

Selected to compete at the 2019 European Championships in Minsk, Belarus, Manni/Röthlisberger would finish twenty-fourth. They then competed at the 2019 Egna Dance Trophy a couple weeks later, where they placed fifth.

At the 2019 Winter Universiade in Krasnoyarsk, Russia, they would finish ninth.

They ended the season by making their World Championship debut at the 2019 World Championships in Saitama, Japan, finishing twenty-third.

=== 2019–2020 season ===
Prior to the season, Manni/Röthlisberger decided to relocate to Zürich, Switzerland, where Alexander Gazsi would become their new coach. Beginning their season at the 2019 Volvo Open Cup, they would finish the event in sixth place. They would then go on to compete at the 2019 CS Warsaw Cup and the 2019 Bosphorus Cup, finishing tenth and seventh, respectively.

In December, Manni/Röthlisberger won their fourth and final national title for Switzerland at the 2019–20 Swiss Championships. They then went on to finish eighth at the 2020 Mentor Toruń Cup. At the 2020 European Championships in Graz, Austria, they qualified to the free dance and finished twentieth overall.

Although assigned to compete at the 2020 World Championships, the event would ultimately be cancelled due to the onset of the COVID-19 pandemic.

=== 2020–2021 season ===
Manni/Röthlisberger did not compete during this season.

=== 2021–2022 season: Debut for Italy ===
In January 2022, it was announced that Manni/Röthlisberger would begin competing for Manni's home country, Italy. Appearing at two events that season, the duo finished fifth at the 2022 Egna Dance Trophy and at the 2022 International Challenge Cup.

=== 2022–2023 season ===
Prior to the season, it was announced that Manni/Röthlisberger had relocated to Milan, where Luca Lanotte became their new coach. The team would start the season by competing on the 2022–23 ISU Challenger Series, finishing eighth at the 2022 CS Lombardia Trophy, sixth at the 2022 CS Nepela Memorial, and fourth at the 2022 CS Warsaw Cup. Between the latter two events, Manni/Röthlisberger would also place fifth at the 2022 Trophée Métropole Nice Côte d'Azur and win gold at the 2022 Mezzaluna Cup.

In December, Manni/Röthlisberger competed at the Italian Championships for the first time, where they won the silver medal behind Guignard/Fabbri. Selected to compete at the 2023 European Championships in Espoo, Finland, the team would come in eleventh place. They would follow this up with a gold medal win at the 2023 Egna Dance Trophy.

They would then conclude the season with an eighteenth-place finish at the 2023 World Championships in Saitama, Japan.

=== 2023–2024 season ===
Manni/Röthlisberger started the season with a seventh-place finish at the 2023 CS Lombardia Trophy. They would follow this up by finishing fifth at the 2023 Mezzaluna Cup and winning bronze at the 2023 Swiss Open. Continuing to compete on the 2023–24 ISU Challenger Series, the team finished fourth at the 2023 CS Warsaw Cup and eighth at the 2023 CS Golden Spin of Zagreb.

At the 2024 Italian Championships, Manni/Röthlisberger won the silver medal for a second consecutive time.

Going on to compete at the 2024 European Championships in Kaunas, Lithuania, the duo would finish fifteenth. They then concluded the season with a twenty-fifth place finish at the 2024 World Championships in Montreal, Quebec, Canada.

=== 2024–2025 season ===
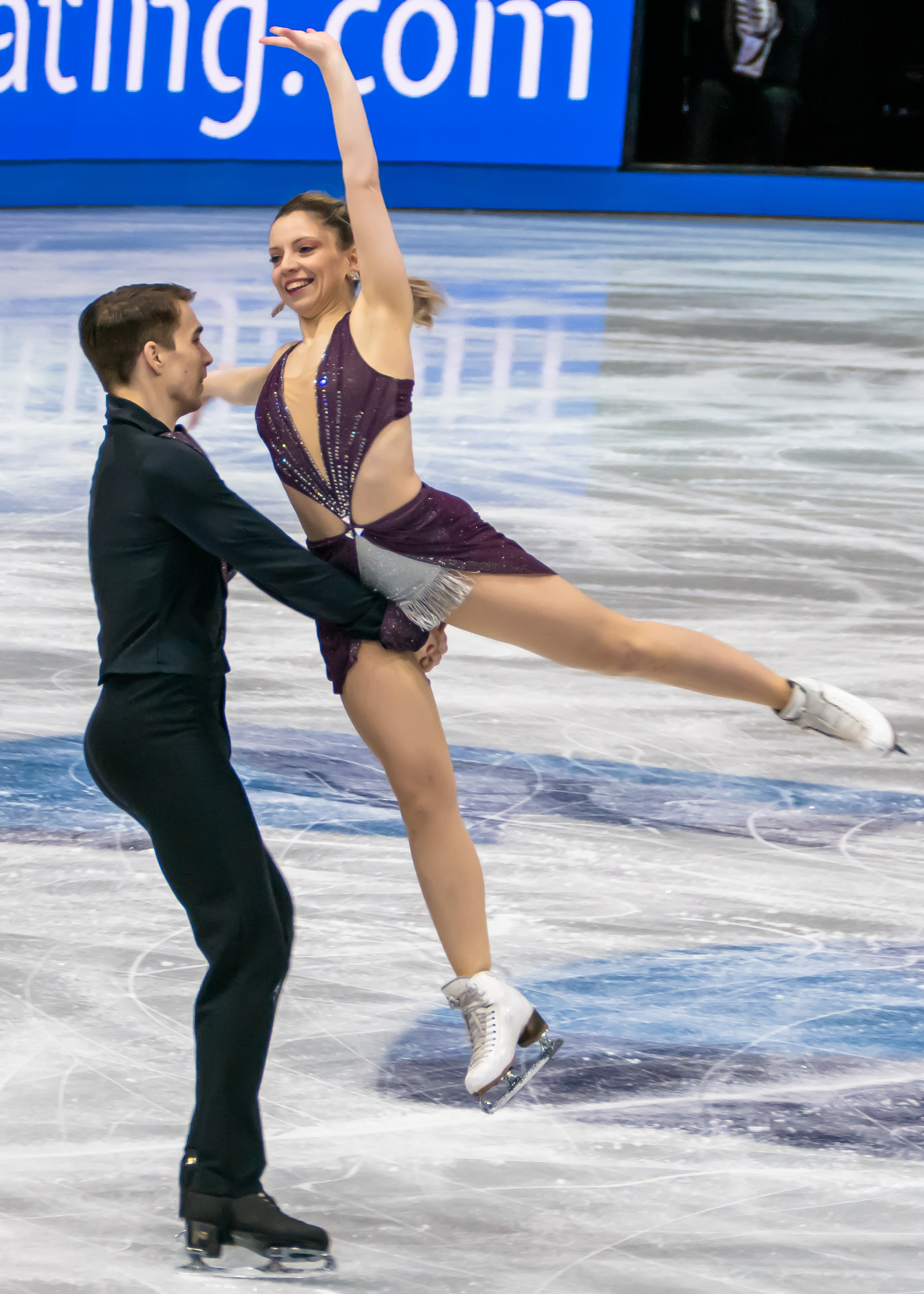
Manni/Röthlisberger performing a lift during their rhythm dance at the 2025 World Championships

Manni/Röthlisberger began their season with an eighth-place finish at the 2024 CS Nepela Memorial. They followed this up by winning silver at the 2024 Denkova-Staviski Cup. Continuing to compete on the 2024–25 ISU Challenger Series, Manni/Röthlisberger finished eighth at the 2024 CS Tallinn Trophy and seventh at the 2024 CS Warsaw Cup.

Going on to compete at the 2025 Italian Championships, the team won silver for a third consecutive time. They then went on to win silver at the 2025 Sofia Trophy.

Selected to compete at the 2025 European Championships in Tallinn, Estonia, Manni/Röthlisberger finished the event in fifteenth place. The following week, they took bronze at the 2025 Egna Dance Trophy.

They finished the season with a twenty-third place finish at the 2025 World Championships in Boston, Massachusetts, United States.

=== 2025–26 season ===
Manni/Röthlisberger opened their season with a bronze medal win at the 2025 International Ice Dance Dordrecht. They subsequently finished fifth at the 2025 CS Lombardia Trophy before going on to win silver at the 2025 Swiss Open and gold at the 2025 Denkova-Staviski Cup.

In late November, Manni/Röthlisberger placed ninth at the 2025 CS Warsaw Cup and seventh at the 2025 CS Tallinn Trophy. The following month, they won the silver medal at the 2026 Italian Championships. Selected to compete at the 2026 European Championships in Sheffield, England, United Kingdom, Manni/Röthlisberger finished the event in sixteenth place.

In late March, it was announced that Manni/Röthlisberger had made a coaching change, having begun training under Barbara Fusar Poli and Charlie White.

== Programs ==
=== Ice dance with Carlo Röthlisberger ===
Season	Rhythm dance	Free dance	Exhibition
2024–2025	Boogie Shoes; Please Don't Go; That's the Way (I Like It) by KC and the Sunshine Band choreo. by Luca Lanotte, David Cipolleschi	Titanic; The Portrait; Rose; Southampton; Death of Titanic; My Heart Will Go On by James Horner & Celine Dion choreo. by Luca Lanotte, David Cipolleschi	
2023–2024	Walk Like an Egyptian by The Bangles; Need You Tonight by INXS; Rhythm Nation by Janet Jackson; I Want to Know What Love Is by Foreigner; Dancing with Myself by Billy Idol choreo. by Luca Lanotte, David Cipolleschi	Interstellar Main Theme (from Interstellar) by Hans Zimmer; Gravity Main Theme (from Gravity) by Steven Price choreo. by Luca Lanotte, David Cipolleschi	
2022–2023	Wicked Game by Chris Isaak performed by Daisy Gray; Calabria (Ziggy & Chick Flix 2018 Remix) by Basshall Movement & Enur ft. Natasja Saad choreo. by Luca Lanotte, David Cipolleschi	Modigliani Suite by Guy Farley; My Reason by Keedie Babb; Rain, In Your Black Eyes by Ezio Bosso choreo. by Luca Lanotte, David Cipolleschi	Wicked Game by Chris Isaak performed by Daisy Gray; Calabria (Ziggy & Chick Flix 2018 Remix) by Basshall Movement & Enur ft. Natasja Saad choreo. by Luca Lanotte, David Cipolleschi
2021–2022	Naughty Girl; Love On Top; Crazy in Love by Beyoncé	Andalusian Nights by Govi; Mil pasos by Soha; Dark Gipsy by Al Marconi	
2019–2020	Everybody Needs Somebody to Love performed by The Blues Brothers; Minnie the Moocher by Cab Calloway choreo. by Alexander Gazsi, Nikolai Morozov	Slumdog Millionaire by A. R. Rahman; Ringa Ringa; Latika's Theme; Jai Ho performed by The Pussycat Dolls, Nicole Scherzinger choreo. by Alexander Gazsi, Nikolai Morozov	
2018–2019	Tango: Tango (from Cirque du Soleil); Swing: Peter Gunn Theme performed by The Blues Brothers choreo. by Barbara Fusar Poli, Corrado Giordani	Unusual Way by Frank Grifith; Cinema Italiano by Kate Hudson; Unusual Way by Frank Grifith choreo. by Barbara Fusar Poli, Corrado Giordani	
	Short dance		
2017–2018	Cha Cha: I Like It Like That by Pete Rodriguez; Rhumba: Beautiful Maria of My Soul by Andy Fortuna; Samba: Do U Only Wanna Dance by Ángel "Cucco" Peña choreo. by Mathew Gates, Svetlana Kulikova	Sixteen Tons by LeAnn Rimes; Tush by ZZ Top choreo. by Mathew Gates, Svetlana Kulikova	
2016–2017	Blues: Ain't No Sunshine by Bill Withers; Swing: Gimme Some Lovin' by The Blues Brothers choreo. by Silvia Brichese	Grande amore by Il Volo; Code Name Vivaldi by The Piano Guys choreo. by Silvia Brichese	

=== Single skating ===
Season	Short program	Free skating
2012–2013	Por una cabeza (from Scent of a Woman)	Carmen Suite by Georges Bizet
2010–2011	Fantaisie-Impromptu by Frédéric Chopin	The Postman; Tanguera

== Competitive highlights ==
- CS – Event of the ISU Challenger Series
- TBD – Assigned
- WD – Withdrew from competition

=== Ice dance with Carlo Röthlisberger (for Italy) ===
Competition placements at senior level
Season	2021–22	2022–23	2023–24	2024–25	2025–26
World Championships		18th	25th	23rd	23rd
European Championships		11th	15th	15th	16th
Italian Championships		2nd	2nd	2nd	2nd
CS Golden Spin of Zagreb			8th		
CS Lombardia Trophy		8th	7th		5th
CS Nepela Memorial		6th		8th	
CS Tallinn Trophy				8th	7th
CS Warsaw Cup		4th	4th	7th	9th
Challenge Cup	5th				
Cup of Nice		5th			
Denkova-Staviski Cup				2nd	1st
Egna Dance Trophy	5th	1st		3rd	
ICE Dance Dordrecht					3rd
Mezzaluna Cup		1st	5th		
Sofia Trophy				2nd	
Swiss Open			3rd		

=== Ice dance with Carlo Röthlisberger (for Switzerland) ===
International
Event	16–17	17–18	18–19	19–20
Worlds			23rd	C
Europeans	25th	23rd	24th	20th
CS Alpen Trophy			10th	
CS Golden Spin	13th	18th		
CS Lombardia			10th	
CS Tallinn Trophy	14th		8th	
CS Warsaw Cup				10th
Bavarian Open	14th	8th		
Bosphorus Cup			6th	7th
Egna Trophy		7th	5th	
Halloween Cup			8th	
Santa Claus Cup	3rd			
Toruń Cup	9th		7th	8th
Volvo Open Cup			10th	6th
Universiade			9th	
National
Swiss Champ.	1st	1st	1st	1st

=== Ice dance with Giacomelli (for Italy) ===
International
Event	2015–16
CS Ondrej Nepela Trophy	7th
CS Tallinn Trophy	7th
Lombardia Trophy	6th
Volvo Open Cup	4th

=== Ice dance with Naggiar (for Italy) ===
International
Event	2014–15
International Cup of Nice	10th
National
Italian Championships	7th

=== Single skating (for Italy) ===
International
Event	07–08	09–10	10–11	11–12	12–13	13–14
Denkova-Staviski					6th	13th
Ondrej Nepela						22nd
International: Junior
JGP Germany			23rd			
JGP Italy				21st		
JGP Slovenia					25th	
Bavarian Open				8th	8th	
Crystal Skate					13th	
Coupe Printemps				11th		
Cup of Nice				12th		
Ice Star					6th	
NRW Trophy				22nd		
Santa Claus Cup					10th	
Toruń Cup			2nd			
Triglav Trophy			5th	9th		
National
Italian Champ.	12th J	9th J		11th	9th	

== Detailed results ==
=== Ice dance with Carlo Röthlisberger (for Italy) ===
ISU personal best scores in the +5/-5 GOE System
Segment	Type	Score	Event
Total	TSS	172.32	2025 CS Warsaw Cup
Rhythm dance	TSS	68.88	2024 CS Warsaw Cup
Rhythm dance	TES	39.75	2024 CS Warsaw Cup
Rhythm dance	PCS	29.93	2025 CS Warsaw Cup
Free dance	TSS	104.22	2025 CS Warsaw Cup
Free dance	TES	59.62	2025 CS Warsaw Cup
Free dance	PCS	45.60	2025 CS Warsaw Cup

Results in the 2021–22 season
Date	Event	RD		FD		Total	
Date	Event	P	Score	P	Score	P	Score
Feb 4–6, 2022	(Italy) 2022 Egna Dance Trophy	3	66.00	6	94.75	5	160.75
Feb 24–27, 2022	(Netherlands) 2022 Challenge Cup	6	55.23	4	90.19	5	145.42

Results in the 2022–23 season
Date	Event	RD		FD		Total	
Date	Event	P	Score	P	Score	P	Score
Sep 16–19, 2022	(Italy) 2022 CS Lombardia Trophy	8	57.66	6	95.64	8	153.30
Sep 29 – Oct 1, 2022	(Slovakia) 2022 CS Nepela Memorial	5	60.32	6	95.47	6	155.79
Oct 19–23, 2022	(France) 2022 Trophée Métropole Nice Côte d'Azur	5	61.95	5	91.68	5	153.63
Oct 28–30, 2022	(Italy) 2022 Mezzaluna Cup	1	65.46	1	101.96	1	167.42
Nov 17–20, 2022	(Poland) 2022 CS Warsaw Cup	4	64.45	4	101.04	4	165.49
Dec 15–18, 2022	(Italy) 2023 Italian Championships	2	69.54	2	106.95	2	176.49
Jan 25–29, 2023	(Finland) 2023 European Championships	11	64.23	11	99.98	11	164.21
Feb 9–12, 2023	(Italy) 2023 Egna Dance Trophy	1	69.65	1	107.99	1	177.64
Mar 22–26, 2023	(Japan) 2023 World Championships	18	64.02	17	98.95	18	162.97

Results in the 2023–24 season
Date	Event	RD		FD		Total	
Date	Event	P	Score	P	Score	P	Score
Sep 8–10, 2023	(Italy) 2023 CS Lombardia Trophy	7	60.41	6	100.49	7	160.90
Oct 20–22, 2023	(Italy) 2023 Mezzaluna Cup	6	64.83	4	103.06	5	167.89
Oct 26–29, 2023	(Switzerland) 2023 Swiss Open	3	62.66	3	99.87	3	162.53
Nov 16–19, 2023	(Poland) 2023 CS Warsaw Cup	4	64.89	5	103.34	4	168.23
Dec 6–9, 2023	(Croatia) 2023 CS Golden Spin of Zagreb	8	62.83	8	97.52	8	160.35
Dec 22–23, 2023	(Italy) 2024 Italian Championships	2	70.45	2	107.30	2	177.75
Jan 10–14, 2024	(Lithuania) 2024 European Championships	15	62.26	15	100.83	15	163.09
Mar 18–24, 2024	(Canada) 2024 World Championships	25	63.64	—N/a	—N/a	25	63.64

Results in the 2024–25 season
Date	Event	RD		FD		Total	
Date	Event	P	Score	P	Score	P	Score
Oct 24–26, 2024	(Slovakia) 2024 CS Nepela Memorial	8	66.46	9	99.76	8	166.22
Nov 5–10, 2024	(Bulgaria) 2024 Denkova-Staviski Cup	2	69.74	2	106.98	2	176.72
Nov 11–17, 2024	(Estonia) 2024 CS Tallinn Trophy	7	67.45	8	101.03	8	168.48
Nov 20–24, 2024	(Poland) 2024 CS Warsaw Cup	6	68.88	7	101.87	7	170.75
Dec 19–21, 2024	(Italy) 2025 Italian Championships	3	71.75	2	108.57	2	180.32
Jan 7–12, 2025	(Bulgaria) 2025 Sofia Trophy	2	70.31	3	107.20	2	177.51
Jan 28 – Feb 2, 2025	(Estonia) 2025 European Championships	16	65.46	15	103.68	15	169.14
Feb 7–9, 2025	(Italy) 2025 Egna Dance Trophy	2	75.38	3	102.31	3	177.69
Mar 24–30, 2025	(United States) 2025 World Championships	23	66.57	—N/a	—N/a	23	66.57

Results in the 2025–26 season
Date	Event	RD		FD		Total	
Date	Event	P	Score	P	Score	P	Score
Aug 16–17, 2025	(Netherlands) 2025 International ICE Dance Dordrecht	3	64.80	2	94.94	3	159.74
Sep 11–14, 2025	(Italy) 2025 CS Lombardia Trophy	5	65.02	5	101.55	5	166.57
Nov 7–9, 2025	(Bulgaria) 2025 Denkova-Staviski Cup	1	73.58	2	107.81	1	181.39
Nov 19–23, 2025	(Poland) 2025 CS Warsaw Cup	9	68.10	10	104.22	9	172.32
Nov 25–30, 2025	(Estonia) 2025 CS Tallinn Trophy	7	68.23	7	103.11	7	171.43
Dec 17–20, 2025	(Italy) 2026 Italian Championships	2	73.72	2	106.32	2	180.04
Jan 13–18, 2026	(United Kingdom) 2026 European Championships	13	67.84	17	102.21	16	170.05
Mar 24–29, 2026	(Czech Republic) 2026 World Championships	23	63.84	—N/a	—N/a	23	63.84
