= 2025 CS Warsaw Cup =

International figure skating competition

- Type: ISU Challenger Series
- Date: 19 – 23 November
- Season: 2025–26
- Location: Warsaw, Poland
- Host: Polish Figure Skating Association
- Venue: Arena COS Torwar

Champions
- Men's singles: (Poland) Vladimir Samoilov
- Women's singles: (Canada) Sara-Maude Dupuis
- Pairs: (Canada) Deanna Stellato-Dudek and Maxime Deschamps
- Ice dance: (France) Evgeniia Lopareva and Geoffrey Brissaud
- Previous: 2024 CS Warsaw Cup
- Previous CS: 2025 CS Trialeti Trophy
- Next CS: 2025 CS Tallinn Trophy

The 2025 Warsaw Cup was a figure skating competition sanctioned by the International Skating Union (ISU), organized and hosted by the Polish Figure Skating Association, and the ninth event of the 2025–26 ISU Challenger Series. It was held at the Arena COS Torwar in Warsaw, Poland, from 19 to 23 November 2025. Medals were awarded in men's singles, women's singles, and ice dance, and skaters earned ISU World Standing points based on their results. Vladimir Samoilov of Poland won the men's event, Sara-Maude Dupuis of Canada won the women's event, and Evgeniia Lopareva and Geoffrey Brissaud of France won the ice dance event. A separate competition in pair skating was held, which was not part of the Challenger Series; it was won by Deanna Stellato-Dudek and Maxime Deschamps of Canada.

== Background ==
The inaugural edition of the Warsaw Cup was held in 2002 and consisted only of the men's and women's events at the junior level. The Warsaw Cup was exclusively a junior-level competition until 2010, when a senior-level pairs event was added. Men's and women's events at the senior level were added in 2012.

The ISU Challenger Series was introduced in 2014. It is a series of international figure skating competitions sanctioned by the International Skating Union (ISU) and organized by ISU member nations. The objective was to ensure consistent organization and structure within a series of international competitions linked together, providing opportunities for senior-level skaters to compete at the international level and also earn ISU World Standing points. The Warsaw Cup was a Challenger Series event from 2014 to 2017. It was held in 2018, but not as part of the Challenger Series, and returned to the Challenger Series in 2019. No competition was held in 2020 due to the COVID-19 pandemic. The competition returned in 2021 and has been a Challenger Series event ever since. The 2025–26 Challenger Series consists of eleven events, of which the Warsaw Cup was the ninth.

== Changes to preliminary assignments ==
The International Skating Union published the preliminary list of entrants on 30 October 2025.

Date	Discipline	Withdrew	Added	Ref.
6 November	Women	(Argentina); Michelle DiCicco	—N/a	
6 November	Women	(Estonia); Nataly Langerbaur	—N/a	
6 November	Women	(Slovakia); Ema Doboszová	—N/a	
6 November	Women	(Slovakia); Vanesa Šelmeková	—N/a	
6 November	Women	(Ukraine); Sofiia Ekzarkhova	—N/a	
6 November	Women	(Ukraine); Taisiia Spesivtseva	—N/a	
6 November	Women	(United States); Isabeau Levito	—N/a	
6 November	Women	—N/a	(Israel); Julia Fennell	
6 November	Ice dance	(United Kingdom); Sophia Bushell; Antonio Pena	—N/a	
10 November	Men	(United States); Jacob Sanchez	—N/a	
10 November	Men	—N/a	(Israel); Lev Vinokur	
10 November	Women	(Switzerland); Kimmy Repond	—N/a	
10 November	Ice dance	(Australia); Holly Harris; Jason Chan	—N/a	

== Required performance elements ==
=== Single skating ===
Men competing in single skating first performed their short programs on Thursday, 20 November, while women performed theirs on Saturday, 22 November. Lasting no more than 2 minutes 40 seconds, the short program had to include the following elements:

For men: one double or triple Axel; one triple or quadruple jump; one jump combination consisting of a double jump and a triple jump, two triple jumps, or a quadruple jump and a double jump or triple jump; one flying spin; one camel spin or sit spin with a change of foot; one spin combination with a change of foot; and a step sequence using the full ice surface.

For women: one double or triple Axel; one triple jump; one jump combination consisting of a double jump and a triple jump, or two triple jumps; one flying spin; one layback spin, sideways leaning spin, camel spin, or sit spin without a change of foot; one spin combination with a change of foot; and one step sequence using the full ice surface.

Men performed their free skates on Friday, 21 November, while women performed theirs on Sunday, 23 November. The free skate performance for both men and women could last no more than 4 minutes, and had to include the following: seven jump elements, of which one had to be an Axel-type jump; three spins, of which one had to be a spin combination, one had to be a flying spin, and one had to be a spin with only one position; a step sequence; and a choreographic sequence.

=== Ice dance ===
Couples competing in ice dance performed their rhythm dances on Wednesday, 19 November. Lasting no more than 2 minutes 50 seconds, the theme of the rhythm dance this season was "music, dance styles, and feeling of the 1990s". Examples of applicable dance styles and music included, but were not limited to: pop, Latin, house, techno, hip-hop, and grunge. The rhythm dance had to include the following elements: one pattern dance step sequence, one choreographic rhythm sequence, one dance lift, one set of sequential twizzles, and one step sequence.

Couples then performed their free dances on Thursday, 20 November. The free dance performance could last no longer than 4 minutes, and had to include the following: three dance lifts, one dance spin, one set of synchronized twizzles, one step sequence in hold, one step sequence while on one skate and not touching, and three choreographic elements.

== Judging ==
Skaters were judged according to the required technical elements of their program (such as jumps and spins), as well as the overall presentation of their program, based on three program components (skating skills, presentation, and composition). Each technical element in a figure skating performance was assigned a predetermined base point value and scored by a panel of nine judges on a scale from −5 to +5 based on the quality of its execution. Each Grade of Execution (GOE) from –5 to +5 was assigned a value as indicated on the Scale of Values. For example, a triple Axel was worth a base value of 8.00 points, and a GOE of +3 was worth 2.40 points, so a triple Axel with a GOE of +3 earned 10.40 points. The judging panel's GOE for each element was determined by calculating the trimmed mean (the average after discarding the highest and lowest scores). The panel's scores for all elements were added together to generate a Total Elements Score. At the same time, the judges evaluated each performance based on the five aforementioned program components and assigned each a score from 0.25 to 10 in 0.25-point increments. The judging panel's final score for each program component was also determined by calculating the trimmed mean. Those scores were then multiplied by the factor shown on the chart below; the results were added together to generate a total Program Component Score.

Program component factoring
Discipline	Short program or Rhythm dance	Free skate or Free dance
Men	1.67	3.33
Women	1.33	2.67
Ice dance	1.33	2.00

Deductions were applied for certain violations, such as time infractions, stops and restarts, or falls. The Total Elements Score and Program Component Score were then added together, minus any deductions, to generate a final performance score for each skater or team.

== Medal summary ==
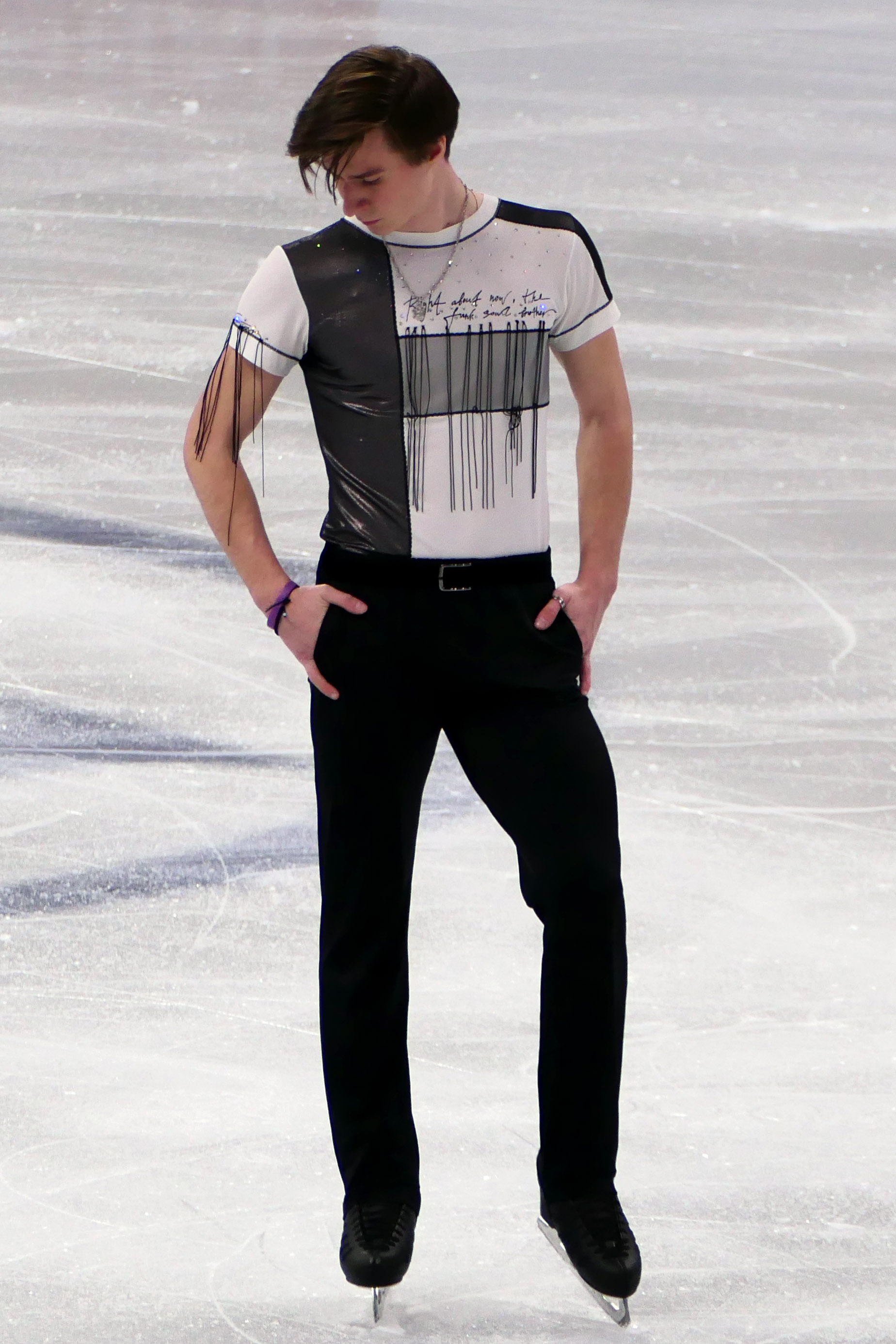
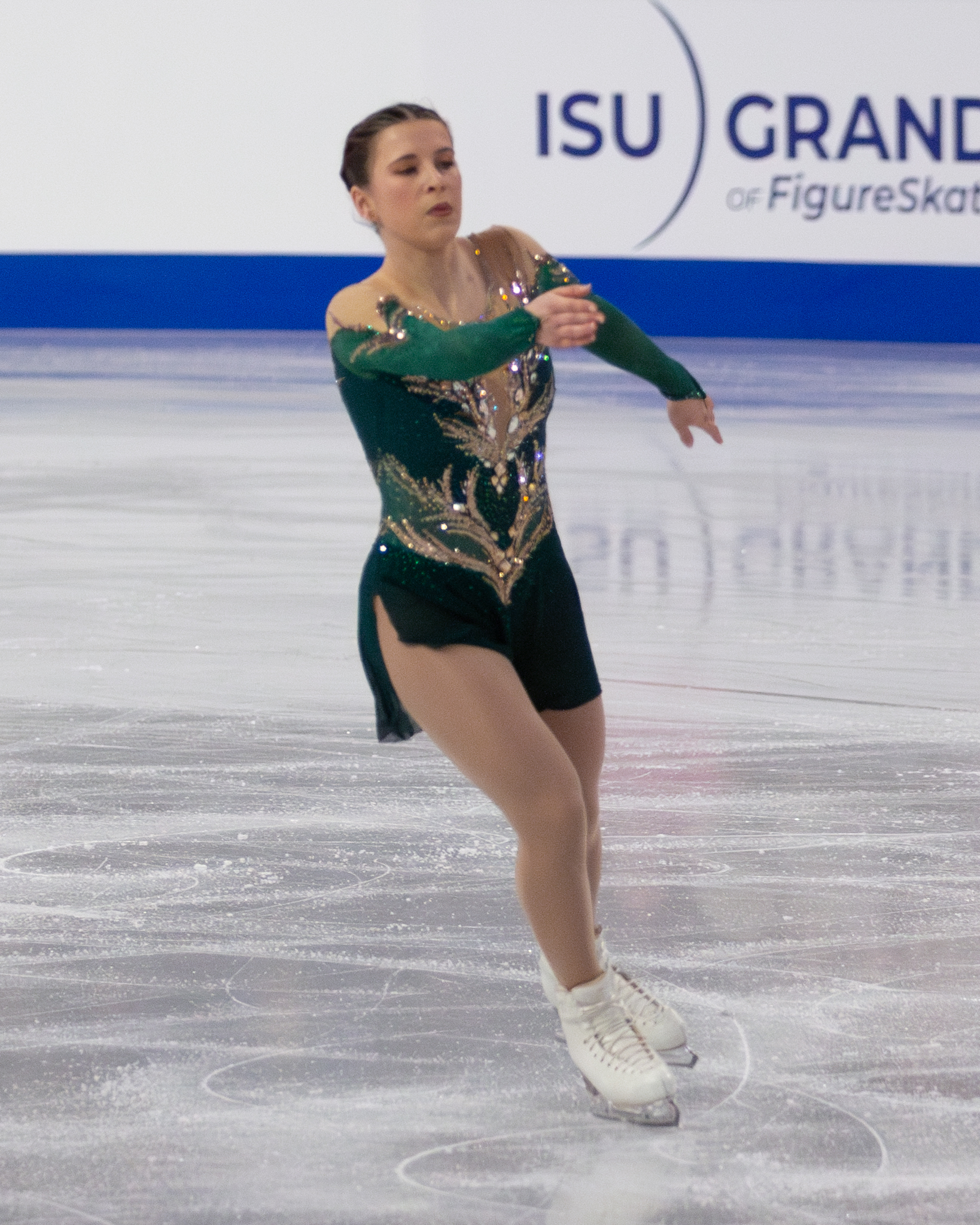
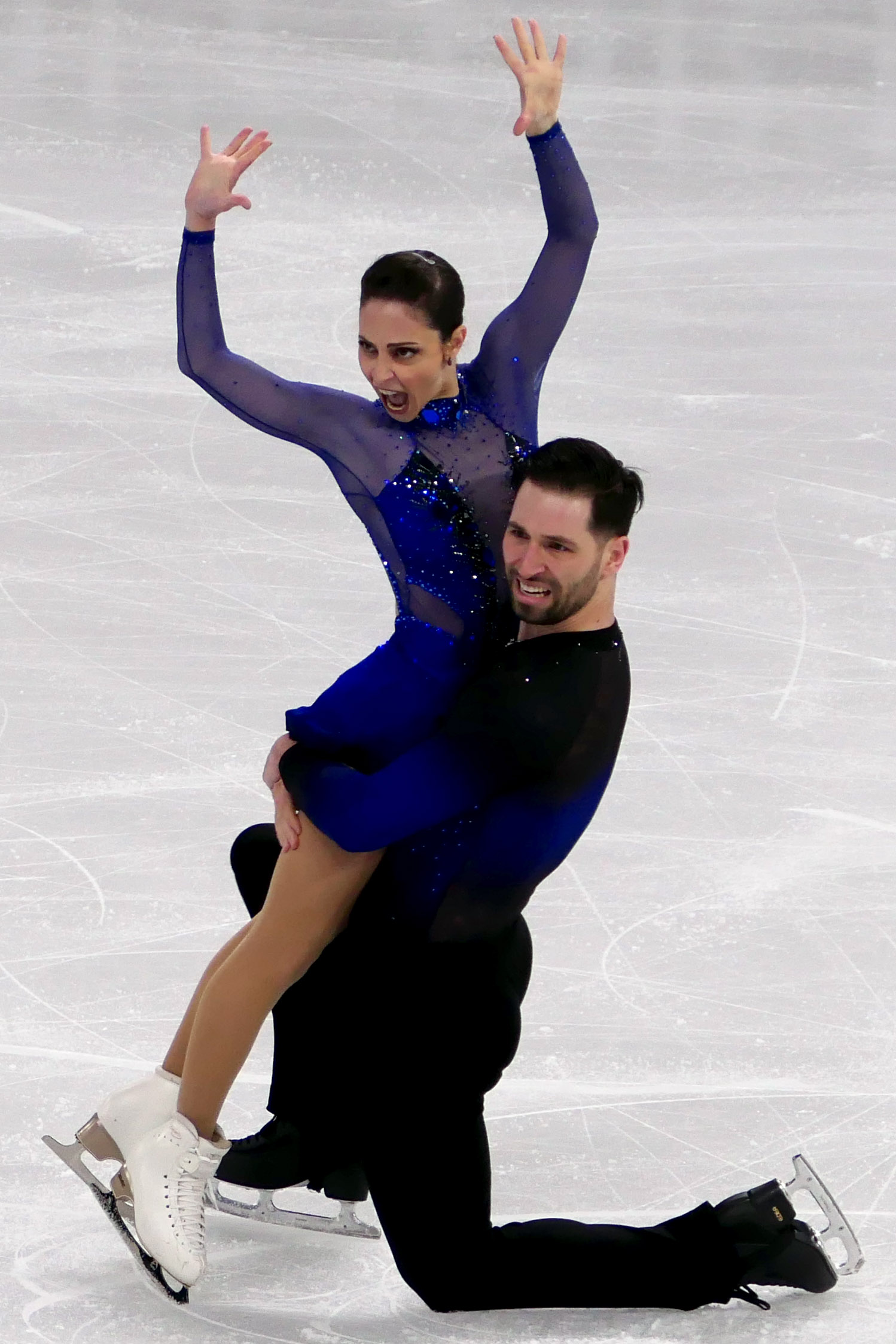
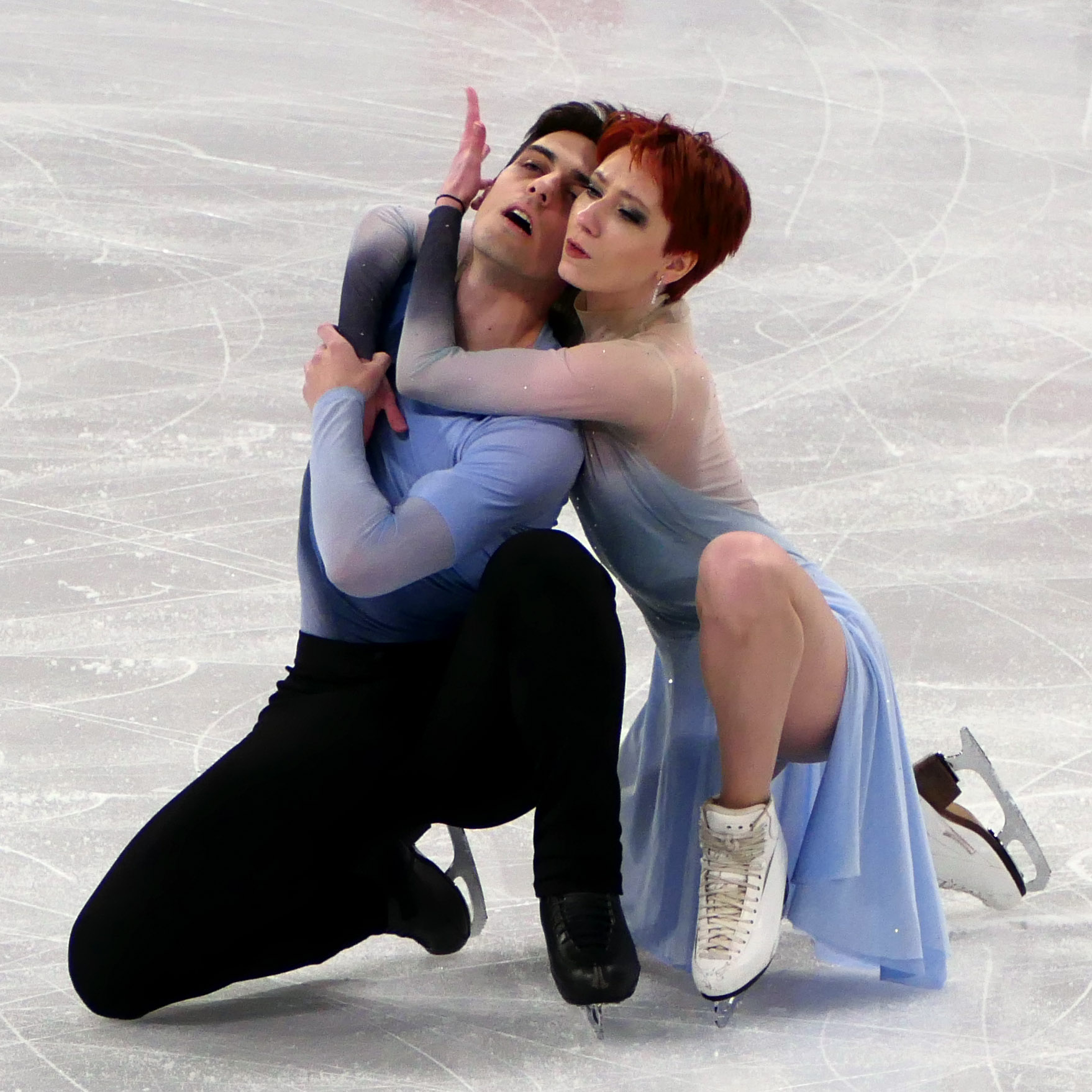
The 2025 Warsaw Cup champions: Vladimir Samoilov of Poland (men's singles); Sara-Maude Dupuis of Canada (women's singles); Deanna Stellato-Dudek and Maxime Deschamps of Canada (pair skating); and Evgeniia Lopareva and Geoffrey Brissaud of France (ice dance)

Medalists
Discipline	Gold	Silver	Bronze
Men	(Poland) Vladimir Samoilov	(Switzerland) Lukas Britschgi	(France) Samy Hammi
Women	(Canada) Sara-Maude Dupuis	(Italy) Marina Piredda	(Norway) Mia Risa Gomez
Pairs	(Canada); Deanna Stellato-Dudek; Maxime Deschamps	(United Kingdom); Anastasia Vaipan-Law; Luke Digby	(United States); Katie McBeath; Daniil Parkman
Ice dance	(France); Evgeniia Lopareva; Geoffrey Brissaud	(South Korea); Hannah Lim; Ye Quan	(United States); Caroline Green; Michael Parsons

== Results ==
=== Men's singles ===
Gabriele Frangipani of Italy withdrew from the competition after the short program due to a back injury.

Men's results
Rank	Skater	Nation	Total points	SP		FS	
1st place, gold medalist(s)	Vladimir Samoilov	Poland	240.83	1	85.08	1	155.75
2nd place, silver medalist(s)	Lukas Britschgi	Switzerland	229.73	2	82.76	2	146.97
3rd place, bronze medalist(s)	Samy Hammi	France	222.77	4	75.87	3	146.90
4	Genrikh Gartung	Germany	203.45	8	66.15	4	137.30
5	Ivan Shmuratko	Ukraine	201.76	3	76.44	12	125.32
6	Tamir Kuperman	Israel	200.10	5	73.14	10	126.96
7	Ean Weiler	Switzerland	199.45	11	63.06	6	136.39
8	Jakub Lofek	Poland	199.35	12	62.18	5	137.17
9	Wesley Chiu	Canada	198.51	10	63.75	7	134.76
10	Landry le May	France	193.64	9	63.87	9	129.77
11	Artur Smagulov	Kazakhstan	192.81	14	61.85	8	130.96
12	Matvii Yefymenko	Poland	188.02	13	62.11	11	125.91
13	Xan Rols	France	181.34	18	56.58	14	124.76
14	Makar Suntsev	Finland	180.13	16	57.42	15	122.71
15	Kornel Witkowski	Poland	178.87	6	67.89	17	110.98
16	Kai Jagoda	Germany	178.34	20	53.14	13	125.20
17	Dias Jirenbayev	Kazakhstan	176.13	7	66.70	18	109.43
18	Arthur Wolfgang Mai	Germany	173.71	15	60.67	16	113.04
19	Lev Vinokur	Israel	163.54	17	56.90	19	106.64
20	Georgii Pavlov	Switzerland	151.06	24	49.61	20	101.45
21	Pablo García	Spain	147.85	22	52.12	22	95.73
22	Euken Alberdi	Spain	146.58	23	50.20	21	96.38
23	Iker Oyarzabal Albas	Spain	143.58	21	53.00	24	90.58
24	Arttu Juusola	Finland	130.09	26	36.40	23	93.69
25	Daniel Korabelnik	Lithuania	126.15	25	44.39	25	81.76
WD	Gabriele Frangipani	Italy	Withdrew	19	56.10	Withdrew from competition	

=== Women's singles ===
Women's results
Rank	Skater	Nation	Total points	SP		FS	
1st place, gold medalist(s)	Sara-Maude Dupuis	Canada	185.66	1	66.23	1	119.43
2nd place, silver medalist(s)	Marina Piredda	Italy	172.05	2	62.55	2	109.5
3rd place, bronze medalist(s)	Mia Risa Gomez	Norway	161.96	6	53.81	3	108.15
4	Sarina Joos	Italy	159.22	4	54.99	4	104.23
5	Meda Variakojytė	Lithuania	157.17	7	53.31	5	103.86
6	Kristina Lisovskaja	Estonia	156.6	5	54.08	6	102.52
7	Anna Pezzetta	Italy	155.43	3	59.56	11	95.87
8	Jogailė Aglinskytė	Lithuania	151.85	8	51.98	8	99.87
9	Laura Szczesna	Poland	149.38	10	50.4	9	98.98
10	Stefania Yakovleva	Cyprus	148.85	11	50.34	10	98.51
11	Niki Wories	Netherlands	148.25	12	47.88	7	100.37
12	Aleksandra Golovkina-Dolinske	Lithuania	141.49	9	51.42	13	90.07
13	Karolina Bialas	Poland	135.21	17	44.75	12	90.46
14	Anna Elizabeth Grekul	Germany	125.81	13	46.9	15	78.91
15	Sarah Marie Pesch	Germany	125.44	20	41.31	14	84.13
16	Weronika Ferlin	Poland	123.86	15	45.75	18	78.11
17	Nela Šnebergerová	Czech Republic	123.81	16	45.5	17	78.31
18	Minja Peltonen	Finland	123.3	14	46.1	20	77.2
19	Taisiia Spesivtseva	Ukraine	122.67	18	44.29	16	78.38
20	Oona Ounasvuori	Finland	118.65	19	43.36	21	75.29
21	Marietta Atkins	Poland	115.69	21	40.53	22	75.16
22	Jade Hovine	Belgium	114.57	23	36.62	19	77.95
23	Adela Vallova	Czech Republic	98.51	25	31.59	23	66.92
24	Julia Fennell	Israel	90.77	24	33.29	24	57.48
25	Magdalena Zawadzka	Poland	87.19	22	38.33	26	48.86
26	Martaliis Kuslap	Estonia	85.72	26	29.85	25	55.87

=== Ice dance ===
Ice dance results
Rank	Team	Nation	Total points	RD		FD	
1st place, gold medalist(s)	Evgeniia Lopareva; Geoffrey Brissaud	France	202.06	1	80.46	1	121.60
2nd place, silver medalist(s)	Hannah Lim; Ye Quan	South Korea	190.26	3	76.02	3	114.24
3rd place, bronze medalist(s)	Caroline Green; Michael Parsons	United States	189.27	2	79.09	7	110.18
4	Emily Bratti; Ian Somerville	United States	187.85	4	72.91	2	114.94
5	Jennifer Janse van Rensburg; Benjamin Steffan	Germany	182.97	5	71.71	4	111.26
6	Marie Dupayage; Thomas Nabais	France	179.54	6	69.13	6	110.41
7	Sofía Val; Asaf Kazimov	Spain	179.29	7	68.81	5	110.48
8	Shira Ichilov; Mikhail Nosovitskiy	Israel	173.38	11	67.08	9	106.30
9	Victoria Manni; Carlo Röthlisberger	Italy	172.32	9	68.10	10	104.22
10	Carolane Soucisse; Shane Firus	Ireland	171.91	8	68.46	11	103.45
11	Charise Matthaei; Max Liebers	Germany	171.56	14	65.01	8	106.55
12	Giulia Isabella Paolino; Andrea Tuba	Italy	168.29	13	65.37	12	102.92
13	Mariia Pinchuk; Mykyta Pogorielov	Ukraine	166.76	15	63.90	13	102.86
14	Mariia Ignateva; Danijil Szemko	Hungary	164.16	12	65.73	15	98.43
15	Zoe Larson; Andrii Kapran	Ukraine	164.16	16	62.34	14	101.71
16	Isabella Flores; Linus Colmor Jepsen	United States	161.48	10	67.71	19	93.77
17	Sofiia Dovhal; Wiktor Kulesza	Poland	156.82	17	60.05	16	96.77
18	Arianna Sassi; Luca Morini	Switzerland	153.49	18	59.70	18	93.79
19	Zofia Grzegorzewska; Oleg Muratov	Poland	150.03	21	55.91	17	94.12
20	Carlotta Argentieri; Francesco Riva	Italy	148.95	20	56.19	20	92.76
21	Lilia Schubert; Nikita Remeshevskiy	Germany	146.25	19	59.01	22	87.24
22	Emese Csiszèr; Mark Shapiro	Hungary	146.11	23	55.36	21	90.75
23	Lara Luft; Ilias Fourati	Hungary	137.77	25	54.27	23	83.50
24	Helena Carhart; Filip Bojanowski	Poland	136.92	24	54.73	24	82.19
25	Olexandra Borysova; Aron Freeman	Poland	125.15	26	49.48	25	75.67
WD	Milla Ruud Reitan; Nikolaj Majorov	Sweden	Withdrew	22	55.81	Withdrew from competition	

== Works cited ==
- "Special Regulations & Technical Rules – Single & Pair Skating and Ice Dance 2024" (PDF). International Skating Union. Archived (PDF) from the original on 3 June 2025.
