= Lavett =

Lavett is a surname. Notable people with the surname include:

- Darren Lavett (1964–2012), American music video director
- John Lavett (1926–2006), Australian public servant and diplomat

== See also ==
- Lavette
- Lavett Bluff, in Antarctica
- Lovett (surname)
