= Lavette =

Lavette or LaVette is a surname. Notable people with the surname include:

- Bettye LaVette (born 1946), American singer-songwriter
- Robert Lavette (born 1963), American football player

== See also ==
- Lanette
- Lavett, surname
