= Al Marconi =

- Born: September 27, 1969 (age 56)
- Origin: Plymouth, Devon, England
- Genres: World fusion
- Instrument: Spanish guitar
- Label: Independent EGO Recordings
- Website: http://www.almarconi.com

Al Marconi is an English internationally known performer who plays the Spanish guitar in the world fusion, contemporary classical music, and Latin music genres. He is an independent recording artist, composer and producer with YouTube views of more than 74 million. "Porcelain Rose", a track from his Terra Nova album, has achieved over 10 million views, while "Redemption" also has 10 million views and "Dark Gypsy" over 7 million.

== Discography ==
- 1997: Equilibrium
- 1999: Monument
- 2000: Esperanto
- 2007: Terra Nova
- 2011: Insomnia
- 2015: Alchemy
- 2018: Heartstrings
