= Govi (musician) =

German musician (born 1949)

- Born: Santoo Govi; February 27, 1949 (age 77); Germany
- Origin: (United States) U.S.
- Genres: New age, new flamenco, instrumental, World, ethnic fusion
- Occupations: Musician, guitarist, composer
- Instrument: Guitar
- Years active: 1988–present
- Labels: Real Music, Higher Octave Music, Govi Music
- Website: www.govimusic.com

Santoo Govi (born February 27, 1949) is a new age and ambient German American musician. Each of Govi's albums have reached Top 10 on Billboard's New Age chart.

== Biography ==
Govi was born as Werner Monka in Germany. During his teens, he lived in Minden, Germany, near Bielefeld. There, he performed as the lead guitarist in bands including Blackbird (1962), Virus (1971), and Weed (1971, with Ken Hensley of Uriah Heep). These experiences led to his first live performance as a member of a group that won a national band competition and a recording contract that allowed them to tour throughout Germany.

Although a native of Germany, Govi decided to leave Europe. He sold his electric guitar, a Gibson Les Paul, to pay for the flight to India, where he changed his name first to Govinda, then Govi. He spent eight years living in India. He started playing the mandolin, mandocello, sitar, bouzouki, charango, and the eight string ukulele. While in India, he established a friendship with the German new age artists Deuter and Karunesh. Deuter co-produced Govi's first album Sky High, throughout which Deuter can be heard playing flutes and keyboards.

Govi has released 19 albums. His fifth album, Guitar Odyssey, became one of the most successful albums in its genre, reaching the top ten of the Billboard new age albums, eventually climbing to number three. In 2022, Govi released a new extended play featuring four new songs.

Govi currently lives in Kula, Hawaii. He often collaborates with German musician Karunesh, who also lives in Hawaii.

== Discography ==
=== Studio albums ===
- 1988 - Sky High
- 1991 - Heart of a Gypsy
- 1993 - Cuchama
- 1995 - Passion & Grace
- 1997 - Guitar Odyssey
- 1999 - No Strings Attached: Govi at his Exuberant Best
- 1999 - Andalusian Nights
- 2000 - Seventh Heaven
- 2001 - Your Lingering Touch: Govi at his Romantic Best
- 2002 - Mosaico
- 2004 - Saffron & Silk
- 2005 - Havana Sunset: The Best of Govi
- 2007 - Jewel Box
- 2008 - Touch of Light
- 2011 - Guitarra Mistica
- 2013 - Pure at Heart
- 2015 - The High Road
- 2018 - Luminosity
- 2022 - Four 4 U (EP)

=== Other compilations ===
- 1997 - Tranquility (A Real Music Sampler)
- 1997 - Rhythm: A Real Music Sampler
- 1998 - Eternity II: The Encore-(A Romantic Collection)
- 2001 - Letting the World Go By
- 2002 - Moonlight Fantasy
- 2004 - Confort Music 1
- 2006 - InSPAration
- 2006 - iRelax During a Busy Day
- 2006 - iRelax Leaving the Workday Behind
- 2007 - iRelax for Lovers
- 2007 - iRelax in Traffic
- 2012 - Reverie
- 2017 - Relaxation Collection 2 - Cool Breeze, Gentle Rhythms

== Other compilation appearances ==
- 1997 - Gypsy Passion: New Flamenco (Narada)
- 1999 - Obsession: New Flamenco Romance (Narada)
- 2000 - Gypsy Fire (Narada)
- 2000 - Guitar Greats: The Best of New Flamenco - Volume I (Baja/TSR Records)
- 2004 - Barcelona: Music Celebrating the Flavors of the World (Williams Sonoma)
- 2009 - Gypsy Spice: Best Of New Flamenco (Baja/TSR Records)
- 2011 - The World Of The Spanish Guitar Vol. 1 (Higher Octave Music)
- 2013 - Guitar Greats: The Best of New Flamenco - Volume III (Baja/TSR Records)

== See also ==
- New Flamenco
- Flamenco rumba
- New-age music
