= 2020–21 ISU Challenger Series =

- Type: ISU Challenger Series
- Date: September 9 – December 5, 2020
- Season: 2020–21
- Previous: 2019–20 ISU Challenger Series
- Next: 2021–22 ISU Challenger Series

The 2020–21 ISU Challenger Series was scheduled to be held from September 9 to December 5, 2020. It was the seventh season that the ISU Challenger Series, a group of senior-level international figure skating competitions, was held. Originally meant to be a series of ten events, the 2020–21 Challenger Series ended up featuring only two individual events, when eight events were cancelled due to the COVID-19 pandemic.

== Impact of the COVID-19 pandemic ==
The International Skating Union announcement on April 22, 2020 for the 2020–21 ISU Challenger Series issued the following caveat regarding the scheduling of the events:

"The above calendar, same as the calendar of other ISU series, is subject to a timely normalization of the coronavirus situation allowing the safe organization of ice skating events this Autumn. While the Challenger Series events remain the property of the organizing ISU Members who remain the key decision makers for those events, the ISU is closely monitoring the respective developments with the expectation and hope that the situation will be restored to normal as quickly as possible. The ISU will inform ISU Members in case of any development or related ISU recommendations and/or decision."

On May 1, 2020, the International Skating Union established a working group, chaired by ISU Vice-president for Figure Skating Alexander Lakernik, to monitor the ongoing COVID-19 pandemic. Its responsibilities included determining the feasibility of holding events as scheduled, possibly behind closed doors, during the first half of the season, and the financial impact of any potential cancellations. The ISU announced that a host federation must make a decision regarding potential cancellation of their event at least twelve weeks prior to the event.

On May 16, the Slovak Figure Skating Association informed the ISU that it had cancelled all upcoming events that it was scheduled to host due to the ongoing pandemic, including the 2020 Nepela Memorial in Bratislava.

On July 13, the ISU announced that the 2020–21 Challenger Series events would be regarded as separate individual competitions, rather than as a series; as a result, no Challenger Series ranking would be determined and no prize money would be distributed at the end of the series. However, skaters competing would still earn Challenger Series-level points towards the World Standings and Season's World Ranking, as long as the competition met ISU guidelines to qualify as a Challenger event. The decision was later revised by the ISU council on August 3, announcing that world standing and ranking points would not be awarded for the sake of fairness due to the limited nature of the competitions.

On July 13, the Japan Skating Federation announced that it would not assign any skaters to the Challenger Series, assuming the competitions proceeded as scheduled.

On August 25, the German Ice Skating Union confirmed that 2020 Nebelhorn Trophy would be held as scheduled, but without spectators and would include extensive social distancing guidelines and procedures for the athletes and coaches in attendance.

On August 28, the ISU removed the maximum entry limit of skaters or teams per country.

=== Competitions ===
The series was intended to include the following events this season. However, all but two competitions were ultimately cancelled.

On May 16, the ISU announced that the Slovak Figure Skating Association had cancelled the 2020 Nepela Memorial. As of May 26, the event schedule announced for the 2020 Asian Open Trophy had been withdrawn. On August 20, the Finnish Figure Skating Association cancelled the 2020 Finlandia Trophy. On September 1, the 2020 Denis Ten Memorial Challenge was cancelled. On November 3, Skate Austria cancelled the 2020 Cup of Tyrol. On November 6, the ice dance portion of the 2020 Warsaw Cup was cancelled, and on November 10, the Polish Figure Skating Association cancelled the Warsaw Cup entirely. On February 13, the 2020 Autumn Classic International, originally described as having been "postponed", was removed from the official Skate Canada calendar.

Date	Event	Location	Notes	Ref.
September 9–13	(China) 2020 Asian Open Trophy	Cancelled		
September 16–19	(Slovakia) 2020 Nepela Memorial	Cancelled		
September 17–19	(Canada) 2020 Autumn Classic International	Cancelled		
September 23–26	(Germany) 2020 Nebelhorn Trophy	Oberstdorf, Germany		Details
October 8–11	(Finland) 2020 Finlandia Trophy	Cancelled		
October 15–17	(Hungary) 2020 Budapest Trophy	Budapest, Hungary	No pairs	Details
October 29 – November 1	(Kazakhstan) 2020 Denis Ten Memorial Challenge	Cancelled		
November 12–15	(Poland) 2020 Warsaw Cup	Cancelled		
November 25–28	(Austria) 2020 Cup of Tyrol	Cancelled		
December 2–5	(Croatia) 2020 Golden Spin of Zagreb	Cancelled		

== Medal summary ==
=== Men's singles ===
Competition	Gold	Silver	Bronze	Results
(Germany) Nebelhorn Trophy	(Latvia) Deniss Vasiļjevs	(Italy) Gabriele Frangipani	(Sweden) Nikolaj Majorov	Details
(Hungary) Budapest Trophy	(Italy) Daniel Grassl	(Turkey) Burak Demirboğa	(Estonia) Aleksandr Selevko	Details

=== Ladies’ singles ===
Competition	Gold	Silver	Bronze	Results
(Germany) Nebelhorn Trophy	(Estonia) Eva-Lotta Kiibus	(Switzerland) Alexia Paganini	(Finland) Jenni Saarinen	Details
(Hungary) Budapest Trophy	(Belgium) Loena Hendrickx	(Estonia) Eva-Lotta Kiibus	(Bulgaria) Alexandra Feigin	Details

=== Pairs ===
Competition	Gold	Silver	Bronze	Results
(Germany) Nebelhorn Trophy	(Italy) Rebecca Ghilardi / Filippo Ambrosini	(Germany) Annika Hocke / Robert Kunkel	(France) Cléo Hamon / Denys Strekalin	Details

=== Ice dance ===
Competition	Gold	Silver	Bronze	Results
(Germany) Nebelhorn Trophy	(Czech Republic) Natálie Taschlerová / Filip Taschler	(United Kingdom) Sasha Fear / George Waddell	(Ukraine) Darya Popova / Volodymyr Byelikov	Details
(Hungary) Budapest Trophy	(Ukraine) Alexandra Nazarova / Maxim Nikitin	(Germany) Katharina Müller / Tim Dieck	(United Kingdom) Sasha Fear / George Waddell	Details

=== Medal standings ===
Rank	Nation	Gold	Silver	Bronze	Total
1	Italy	2	1	0	3
2	Estonia	1	1	1	3
3	Ukraine	1	0	1	2
4	Belgium	1	0	0	1
4	Czech Republic	1	0	0	1
4	Latvia	1	0	0	1
7	Germany	0	2	0	2
8	Great Britain	0	1	1	2
9	Switzerland	0	1	0	1
9	Turkey	0	1	0	1
11	Bulgaria	0	0	1	1
11	Finland	0	0	1	1
11	France	0	0	1	1
11	Sweden	0	0	1	1
Totals (14 entries)		7	7	7	21

== Challenger Series rankings ==
Out of fairness to skaters impacted by travel restrictions imposed by the COVID-19 pandemic, the ISU Council decided there would be no Challenger Series ranking this season.

== Top scores ==
=== Men's singles ===
Top 5 best scores in the men's combined total
No.	Skater	Nation	Score	Event
1	Deniss Vasiļjevs	Latvia	233.08	2020 Nebelhorn Trophy
2	Daniel Grassl	Italy	233.04	2020 Budapest Trophy
3	Gabriele Frangipani	Italy	231.65	2020 Nebelhorn Trophy
4	Nikolaj Majorov	Sweden	218.07	2020 Nebelhorn Trophy
5	Maurizio Zandron	Austria	217.65	2020 Nebelhorn Trophy

Top 5 best scores in the men's short program
No.	Skater	Nation	Score	Event
1	Daniel Grassl	Italy	82.27	2020 Budapest Trophy
2	Paul Fentz	Germany	81.86	2020 Nebelhorn Trophy
3	Gabriele Frangipani	Italy	79.13	2020 Nebelhorn Trophy
4	Matteo Rizzo	Italy	77.15	2020 Nebelhorn Trophy
5	Maurizio Zandron	Austria	74.61	2020 Nebelhorn Trophy

Top 5 best scores in the men's free skating
No.	Skater	Nation	Score	Event
1	Deniss Vasiļjevs	Latvia	159.83	2020 Nebelhorn Trophy
2	Gabriele Frangipani	Italy	152.52	2020 Nebelhorn Trophy
3	Daniel Grassl	Italy	150.77	2020 Budapest Trophy
4	Nikolaj Majorov	Sweden	145.53	2020 Nebelhorn Trophy
5	Lukas Britschgi	Switzerland	143.53	2020 Nebelhorn Trophy

=== Ladies' singles ===
Top 5 best scores in the ladies' combined total
No.	Skater	Nation	Score	Event
1	Loena Hendrickx	Belgium	198.87	2020 Budapest Trophy
2	Eva-Lotta Kiibus	Estonia	184.27	2020 Budapest Trophy
3	Alexandra Feigin	Bulgaria	172.68	2020 Budapest Trophy
4	Alexia Paganini	Switzerland	168.85	2020 Nebelhorn Trophy
5	Júlia Láng	Hungary	166.55	2020 Budapest Trophy

Top 5 best scores in the ladies' short program
No.	Skater	Nation	Score	Event
1	Loena Hendrickx	Belgium	72.18	2020 Budapest Trophy
2	Eva-Lotta Kiibus	Estonia	65.37	2020 Budapest Trophy
3	Alexia Paganini	Switzerland	63.60	2020 Nebelhorn Trophy
4	Nicole Schott	Germany	61.21	2020 Nebelhorn Trophy
5	Alexandra Feigin	Bulgaria	60.90	2020 Budapest Trophy

Top 5 best scores in the ladies' free skating
No.	Skater	Nation	Score	Event
1	Loena Hendrickx	Belgium	126.69	2020 Budapest Trophy
2	Eva-Lotta Kiibus	Estonia	118.90	2020 Budapest Trophy
3	Alexandra Feigin	Bulgaria	111.78	2020 Budapest Trophy
4	Júlia Láng	Hungary	108.35	2020 Budapest Trophy
5	Jenni Saarinen	Finland	106.62	2020 Nebelhorn Trophy

=== Pairs ===
Top 5 best scores in the pairs' combined total
No.	Team	Nation	Score	Event
1	Rebecca Ghilardi / Filippo Ambrosini	Italy	154.61	2020 Nebelhorn Trophy
2	Annika Hocke / Robert Kunkel	Germany	154.26	2020 Nebelhorn Trophy
3	Cléo Hamon / Denys Strekalin	France	144.06	2020 Nebelhorn Trophy
4	Elizaveta Zhuk / Martin Bidař	Czech Republic	143.03	2020 Nebelhorn Trophy
5	Coline Keriven / Noël-Antoine Pierre	France	130.27	2020 Nebelhorn Trophy

Top 5 best scores in the pairs' short program
No.	Team	Nation	Score	Event
1	Minerva Fabienne Hase / Nolan Seegert	Germany	63.97	2020 Nebelhorn Trophy
2	Annika Hocke / Robert Kunkel	Germany	60.55	2020 Nebelhorn Trophy
3	Rebecca Ghilardi / Filippo Ambrosini	Italy	58.32	2020 Nebelhorn Trophy
4	Cléo Hamon / Denys Strekalin	France	51.27	2020 Nebelhorn Trophy
5	Elizaveta Zhuk / Martin Bidař	Czech Republic	51.20	2020 Nebelhorn Trophy

Top 5 best scores in the pairs' free skating
No.	Team	Nation	Score	Event
1	Rebecca Ghilardi / Filippo Ambrosini	Italy	96.29	2020 Nebelhorn Trophy
2	Annika Hocke / Robert Kunkel	Germany	93.71	2020 Nebelhorn Trophy
3	Cléo Hamon / Denys Strekalin	France	92.79	2020 Nebelhorn Trophy
4	Elizaveta Zhuk / Martin Bidař	Czech Republic	91.83	2020 Nebelhorn Trophy
5	Coline Keriven / Noël-Antoine Pierre	France	88.26	2020 Nebelhorn Trophy

=== Ice dance ===
Top 5 best scores in the combined total (ice dance)
No.	Team	Nation	Score	Event
1	Alexandra Nazarova / Maxim Nikitin	Ukraine	178.97	2020 Budapest Trophy
2	Katharina Müller / Tim Dieck	Germany	164.99	2020 Budapest Trophy
3	Natálie Taschlerová / Filip Taschler	Czech Republic	163.62	2020 Nebelhorn Trophy
4	Sasha Fear / George Waddell	Great Britain	152.34	2020 Budapest Trophy
5	Darya Popova / Volodymyr Byelikov	Ukraine	148.60	2020 Nebelhorn Trophy

Top 5 best scores in the rhythm dance
No.	Team	Nation	Score	Event
1	Alexandra Nazarova / Maxim Nikitin	Ukraine	71.75	2020 Budapest Trophy
2	Natálie Taschlerová / Filip Taschler	Czech Republic	64.28	2020 Nebelhorn Trophy
3	Sasha Fear / George Waddell	Great Britain	62.69	2020 Budapest Trophy
4	Katharina Müller / Tim Dieck	Germany	62.23	2020 Budapest Trophy
5	Darya Popova / Volodymyr Byelikov	Ukraine	61.55	2020 Nebelhorn Trophy

Top 5 best scores in the free dance
No.	Team	Nation	Score	Event
1	Alexandra Nazarova / Maxim Nikitin	Ukraine	107.22	2020 Budapest Trophy
2	Katharina Müller / Tim Dieck	Germany	102.76	2020 Budapest Trophy
3	Natálie Taschlerová / Filip Taschler	Czech Republic	99.34	2020 Nebelhorn Trophy
4	Sasha Fear / George Waddell	Great Britain	93.29	2020 Nebelhorn Trophy
5	Darya Popova / Volodymyr Byelikov	Ukraine	87.05	2020 Nebelhorn Trophy
