= 2020 CS Nebelhorn Trophy =

Figure skating competition

- Type: ISU Challenger Series
- Date: September 23 – 26
- Season: 2020–21
- Location: Oberstdorf, Germany
- Host: German Ice Skating Union
- Venue: Eissportzentrum Oberstdorf

Champions
- Men's singles: (Latvia) Deniss Vasiļjevs
- Ladies' singles: (Estonia) Eva-Lotta Kiibus
- Pairs: (Italy) Rebecca Ghilardi / Filippo Ambrosini
- Ice dance: (Czech Republic) Natálie Taschlerová / Filip Taschler
- Previous: 2019 CS Nebelhorn Trophy
- Next: Challenger series: 2020 CS Budapest Trophy; Nebelhorn 2021 CS Nebelhorn Trophy

The 2020 CS Nebelhorn Trophy was held in September 2020 in Oberstdorf, Germany. It was part of the 2020–21 ISU Challenger Series. Medals were awarded in the disciplines of men's singles, ladies' singles, pair skating, and ice dance.

On August 25, 2020, the German Ice Skating Union confirmed that Nebelhorn Trophy would be held as scheduled, but without spectators and would include extensive social distancing guidelines and procedures for the athletes and coaches in attendance. Originally scheduled as the fourth event in the 2020–21 Challenger Series, Nebelhorn Trophy became the first to officially proceed as scheduled, after cancellations and postponements of the preceding events due to the COVID-19 pandemic.

Filipino ladies' singles skater Alisson Krystle Perticheto, whose hometown is in Switzerland, was the only skater on the preliminary entry lists to represent a non-European nation.

== Entries ==
The International Skating Union published the list of entries on September 1, 2020.

Country	Men	Ladies	Pairs	Ice dance
Austria	Maurizio Zandron	Natalie Klotz; Olga Mikutina; Stefanie Pesendorfer		
Czech Republic		Eliška Březinová	Elizaveta Zhuk / Martin Bidař	Natálie Taschlerová / Filip Taschler
Denmark		Maia Sørensen		
Estonia	Aleksandr Selevko; Mihhail Selevko	Eva-Lotta Kiibus		
Finland	Valtter Virtanen	Jenni Saarinen		
France			Cléo Hamon / Denys Strekalin; Coline Keriven / Noël-Antoine Pierre	Natacha Lagouge / Arnaud Caffa
Germany	Paul Fentz; Kai Jagoda; Thomas Stoll	Aya Hatakawa; Kristina Isaev; Nicole Schott; Nathalie Weinzierl	Minerva Fabienne Hase / Nolan Seegert; Annika Hocke / Robert Kunkel	Jennifer Janse van Rensburg / Benjamin Steffan
Great Britain	Graham Newberry	Kristen Spours		Sasha Fear / George Waddell
Italy	Gabriele Frangipani; Matteo Rizzo		Rebecca Ghilardi / Filippo Ambrosini	
Latvia	Deniss Vasiļjevs			
Lithuania		Greta Morkytė		
Netherlands		Lindsay van Zundert		Hanna Jakucs / Alessio Galli
Slovakia		Alexandra Michaela Filcová		
Sweden	Nikolaj Majorov	Cassandra Johansson; Josefin Taljegård		
Switzerland	Noah Bodenstein; Lukas Britschgi; Nurullah Sahaka	Noémie Bodenstein; Anna La Porta; Alexia Paganini		Arianna Wróblewska / Stéphane Walker
Turkey	Burak Demirboğa	Güzide Irmak Bayır; Sinem Pekder		
Ukraine	Ivan Shmuratko			Darya Popova / Volodymyr Byelikov

=== Changes to preliminary assignments ===
Date	Discipline	Withdrew	Added	Notes	Refs
September 3	Ladies	(Hungary) Regina Schermann	(Belgium) Loena Hendrickx		
September 10	Ladies	(Estonia) Gerli Liinamäe	—N/a		
September 10	Men	(Norway) Sondre Oddvoll Bøe	—N/a		
September 10	Pairs	—N/a	(France) Cléo Hamon / Denys Strekalin		
September 10	Pairs	—N/a	(France) Coline Keriven / Noël-Antoine Pierre		
September 14	Ladies	(Germany) Lea Johanna Dastich	(Germany) Nathalie Weinzierl		
September 14	Ladies	(Germany) Nargiz Süleymanova	—N/a		
September 16	Ladies	(Philippines) Alisson Krystle Perticheto	—N/a		
September 18	Men	(Czech Republic) Jiří Bělohradský	—N/a		
September 18	Ladies	(Austria) Dorotea Partonjic	—N/a		
September 18	Ladies	(Belgium) Loena Hendrickx	—N/a		
September 18	Ladies	(Sweden) Anita Östlund	—N/a		
September 19	Ladies	(Hungary) Júlia Láng	—N/a	COVID-19 restrictions	
September 19	Ladies	(Hungary) Bernadett Szigeti	—N/a	COVID-19 restrictions	

== Results ==
=== Men ===
Rank	Name	Nation	Total points	SP		FS	
1	Deniss Vasiļjevs	Latvia	233.08	5	73.25	1	159.83
2	Gabriele Frangipani	Italy	231.65	2	79.13	2	152.52
3	Nikolaj Majorov	Sweden	218.07	6	72.54	3	145.53
4	Maurizio Zandron	Austria	217.65	4	74.61	5	143.04
5	Matteo Rizzo	Italy	214.14	3	77.15	7	136.99
6	Paul Fentz	Germany	212.25	1	81.86	8	130.39
7	Aleksandr Selevko	Estonia	211.48	8	69.92	6	141.56
8	Lukas Britschgi	Switzerland	210.16	11	66.63	4	143.53
9	Mihhail Selevko	Estonia	193.01	7	71.59	10	121.42
10	Burak Demirboğa	Turkey	189.16	10	66.70	9	122.46
11	Kai Jagoda	Germany	181.49	12	65.32	12	116.17
12	Ivan Shmuratko	Ukraine	179.38	9	69.42	13	109.96
13	Valtter Virtanen	Finland	174.91	15	57.42	11	117.49
14	Graham Newberry	Great Britain	172.61	13	62.84	14	109.77
15	Nurullah Sahaka	Switzerland	167.28	14	60.92	15	106.36
16	Noah Bodenstein	Switzerland	158.21	16	53.62	16	104.59
17	Thomas Stoll	Germany	151.40	17	51.80	17	99.60

=== Ladies ===
Rank	Name	Nation	Total points	SP		FS	
1	Eva-Lotta Kiibus	Estonia	173.53	3	60.49	1	113.04
2	Alexia Paganini	Switzerland	168.85	1	63.60	3	105.25
3	Jenni Saarinen	Finland	163.87	4	57.25	2	106.62
4	Nicole Schott	Germany	156.27	2	61.21	8	95.06
5	Josefin Taljegård	Sweden	151.54	5	56.19	7	95.35
6	Nathalie Weinzierl	Germany	143.01	9	45.72	5	97.29
7	Lindsay van Zundert	Netherlands	141.93	7	51.65	10	90.28
8	Anna La Porta	Switzerland	139.96	10	45.69	9	94.27
9	Eliška Březinová	Czech Republic	139.32	6	51.98	11	87.34
10	Kristina Isaev	Germany	138.91	14	41.26	4	97.65
11	Kristen Spours	Great Britain	134.78	8	49.90	16	84.88
12	Stefanie Pesendorfer	Austria	131.91	20	35.90	6	96.01
13	Olga Mikutina	Austria	129.40	12	44.14	15	85.26
14	Maia Sørensen	Denmark	128.94	11	45.67	17	83.27
15	Alexandra Michaela Filcová	Slovakia	126.77	16	40.40	13	86.37
16	Aya Hatakawa	Germany	125.69	18	38.82	12	86.87
17	Greta Morkytė	Lithuania	124.90	17	39.29	14	85.61
18	Cassandra Johansson	Sweden	124.11	13	43.16	18	80.95
19	Natalie Klotz	Austria	109.06	15	41.12	21	67.94
20	Güzide Irmak Bayır	Turkey	108.83	19	37.50	19	71.33
21	Sinem Pekder	Turkey	104.08	22	35.43	20	68.65
WD	Noémie Bodenstein	Switzerland	withdrew	21	35.77	withdrew from competition	

=== Pairs ===
Rank	Name	Nation	Total points	SP		FS	
1	Rebecca Ghilardi / Filippo Ambrosini	Italy	154.61	3	58.32	1	96.29
2	Annika Hocke / Robert Kunkel	Germany	154.26	2	60.55	2	93.71
3	Cléo Hamon / Denys Strekalin	France	144.06	4	51.27	3	92.79
4	Elizaveta Zhuk / Martin Bidař	Czech Republic	143.03	5	51.20	4	91.83
5	Coline Keriven / Noël-Antoine Pierre	France	130.27	6	42.01	5	88.26
WD	Minerva Fabienne Hase / Nolan Seegert	Germany	withdrew	1	63.97	withdrew from competition	

=== Ice dance ===
Rank	Name	Nation	Total points	RD		FD	
1	Natálie Taschlerová / Filip Taschler	Czech Republic	163.62	1	64.28	1	99.34
2	Sasha Fear / George Waddell	Great Britain	151.43	3	58.14	2	93.29
3	Darya Popova / Volodymyr Byelikov	Ukraine	148.60	2	61.55	3	87.05
4	Natacha Lagouge / Arnaud Caffa	France	143.29	4	57.85	4	85.44
5	Arianna Wróblewska / Stéphane Walker	Switzerland	134.18	5	53.88	5	80.30
6	Hanna Jakucs / Alessio Galli	Netherlands	124.98	6	47.07	6	77.91
