= 2019 CS Golden Spin of Zagreb =

Figure skating competition

- Type: ISU Challenger Series
- Date: December 4 – 7
- Season: 2019–20
- Location: Zagreb, Croatia
- Host: Croatian Skating Federation
- Venue: Dom Sportova

Champions
- Men's singles: (United States) Jason Brown
- Ladies' singles: (Russia) Elizaveta Tuktamysheva
- Pairs: (United States) Ashley Cain-Gribble / Timothy LeDuc
- Ice dance: (Italy) Charlène Guignard / Marco Fabbri
- Previous: 2019 CS Warsaw Cup

The 2019 CS Golden Spin of Zagreb was held in December 2019 in Zagreb, Croatia. It was part of the 2019–20 ISU Challenger Series. Medals were awarded in the disciplines of men's singles, ladies' singles, pair skating, and ice dance.

== Entries ==
The International Skating Union published the list of entries on November 12, 2019.

Country	Men	Ladies	Pairs	Ice dance
Austria	Luc Maierhofer	Stefanie Pesendorfer; Lara Roth		
Azerbaijan	Vladimir Litvintsev	Ekaterina Ryabova		
Belarus	Konstantin Milyukov	Viktoriia Safonova		Emiliya Kalehanova / Uladzislau Palkhouski
Bulgaria	Alexander Zlatkov	Simona Gospodinova		
China		Zhu Yi		
Croatia			Lana Petranović / Antonio Souza-Kordeiru	
Czech Republic	Georgii Reshtenko			
Estonia	Daniel Albert Naurits; Aleksandr Selevko	Eva-Lotta Kiibus		
Finland	Valtter Virtanen			
France	Adam Siao Him Fa	Maia Mazzara	Coline Keriven / Antoine Pierre; Camille Mendoza / Pavel Kovalev	Adelina Galyavieva / Louis Thauron
Georgia	Morisi Kvitelashvili			
Germany	Catalin Dimitrescu; Paul Fentz; Thomas Stoll	Kristina Isaev; Nicole Schott	Minerva Fabienne Hase / Nolan Seegert; Elena Pavlova / Ruben Blommaert	Shari Koch / Christian Nüchtern; Katharina Müller / Tim Dieck; Jennifer Urban / Benjamin Steffan
Hong Kong	Harrison Jon-Yen Wong			
Hungary			Ioulia Chtchetinina / Márk Magyar	Emily Monaghan / Ilias Fourati
Israel	Alexei Bychenko; Mark Gorodnitsky; Daniel Samohin	Nelli Ioffe; Alina Iushchenkova; Taylor Morris	Anna Vernikov / Evgeni Krasnopolski	
Italy	Mattia Dalla Torre; Alessandro Fadini; Gabriele Frangipani	Lucrezia Beccari; Lara Naki Gutmann; Roberta Rodeghiero	Irma Caldara / Marco Santucci; Sara Conti / Niccolò Macii; Rebecca Ghilardi / Filippo Ambrosini	Charlène Guignard / Marco Fabbri; Jasmine Tessari / Francesco Fioretti
Kazakhstan	Rakhat Bralin; Nikita Manko	Aiza Mambekova		
Latvia				Aurelija Ipolito / J.T. Michel
Liechtenstein		Romana Kaiser		
Mexico	Donovan Carrillo	Andrea Montesinos Cantú		
Netherlands		Linden van Bemmel; Kyarha van Tiel; Niki Wories	Daria Danilova / Michel Tsiba	
Philippines	Yamato Rowe		Isabella Gamez / David-Alexandre Paradis	
Russia	Artur Danielian; Makar Ignatov	Sofia Samodurova; Elizaveta Tuktamysheva	Karina Akapova / Maksim Shagalov; Ksenia Stolbova / Andrei Novoselov	Annabelle Morozov / Andrei Bagin
Serbia		Antonina Dubinina		
Slovenia		Daša Grm		
South Africa			Eloise Papka / Johann Wilkinson	
Spain			Laura Barquero / Tòn Cónsul; Dorota Broda / Pedro Betegon Martin	
Switzerland			Alexandra Herbríková / Nicolas Roulet	
Ukraine			Sofiia Nesterova / Artem Darenskyi	Darya Popova / Volodymyr Byelikov
United Kingdom				Robynne Tweedale / Joseph Buckland
United States	Jason Brown; Alexei Krasnozhon; Camden Pulkinen		Ashley Cain-Gribble / Timothy LeDuc; Tarah Kayne / Danny O'Shea; Olivia Serafini / Mervin Tran	Caroline Green / Michael Parsons; Lorraine McNamara / Quinn Carpenter

=== Changes to preliminary assignments ===
Date	Discipline	Withdrew	Added	Reason/Other notes	Refs
November 13	Ice dance	N/A	(United Kingdom) Robynne Tweedale / Joseph Buckland		
November 14	Men	(Germany) Kai Jagoda	(Germany) Paul Fentz		
November 14	Ladies	(Peru) Andrea Pekarek	(Netherlands) Linden van Bemmel		
November 14	Ladies	N/A	(Netherlands) Kyarha van Tiel		
November 19	Pairs	(Belarus) Ekaterina Iurova / Vladyslav Gresko			
November 19	Pairs	(Russia) Alisa Efimova / Alexander Korovin	(Russia) Ksenia Stolbova / Andrei Novoselov		
November 19	Ice dance	(Russia) Sofia Evdokimova / Egor Bazin	(Russia) Betina Popova / Sergey Mozgov		
November 20	Ladies	(Croatia) Hana Cvijanović			
November 20	Ladies	(Spain) Valentina Matos			
November 21	Ladies	(Russia) Stanislava Konstantinova			
November 22	Ladies	(Germany) Nathalie Weinzierl	(Germany) Kristina Isaev		
November 25	Men	(Russia) Dmitri Aliev	(Russia) Andrei Lazukin	Event conflict	
November 25	Ladies	(Germany) Lea Johanna Dastich		Ankle injury	
November 25	Ladies	(Italy) Marina Piredda	(Italy) Lucrezia Beccari		
November 25	Pairs	N/A	(Russia) Lina Kudriavtseva / Ilia Spiridonov		
November 26	Men	(Chinese Taipei) Lin Fang-yi			
November 26	Men	(Chinese Taipei) Tsao Chih-i			
November 26	Ladies	(United States) Bradie Tennell		Event conflict	
November 26	Pairs	(Italy) Vivienne Contarino / Marco Pauletti	(Italy) Irma Caldara / Marco Santucci		
November 26	Ice dance	(Czech Republic) Natálie Taschlerová / Filip Taschler			
November 27	Men	(Russia) Andrei Lazukin			
November 27	Ladies	(Ukraine) Anastasiia Arkhipova		Knee injury	
November 27	Ice dance	(Russia) Ksenia Konkina / Pavel Drozd			
November 27	Ice dance	(Russia) Betina Popova / Sergey Mozgov			
November 28	Ladies	(Hong Kong) Cheuk Ka Kahlen Cheung			
December 2	Ladies	(India) Tara Prasad			
December 2	Ladies	(Serbia) Leona Rogic			
December 2	Ladies	(United States) Hanna Harrell			
December 2	Pairs	(Austria) Miriam Ziegler / Severin Kiefer			
December 2	Pairs	(Russia) Lina Kudriavtseva / Ilia Spiridonov			
December 2	Pairs	(United States) Alexa Scimeca Knierim / Chris Knierim	(United States) Olivia Serafini / Mervin Tran		

== Results ==
=== Men ===
Rank	Name	Nation	Total points	SP		FS	
1	Jason Brown	United States	242.39	3	79.44	1	162.95
2	Morisi Kvitelashvili	Georgia	236.65	2	81.10	4	155.55
3	Makar Ignatov	Russia	229.22	8	72.66	2	156.56
4	Artur Danielian	Russia	227.41	10	71.50	3	155.91
5	Aleksandr Selevko	Estonia	221.94	4	76.18	5	145.76
6	Camden Pulkinen	United States	219.57	5	76.04	7	143.53
7	Adam Siao Him Fa	France	213.98	13	69.06	6	144.92
8	Alexei Bychenko	Israel	213.13	1	81.31	10	131.82
9	Alexei Krasnozhon	United States	212.51	7	73.26	8	139.25
10	Daniel Albert Naurits	Estonia	203.89	12	69.67	9	134.22
11	Gabriele Frangipani	Italy	201.47	9	72.06	12	129.41
12	Mark Gorodnitsky	Israel	200.71	6	74.61	14	126.10
13	Konstantin Milyukov	Belarus	195.63	18	65.88	11	129.75
14	Paul Fentz	Germany	194.48	15	66.81	13	127.67
15	Daniel Samohin	Israel	187.35	11	71.45	20	115.90
16	Vladimir Litvintsev	Azerbaijan	185.12	14	68.47	19	116.65
17	Donovan Carrillo	Mexico	183.87	17	66.59	18	117.28
18	Georgii Reshtenko	Czech Republic	183.61	21	59.63	15	123.98
19	Alessandro Fadini	Italy	179.62	22	58.44	16	121.18
20	Catalin Dimitrescu	Germany	177.51	16	66.71	23	110.80
21	Alexander Zlatkov	Bulgaria	175.96	20	63.30	22	112.66
22	Mattia Dalla Torre	Italy	167.63	26	54.28	21	113.35
23	Rakhat Bralin	Kazakhstan	167.29	28	49.77	17	117.52
24	Harrison Jon-Yen Wong	Hong Kong	162.63	24	54.94	24	107.69
25	Valtter Virtanen	Finland	150.38	27	51.13	25	99.25
26	Yamato Rowe	Philippines	134.99	29	49.05	26	85.94
WD	Luc Maierhofer	Austria	withdrew	19	65.18	withdrew from competition	
WD	Thomas Stoll	Germany	withdrew	23	55.75	withdrew from competition	
WD	Nikita Manko	Kazakhstan	withdrew	25	54.91	withdrew from competition	

=== Ladies ===
Rank	Name	Nation	Total points	SP		FS	
1	Elizaveta Tuktamysheva	Russia	221.15	1	72.86	1	148.29
2	Viktoriia Safonova	Belarus	192.49	2	64.35	2	128.14
3	Nicole Schott	Germany	182.71	3	61.78	4	120.93
4	Sofia Samodurova	Russia	180.61	4	59.57	3	121.04
5	Ekaterina Ryabova	Azerbaijan	176.51	6	57.02	5	119.49
6	Lara Naki Gutmann	Italy	167.60	7	56.81	7	110.79
7	Lucrezia Beccari	Italy	167.17	9	53.83	6	113.34
8	Daša Grm	Slovenia	158.39	5	58.91	11	99.48
9	Maia Mazzara	France	152.25	20	45.94	8	106.31
10	Roberta Rodeghiero	Italy	151.11	11	49.85	10	101.26
11	Eva-Lotta Kiibus	Estonia	148.66	18	46.20	9	102.46
12	Niki Wories	Netherlands	147.69	8	55.12	14	92.57
13	Kyarha van Tiel	Netherlands	147.44	10	51.05	12	96.39
14	Zhu Yi	China	143.10	13	49.23	13	93.87
15	Stefanie Pesendorfer	Austria	139.06	12	49.64	16	89.42
16	Kristina Isaev	Germany	138.14	19	46.11	15	92.03
17	Antonina Dubinina	Serbia	134.58	15	48.22	18	86.36
18	Aiza Mambekova	Kazakhstan	132.52	14	48.50	19	84.02
19	Nelli Ioffe	Israel	128.53	16	47.82	20	80.71
20	Andrea Montesinos Cantú	Mexico	127.45	22	40.96	17	86.49
21	Taylor Morris	Israel	119.51	21	43.13	21	76.38
22	Simona Gospodinova	Bulgaria	111.05	23	38.23	22	72.82
23	Alina Iushchenkova	Israel	108.97	24	36.23	23	72.74
24	Linden van Bemmel	Netherlands	101.14	25	36.02	24	65.12
WD	Lara Roth	Austria	withdrew	17	47.11	withdrew from competition	
WD	Romana Kaiser	Liechtenstein	withdrew	withdrew from competition			

=== Pairs ===
Rank	Name	Nation	Total points	SP		FS	
1	Ashley Cain-Gribble / Timothy LeDuc	United States	199.43	1	70.83	1	128.60
2	Tarah Kayne / Danny O'Shea	United States	194.29	3	66.20	2	128.09
3	Minerva Fabienne Hase / Nolan Seegert	Germany	185.09	2	68.30	3	116.79
4	Karina Akapova / Maksim Shagalov	Russia	175.49	4	60.29	4	115.20
5	Ioulia Chtchetinina / Márk Magyar	Hungary	158.87	6	55.27	7	103.60
6	Rebecca Ghilardi / Filippo Ambrosini	Italy	157.28	8	53.10	6	104.18
7	Olivia Serafini / Mervin Tran	United States	155.21	12	48.29	5	106.92
8	Laura Barquero / Tòn Cónsul	Spain	153.83	9	52.22	8	101.61
9	Coline Keriven / Antoine Pierre	France	153.00	7	53.20	10	99.80
10	Elena Pavlova / Ruben Blommaert	Germany	151.81	5	59.40	12	92.41
11	Anna Vernikov / Evgeni Krasnopolski	Israel	150.44	10	49.52	9	100.92
12	Lana Petranović / Antonio Souza-Kordeiru	Croatia	144.73	11	49.46	11	95.27
13	Sara Conti / Niccolò Macii	Italy	136.20	17	45.43	13	90.77
14	Isabella Gamez / David-Alexandre Paradis	Philippines	135.90	14	47.50	15	88.40
15	Daria Danilova / Michel Tsiba	Netherlands	135.71	13	47.86	16	87.85
16	Dorota Broda / Pedro Betegon Martin	Spain	133.32	15	46.67	17	86.65
17	Camille Mendoza / Pavel Kovalev	France	131.03	18	41.66	14	89.37
18	Alexandra Herbríková / Nicolas Roulet	Switzerland	121.84	19	40.53	18	81.31
19	Sofiia Nesterova / Artem Darenskyi	Ukraine	119.75	16	45.44	19	74.31
20	Irma Caldara / Marco Santucci	Italy	108.12	20	37.49	20	70.63
21	Eloise Papka / Johann Wilkinson	South Africa	98.03	21	34.59	21	63.44
WD	Ksenia Stolbova / Andrei Novoselov	Russia	withdrew	withdrew from competition			

=== Ice dance ===
Rank	Name	Nation	Total points	SP		FS	
1	Charlène Guignard / Marco Fabbri	Italy	202.18	1	83.31	1	118.87
2	Annabelle Morozov / Andrei Bagin	Russia	191.71	2	78.75	2	112.96
3	Caroline Green / Michael Parsons	United States	187.10	4	74.18	3	112.92
4	Lorraine McNamara / Quinn Carpenter	United States	183.47	3	78.39	5	105.08
5	Jennifer Urban / Benjamin Steffan	Germany	171.87	6	66.10	4	105.77
6	Katharina Müller / Tim Dieck	Germany	169.59	8	64.70	6	104.89
7	Jasmine Tessari / Francesco Fioretti	Italy	165.48	5	68.63	7	96.85
8	Shari Koch / Christian Nüchtern	Germany	156.26	9	63.45	8	92.81
9	Robynne Tweedale / Joseph Buckland	United Kingdom	152.93	7	65.19	10	87.74
10	Darya Popova / Volodymyr Byelikov	Ukraine	147.00	10	60.68	11	86.32
11	Emiliya Kalehanova / Uladzislau Palkhouski	Belarus	145.88	11	57.45	9	88.43
12	Emily Monaghan / Ilias Fourati	Hungary	136.79	12	53.37	12	83.42
WD	Adelina Galyavieva / Louis Thauron	France	withdrew	withdrew from competition			
WD	Aurelija Ipolito / J.T. Michel	Latvia	withdrew	withdrew from competition			
