= George Waddell (figure skater) =

British ice dancer

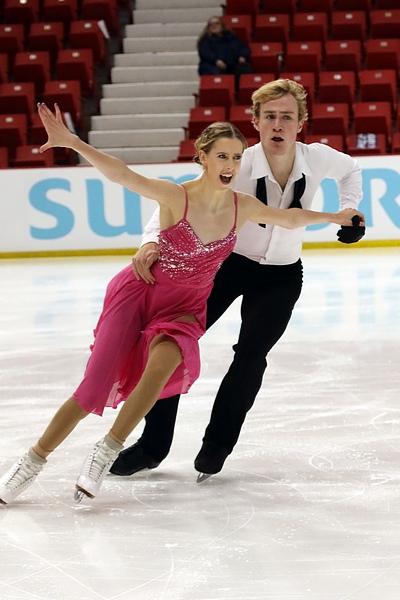
- Fear/Waddell at 2019 JGP United States

Personal information
- Born: 17 October 1998 (age 27) Toronto, Ontario, Canada
- Home town: London, England, UK
- Height: 1.85 m (6 ft 1 in)

Figure skating career
- Country: Great Britain
- Partner: Sasha Fear
- Coach: Romain Haguenauer; Karen Quinn
- Skating club: Alexandra Palace London
- Began skating: 2000

George Waddell (born 17 October 1998) is a British-Canadian ice dancer. With his skating partner, Sasha Fear, he is the 2020 CS Nebelhorn Trophy silver medalist and the 2020 CS Budapest Trophy bronze medalist. On the junior level, he is a two-time British junior national champion (2018, 2019) and has competed in the final segment at the 2019 World Junior Championships.

== Personal life ==
Waddell was born on 17 October 1998 in Toronto, Canada to a Canadian mother and a Scottish father. He has a twin brother, Charles, who was formerly an ice dancer and a younger brother, Bruce, who competes as a singles skater and formerly in ice dance with Natalie D'Alessandro. Waddell is the grandson of NHL hockey star Leonard "Red" Kelly and his uncle Patrick Kelly is an Olympic speed skater. He competed in ice hockey up through 2016. Waddell can play the piano and enjoys darts, bird watching, and line dancing. He was accepted into the Commerce program at Queen's University at Kingston. Waddell holds British, Canadian, and American citizenship. George currently attends Queen’s University for the BCom/JD dual degree.

== Career ==
=== Early career ===
Waddell began skating in 2000 in Toronto, training in both hockey and figure skating. He began learning ice dance under Andrew Hallam at the Toronto Cricket, Skating and Curling Club and had a brief partnership with Kaitlin Stitz in 2012–13. When his twin brother Charles quit skating, he took over skating with Charles' former dance partner, Victoria Oliver, during the 2013–14 season. Waddell/Oliver competed three seasons together, including two appearances at the Canadian Championships. Waddell teamed up with Sabrina Bédard in 2016 and moved to Montreal to train under her coach Romain Haguenauer.

Waddell teamed up with British skater Sasha Fear in May 2017 to represent Great Britain; their families were already acquainted and the partnership tryout was initiated by Haguenauer. He did not have to sit out a year of competition following his nationality transfer, due to having never competed internationally for Canada.

=== 2017–2018 season ===
Fear/Waddell made their international debut at the 2017 Lake Placid Ice Dance International, finishing sixth. They finished seventh and tenth at their Junior Grand Prix assignments in Brisbane, Australia and Minsk, Belarus, respectively. Fear/Waddell won their first international title at the 2017 Leo Scheu Memorial.

Fear/Waddell won the 2018 British junior national title by over 20 points ahead of Emily Rose Brown / James Hernandez and Natalia Paillu Neves / Frank Roselli. At the 2020 World Junior Championships, they finished twenty-first, narrowly missing qualification to the free dance segment.

=== 2018–2019 season ===
Fear/Waddell again opened the season at the 2018 Lake Placid Ice Dance International, finishing eighth. On the 2018–19 ISU Junior Grand Prix, they finished eleventh in Kaunas, Lithuania and ninth in Ostrava, Czech Republic.

Fear/Waddell defended their national title at the 2019 British Championships, winning by over 40 points ahead of Lucy Hancock / Billy Wilson French and Paillu Neves / Roselli. They finished eighteenth at the 2019 World Junior Championships.

=== 2019–2020 season ===
Fear/Waddell opened the season with a pair of eighth-place finishes on the 2019–20 ISU Junior Grand Prix in Lake Placid, New York, United States and Gdańsk, Poland. They won the junior titles at the Mezzaluna Cup and the Pavel Roman Memorial.

Fear/Waddell won silver at the 2020 British Championships, finishing around four points behind Brown / Hernandez. As a result, they missed the World Junior Championships for the first time in their partnership.

=== 2020–2021 season ===
Fear/Waddell made their senior international debut at the 2020 CS Nebelhorn Trophy, which, due to the ongoing COVID-19 pandemic, was attended only by European skaters. They won the silver medal. Attending a second Challenger, the 2020 CS Budapest Trophy, they won the bronze medal. With the British Championships cancelled as a result of the pandemic, Fear/Waddell were named to the British team for the 2021 European Championships. The competition was cancelled on 10 December 2020.

=== 2021–2022 season ===
Fear/Waddell began the season at the Skating Club of Boston-hosted Lake Placid Ice Dance International, where they placed tenth. They next competed at the 2021 CS Nebelhorn Trophy, seeking to qualify a second berth for a British dance team at the 2022 Winter Olympics. They finished eleventh at the event, outside of qualification. They went on to compete at a number of other minor internationals in the fall, finishing fifth at the Budapest Trophy and second at the Viktor Petrenko Cup.

After winning the silver medal at the British championships again, Fear/Waddell were assigned to make their European Championship debut in Tallinn. Qualifying for the free dance, they finished in fifteenth place.

Fear/Waddell concluded the season at the 2022 World Championships, held in Montpellier with Russian dance teams absent due to the International Skating Union banning all Russian athletes due to their country's invasion of Ukraine. Qualifying to the free dance in their World Championship debut, they finished seventeenth.

== Programs ==
=== With Fear ===
Season	Rhythm dance	Free dance
2021–2022	Swing: Another One Bites the Dust; Blues: The Show Must Go On; Swing: Don't Stop Me Now by Queen choreo. by Romain Haguenauer	The Nutcracker by Pyotr Ilyich Tchaikovsky choreo. by Romain Haguenauer
2020–2021	Singin' in the Rain (reprise); Singin' in the Rain (reprise); Overture (from Singin' in the Rain) by Arthur Freed, Nacio Herb Brown, Lennie Hayton choreo. by Romain Haguenauer	An American in Paris; 'S Wonderful; I Got Rhythm by George Gershwin choreo. by Romain Haguenauer
2019–2020	Foxtrot: Singin' in the Rain (reprise); Quickstep: Singin' in the Rain (reprise) (from Singin' in the Rain) by Arthur Freed, Nacio Herb Brown, Lennie Hayton choreo. by Romain Haguenauer	An American in Paris; 'S Wonderful; I Got Rhythm by George Gershwin choreo. by Romain Haguenauer
2018–2019	Tango: Por una cabeza by Carlos Gardel; Tango: Libertango by Astor Piazzolla choreo. by Romain Haguenauer	A Thousand Years by Christina Perri performed by The Piano Guys; Beethoven's Five Secrets by The Piano Guys choreo. by Romain Haguenauer
	Short dance	
2017–2018	Cha Cha: Amor by Ricky Martin; Rhumba: Lo so che finirà by Gigi D'Alessio; Samba: Mujer Latina by Thalía choreo. by Romain Haguenauer	Fix You; Viva la Vida; A Sky Full of Stars by Coldplay choreo. by Romain Haguenauer

== Competitive highlights ==
CS: Challenger Series; JGP: Junior Grand Prix

=== With Fear ===
International
Event	17–18	18–19	19–20	20–21	21–22
Worlds					17th
Europeans				C	15th
CS Budapest				3rd	
CS Nebelhorn				2nd	11th
Budapest Trophy					5th
Lake Placid IDI					10th
Victor Petrenko Cup					2nd
International: Junior
Junior Worlds	21st	18th			
JGP Australia	7th				
JGP Belarus	10th				
JGP Czech Rep.		9th			
JGP Lithuania		11th			
JGP Poland			8th		
JGP USA			8th		
Egna Trophy	4th	3rd			
Golden Spin			WD		
GP Bratislava		4th			
Ice Star		6th	2nd		
Leo Scheu	1st				
Mezzaluna Cup			1st		
Open d'Andorra	5th				
Pavel Roman		3rd	1st		
National
British Champ.	1st J	1st J	2nd J	C	2nd

=== With Bédard ===
National
Event	2016–17
Canadian Champ.	7th J

=== With Oliver ===
National
Event	15–16
Canadian Champ.	14th J
SC Challenge	13th J
