= 2020 CS Budapest Trophy =

International figure skating competition

- Type: ISU Challenger Series
- Date: 15 – 17 October
- Season: 2020–21
- Location: Budapest, Hungary
- Host: Hungarian National Skating Federation
- Venue: Vasas Jégcentrum

Champions
- Men's singles: (Italy) Daniel Grassl
- Ladies' singles: (Belgium) Loena Hendrickx
- Ice dance: (Ukraine) Oleksandra Nazarova and Maksym Nikitin
- Previous CS: 2020 CS Nebelhorn Trophy

The 2020 Budapest Trophy was a figure skating competition sanctioned by the International Skating Union (ISU), organized and hosted by the Hungarian National Skating Federation, and the second of two events of the 2020 Challenger Series. It was the inaugural edition of the Budapest Trophy and took place amidst the COVID-19 pandemic. It was one of only two Challenger Series competitions not cancelled in 2020 due to the pandemic, and was held from 15 to 17 October at the Vasas Jégcentrum in Budapest, Hungary. Medals were awarded in men's singles, women's singles, and ice dance. Daniel Grassl of Italy won the men's event, Loena Hendrickx of Belgium won the women's event, and Oleksandra Nazarova and Maksym Nikitin of Ukraine won the ice dance event.

== Background ==
The ISU Challenger Series was introduced in 2014. It is a series of international figure skating competitions sanctioned by the International Skating Union (ISU) and organized by ISU member nations. The objective is to ensure consistent organization and structure within a series of international competitions linked together, providing opportunities for senior-level skaters to compete at the international level and also earn ISU World Standing points.

The inaugural edition of the Budapest Trophy was intended to be the sixth event of the 2020 Challenger Series, however all but two of the events – the 2020 Nebelhorn Trophy and the 2020 Budapest Trophy – were ultimately cancelled due to the COVID-19 pandemic. On 13 July, the ISU announced that the remaining Challenger Series events would be treated as separate individual competitions rather than part of a series; as a result, no Challenger Series ranking would be determined and no prize money distributed at the end of the series, although skaters could still earn Challenger Series points towards the World Standings and Season's World Ranking. However, the ISU later revised their decision on 3 August, announcing that world ranking points would not be awarded due to the limited nature of the competitions. On 1 October, the Hungarian National Skating Federation released a statement detailing the Hungarian government's COVID-19 regulations for competitors seeking to gain entry to Hungary. The ISU published the initial list of entrants on 2 October.

The 2020 Budapest Trophy was held from 15 to 17 October at the Vasas Jégcentrum. Only 300 spectators were allowed into the arena each day, with temperatures taken prior to admittance and strict requirements for the wearing of face masks.

== Required performance elements ==
=== Single skating ===
Men and women competing in single skating performed their short programs on 15 October. Lasting no more than 2 minutes 40 seconds, the short program had to include the following elements:

For men: one double or triple Axel; one triple or quadruple jump; one jump combination consisting of a double jump and a triple jump, two triple jumps, or a quadruple jump and a double jump or triple jump; one flying spin; one camel spin or sit spin with a change of foot; one spin combination with a change of foot; and a step sequence using the full ice surface.

For women: one double or triple Axel; one triple jump; one jump combination consisting of a double jump and a triple jump, or two triple jumps; one flying spin; one layback spin or sideways leaning spin without a change of foot; one spin combination with a change of foot; and one step sequence using the full ice surface.

Men performed their free skates on 16 October, while women performed theirs on 17 October. The free skate for both men and women could last no more than 4 minutes each, and had to include the following: seven jump elements, of which one had to be an Axel-type jump; three spins, of which one had to be a spin combination, one had to be a flying spin, and one had to be a spin with only one position; a step sequence; and a choreographic sequence.

=== Ice dance ===
Couples competing in ice dance performed their rhythm dances on 16 October. Lasting no more than 2 minutes 50 seconds, the required theme of the rhythm dance this season was music from musicals or operettas, from any of the following rhythms: quickstep, blues, march, polka, foxtrot, swing, Charleston, or waltz. The required pattern dance element was the Finnstep. The rhythm dance had to include the following elements: one section of the Finnstep skated to either the quickstep, Charleston, or swing; one pattern dance type step sequence, one pattern dance in hold or not touching, one short lift, and one set of sequential twizzles.

Couples performed their free dances on 17 October. The free dance performance could last no longer than 4 minutes, and had to include the following: three short lifts or one short lift and one combination lift, one dance spin, one set of synchronized twizzles, one step sequence in hold, one step sequence while on one skate and not touching, and three choreographic elements.

== Judging ==
For the 2020–21 season, all of the technical elements in any figure skating performance – such as jumps, spins, and lifts – were assigned a predetermined base point value and were then scored by a panel of nine judges on a scale from –3 to +3 based on their quality of execution. The judging panel's Grade of Execution (GOE) was determined by calculating the trimmed mean (that is, an average after deleting the highest and lowest scores), and this GOE was added to the base value to come up with the final score for each element. The panel's scores for all elements were added together to generate a total element score. At the same time, judges evaluated each performance based on five program components – skating skills, transitions, performance, composition, and interpretation of the music/timing – and assigned a score from .25 to 10 in .25 point increments. The judging panel's final score for each program component was also determined by calculating the trimmed mean. Those scores were then multiplied by the factor shown on the following chart; the results were added together to generate a total program component score.

Program component factoring
Discipline	Short program or Rhythm dance	Free skate or Free dance
Men	1.00	2.00
Women	0.80	1.60
Ice dance	0.80	1.20

Deductions were applied for certain violations like time infractions, stops and restarts, or falls. The total element score and total program component score were added together, minus any deductions, to generate a final performance score for each skater or team.

== Medalists ==
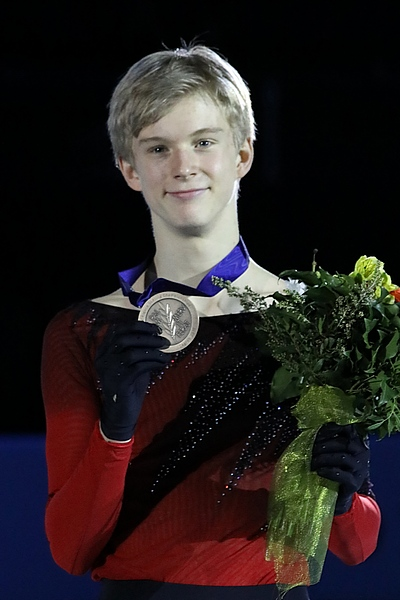
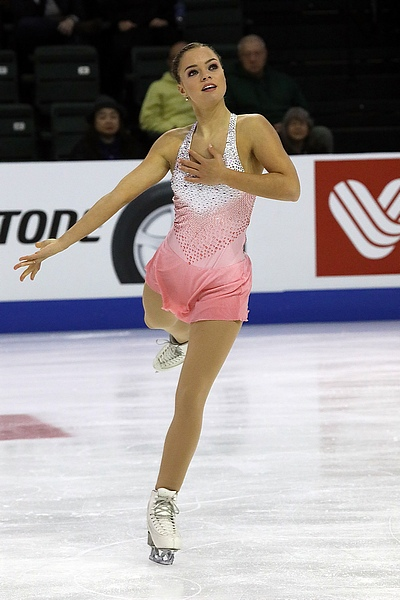
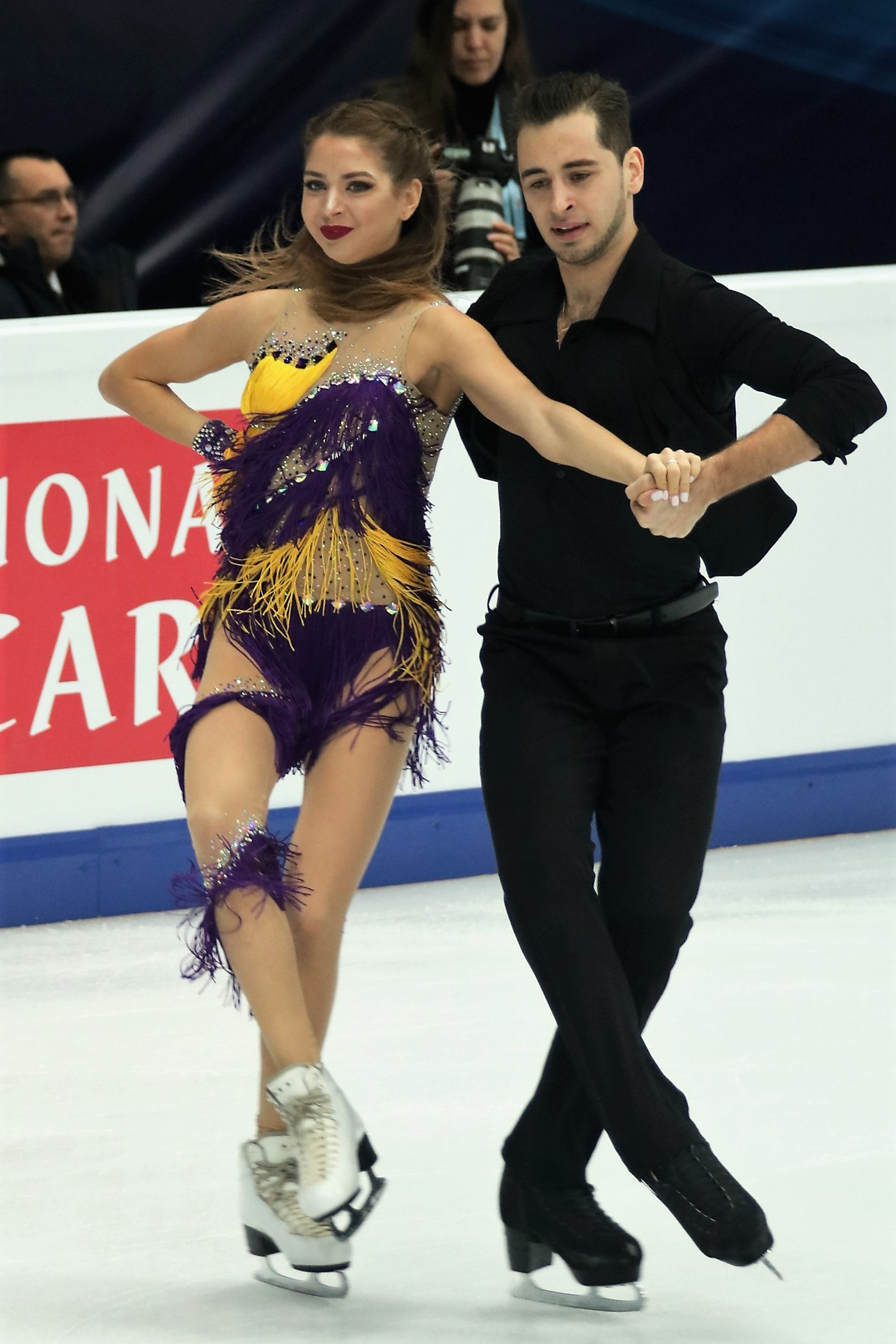
The 2020 Budapest Trophy champions: Daniel Grassl of Italy (men's singles), Loena Hendrickx of Belgium (women's singles), and Oleksandra Nazarova and Maksym Nikitin of Ukraine (ice dance)

Medalists
Discipline	Gold	Silver	Bronze
Men	(Italy) Daniel Grassl	(Turkey) Burak Demirboğa	(Estonia) Aleksandr Selevko
Women	(Belgium) Loena Hendrickx	(Estonia) Eva-Lotta Kiibus	(Bulgaria) Alexandra Feigin
Ice dance	(Ukraine); Oleksandra Nazarova; Maksym Nikitin	(Germany); Katharina Müller; Tim Dieck	(United Kingdom); Sasha Fear; George Waddell

== Results ==
=== Men's singles ===
Men's results
Rank	Skater	Nation	Total points	SP		FS	
1st place, gold medalist(s)	Daniel Grassl	Italy	233.04	1	82.27	1	150.77
2nd place, silver medalist(s)	Burak Demirboğa	Turkey	213.39	4	70.89	2	142.50
3rd place, bronze medalist(s)	Aleksandr Selevko	Estonia	204.88	3	71.55	5	133.33
4	Başar Oktar	Turkey	202.17	5	68.16	4	134.01
5	Maurizio Zandron	Austria	200.80	2	71.78	6	129.02
6	Ivan Shmuratko	Ukraine	200.74	6	60.14	3	140.60
7	Jari Kessler	Croatia	176.13	7	59.06	8	117.07
8	Larry Loupolover	Bulgaria	173.39	9	54.92	7	118.47
9	András Csernoch	Hungary	171.46	8	56.88	9	114.58
10	Máté Böröcz	Hungary	123.60	11	44.88	10	78.72
11	Marco Klepoch	Slovakia	110.39	10	45.72	11	64.67

=== Women's singles ===
Women's results
Rank	Skater	Nation	Total points	SP		FS	
1st place, gold medalist(s)	Loena Hendrickx	Belgium	198.87	1	72.18	1	126.69
2nd place, silver medalist(s)	Eva-Lotta Kiibus	Estonia	184.27	2	65.37	2	118.90
3rd place, bronze medalist(s)	Alexandra Feigin	Bulgaria	172.68	3	60.90	3	111.78
4	Júlia Láng	Hungary	166.55	4	58.20	4	108.35
5	Daša Grm	Slovenia	152.07	5	53.75	6	98.32
6	Ivett Tóth	Hungary	146.66	6	48.83	7	97.83
7	Emilea Zingas	Cyprus	144.21	7	46.86	8	97.75
8	Regina Schermann	Hungary	143.48	9	46.49	9	96.99
9	Kristina Škuleta-Gromova	Estonia	141.56	11	42.36	5	99.20
10	Güzide Irmak Bayır	Turkey	127.62	10	42.78	10	84.84
11	Antonina Dubinina	Serbia	124.01	8	46.56	12	77.45
12	Marilena Kitromilis	Cyprus	116.30	14	33.10	11	83.20
13	Sinem Pekder	Turkey	115.33	12	42.24	13	73.09
WD	Natalie Klotz	Austria	Withdrew	13	40.55	Withdrew from competition	

=== Ice dance ===
Ice dance results
Rank	Skater	Nation	Total points	RD		FD	
1st place, gold medalist(s)	Oleksandra Nazarova; Maksym Nikitin	Ukraine	178.97	1	71.75	1	107.22
2nd place, silver medalist(s)	Katharina Müller; Tim Dieck	Germany	164.99	3	62.23	2	102.76
3rd place, bronze medalist(s)	Sasha Fear; George Waddell	Great Britain	152.34	2	62.69	3	89.65

== Works cited ==
- "Special Regulations & Technical Rules – Single & Pair Skating and Ice Dance 2018". International Skating Union. Archived from the original on 17 August 2020.
