= Taylor Morris (figure skater) =

Israeli figure skater

Personal information
- Native name: טיילור מוריס
- Born: July 1, 2000 (age 26) Highland Park, Illinois
- Home town: Colorado Springs, Colorado
- Height: 1.57 m (5 ft 2 in)

Figure skating career
- Country: Israel
- Coach: Damon Allen; Erik Schulz; Christy Krall
- Skating club: Israel ISF
- Began skating: 2003

Taylor Morris (Hebrew: טיילור מוריס; born 1 July 2000) is an American-Israeli figure skater who represents Israel in women's singles. She is the 2021 Israeli national champion and the 2019 Israeli national bronze medalist.

== Programs ==
Season	Short program	Free skating
2021–2022	Never Tear Us Apart performed by Paloma Faith	Light of the Seven by Ramin Djawadi; The Storm by Balázs Havasi

== Competitive highlights ==
International
Event	19–20	20–21	21–22
Europeans			29th
CS Golden Spin	21st		13th
CS Nebelhorn	14th		13th
CS U.S. Classic	8th		
CS Denis Ten MC			WD
CS Warsaw Cup			18th
Bavarian Open	9th		7th
Bellu Memorial			3rd
Challenge Cup		15th	
Jégvirág Cup	5th		
Philadelphia	11th		
Volvo Open Cup	25th		
Toruń Cup	9th		
U.S. Classic			6th
National
Israeli Champ.	3rd		1st

== Detailed results ==
2021–22 season
Date	Event	SP	FS	Total
January 10–16, 2022	2022 European Championships	30; 46.60	-	30; 46.60
December 7–11, 2021	2021 CS Golden Spin of Zagreb	15; 45.14	12; 94.10	13; 139.24
November 17–20, 2021	2021 CS Warsaw Cup	21; 44.67	17; 96.10	18; 140.77
September 22–25, 2021	2021 CS Nebelhorn Trophy	10; 53.36	16; 94.98	13; 148.34
September 15–18, 2021	2021 U.S. International Figure Skating Classic	6; 49.09	6; 93.07	6; 142.16
2019–20 season
Date	Event	SP	FS	Total
February 14–16, 2020	2020 Jégvirág Cup	5; 34.70	5; 71.10	5; 105.80
February 3–9, 2020	2020 Bavarian Open	8; 51.05	9; 95.05	9; 146.10
December 4–7, 2019	2019 CS Golden Spin of Zagreb	21; 43.13	21; 76.38	21; 119.51
November 6–10, 2019	2019 Volvo Open Cup	25; 38.33	24; 66.83	25; 105.16
September 25–28, 2019	2019 CS Nebelhorn Trophy	7; 54.23	18; 79.33	14; 133.56
September 17–22, 2019	2019 CS U.S. International Figure Skating Classic	6; 49.87	8; 84.08	8; 133.95
Jul. 31 – Aug. 3, 2019	2019 Philadelphia Summer International	11; 38.11	9; 78.40	11; 116.51
