= Sasha Fear =

British ice dancer

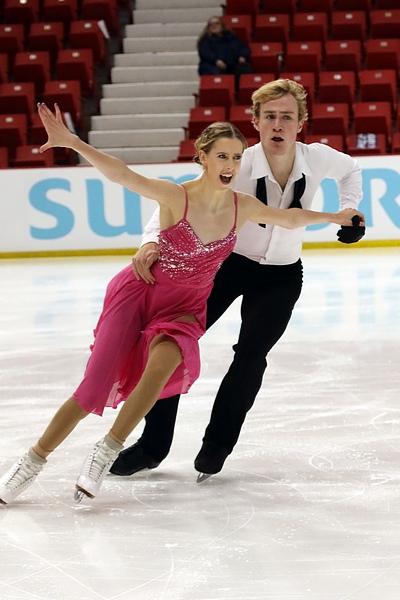
- Fear/Waddell at 2019 JGP United States

Personal information
- Born: 23 May 2002 (age 24) London, England
- Height: 1.73 m (5 ft 8 in)

Figure skating career
- Country: Great Britain
- Coach: Romain Haguenauer; Karen Quinn
- Skating club: Alexandra Palace London
- Began skating: 2004
- Retired: 2026

Sasha Fear (born 23 May 2002) is a retired British ice dancer. With her former skating partner, George Waddell, she is the 2020 CS Nebelhorn Trophy silver medalist and the 2020 CS Budapest Trophy bronze medalist. On the junior level, she is a two-time British junior national champion (2018, 2019) and has competed in the final segment at the 2019 World Junior Championships.

== Personal life ==
Fear was born on 23 May 2002 in London, England to Canadian parents. Her mother Kirsten was a skater and ran at the collegiate level at the University of Western Ontario. Fear's eldest sister, Georgia, was a competitive cross country and track athlete at Dartmouth College and the University of Virginia. Her second oldest sister, Lilah, is also a competitive ice dancer for Great Britain with Lewis Gibson. Fear's uncle, Xavier Majic, competed in the NHL and for the Canadian national hockey team.

Fear studied at South Hampstead High School in London, until beginning online school via the Laurel Springs School in 2019. She ran cross country competitively up through high school. She holds British, Canadian, and American citizenship.

== Career ==
=== Early career ===
Fear began skating in 2004 in London. She competed in ladies' singles and ice dance simultaneously throughout her youth; she also has experience competing in solo dance. Fear trains under Karen Quinn and Alan Abretti at the Alexandria Palace Ice Rink in London during the school year; she splits the remainder of her training time with Romain Haguenauer in Montreal, Canada. She spends summers at the Toronto Cricket, Skating and Curling Club in Toronto, Canada.

Fear competed four seasons with Jack Osman beginning in 2013–14. Fear/Osman split following the 2016–17 ISU Junior Grand Prix, and she teamed up with Elliot Verburg later that season. Fear/Verburg won the 2017 British junior national title three months into their partnership. They finished 15th at the 2017 World Junior Championships. Fear/Verburg split after one season together, after she began outgrowing him.

Fear teamed up with Canadian skater George Waddell in May 2017; their families were already acquainted and the partnership tryout was initiated by coach Romain Haguenauer.

=== 2017–2018 season ===
Fear/Waddell made their international debut at the 2017 Lake Placid Ice Dance International, finishing sixth. They finished seventh and tenth at their Junior Grand Prix assignments in Brisbane, Australia and Minsk, Belarus, respectively. Fear/Waddell won their first international title at the 2017 Leo Scheu Memorial.

Fear/Waddell won the 2018 British junior national title by over 20 points ahead of Emily Rose Brown / James Hernandez and Natalia Paillu Neves / Frank Roselli. At the 2020 World Junior Championships, they finished twenty-first, narrowly missing qualification to the free dance segment.

=== 2018–2019 season ===
Fear/Waddell again opened the season at the 2018 Lake Placid Ice Dance International, finishing eighth. On the 2018–19 ISU Junior Grand Prix, they finished eleventh in Kaunas, Lithuania and ninth in Ostrava, Czech Republic.

Fear/Waddell defended their national title at the 2019 British Championships, winning by over 40 points ahead of Lucy Hancock / Billy Wilson French and Paillu Neves / Roselli. They finished eighteenth at the 2019 World Junior Championships.

=== 2019–2020 season ===
Fear/Waddell opened the season with a pair of eighth-place finishes on the 2019–20 ISU Junior Grand Prix in Lake Placid, New York, United States and Gdańsk, Poland. They won the junior titles at the Mezzaluna Cup and the Pavel Roman Memorial.

Fear/Waddell won silver at the 2020 British Championships, finishing around four points behind Brown / Hernandez. As a result, they missed the World Junior Championships for the first time in their partnership.

=== 2020–2021 season ===
Fear/Waddell made their senior international debut at the 2020 CS Nebelhorn Trophy, which, due to the ongoing COVID-19 pandemic, was attended only by European skaters. They won the silver medal. Attending a second Challenger, the 2020 CS Budapest Trophy, they won the bronze medal. With the British Championships cancelled as a result of the pandemic, Fear/Waddell were named to the British team for the 2021 European Championships. The competition was cancelled on 10 December 2020.

=== 2021–2022 season ===
Fear/Waddell began the season at the Skating Club of Boston-hosted Lake Placid Ice Dance International, where they placed tenth. They next competed at the 2021 CS Nebelhorn Trophy, seeking to qualify a second berth for a British dance team at the 2022 Winter Olympics. They finished eleventh at the event, outside of qualification. They competed at a number of other minor internationals in the fall, finishing fifth at the Budapest Trophy and second at the Viktor Petrenko Cup.

After winning the silver medal at the British championships again, Fear/Waddell were assigned to make their European Championship debut in Tallinn. Qualifying for the free dance, they finished in fifteenth place.

Fear/Waddell concluded the season at the 2022 World Championships, held in Montpellier. Russian dance teams were not allowed to participate as the International Skating Union banned all Russian athletes following their country's invasion of Ukraine. Qualifying to the free dance in their World Championship debut, Fear/Waddell finished seventeenth.

Fear and Waddell ended their partnership on April 25, 2022.

== Programs ==
=== With Waddell ===
Season	Rhythm dance	Free dance
2021–2022	Swing: Another One Bites the Dust; Blues: The Show Must Go On; Swing: Don't Stop Me Now by Queen choreo. by Romain Haguenauer	The Nutcracker by Pyotr Ilyich Tchaikovsky choreo. by Romain Haguenauer
2020–2021	Singin' in the Rain (reprise); Singin' in the Rain (reprise); Overture (from Singin' in the Rain) by Arthur Freed, Nacio Herb Brown, Lennie Hayton choreo. by Romain Haguenauer	An American in Paris; 'S Wonderful; I Got Rhythm by George Gershwin choreo. by Romain Haguenauer
2019–2020	Foxtrot: Singin' in the Rain (reprise); Quickstep: Singin' in the Rain (reprise) (from Singin' in the Rain) by Arthur Freed, Nacio Herb Brown, Lennie Hayton choreo. by Romain Haguenauer	An American in Paris; 'S Wonderful; I Got Rhythm by George Gershwin choreo. by Romain Haguenauer
2018–2019	Tango: Por una cabeza by Carlos Gardel; Tango: Libertango by Astor Piazzolla choreo. by Romain Haguenauer	A Thousand Years by Christina Perri performed by The Piano Guys; Beethoven's Five Secrets by The Piano Guys choreo. by Romain Haguenauer
	Short dance	
2017–2018	Cha Cha: Amor by Ricky Martin; Rhumba: Lo so che finirà by Gigi D'Alessio; Samba: Mujer Latina by Thalía choreo. by Romain Haguenauer	Fix You; Viva la Vida; A Sky Full of Stars by Coldplay choreo. by Romain Haguenauer

=== With Verburg ===
Season	Short dance	Free dance
2016–2017	Blues: That's Life by Dean Kay, Kelly Gordon performed by Westlife; Swing: Jumpin' Jack by Big Bad Voodoo Daddy choreo. by Romain Haguenauer	Peponi (Paradise) by Coldplay performed by The Piano Guys feat. Alex Boyé choreo. by Romain Haguenauer

=== With Osman ===
Season	Short dance	Free dance
2016–2017	Blues: That's Life by Dean Kay, Kelly Gordon performed by Westlife; Swing: Jumpin' Jack by Big Bad Voodoo Daddy choreo. by Romain Haguenauer	Peponi (Paradise) by Coldplay performed by The Piano Guys feat. Alex Boyé choreo. by Romain Haguenauer

== Competitive highlights ==
CS: Challenger Series; JGP: Junior Grand Prix

=== With Waddell ===
International
Event	17–18	18–19	19–20	20–21	21–22
Worlds					17th
Europeans				C	15th
CS Budapest				3rd	
CS Nebelhorn				2nd	11th
Budapest Trophy					5th
Lake Placid IDI					10th
Victor Petrenko Cup					2nd
International: Junior
Junior Worlds	21st	18th			
JGP Australia	7th				
JGP Belarus	10th				
JGP Czech Rep.		9th			
JGP Lithuania		11th			
JGP Poland			8th		
JGP USA			8th		
Egna Trophy	4th	3rd			
Golden Spin			WD		
GP Bratislava		4th			
Ice Star		6th	2nd		
Leo Scheu	1st				
Mezzaluna Cup			1st		
Open d'Andorra	5th				
Pavel Roman		3rd	1st		
National
British Champ.	1st J	1st J	2nd J	C	2nd

=== With Verburg ===
International: Junior
Event	2016–17
Junior Worlds	15th
Bavarian Open	5th
NRW Trophy	8th
Open d'Andorra	4th
Santa Claus Cup	3rd
National
British Champ.	1st J

=== With Osman ===
International: Junior
Event	15–16	16–17
JGP France		12th
NRW Trophy	14th	
Open d'Andorra	3rd	
National
British Champ.	4th J	
