= 2019 CS Nebelhorn Trophy =

- Type: ISU Challenger Series
- Date: September 25 – 28
- Season: 2019–20
- Location: Oberstdorf, Germany
- Host: German Ice Skating Union
- Venue: Eissportzentrum Oberstdorf

Champions
- Men's singles: (Russia) Makar Ignatov
- Ladies' singles: (United States) Mariah Bell
- Pairs: (Canada) Kirsten Moore-Towers / Michael Marinaro
- Ice dance: (Canada) Laurence Fournier Beaudry / Nikolaj Sørensen
- Previous: 2019 CS Nepela Memorial
- Next: 2019 CS Finlandia Trophy

The 2019 CS Nebelhorn Trophy was held in September 2019 in Oberstdorf, Germany. It was part of the 2019–20 ISU Challenger Series. Medals were awarded in the disciplines of men's singles, ladies' singles, pair skating, and ice dance.

== Entries ==
The International Skating Union published the list of entries on August 27, 2019.

Country	Men	Ladies	Pairs	Ice dance
Australia			Ekaterina Alexandrovskaya / Harley Windsor	India Nette / Eron Westwood
Austria	Maurizio Zandron	Stefanie Pesendorfer; Lara Roth	Miriam Ziegler / Severin Kiefer	
Bulgaria		Alexandra Feigin		
Canada	Nam Nguyen		Kirsten Moore-Towers / Michael Marinaro	Laurence Fournier Beaudry / Nikolaj Sørensen; Haley Sales / Nikolas Wamsteeker
China			Tang Feiyao / Yang Yongchao	Wang Shiyue / Liu Xinyu
Chinese Taipei	Meng Ju Lee			
Czech Republic		Klara Stepanova		
Estonia		Eva-Lotta Kiibus		
Germany	Jonathan Hess; Thomas Stoll	Lutricia Bock; Ann-Christin Marold; Nicole Schott	Minerva Fabienne Hase / Nolan Seegert	Shari Koch / Christian Nüchtern; Amanda Peterson / Maximilian Pfisterer; Jennifer Urban / Benjamin Steffan
Hungary		Júlia Láng		Leia Dozzi / Michael Albert Valdez
Ireland	Samuel McAllister; Conor Stakelum			
Israel	Alexei Bychenko; Daniel Samohin	Alina Iushchenkova; Taylor Morris; Alina Soupian	Anna Vernikov / Evgeni Krasnopolski	
Japan	Koshiro Shimada	Marin Honda		
Lithuania				Allison Reed / Saulius Ambrulevičius
Malaysia	Julian Zhi Jie Yee			
Netherlands			Liubov Efimenko / Dmitry Epstein	
North Korea			Ryom Tae-ok / Kim Ju-sik	
Philippines	Christopher Caluza; Yamato Rowe	Alisson Krystle Perticheto		
Russia	Makar Ignatov		Alisa Efimova / Alexander Korovin	
South Africa	Matthew Samuels			
South Korea		Choi Da-bin; Kim Ye-lim		Yura Min / Daniel Eaton
Spain				Olivia Smart / Adrián Díaz
Sweden	Nikolaj Majorov	Matilda Algotsson; Anita Östlund		
Switzerland	Nurullah Sahaka	Tanja Odermatt		
Turkey	Burak Demirboğa	Sinem Kuyucu		
Ukraine		Anastasia Gozhva		Darya Popova / Volodymyr Byelikov
United Kingdom				Lilah Fear / Lewis Gibson
United States		Mariah Bell	Haven Denney / Brandon Frazier; Alexa Scimeca Knierim / Chris Knierim	Christina Carreira / Anthony Ponomarenko; Kaitlin Hawayek / Jean-Luc Baker

=== Changes to preliminary assignments ===
Date	Discipline	Withdrew	Added	Reason/Other notes	Refs
August 28	Ladies	(Thailand) Thita Lamsam	(Czech Republic) Klara Stepanova		
August 28	Ladies	N/A	(Germany) Nicole Schott		
August 28	Pairs	(United States) Sarah Feng / TJ Nyman	(United States) Nica Digerness / Danny Neudecker	Split	
August 28	Pairs	(Italy) Rebecca Ghilardi / Filippo Ambrosini			
August 28	Ice dance	N/A	(United Kingdom) Robynne Tweedale / Joseph Buckland		
September 3	Ladies	(Estonia) Gerli Liinamäe			
September 10	Men	(Netherlands) Thomas Kennes			
September 10	Men	(Switzerland) Lukas Britschgi			
September 10	Ladies	(Netherlands) Lenne Van Gorp			
September 10	Pairs	(United States) Nica Digerness / Danny Neudecker			
September 10	Ice dance	(Belarus) Emiliya Kalehanova / Uladzislau Palkhouski			
September 10	Ice dance	(United Kingdom) Robynne Tweedale / Joseph Buckland			
September 18	Men	(United States) Jason Brown			
September 18	Ladies	(Canada) Aurora Cotop			
September 23	Men	(China) Yan Han			
September 23	Men	(Germany) Paul Fentz			
September 24	Men	(Germany) Catalin Dimitrescu			

== Results ==
=== Men ===
Rank	Name	Nation	Total points	SP		FS	
1	Makar Ignatov	Russia	220.51	7	65.28	1	155.23
2	Koshiro Shimada	Japan	214.98	1	74.32	4	140.66
3	Alexei Bychenko	Israel	214.70	2	70.46	3	144.24
4	Nam Nguyen	Canada	209.84	9	60.52	2	149.32
5	Daniel Samohin	Israel	205.11	3	69.52	5	135.59
6	Julian Zhi Jie Yee	Malaysia	193.55	4	68.87	8	124.68
7	Christopher Caluza	Philippines	191.89	6	65.97	7	125.92
8	Nikolaj Majorov	Sweden	186.36	12	55.92	6	130.44
9	Burak Demirboğa	Turkey	185.52	5	66.07	9	119.45
10	Maurizio Zandron	Austria	180.63	8	63.89	10	116.74
11	Thomas Stoll	Germany	172.64	11	59.67	11	112.97
12	Nurullah Sahaka	Switzerland	170.99	10	59.87	12	111.12
13	Jonathan Hess	Germany	156.59	15	51.15	13	105.44
14	Samuel McAllister	Ireland	152.72	14	51.98	14	100.74
15	Conor Stakelum	Ireland	146.78	13	52.75	15	94.03
16	Yamato Rowe	Philippines	134.72	16	47.74	17	86.98
17	Meng Ju Lee	Chinese Taipei	122.44	17	41.63	18	80.81
18	Matthew Samuels	South Africa	120.04	18	32.45	16	87.59

=== Ladies ===
Rank	Name	Nation	Total points	SP		FS	
1	Mariah Bell	United States	205.13	1	68.45	1	136.68
2	Kim Ye-lim	South Korea	186.27	2	67.06	2	119.21
3	Nicole Schott	Germany	177.76	3	64.09	6	113.67
4	Alexandra Feigin	Bulgaria	177.37	4	60.75	3	116.62
5	Marin Honda	Japan	174.01	6	58.08	5	115.93
6	Eva-Lotta Kiibus	Estonia	166.10	10	50.14	4	115.96
7	Choi Da-bin	South Korea	157.18	8	53.91	7	103.27
8	Anita Östlund	Sweden	150.81	5	58.63	10	92.18
9	Stefanie Pesendorfer	Austria	146.66	12	47.75	8	98.91
10	Ann-Christin Marold	Germany	140.79	9	51.02	13	89.77
11	Tanja Odermatt	Switzerland	139.87	13	46.10	9	93.77
12	Alisson Krystle Perticheto	Philippines	135.93	11	48.56	14	87.37
13	Matilda Algotsson	Sweden	134.02	17	42.15	11	91.87
14	Taylor Morris	Israel	133.56	7	54.23	18	79.33
15	Júlia Láng	Hungary	132.57	18	41.95	12	90.62
16	Anastasia Gozhva	Ukraine	127.80	16	44.21	15	83.59
17	Klara Stepanova	Czech Republic	126.68	14	45.76	17	80.92
18	Sinem Kuyucu	Turkey	122.64	20	41.34	16	81.30
19	Lutricia Bock	Germany	120.01	15	44.99	22	75.02
20	Alina Iushchenkova	Israel	120.00	19	41.94	19	78.06
21	Lara Roth	Austria	113.45	21	36.78	20	76.67
22	Alina Soupian	Israel	112.36	22	36.46	21	75.90

=== Pairs ===
Rank	Name	Nation	Total points	SP		FS	
1	Kirsten Moore-Towers / Michael Marinaro	Canada	210.35	1	71.76	1	138.59
2	Alexa Scimeca Knierim / Chris Knierim	United States	202.41	2	70.83	2	131.58
3	Ryom Tae-ok / Kim Ju-sik	North Korea	183.02	4	66.91	5	116.11
4	Tang Feiyao / Yang Yongchao	China	182.76	5	66.29	4	116.47
5	Minerva Fabienne Hase / Nolan Seegert	Germany	182.30	3	67.99	6	114.31
6	Haven Denney / Brandon Frazier	United States	181.70	6	61.23	3	120.47
7	Alisa Efimova / Alexander Korovin	Russia	171.46	8	59.94	7	111.52
8	Miriam Ziegler / Severin Kiefer	Austria	163.45	9	59.45	8	104.00
9	Ekaterina Alexandrovskaya / Harley Windsor	Australia	157.91	7	60.26	9	97.65
10	Anna Vernikov / Evgeni Krasnopolski	Israel	139.90	10	48.74	10	91.16
11	Liubov Efimenko / Dmitry Epstein	Netherlands	111.29	11	46.77	11	64.52

=== Ice dance ===
Rank	Name	Nation	Total points	RD		FD	
1	Laurence Fournier Beaudry / Nikolaj Sørensen	Canada	201.00	1	81.16	1	119.84
2	Kaitlin Hawayek / Jean-Luc Baker	United States	192.47	4	75.77	2	116.70
3	Christina Carreira / Anthony Ponomarenko	United States	190.35	2	76.99	4	113.36
4	Lilah Fear / Lewis Gibson	United Kingdom	188.25	6	74.82	3	113.43
5	Olivia Smart / Adrián Díaz	Spain	187.55	3	75.80	5	111.75
6	Wang Shiyue / Liu Xinyu	China	184.72	5	75.36	6	109.36
7	Allison Reed / Saulius Ambrulevičius	Lithuania	180.13	7	73.41	7	106.72
8	Jennifer Urban / Benjamin Steffan	Germany	165.61	9	63.54	8	102.07
9	Yura Min / Daniel Eaton	South Korea	163.42	10	63.23	9	100.19
10	Shari Koch / Christian Nüchtern	Germany	162.31	8	65.30	10	97.01
11	Haley Sales / Nikolas Wamsteeker	Canada	157.59	11	61.36	11	96.23
12	Darya Popova / Volodymyr Byelikov	Ukraine	134.72	12	51.57	12	83.15
13	Leia Dozzi / Michael Albert Valdez	Hungary	124.99	14	48.23	13	76.76
14	Amanda Peterson / Maximilian Pfisterer	Germany	122.45	13	48.64	14	73.81
15	India Nette / Eron Westwood	Australia	95.41	15	33.29	15	62.12
