= Darya Popova =

Ukrainian ice dancer

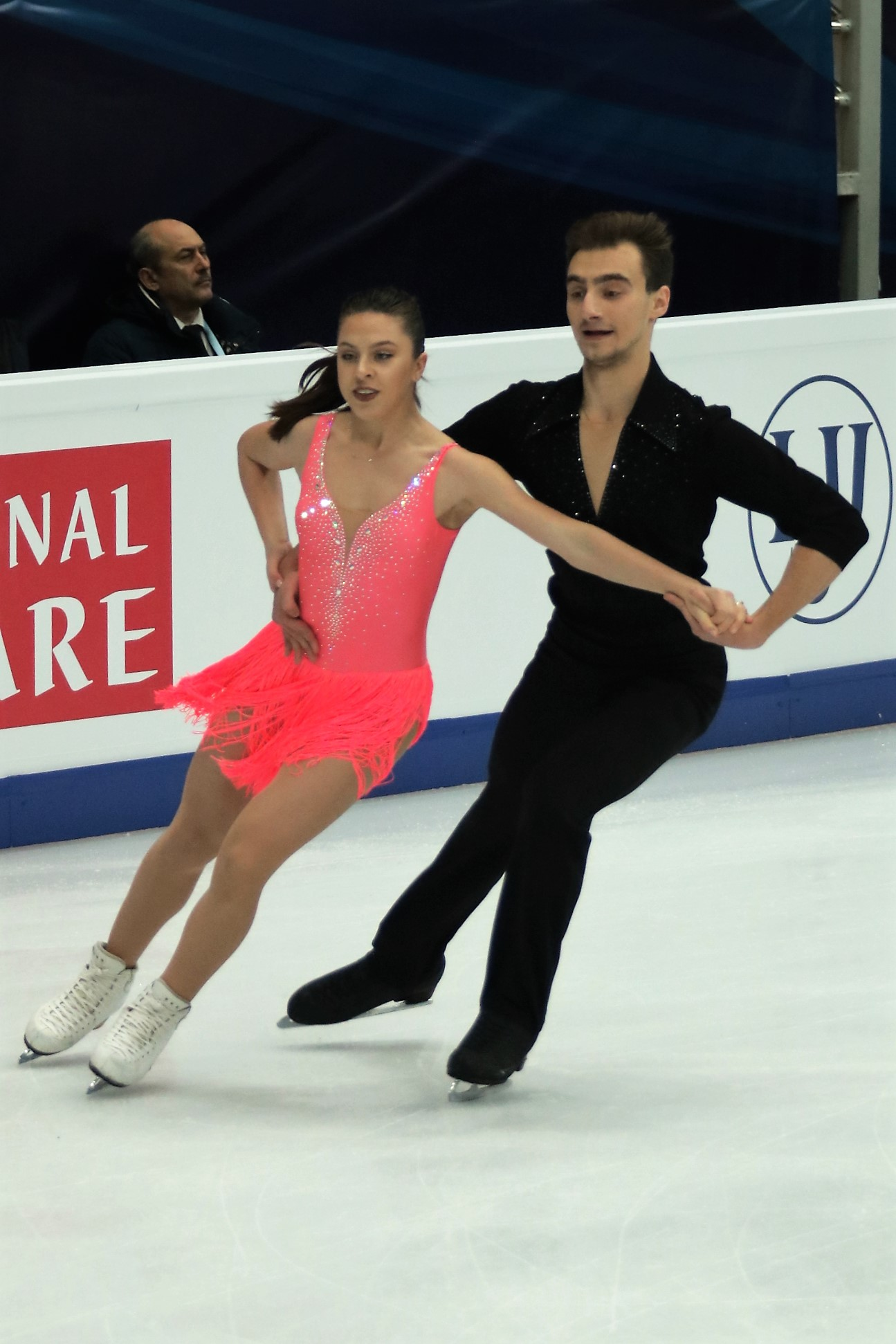
- Popova/Byelikov at the 2018 European Championships

Personal information
- Native name: Дар'я Попова
- Born: 29 September 2001 (age 25) Kharkiv, Ukraine
- Height: 1.65 m (5 ft 5 in)

Figure skating career
- Country: Ukraine
- Coach: Halyna Churylova, Mariana Kozlova
- Skating club: Kolos Kharkiv
- Began skating: 2005

Darya Popova (Ukrainian: Дар'я Сергіївна Попова; born 29 September 2001) is a Ukrainian ice dancer. With her former skating partner, Volodymyr Byelikov, she is the 2017 Volvo Open Cup silver medalist and 2019 Ukrainian national champion on the senior level. The team has finished within the top twelve at two World Junior Championships (2017, 2018).

== Career ==
=== Early years ===
Popova began learning to skate in 2005. Early in her career, she skated with Vadym Kravtsov and Volodymyr Nakisko. During the 2015–2016 season, Popova/Nakisko competed at two ISU Junior Grand Prix (JGP) events and won the bronze medal at the Ukrainian Junior Championships. They were coached by Halyna Churylova and Mariana Kozlova in Kharkiv.

=== 2016–2017 season ===
Popova and Volodymyr Byelikov teamed up in 2016, coached by Halyna Churylova and Mariana Kozlova in Kharkiv. They made their international debut at the ISU Junior Grand Prix in the Czech Republic in early September 2016. They placed 8th in Ostrava and 7th at their next JGP assignment, in Tallinn, Estonia. The duo took silver at the senior-level Ukrainian Championship before winning gold at the junior event.

Popova/Byelikov were selected to represent Ukraine at the 2017 World Junior Championships in Taipei, Taiwan; they placed 11th in the short dance, 12th in the free dance, and 12th overall.

=== 2017–2018 season ===
During the 2017 JGP series, Popova/Byelikov placed 6th competing in September in Minsk, Belarus, and 5th in early October in Gdańsk, Poland. Their senior international debut came in November at the Volvo Open Cup in Riga, Latvia. They won silver at the event, finishing second to Germany's Katharina Müller / Tim Dieck and ahead of Hungary's Anna Yanovskaya / Ádám Lukács.

Continuing on the senior level, Popova/Byelikov placed 9th at the 2017 CS Tallinn Trophy, 8th at the Santa Claus Cup, and second at the Ukrainian Championships. They were included in Ukraine's team to the 2018 European Championships, held in January in Moscow, but did not reach the free dance, placing 22nd in the short. In March, they competed at the 2018 World Junior Championships in Sofia (Bulgaria), ranking 9th in the short, 11th in the free, and 11th overall.

=== 2018–2019 season ===
Popova/Byelikov won bronze at their first 2018 Junior Grand Prix event in Lithuania, and then placed fourth in Slovenia. Following that, they competed at the 2018 CS Tallinn Trophy, placing fifth, and won their first Ukrainian national title. After a sixteenth-place finish at the 2019 European Championships, they competed at the 2019 World Junior Championships, placing eleventh.

=== 2019–2020 season ===
Competing in two Challenger events, Popova/Byelikov placed twelfth at the 2019 CS Nebelhorn Trophy and tenth at the 2019 CS Golden Spin of Zagreb. They won the silver medal at the Ukrainian championships, and competed at a number of minor internationals.

=== 2020–2021 season ===
Beginning the season at the 2020 CS Nebelhorn Trophy, which due to the COVID-19 pandemic was attended only by European skaters. They won the bronze medal.

== Programs ==
=== With Byelikov ===
Season	Rhythm dance	Free dance
2019–2021	Blues: Hopelessly Devoted to You; Quickstep: You're the One That I Want (from Grease) by John Farrar	Believer performed by Simply Three; I Can't Go On Without You by Kaleo
2018–2019	Waltz: Larrons en foire (from Micmacs) by Raphaël Beau; Tango	Chopin Nocturne performed by David Garrett; Run by Ludovico Einaudi
	Short dance	
2017–2018	Junior level: Salsa: Salsa en la Calle; Rhumba: Casi un Bolero by Ricky Martin; Merengue: Can, Can, Can by Los Reyes del Ritmo; Senior level: Cha Cha: Bla Bla Bla Cha Cha Cha by Petty Booka; Merengue: Can Can Can by Los Reyes del Ritmo	Once Upon a Time in Mexico by Robert Rodriguez
2016–2017	Blues: Save My Soul; Swing: Cinnamon Girls by Big Bad Voodoo Daddy	Code Name Vivaldi; Adagio by Tomaso Albinoni; Storm by Antonio Vivaldi performed by Vanessa-Mae

=== With Nakisko ===
Season	Short dance	Free dance
2015–2016	March: Radetzky March by Johann Strauss I; Waltz: Masquerade Waltz by Aram Khachaturian	Song of Spirits by Karl Jenkins

== Competitive highlights ==
CS: Challenger Series; JGP: Junior Grand Prix

=== With Byelikov ===
International
Event	16–17	17–18	18–19	19–20	20–21
European Champ.		22nd	16th		
CS Golden Spin				10th	
CS Nebelhorn Trophy				12th	3rd
CS Tallinn Trophy		9th	5th		
CS Warsaw Cup				7th	
Mentor Toruń Cup				5th	
NRW Trophy				2nd	
Santa Claus Cup		8th			
Volvo Open Cup		2nd		4th	
Winter Star					1st
International: Junior
World Junior Champ.	12th	11th	11th		
JGP Belarus		6th			
JGP Czech Republic	8th				
JGP Estonia	7th				
JGP Lithuania			3rd		
JGP Poland		5th			
JGP Slovenia			4th		
Jégvirág Cup	1st				
NRW Trophy	4th				
National
Ukrainian Champ.	2nd	2nd	1st	2nd	
Ukrainian Junior Champ.	1st	1st			
J = Junior level

=== With Nakisko ===
International: Junior
Event	12–13	13–14	14–15	15–16
JGP Austria				13th
JGP Croatia				10th
NRW Trophy				8th
Santa Claus Cup				6th
International: Advanced novice
NRW Trophy	9th	2nd	4th	
National
Ukrainian Jr. Champ.				3rd
J = Junior level
