= Eva-Lotta Kiibus =

Estonian figure skater (born 2003)

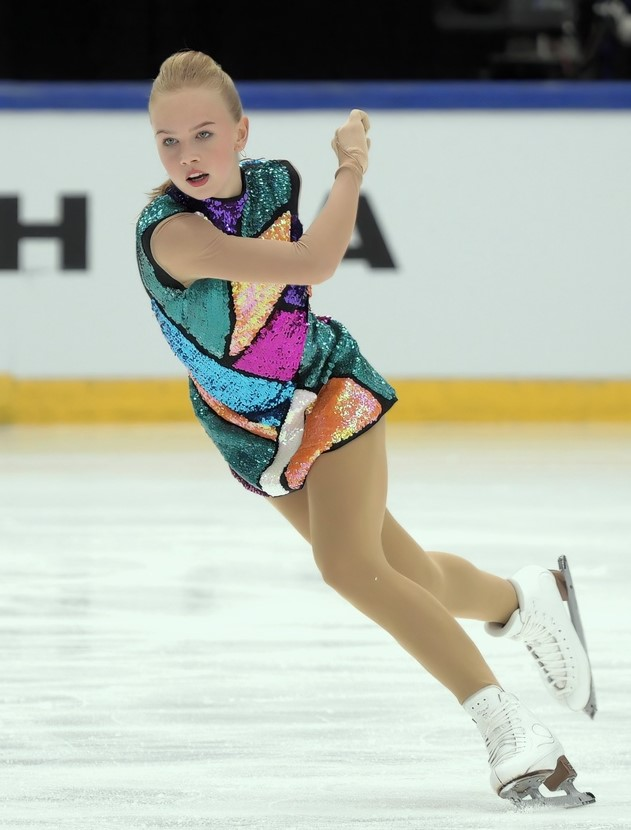
- Eva-Lotta Kiibus at the 2021 Finlandia Trophy

Personal information
- Born: 17 January 2003 (age 23) Tallinn, Estonia
- Home town: Keila, Estonia
- Height: 1.65 m (5 ft 5 in)

Figure skating career
- Country: Estonia
- Discipline: Women's singles
- Coach: Thomas Kennes
- Skating club: Figure Skating Club Kristalluisk
- Began skating: 2007
- Retired: November 18, 2025
- Highest WS: 20th (2020–21)

Medal record
Estonian Championships
Gold medal – first place	2020 Tallinn	Singles
Gold medal – first place	2021 Tallinn	Singles
Silver medal – second place	2019 Tallinn	Singles
Silver medal – second place	2022 Tallinn	Singles
Bronze medal – third place	2018 Tallinn	Singles

Eva-Lotta Kiibus (born 17 January 2003) is a retired Estonian figure skater. She is the 2020 Nebelhorn Trophy champion, a two-time Estonian national champion (2020–21), and a three-time Tallink Hotels Cup champion (2018–2019, 2021). Kiibus has represented Estonia at the European and World championships and finished twenty-first at the 2022 Winter Olympics.

== Personal life ==
Kiibus was born on 17 January 2003 in Tallinn. Her older brother is Estonian rapper Nublu. As of 2023, she is a student at the University of Tartu.

== Career ==
=== Early years ===
Kiibus began learning to skate in 2007. She competed in the advanced novice ranks in the 2015–2016 season and made her junior international debut the following season.

=== 2018–2019 season: Senior international debut ===
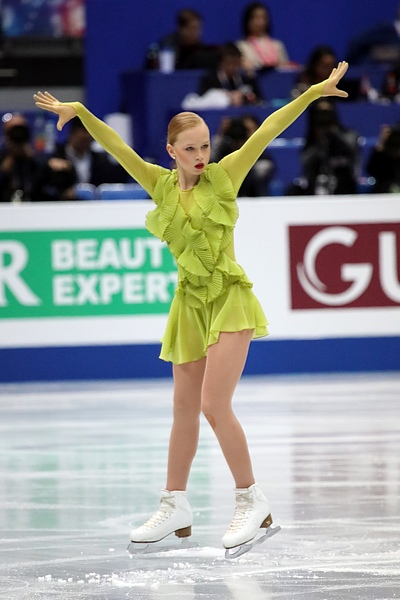
Kiibus at the 2019 World Championships

In September 2018, Kiibus debuted on both the ISU Junior Grand Prix series and the senior-level ISU Challenger Series. In December, she won silver at Estonia's senior championships, finishing second to Gerli Liinamäe. She became the national junior champion the following month. In February 2019, she won gold in the senior ladies' category at the Tallink Hotels Cup.

In March, Kiibus appeared at her first ISU Championship – the 2019 World Junior Championships in Zagreb, Croatia. She was ranked 26th in the short program but did not advance to the final segment. Later that month, she competed at the 2019 World Championships in Saitama, Japan. She qualified for the final segment by placing 23rd in the short program.

=== 2019–2020 season: First Estonian national title ===
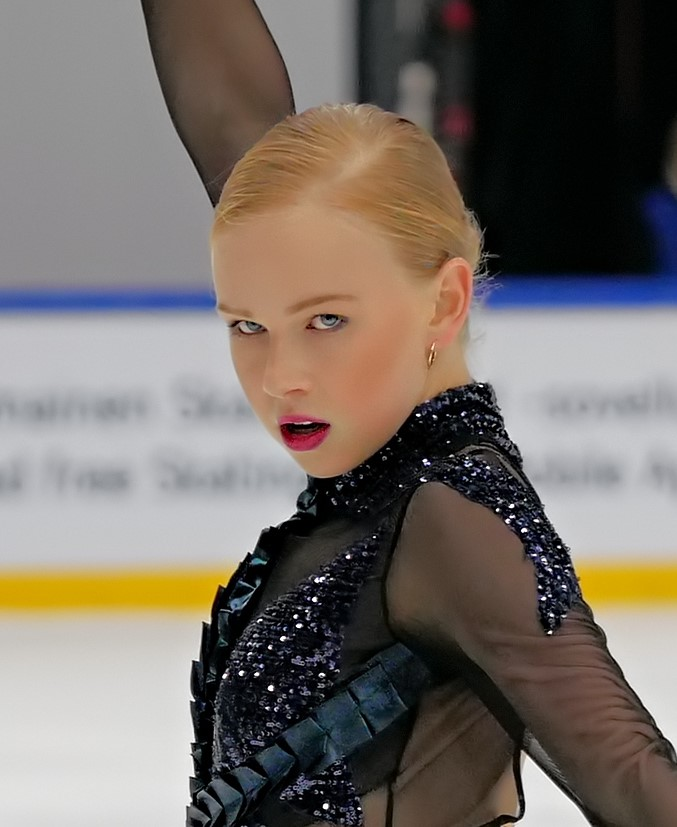
Kiibus during the short program at the 2019 CS Finlandia Trophy

Kiibus continued competing on senior and junior levels for the new season. On the Junior Grand Prix circuit, she placed seventh at the 2019 JGP Chelyabinsk in Russia and eighth at 2019 JGP Egna in Italy. On the senior level, in the first half of the season, she took part in three Challenger events, initially placing sixth at both the 2019 CS Nebelhorn Trophy and 2019 CS Finlandia Trophy. She was eleventh at the 2019 CS Golden Spin of Zagreb. In December, Kiibus became the Estonian senior national champion.

In January 2020, Kiibus first competed at the 2020 Winter Youth Olympics, placing fourteenth. She then made her debut at the European Championships, placing eleventh in the short program. Fifth in the free skate with a new personal best, she rose to seventh place overall. Kiibus said afterward that it was "such an experience. I felt so good, and I skated with my heart." She was assigned to compete at the World Championships in Montreal, but those were cancelled as a result of the coronavirus pandemic.

=== 2020–2021 season: Grand Prix debut ===
With pandemic-related travel restrictions in place, Kiibus started off her season at a 2020 CS Nebelhorn Trophy attended only by skaters training in Europe. Third after the short program, she won the free skate and took the gold medal, her first Challenger title. Shortly afterward, she won the silver medal at the 2020 CS Budapest Trophy, regarding her performance there as an improvement over Nebelhorn despite the lower ordinal.

Kiibus was assigned to make her Grand Prix debut at the 2020 Internationaux de France, the ISU having opted to allot the Grand Prix for that season based primarily on geographic location. The event was later cancelled due to the pandemic, but Kiibus was subsequently reassigned to the 2020 Rostelecom Cup. She placed sixth at the Moscow event. Kiibus was one of several skaters to contract COVID-19 at the Rostelecom Cup, as a result of which she took weeks to recover, and indicated at the Estonian Championships that mental recovery would take longer. She placed third in the short program at the national championships. She rallied in the free skate to edge out Gerli Liinamäe for the gold medal by 0.31 points. Following her victory at the national championships, Kiibus competed internationally again at the Tallink Hotels Cup, winning her third gold medal.

Competing at the 2021 World Championships in Stockholm, Kiibus placed nineteenth in the short program but moved up to fourteenth place after the free skate. Kiibus qualified for a place for Estonia at the 2022 Winter Olympics. She said she was "happy and proud that I was able to control my nerves."

=== 2021–2022 season: Beijing Olympics ===
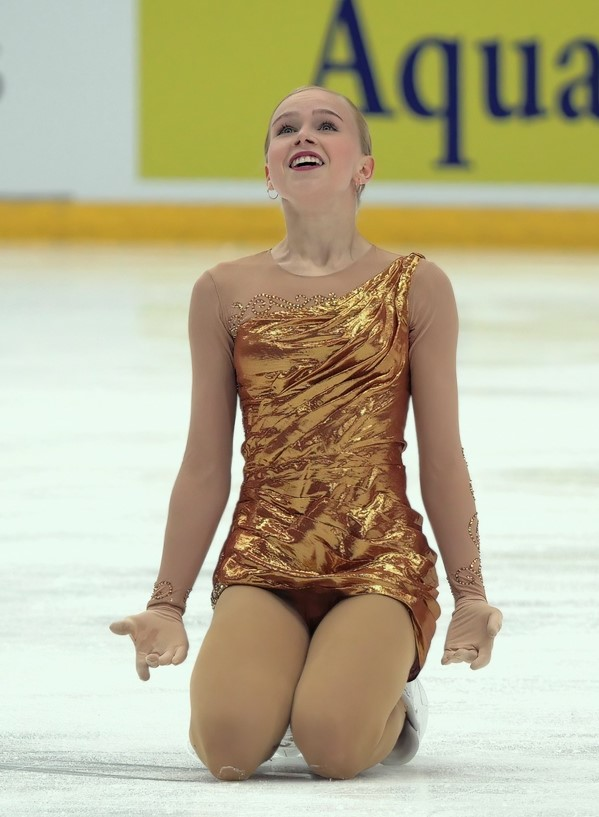
Kiibus finishing her free skate at the 2021 CS Finlandia Trophy

Kiibus began the Olympic season at the 2021 CS Lombardia Trophy, where she placed eleventh. She next competed at the 2021 CS Finlandia Trophy, skating two clean programs to place seventh overall. She earned new personal bests in the free program and overall score, breaking 200 points for the first time in her career. She enjoyed less success at her two subsequent events, first finishing seventeenth at the 2021 CS Cup of Austria, notably with a score nearly forty points behind domestic rival Niina Petrõkina, who won the bronze medal. She then finished in eleventh place at the 2021 Rostelecom Cup.

Petrõkina again bested Kiibus at the 2021 Estonian Championships, where she finished second overall with a score of 183.77, almost 29 points out of the gold medal position. She finished behind Petrõkina again at the 2022 European Championships, but despite this, due to the Estonian federation's criteria, she was still named to the Estonian Olympic team. Kiibus' coach Anna Levandi said that while the season had been difficult for her, she was preparing to show her best in Beijing.

Competing at the 2022 Winter Olympics in the women's event, Kiibus placed twenty-first in the short program after falling on her solo jump attempt. She was twentieth in the free skate but remained twenty-first overall. Kiibus had surgery on one of her legs following the Olympics and was off the ice for three months recovering.

=== 2022–2023 season ===
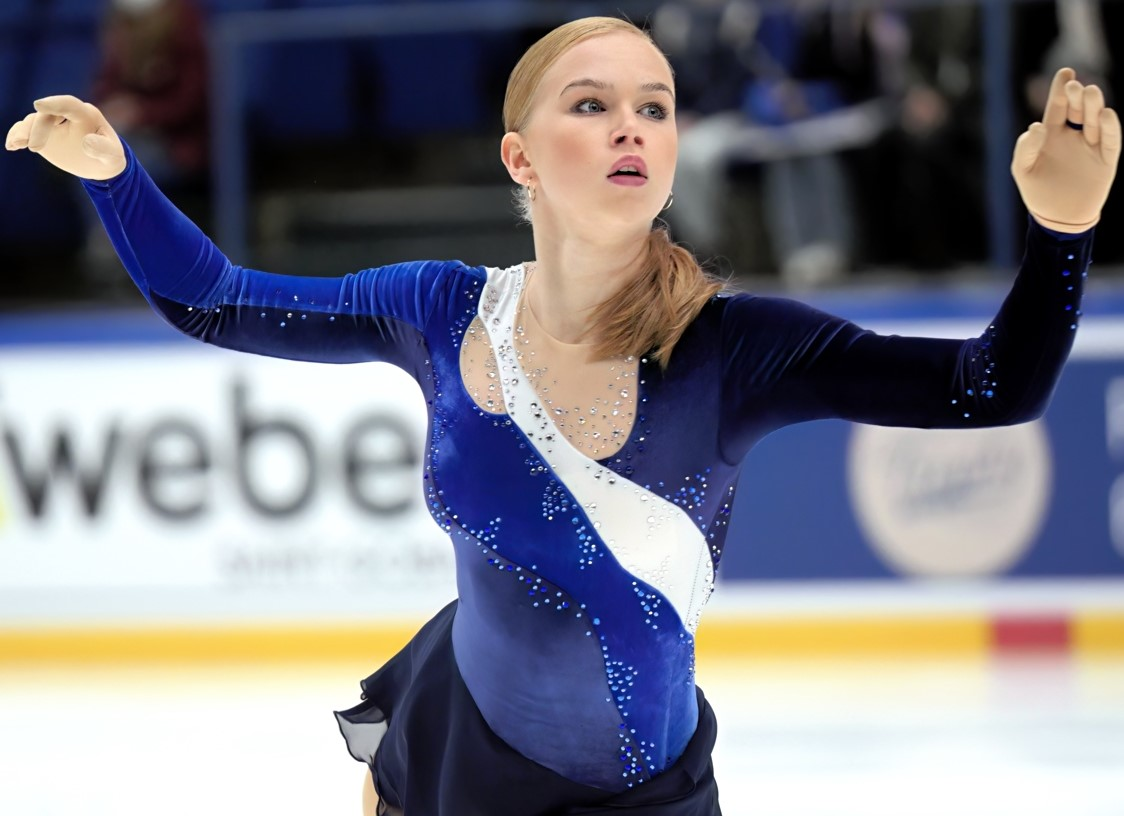
Kiibus performing her free skate at the 2022 CS Finlandia Trophy

On 31 August 2022, Kiibus announced that she had decided to change coaches, parting ways with longtime coach Anna Levandi to train in the Netherlands under Thomas Kennes. In her season debut at the 2022 CS Nebelhorn Trophy, she won the bronze medal. On the Grand Prix, she was twelfth of twelve skaters at both the 2022 NHK Trophy and 2022 Grand Prix of Espoo.

Kiibus was part of the Estonian delegation to the 2023 Winter World University Games, where she came sixteenth. She then finished in fifteenth place at the 2023 European Championships.

In February 2023, Kiibus was diagnosed with stress fractures in the tibias of both her legs, as a result of which she stopped training for two months and began gradually working her way back into athletic form.

=== 2023–24 season: Injury struggles ===
Kiibus injured herself again in August and as a result missed much of the 2023–24 season. She returned to competition in late January when she competed at the 2024 Bavarian Open, finishing fourth. Kiibus subsequently went on to compete at the 2024 Challenge Cup, where she placed fifth.

She ended the season by winning silver and gold at the 2024 Maria Olszewska Memorial and 2024 Coupe du Printemps, respectively.

=== 2024–25 season: Final competitive season ===
Kiibus began the season by competing on the 2024–25 ISU Challenger Series, finishing nineteenth at the 2024 Budapest Trophy. She went on to finish fifth at the 2024 Tirnavia Ice Cup, fourth at the 2024 NRW Trophy, ninth at the 2024 Warsaw Cup, and tenth at the 2024 Golden Spin of Zagreb.

At 2025 Estonian Championships, Kiibus finished in fifth place. She subsequently ended the season by finishing seventh at the 2025 International Challenge Cup and winning gold at the 2025 Coupe du Printemps.

In November 2025, Kiibus announced her retirement from competitive figure skating citing burnout as a major reason for her decision.

== Programs ==
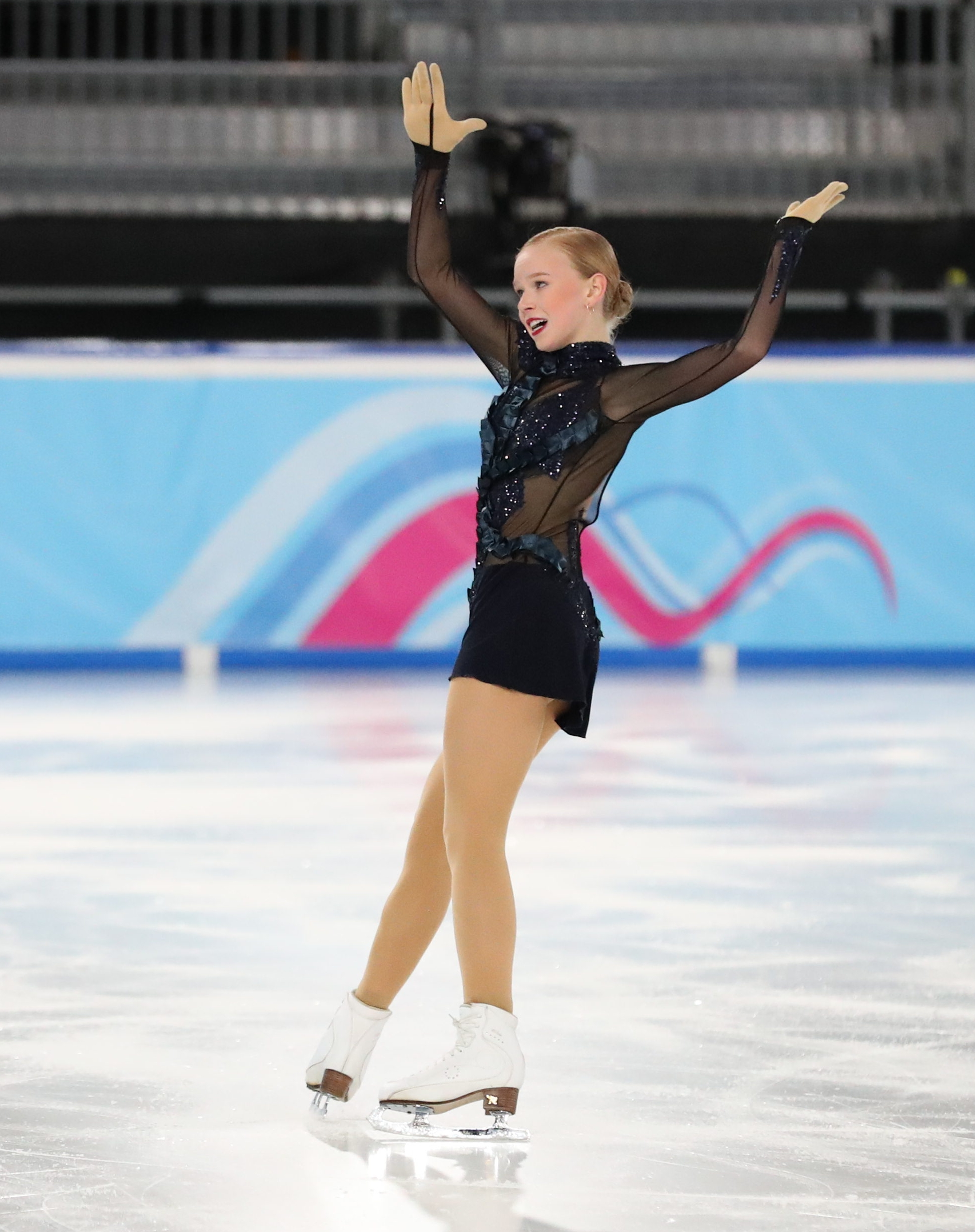
Kiibus at the 2020 Winter Youth Olympics

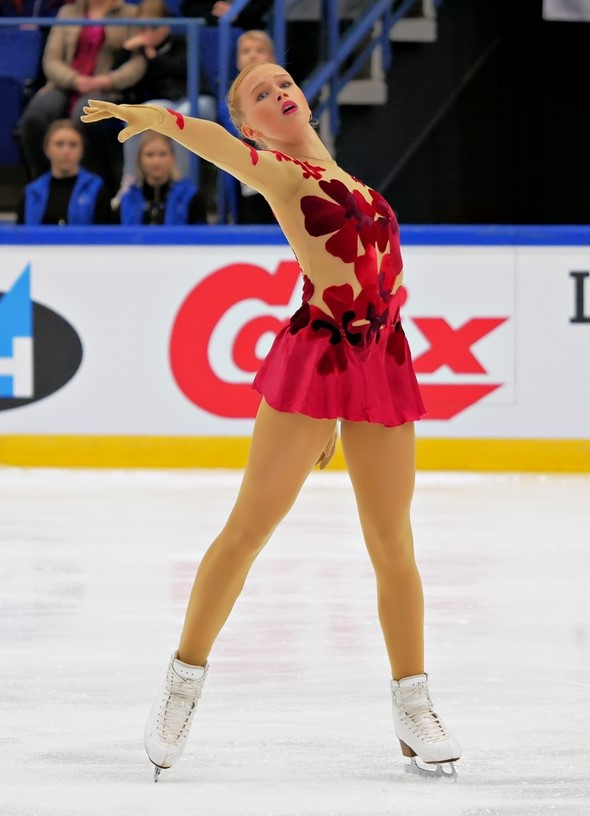
Kiibus performing her free skate at the 2019 CS Finlandia Trophy

Season	Short program	Free skating	Exhibition
2024–2025	All by Myself by Eric Carmen performed by Celine Dion arranged by Maxime Rodriguez choreo. by Benoît Richaud	Carmen by Georges Bizet performed by Los Angeles Chamber Orchestra, State Chamber Ensemble of Armenia, Vladimir Spivakov, & Carmen Suite by Rodion Shchedrin arranged by Cédric Tour choreo. Benoît Richaud	
2023–2024	All by Myself by Eric Carmen performed by Celine Dion arranged by Maxime Rodriguez choreo. by Benoît Richaud	Carmen by Georges Bizet performed by Los Angeles Chamber Orchestra, State Chamber Ensemble of Armenia, Vladimir Spivakov, & Carmen Suite by Rodion Shchedrin arranged by Cédric Tour choreo. Benoît Richaud	
2022–2023	Baianá by Barbatuques choreo. by Benoît Richaud	A Star Is Born; Shallow by Lady Gaga & Bradley Cooper; I'll Never Love Again by Lady Gaga choreo. by Benoît Richaud	Sign of the Times by Harry Styles choreo. by Benoît Richaud
2021–2022	Baianá by Barbatuques choreo. by Benoît Richaud	A Star Is Born; Shallow by Lady Gaga & Bradley Cooper; I'll Never Love Again by Lady Gaga choreo. by Benoît Richaud	Hold Back the River by James Bay
2020–2021	Sign of the Times by Harry Styles choreo. by Benoît Richaud	Piano Concerto No. 2 by Sergei Rachmaninoff choreo. by Benoît Richaud	Without Weapon by Polina Gagarina
2019–2020	The House of the Rising Sun (from The Magnificent Seven) performed by Heavy Young Heathens	Histoire d'un amour by Carlos Eleta Almarán performed by Hélène Ségara	
2018–2019	Tango by Rein Rannap choreo. by Vakhtang Murvanidze, Anna Levandi	Michael Meets Mozart by The Piano Guys choreo. by Vakhtang Murvanidze, Anna Levandi	
2017–2018	Dernière danse by Indila	Michael Meets Mozart by The Piano Guys choreo. by Vakhtang Murvanidze, Anna Levandi	
2016–2017	Dernière danse by Indila	Satellite by Lena Meyer-Landrut	

== Competitive highlights ==
- GP – Event of the ISU Grand Prix Series
- JGP – Event of the ISU Junior Grand Prix Series
- CS – Event of the ISU Challenger Series
- TBD – Assigned
- C – Cancelled

Competition placements at senior level
Season	2016–17	2017–18	2018–19	2019–20	2020–21	2021–22	2022–23	2023–24	2024–25
Winter Olympics						20th			
World Championships			22nd	C	14th				
European Championships				7th		10th	15th		
Estonian Championships	8th	3rd	2nd	1st	1st	2nd			5th
GP Finland							12th		
GP NHK Trophy							12th		
GP Rostelecom Cup					6th	11th			
CS Budapest Trophy					2nd				19th
CS Cup of Austria						17th			
CS Finlandia Trophy			14th	6th		7th	12th		
CS Golden Spin of Zagreb				11th					10th
CS Lombardia Trophy			14th			11th			
CS Nebelhorn Trophy				6th	1st		3rd		
CS Tallinn Trophy			14th						
CS Warsaw Cup									9th
Bavarian Open								4th	
Challenge Cup								6th	7th
Coupe du Printemps								1st	1st
Maria Olszewska Memorial								2nd	
NRW Trophy									4th
Tallink Hotels Cup			1st	2nd	1st				
Tirnavia Ice Cup									5th
Volvo Open Cup			7th						
Winter University Games							16th		

Competition placements at junior level
Season	2016–17	2017–18	2018–19	2019–20
Winter Youth Olympics				14th
World Junior Championships			26th	
Estonian Championships	6th	2nd	1st	
JGP Italy				8th
JGP Lithuania			13th	
JGP Russia				7th
Challenge Cup	5th	11th		
EYOF			4th	
Kaunas Ice Cup		3rd		
Prague Ice Cup		6th		
Tallinn Trophy	21st	5th		
Volvo Open Cup	21st			

== Detailed results ==
ISU personal best scores in the +5/-5 GOE System
Segment	Type	Score	Event
Total	TSS	202.04	2021 CS Finlandia Trophy
Short program	TSS	65.37	2020 CS Budapest Trophy
Short program	TES	36.10	2021 CS Finlandia Trophy
Short program	PCS	30.29	2022 European Championships
Free skating	TSS	137.51	2021 CS Finlandia Trophy
Free skating	TES	73.17	2021 CS Finlandia Trophy
Free skating	PCS	64.34	2021 CS Finlandia Trophy

=== Senior level ===
2024–25 season
Date	Event	SP	FS	Total
March 14–16, 2025	2025 Coupe du Printemps	4; 49.08	1; 108.45	1; 157.53
February 13–16, 2025	2025 International Challenge Cup	9; 47.98	7; 100.27	7; 148.25
December 14–15, 2024	2025 Estonian Championships	4; 55.08	5; 98.95	5; 154.03
December 4–7, 2024	2024 CS Golden Spin of Zagreb	11; 49.50	10; 100.52	10; 150.02
November 20–24, 2024	2024 CS Warsaw Cup	8; 55.90	9; 98.73	9; 154.63
November 12–17, 2024	2024 NRW Trophy	2; 53.96	5; 91.57	4; 145.53
November 1–3, 2024	2024 Tirnavia Ice Cup	6; 46.43	5; 91.27	5; 137.70
October 11–13, 2024	2024 CS Budapest Trophy	18; 37.16	19; 62.09	19; 99.25
2023–2024 season
Date	Event	SP	FS	Total
March 15–17, 2024	2024 Coupe du Printemps	1; 62.61	1; 109.85	1; 172.46
March 6–10, 2024	2024 Maria Olszewska Memorial	1; 53.98	2; 95.21	2; 149.19
February 22–25, 2024	2024 Challenge Cup	8; 46.74	6; 108.33	6; 155.07
January 30–February 4, 2024	2024 Bavarian Open	4; 53.98	4; 100.86	4; 154.84
2022–2023 season
Date	Event	SP	FS	Total
January 25–29, 2023	2023 European Championships	15; 55.26	13; 101.69	15; 156.95
January 13–15, 2023	2023 Winter World University Games	11; 55.12	16; 84.54	16; 139.66
November 25–27, 2022	2022 Grand Prix of Espoo	11; 49.27	12; 89.62	12; 138.89
November 18–20, 2022	2022 NHK Trophy	12; 48.56	11; 113.81	12; 162.37
October 4–9, 2022	2022 CS Finlandia Trophy	13; 53.17	11; 100.18	12; 153.35
September 21–24, 2022	2022 CS Nebelhorn Trophy	10; 50.94	3; 114.27	3; 165.21
2021–2022 season
Date	Event	SP	FS	Total
February 15–17, 2022	2022 Winter Olympics	20; 59.55	19; 112.20	20; 171.75
January 10–16, 2022	2022 European Championships	15; 59.16	11; 112.48	11; 171.64
December 4–5, 2021	2022 Estonian Championships	7; 52.46	2; 130.61	2; 183.07
November 26–28, 2021	2021 Rostelecom Cup	12; 49.26	11; 113.85	11; 163.11
November 11–14, 2021	2021 CS Cup of Austria	9; 52.24	17; 91.16	17; 143.40
October 7–10, 2021	2021 CS Finlandia Trophy	8; 64.53	5; 137.51	7; 202.04
September 10–12, 2021	2021 CS Lombardia Trophy	16; 50.78	10; 104.74	11; 155.52
2020–2021 season
Date	Event	SP	FS	Total
22–28 March 2021	2021 World Championships	19; 59.65	12; 121.82	14; 181.47
19–21 February 2021	2021 Tallink Hotels Cup	1; 63.56	1; 126.67	1; 190.23
30–31 January 2021	2021 Estonian Championships	3; 55.83	1; 120.97	1; 176.80
20–22 November 2020	2020 Rostelecom Cup	9; 57.88	5; 128.12	6; 186.00
15–17 October 2020	2020 CS Budapest Trophy	2; 65.37	2; 118.90	2; 184.27
23–26 September 2020	2020 CS Nebelhorn Trophy	3; 60.49	1; 113.04	1; 173.53
2019–2020 season
Date	Event	SP	FS	Total
13–16 February 2020	2020 Tallink Hotels Cup	2; 64.94	3; 113.31	2; 178.25
20–26 January 2020	2020 European Championships	11; 59.70	5; 121.54	7; 181.24
13–15 December 2019	2020 Estonian Championships	1; 63.07	1; 120.65	1; 183.72
4–7 December 2019	2019 CS Golden Spin of Zagreb	18; 46.20	9; 102.46	11; 148.66
11–13 October 2019	2019 CS Finlandia Trophy	5; 59.84	6; 102.93	6; 162.77
25–28 September 2019	2019 CS Nebelhorn Trophy	10; 50.14	4; 115.96	6; 166.10
2018–2019 season
Date	Event	SP	FS	Total
18–24 March 2019	2019 World Championships	23; 55.38	22; 94.61	22; 149.99
22–24 February 2019	2019 Tallink Hotels Cup	1; 56.59	1; 95.64	1; 152.23
14–16 December 2018	2019 Estonian Championships	4; 46.28	1; 110.56	2; 156.84
26–29 November 2018	2018 Tallinn Trophy	15; 46.58	14; 90.67	14; 137.25
6–11 November 2018	2018 Volvo Open Cup	5; 52.53	9; 90.80	7; 143.33
4–7 October 2018	2018 CS Finlandia Trophy	16; 45.65	9; 105.37	14; 151.02
12–16 September 2018	2018 CS Lombardia Trophy	11; 48.43	13; 81.66	14; 130.09
2017–2018 season
Date	Event	SP	FS	Total
15–18 March 2018	2018 Tallink Hotels Cup	1; 41.02	1; 83.79	1; 124.81
9–10 December 2017	2018 Estonian Championships	3; 48.63	3; 98.90	3; 147.53

=== Junior level ===
2019–2020 season
Date	Event	SP	FS	Total
10–15 January 2020	2020 Winter Youth Olympics	14; 46.63	12; 92.07	14; 138.70
2–5 October 2019	2019 JGP Italy	3; 59.78	8; 96.44	8; 156.22
11–14 September 2019	2019 JGP Russia	8; 54.01	7; 100.33	7; 154.34
2018–2019 season
Date	Event	SP	FS	Total
4–10 March 2019	2019 World Junior Championships	26; 45.67	–	26; 45.67
13–14 February 2019	2019 European Youth Olympic Festival	5; 54.21	4; 101.72	4; 155.93
5–6 January 2019	2019 Estonian Junior Championships	1; 57.14	2; 98.63	1; 155.77
5–8 September 2018	2018 JGP Lithuania	14; 42.62	12; 86.89	13; 129.51
2017–2018 season
Date	Event	SP	FS	Total
22–25 February 2018	2018 Challenge Cup	13; 40.78	9; 80.10	11; 120.88
2–4 February 2018	2018 Estonian Junior Championships	2; 48.14	3; 85.56	2; 133.70
20–26 November 2017	2017 Tallinn Trophy	11; 42.33	4; 95.28	5; 137.61
10–12 November 2017	2017 Prague Ice Cup	3; 45.77	6; 64.04	6; 109.81
20–22 October 2017	2017 Kaunas Ice Autumn Cup	4; 40.81	1; 74.34	3; 115.15
