= Volodymyr Byelikov =

Ukrainian ice dancer (born 1998)

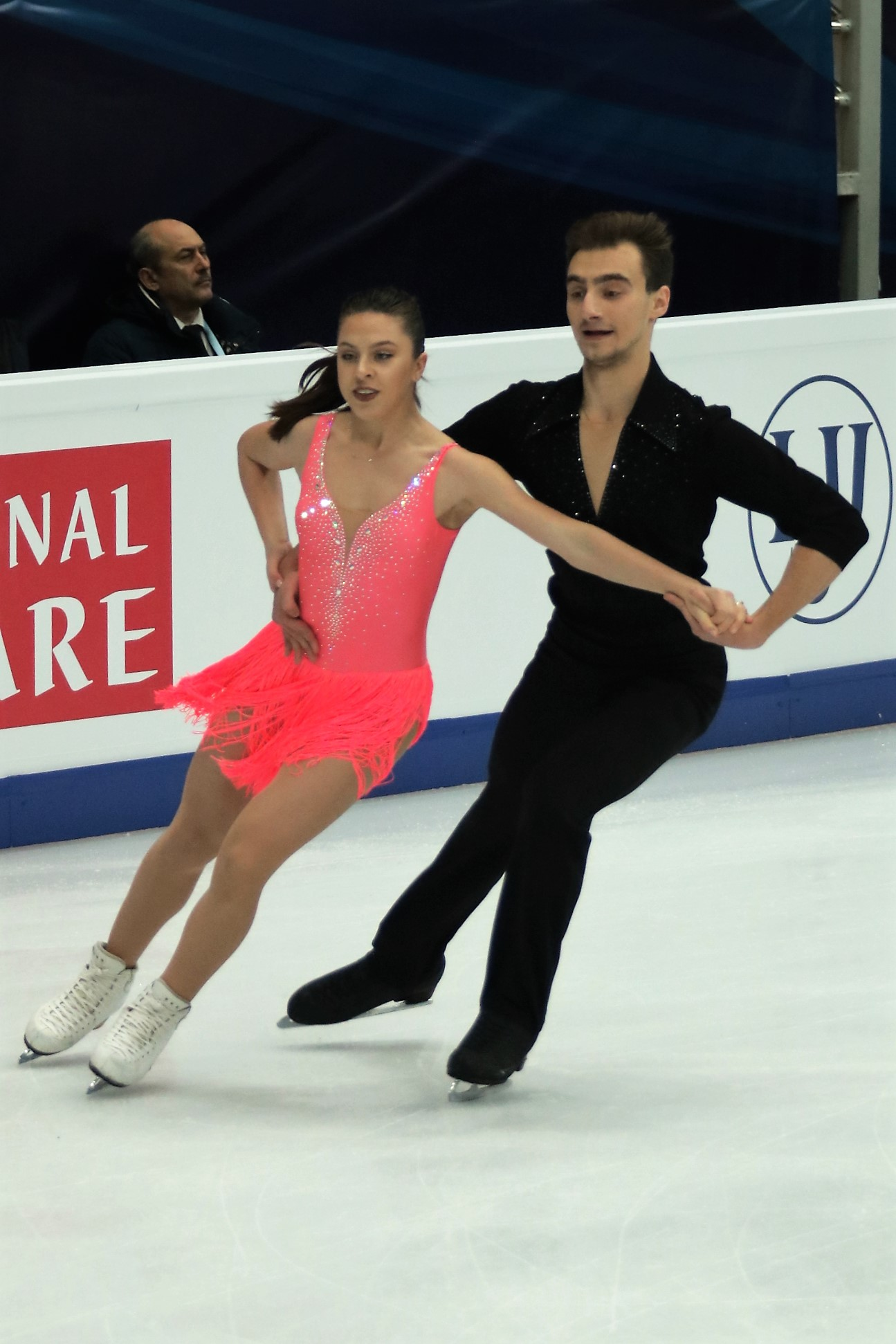
- Popova/Byelikov at the 2018 European Championships

Personal information
- Native name: Володимир Бєліков
- Born: 1 December 1998 (age 27) Kharkiv, Ukraine
- Height: 1.87 m (6 ft 1 1/2 in)

Figure skating career
- Country: Ukraine
- Coach: Halyna Churylova, Mariana Kozlova
- Skating club: Kolos Kharkiv
- Began skating: 2004

Volodymyr Byelikov (Ukrainian: Володимир Едуардович Бєліков; born 1 December 1998) is a Ukrainian ice dancer who most recently competed for Israel with Shira Ichilov. With his former skating partner, Darya Popova, he is the 2017 Volvo Open Cup silver medalist and 2019 Ukrainian national champion on the senior level. The team has finished within the top twelve at two World Junior Championships (2017, 2018).

== Career ==
=== Early years ===
Byelikov began learning to skate in 2004. He skated with Anna Demidenko before teaming up with Anzhelika Yurchenko in 2013. Yurchenko/Byelikov's first international junior competition was the NRW Trophy in November 2013. In August 2014, they debuted on the ISU Junior Grand Prix (JGP) series, placing 13th in Courchevel, France. They received a total of four JGP assignments and achieved their best result, 8th, in August 2015 in Riga, Latvia.

After winning gold at the 2016 Ukrainian Junior Championships, Yurchenko/Byelikov represented Ukraine at the 2016 Winter Youth Olympics, held in February in Hamar, Norway. They ranked fifth in both segments and fifth overall. In March, the two competed at the 2016 World Junior Championships in Debrecen, Hungary. They placed 15th in the short dance, 16th in the free dance, and 15th overall. Halyna Churylova and Mariana Kozlova coached the team in Kharkiv.

=== 2016–2017 season ===
Byelikov and Darya Popova teamed up in 2016, coached by Halyna Churylova and Mariana Kozlova in Kharkiv. They made their international debut at the ISU Junior Grand Prix in the Czech Republic in early September 2016. They placed 8th in Ostrava and 7th at their next JGP assignment, in Tallinn, Estonia. The duo took silver at the senior-level Ukrainian Championship before winning gold at the junior event.

Popova/Byelikov were selected to represent Ukraine at the 2017 World Junior Championships in Taipei, Taiwan; they placed 11th in the short dance, 12th in the free dance, and 12th overall.

=== 2017–2018 season ===
During the 2017 JGP series, Popova/Byelikov placed 6th competing in September in Minsk, Belarus, and 5th in early October in Gdańsk, Poland. Their senior international debut came in November at the Volvo Open Cup in Riga, Latvia. They won silver at the event, finishing second to Germany's Katharina Müller / Tim Dieck and ahead of Hungary's Anna Yanovskaya / Ádám Lukács.

Continuing on the senior level, Popova/Byelikov placed 9th at the 2017 CS Tallinn Trophy, 8th at the Santa Claus Cup, and second at the Ukrainian Championships. They were included in Ukraine's team to the 2018 European Championships, held in January in Moscow, but did not reach the free dance, placing 22nd in the short. In March, they competed at the 2018 World Junior Championships in Sofia (Bulgaria), ranking 9th in the short, 11th in the free, and 11th overall.

=== 2018–2019 season ===
Popova/Byelikov won bronze at their first 2018 Junior Grand Prix event in Lithuania, and then placed fourth in Slovenia. Following that, they competed at the 2018 CS Tallinn Trophy, placing fifth, and won their first Ukrainian national title. After a sixteenth-place finish at the 2019 European Championships, they competed at the 2019 World Junior Championships, placing eleventh.

=== 2019–2020 season ===
Competing in two Challenger events, Popova/Byelikov placed twelfth at the 2019 CS Nebelhorn Trophy and tenth at the 2019 CS Golden Spin of Zagreb. They won the silver medal at the Ukrainian championships, and competed at a number of minor internationals.

=== 2020–2021 season ===
Beginning the season at the 2020 CS Nebelhorn Trophy, which due to the COVID-19 pandemic was attended only by European skaters. They won the bronze medal.

=== 2021–2022 season ===
Following the dissolution of his partnership with Popova, Byelikov formed a new partnership with Israeli ice dancer Shira Ichilov to represent her country. They debuted at the Israeli championships, winning the silver medal, before earning their international minimums at the Bavarian Open, placing sixth. They were fourth at the Egna Trophy, before making their World Championship debut at the 2022 World Championships in Montpellier. They placed twenty-first, and were the first team to miss qualifying for the free dance.

== Programs ==
=== With Ichilov ===
Season	Rhythm dance	Free dance
2021–2022	Rock: Robot Rock; Blues: I Feel It Coming; Funk: Stronger by Daft Punk choreo. by Galit Chait	S.O.S. d'un terrien en détresse (from Starmania) by Michel Berger & Luc Plamondon performed by Grégory Lemarchal choreo. by Galit Chait

=== With Popova ===
Season	Rhythm dance	Free dance
2019–2021	Blues: Hopelessly Devoted to You; Quickstep: You're the One That I Want (from Grease) by John Farrar	Believer performed by Simply Three; I Can't Go On Without You by Kaleo
2018–2019	Waltz: Larrons en foire (from Micmacs) by Raphaël Beau; Tango	Chopin Nocturne performed by David Garrett; Run by Ludovico Einaudi
	Short dance	
2017–2018	Junior level: Salsa: Salsa en la Calle; Rhumba: Casi un Bolero by Ricky Martin; Merengue: Can, Can, Can by Los Reyes del Ritmo; Senior level: Cha Cha: Bla Bla Bla Cha Cha Cha by Petty Booka; Merengue: Can Can Can by Los Reyes del Ritmo	Once Upon a Time in Mexico by Robert Rodriguez
2016–2017	Blues: Save My Soul; Swing: Cinnamon Girls by Big Bad Voodoo Daddy	Code Name Vivaldi; Adagio by Tomaso Albinoni; Storm by Antonio Vivaldi performed by Vanessa-Mae

=== With Yurchenko ===
Season	Short dance	Free dance
2015–2016	Foxtrot: Celtic Tiger by Ronan Hardiman; Waltz: Where I Wanna Be by Dexter Gordon	Paganini by Vanessa-Mae; The Devil's Violinist by David Garrett, Niccolò Paganini
2014–2015	Samba Vocalizado by Luciano Perroni; Cha Cha Cha: Sweet Dreams; Samba Vocalizado by Luciano Perroni	Maybe I, Maybe You by the Scorpions; Fighting the Darkness by Primal Fear
2013–2014	Take My Love	Be Italian (from Nine (musical))

== Competitive highlights ==
CS: Challenger Series; JGP: Junior Grand Prix

=== With Ichilov for Israel ===
International
Event	21–22
Worlds	21st
Bavarian Open	6th
Egna Trophy	4th
National
Israeli Champ.	2nd
TBD = Assigned; WD = Withdrew

=== With Popova for Ukraine ===
International
Event	16–17	17–18	18–19	19–20	20–21
European Champ.		22nd	16th		
CS Golden Spin				10th	
CS Nebelhorn Trophy				12th	3rd
CS Tallinn Trophy		9th	5th		
CS Warsaw Cup				7th	
Mentor Toruń Cup				5th	
NRW Trophy				2nd	
Santa Claus Cup		8th			
Volvo Open Cup		2nd		4th	
Winter Star					1st
International: Junior
World Junior Champ.	12th	11th	11th		
JGP Belarus		6th			
JGP Czech Republic	8th				
JGP Estonia	7th				
JGP Lithuania			3rd		
JGP Poland		5th			
JGP Slovenia			4th		
Jégvirág Cup	1st				
NRW Trophy	4th				
National
Ukrainian Champ.	2nd	2nd	1st	2nd	
Ukrainian Junior Champ.	1st	1st			
J = Junior level

=== With Yurchenko for Ukraine ===
International
Event	13–14	14–15	15–16
World Junior Champ.			15th
Youth Olympics			5th
JGP France		13th	
JGP Latvia			8th
JGP Poland			9th
JGP Slovenia		12th	
Ice Star			3rd J
NRW Trophy	8th J	8th J	4th J
Santa Claus Cup	10th J		3rd J
National
Ukrainian Junior Champ.		3rd	1st
J = Junior level
