= Júlia Láng =

Hungarian figure skater (born 2003)

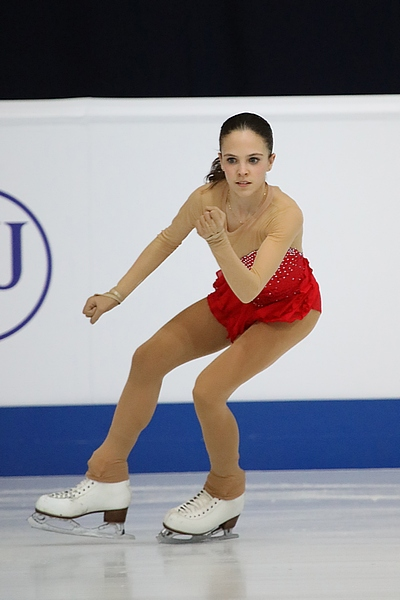
- Júlia Láng at 2019 Junior Worlds

Personal information
- Born: 6 November 2003 (age 22) Budapest, Hungary
- Home town: Budapest
- Height: 1.52 m (5 ft 0 in)

Figure skating career
- Country: Hungary
- Coach: Angelina Turenko; Alisa Mikonsaari
- Skating club: Sebestyén KSE
- Began skating: 2009
- Retired: November 17, 2024

Júlia Láng (born 6 November 2003) is a Hungarian figure skater. She has represented her country at two (2018, 2019) Junior World Championships and three (2021, 2022, 2023) Senior World Championships. Láng is a four-time Hungarian national champion (2018, 2021–23). She is known for her signature move, a highly flexible layback slide variation performed while holding the blade, which she was the first to introduce in international competition. She was first documented performing the move in practice on July 17, 2017. After a long break in competitions, she announced an attempt to return into the pairs category with Italy's Filippo Clerici skating for Hungary in 2026.

== Career ==
=== 2017–2018 season ===
Láng made her debut in the ISU Junior Grand Prix series at the 2017 event in Salzburg, where she also performed her signature slide move for the first time in competition. In January 2018 Láng became the junior national champion. In March, she represented Hungary at the 2018 World Junior Championships in Sofia, Bulgaria. Ranked thirty-second in the short, she did not advance to the free skate.

=== 2018–2019 season ===
In the 2018–2019 season, Láng competed in the ISU Junior Grand Prix series, placing twelfth in the 2018 JGP Slovakia and tenth in the 2018 JGP Slovenia.

In March 2019, she represented Hungary at the 2019 World Junior Championships in Zagreb, Croatia. Ranked tenth in the short, she vaulted into the penultimate (second-to-last) group for the free skate, where she placed fourteenth, falling to fourteenth overall.

=== 2019–2020 season ===
Láng competed at both the 2019 JGP USA in Lake Placid and at 2019 JGP Russia in Chelyabinsk, placing tenth and eleventh, respectively.

In senior competition, she placed fifteenth in the 2019 CS Nebelhorn Trophy and competed at several minor senior events.

=== 2020–2021 season ===
With the COVID-19 pandemic affecting international competition, Láng nevertheless competed at several European international competitions. She was chosen as Hungary's entry for the 2021 World Championships in Stockholm, where she finished in thirtieth place.

=== 2021–2022 season ===
Láng began the season competing at the 2021 CS Nebelhorn Trophy to attempt again to qualify a berth for Hungary at the 2022 Winter Olympics. She placed sixteenth at the event, outside of the range of qualification. She was thirteenth at the Budapest Trophy, before medaling at several minor international events, including a gold at the Jégvirág Cup. Competing at the 2023 Four National Championships, she finished third overall in the standings and first among Hungarians, winning her second senior national title. She took the bronze medal at the International Challenge Cup. She was thirty-first at the 2022 World Championships.

=== 2022–2023 season ===
Making her season debut on home ice at the 2022 CS Budapest Trophy, Láng finished in fourth position. She went on to place tenth at the Volvo Open Cup and was only seventeenth at the 2022 CS Ice Challenge shortly afterward before placing fourth at the Santa Claus Cup. Competing at the 2023 Four National Championships, she finished third overall in the standings and first among Hungarians, winning her third consecutive national title.

At the 2023 European Championships in Espoo, Finland, Láng finished in twenty-third place. Following this event, Láng relocated from Budapest to Egna, Italy to train at the Young Goose Academy with Angelina Turenko, Alisa Mikonsaari, Lorenzo Magri, and Eva Martinek becoming her new coaches.

Going on to compete at the 2023 International Challenge Cup, Láng finished the event in eighteenth place.

At the 2023 World Championships in Saitama, Japan, Láng placed thirty-fourth in the short program, failing to advance to the free skate segment of the competition.

== Programs ==
Season	Short program	Free skating
2023–2024	The Road by Balázs Havasi choreo. by Adam Solya	A Evaristo Carriego by Osvaldo Pugliese performed by Forever Tango; Grand Guignol by Bajofondo choreo. by Adam Solya
2022–2023	I Dreamed a Dream (from Les Misérables) by Claude-Michel Schönberg & Herbert Kretzmer performed by Idina Menzel & Lea Michelle choreo. by Eteri Tutberidze and Daniil Gleikhengauz	A Evaristo Carriego by Osvaldo Pugliese performed by Forever Tango; Grand Guignol by Bajofondo choreo. by Adam Solya
2021–2022	I Dreamed a Dream (from Les Misérables) by Claude-Michel Schönberg & Herbert Kretzmer performed by Idina Menzel & Lea Michelle choreo. by Eteri Tutberidze and Daniil Gleikhengauz	Kincsem by Róbert Hrutka choreo. by Patrícia Pavuk
2020–2021	And the Waltz Goes On by Anthony Hopkins choreo. by Patrícia Pavuk	Kincsem by Róbert Hrutka choreo. by Patrícia Pavuk
2019–2020	Romeo and Juliet by Sergei Prokofiev	Malagueña by Ernesto Lecuona performed by Stanley Black
2018–2019	Masquerade Waltz by Aram Khachaturian	Malagueña by Ernesto Lecuona performed by Stanley Black
2017–2018	Masquerade Waltz by Aram Khachaturian	Moonlight Sonata by Ludwig van Beethoven

== Competitive highlights ==
CS: Challenger Series; JGP: Junior Grand Prix

International
Event	17–18	18–19	19–20	20–21	21–22	22–23
Worlds				30th	31st	34rd
Europeans						23rd
CS Budapest				4th		4th
CS Ice Challenge						17th
CS Nebelhorn			15th	WD	16th	
CS Nepela Memorial						WD
Bavarian Open			4th			
Budapest					13th	
Celje Open				4th		
Challenge Cup			6th	9th	3rd	18th
Halloween Cup			2nd			
Jégvirág Cup			1st		1st	
Santa Claus Cup			2nd	1st	3rd	4th
Skate Helena			2nd		2nd	
Volvo Open Cup			14th		8th	10th
International: Junior
Junior Worlds	32nd	14th				
JGP Austria	22nd					
JGP Slovakia		12th				
JGP Slovenia		10th				
JGP U.S.			10th			
JGP Russia			11th			
EYOF		13th				
Bavarian Open	9th					
Christmas Cup		3rd				
GP Bratislava	1st	2nd				
Halloween Cup	1st	4th				
Ice Challenge (Leo Scheu)	3rd					
Jégvirág Cup	2nd					
Santa Claus Cup	4th					
Skate Helena		2nd				
Triglav Trophy	3rd					
Volvo Open Cup		4th				
National
Hungarian Champ.	1st J	2nd J		1st	1st	1st

== Detailed results ==
=== Senior level ===
2022–2023 season
Date	Event	SP	FS	Total
March 22–26, 2023	2023 World Championships	33; 44.26	-	33; 44.26
January 25–29, 2023	2023 European Championships	23; 46.33	23; 83.95	23; 130.28
December 15–17, 2022	2023 Four National Championships	3; 51.04	3; 112.17	3; 163.21
Nov. 28 – Dec. 4, 2022	2022 Santa Claus Cup	2; 54.37	5; 89.15	4; 143.52
November 9–13, 2022	2022 CS Ice Challenge	20; 44.25	16; 89.92	17; 134.17
November 2–6, 2022	47th Volvo Open Cup	7; 49.68	10; 88.65	10; 138.33
October 13–16, 2022	2022 CS Budapest Trophy	2; 58.65	5; 106.42	4; 165.07
2021–22 season
Date	Event	SP	FS	Total
March 21–27, 2022	2022 World Championships	31; 47.93	-	31; 47.93
February 24–27, 2022	2022 Challenge Cup	2; 58.46	3; 110.08	3; 168.54
December 17–18, 2021	2022 Four National Championships	4; 54.86	2; 113.21	3; 168.07
December 6–12, 2021	2021 Santa Claus Cup	4; 52.25	3; 101.36	3; 153.61
October 14–17, 2021	2021 Budapest Trophy	10; 50.11	13; 87.70	13; 137.81
September 22–25, 2021	2021 CS Nebelhorn Trophy	24; 45.22	12; 100.42	16; 145.64
2020–21 season
Date	Event	SP	FS	Total
March 22–28, 2021	2021 World Championships	30; 54.20	-	30; 54.20
February 25–28, 2021	2021 International Challenge Cup	14; 48.17	7; 101.60	9; 149.77
December 18–19, 2020	2021 Hungarian National Championships	1; 61.61	1; 100.66	1; 162.27
October 15–17, 2020	2020 Budapest Trophy	4; 58.20	4; 108.35	4; 166.55
2019–2020 season
Date	Event	SP	FS	Total
February 20–23, 2020	2020 Challenge Cup	12; 52.31	5; 107.35	6; 159.66
February 14–16, 2020	2020 Jégvirág Cup	1; 52.68	1; 96.92	1; 149.60
February 3–9, 2020	2020 Bavarian Open	6; 51.29	3; 107.11	4; 158.40
January 14–18, 2020	2020 Skate Helena	4; 46.83	1; 92.46	2; 139.29
December 2–8, 2019	2017 Santa Claus Cup	2; 50.39	1; 89.43	2; 139.82
November 6–10, 2019	2019 Volvo Open Cup	10; 50.39	14; 89.43	14; 139.82
October 17–20, 2019	2019 International Halloween Cup	5; 51.60	2; 98.11	2; 149.71
September 25–28, 2019	2019 Nebelhorn Trophy	18; 41.95	12; 90.62	15; 132.57

=== Junior level ===
2019–2020 season
Date	Event	SP	FS	Total
September 11–14, 2019	2018 JGP Russia	15; 46.19	9; 97.25	11; 143.44
August 28–31, 2019	2018 JGP United States	12; 50.95	11; 83.84	10; 134.79
2018–2019 season
Date	Event	SP	FS	Total
March 5–11, 2019	2019 World Junior Championships	10; 55.86	14; 97.38	14; 153.24
February 13–14, 2019	2019 EYOF	7; 50.78	22; 67.78	13; 118.56
February 1–3, 2019	2019 Hungarian Junior Championships	1; 56.34	4; 84.53	2; 140.87
January 15–19, 2019	2019 Skate Helena	3; 48.60	1; 97.82	2; 146.42
December 14–16, 2018	2018 Grand Prix of Bratislava	1; 52.36	2; 97.60	2; 149.96
Nov. 29 – Dec. 2, 2018	2018 Christmas Cup	3; 51.52	5; 81.34	3; 132.86
November 7–11, 2018	2018 Volvo Open Cup	5; 46.48	2; 92.86	4; 139.14
October 19–21, 2018	2018 International Halloween Cup	3; 48.38	5; 88.61	4; 136.99
October 3–6, 2018	2018 JGP Slovenia	10; 46.67	10; 92.79	10; 139.46
August 22–25, 2018	2018 JGP Slovakia	12; 48.42	13; 83.03	12; 131.45
2017–2018 season
Date	Event	SP	FS	Total
April 4–8, 2018	2018 Triglav Trophy	3; 42.87	3; 81.79	3; 124.66
March 5–11, 2018	2018 World Junior Championships	32; 42.00	-	32; 42.00
February 16–18, 2018	2018 Jégvirág Cup	2; 49.10	3; 80.20	2; 129.30
January 26–31, 2018	2018 Bavarian Open	9; 46.12	10; 87.07	9; 133.20
January 6, 2018	2018 Hungarian Junior Championships	1; 48.11	1; 96.53	1; 144.64
December 15–17, 2017	2017 Grand Prix of Bratislava	1; 44.26	1; 82.91	1; 127.17
December 4–10, 2017	2017 Santa Claus Cup	10; 40.16	2; 87.48	4; 127.64
November 20–25, 2017	2017 Cup of Tyrol	15; 41.99	8; 81.92	9; 123.91
November 8–12, 2017	2017 Leo Schenu Memorial	3; 45.55	3; 77.45	3; 123.00
October 21–23, 2017	2017 International Halloween Cup	1; 43.93	2; 77.89	1; 121.82
Aug. 30 – Sept. 2, 2017	2017 JGP Austria	24; 36.61	21; 66.95	22; 103.56
