= 2018–19 national figure skating championships =

- Type: National
- Season: 2018–19
- Previous: 2017–18
- Next: 2019–20

National figure skating championships of the 2018–19 season are taking place mainly between December 2018 and January 2019. They are held to crown national champions and may serve as part of the selection process for international events such as the 2019 ISU Figure Skating Championships and the 2019 Winter Universiade. Medals may be awarded in the disciplines of men's singles, ladies' singles, pair skating, and ice dancing. A few countries chose to organize their national championships together with their neighbors; the results were subsequently divided into national podiums.

== Competitions ==
Key
Nationals	Other domestic

Date	Event	Type	Level	Disc.	Location	Refs
27–28 July	Chinese Taipei Championships	Nat.	Sen.-Nov.	M/L	Taipei, Taiwan	
25–27 September	Master's de Patinage	Other	Sen.-Jun.	All	Villard-de-Lans, France	
6–9 October	New Zealand Championships	Nat.	Sen.-Nov.	M/L/D	Auckland, New Zealand	
19–21 October	Japan Novice Champ.	Nat.	Novice	M/L/D	Osaka, Japan	
26–28 October	Romanian Champ.	Nat.	Senior	M/L	Otopeni, Romania	
16–17 November	Belgian Championships	Nat.	Sen.-Nov.	M/L	Leuven, Belgium	
16–18 November	Bulgarian Championships	Nat.	Sen.-Nov.	M/L	Sofia, Bulgaria	
23–25 November	Japan Junior Champ.	Nat.	Junior	M/L/D	Fukuoka, Japan	
26 Nov. – 1 Dec.	British Championships	Nat.	Sen.-Nov.	All	Sheffield, England	
28 Nov. – 2 Dec.	Skate Canada Challenge	Other	Sen.-Nov.	All	Edmonton, Alberta, Canada	
30 Nov. – 7 Dec.	Australian Championships	Nat.	Sen.-Nov.	All	Macquarie Park, Australia	
1–2 December	Lithuanian Championships	Nat.	Sen.-Nov.	M/L	Elektrėnai, Lithuania	
13–15 December	French Championships	Nat.	Senior	All	Vaujany, France	
13–16 December	Italian Championships	Nat.	Sen.-Jun.	All	Trento, Italy	
13–16 December	Swedish Championships	Nat.	Sen.-Nov.	M/L	Karlskrona, Sweden	
13–16 December	Austrian Championships	Nat.	Sen.-Nov.	All	Gmunden, Austria	
14–15 December	Four Nationals (Czech/Slovak/Polish/Hungarian)	Nat.	Senior	M/L/D	Budapest, Hungary	
14–16 December	Estonian Championships	Nat.	Senior	M/L/D	Tallinn, Estonia	
14–16 December	Swiss Championships	Nat.	Senior	All	Wetzikon, Switzerland	
15–16 December	Belarusian Championships	Nat.	Senior	M/L/D	Minsk, Belarus	
15–16 December	Finnish Championships	Nat.	Sen.-Jun.	M/L/D	Kouvola, Finland	
15–16 December	Latvian Championships	Nat.	Sen.-Nov.	M/L	Mārupe, Latvia	
15–16 December	Slovenian Championships	Nat.	Sen.-Nov.	M/L	Bled, Slovenia	
15–16 December	Spanish Championships	Nat.	Sen.-Nov.	All	Logroño, Spain	
18–20 December	Ukrainian Championships	Nat.	Senior	All	Kyiv, Ukraine	
19–23 December	Russian Championships	Nat.	Senior	All	Saransk, Russia	
20–24 December	Japan Championships	Nat.	Senior	All	Osaka, Japan	
21–23 December	Turkish Championships	Nat.	Sen.-Nov.	M/L	Kocaeli, Turkey	
29–30 December	Chinese Championships	Nat.	Senior	All	Harbin, China	
4-6 January	Norwegian Championships	Nat.	Sen.-Nov.	M/L	Hamar, Norway	
11–13 January	South Korean Championships	Nat.	Sen.-Nov.	M/L/D	Seoul, South Korea	
13–20 January	Canadian Championships	Nat.	Sen.-Nov.	All	Saint John, New Brunswick, Canada	
19–27 January	U.S. Championships	Nat.	Sen.-Nov.	All	Detroit, Michigan, U.S.	
1–4 February	Russian Junior Championships	Nat.	Jun.	All	Perm, Russia	
Levels: Sen. = Senior; Jun. = Junior; Nov. = Novice; Disciplines: M = Men's singles; L = Ladies' singles; P = Pair skating; D = Ice dancing; All = All four disciplines

== Senior medalists ==
=== Men's singles ===
Nation	Gold	Silver	Bronze	Refs
Australia	Brendan Kerry	Andrew Dodds	James Min	
Austria	Maurizio Zandron	Luc Maierhofer	Albert Mück	
Azerbaijan	Vladimir Litvintsev	—N/a		
Belarus	Yakau Zenko	Yauhenii Puzanau	Mikalai Kazlou	
Belgium	—N/a			
Bulgaria	Niki-Leo Obreikov	Aleksandar Zlatkov	—N/a	
Canada	Nam Nguyen	Stephen Gogolev	Keegan Messing	
China	Jin Boyang	Zhang He	Liu Runqi	
Chinese Taipei	Tsao Chih-i	Chih-Sheng Chag	Micah Tang	
Czech Republic	Matyáš Bělohradský	Petr Kotlařík	Daniel Mrázek	
Denmark	Nikolaj Mølgaard Pedersen	—N/a		
Estonia	Mihhail Selevko	Daniel Albert Naurits	Aleksandr Selevko	
Finland	Roman Galay	Valtter Virtanen	—N/a	
France	Kévin Aymoz	Adam Siao Him Fa	Adrien Tesson	
Germany	Paul Fentz	Thomas Stoll	Catalin Dimitrescu	
Hungary	Alexander Borovoj	Alexander Maszljanko	András Csernoch	
Italy	Daniel Grassl	Matteo Rizzo	Mattia Dalla Torre	
Japan	Shoma Uno	Daisuke Takahashi	Keiji Tanaka	
Latvia	—N/a			
New Zealand	Brian Lee	—N/a		
Norway	Sondre Oddvoll Bøe	—N/a		
Poland	Ihor Reznichenko	Krzysztof Gała	Olgierd Febbi	
Romania	Andrei Tanase	Dorjan Kecskes	—N/a	
Russia	Maxim Kovtun	Mikhail Kolyada	Alexander Samarin	
Slovakia	Marco Klepoch	Michael Neuman	—N/a	
South Korea	Cha Jun-hwan	Lee June-hyoung	Lee Si-hyeong	
Spain	Hector Alonso Serrano	Javier Raya	—N/a	
Sweden	Alexander Majorov	Nikolaj Majorov	Natran Tzagai	
Switzerland	Lukas Britschgi	Nurullah Sahaka	Tomas Llorenc Guarino Sabate	
Turkey	Burak Demirboğa	—N/a		
Ukraine	Ivan Shmuratko	Andrii Kokura	Mykhailo Leiba	
United Kingdom	Graham Newberry	Peter James Hallam	Harry Mattick	
United States	Nathan Chen	Vincent Zhou	Jason Brown	

=== Women's singles ===
Nation	Gold	Silver	Bronze	Refs
Australia	Kailani Craine	Brooklee Han	Lucy Sori Yun	
Austria	Lara Roth	Sophia Schaller	Victoria Hübler	
Belarus	Aliaksandra Chepeleva	Mariya Saldakaeva	Elizaveta Hlypovka	
Belgium	Loena Hendrickx	Charlotte Vandersarren	Loïs Arickx	
Bulgaria	Alexandra Feigin	Kristina Grigorova	Svetoslava Ryadkova	
Canada	Alaine Chartrand	Aurora Cotop	Véronik Mallet	
China	Yi Christy Leung	An Xiangyi	Chen Hongyi	
Chinese Taipei	Amy Lin	Yuka Matsuura	Stephanie Chang	
Czech Republic	Eliška Březinová	Klára Štěpánová	Aneta Janiczková	
Denmark	Pernille Sørensen	Josephine Kærsgaard	Emma Frida Andersen	
Estonia	Gerli Liinamäe	Eva Lotta Kiibus	Kristina Škuleta-Gromova	
Finland	Viveca Lindfors	Emmi Peltonen	Jenni Saarinen	
France	Maé-Bérénice Méité	Laurine Lecavelier	Julie Froetscher	
Germany	Nicole Schott	Nathalie Weinzierl	Ann-Christin Marold	
Hungary	Ivett Tóth	Fruzsina Medgyesi	Kloé Rozgonyi	
Italy	Alessia Tornaghi	Lucrezia Beccari	Lara Naki Gutmann	
Japan	Kaori Sakamoto	Rika Kihira	Satoko Miyahara	
Latvia	Angelina Kučvaļska	Elizabete Jubkane	Anastasija Pavlovica	
New Zealand	Sarah Isabella Bardua	Brooke Tamepo	Jennifer Toms	
Norway	Camilla Gjersem	Marianne Stålen	Marie Hass	
Poland	Ekaterina Kurakova	Elżbieta Gabryszak	Magdalena Zawadzka	
Romania	Julia Sauter	Amanda Stan	Cristiana Mihaela Silca	
Russia	Anna Shcherbakova	Alexandra Trusova	Alena Kostornaia	
Serbia	Antonina Dubinina	Zona Apostolovic	—N/a	
Slovakia	Nicole Rajičová	Silvia Hugec	—N/a	
Slovenia	Daša Grm	Maruša Udrih	Nina Polšak	
South Korea	You Young	Lim Eun-soo	Lee Hae-in	
Spain	Valentina Matos	—N/a		
Sweden	Matilda Algotsson	Smilla Szalkai	Josefin Taljegård	
Switzerland	Alexia Paganini	Yasmine Yamada	Yoonmi Lehmann	
Turkey	Sıla Saygı	Sinem Kuyucu	Selin Hafızoğlu	
Ukraine	Anastasia Arkhipova	Anna Ivanchenko	Maryna Zhdanovych	
United Kingdom	Natasha McKay	Karly Robertson	Kristen Spours	
United States	Alysa Liu	Bradie Tennell	Mariah Bell	

=== Pairs ===
Nation	Gold	Silver	Bronze	Refs
Australia	Ekaterina Alexandrovskaya / Harley Windsor	—N/a		
Canada	Kirsten Moore-Towers / Michael Marinaro	Evelyn Walsh / Trennt Michaud	Camille Ruest / Andrew Wolfe	
China	Peng Cheng / Jin Yang	Wang Xuehan / Wang Lei	Tang Feiyao / Yang Yongchao	
France	Vanessa James / Morgan Ciprès	Cléo Hamon / Denys Strekalin	Camille Mendoza / Pavel Kovalev	
Germany	Minerva Fabienne Hase / Nolan Seegert	Annika Hocke / Ruben Blommaert	—N/a	
Italy	Nicole Della Monica / Matteo Guarise	Rebecca Ghilardi / Filippo Ambrosini	—N/a	
Japan	Miu Suzaki / Ryuichi Kihara	—N/a		
Russia	Evgenia Tarasova / Vladimir Morozov	Natalia Zabiiako / Alexander Enbert	Aleksandra Boikova / Dmitrii Kozlovskii	
South Korea				
Spain	Laura Barquero / Aritz Maestu Babarro	Dorota Broda / Pedro Betegón Martín	—N/a	
Switzerland	Alexandra Herbríková / Nicolas Roulet	—N/a		
Ukraine	Sofiia Nesterova / Artem Darenskyi	Viktoriia Bychkova / Ivan Khobta	Sofiia Holichenko / Ivan Pavlov	
United Kingdom	Zoe Jones / Christopher Boyadji	—N/a		
United States	Ashley Cain / Timothy LeDuc	Haven Denney / Brandon Frazier	Deanna Stellato / Nathan Bartholomay	

=== Ice dance ===
Nation	Gold	Silver	Bronze	Refs
Australia	Chantelle Kerry / Andrew Dodds	Matilda Friend / William Badaoui	India Nette / Eron Westwood	
Belarus	Anna Kublikova / Yuri Hulitski	Emiliya Kalehanova / Uladzislau Palkhouski	Karina Sidorenko / Maskim Elenich	
Canada	Kaitlyn Weaver / Andrew Poje	Piper Gilles / Paul Poirier	Laurence Fournier Beaudry / Nikolaj Sørensen	
China	Wang Shiyue / Liu Xinyu	Chen Hong / Sun Zhuoming	Ning Wanqi / Wang Chao	
Czech Republic	—N/a			
Finland	Juulia Turkkila / Matthias Versluis	—N/a		
France	Gabriella Papadakis / Guillaume Cizeron	Marie-Jade Lauriault / Romain Le Gac	Adelina Galyavieva / Louis Thauron	
Germany	Kavita Lorenz / Joti Polizoakis	Katharina Müller / Tim Dieck	Shari Koch / Christian Nüchtern	
Hungary	Anna Yanovskaya / Ádám Lukács			
Italy	Charlène Guignard / Marco Fabbri	Jasmine Tessari / Francesco Fioretti	Carolina Moscheni / Andrea Fabbri	
Japan	Misato Komatsubara / Tim Koleto	Kiria Hirayama / Axel Lamasse	Mio Iida / Kenta Ishibashi	
Poland	Natalia Kaliszek / Maksym Spodyriev	Justyna Plutowska / Jérémie Flemin	Jenna Hertenstein / Damian Binkowski	
Russia	Victoria Sinitsina / Nikita Katsalapov	Alexandra Stepanova / Ivan Bukin	Sofia Evdokimova / Egor Bazin	
Slovakia	—N/a			
South Korea				
Spain	Sara Hurtado / Kirill Khaliavin	Olivia Smart / Adrián Díaz	—N/a	
Sweden	—N/a			
Switzerland	Victoria Manni / Carlo Röthlisberger	Arianna Wróblewska / Stéphane Walker	—N/a	
Turkey	—N/a			
Ukraine	Darya Popova / Volodymyr Byelikov	Yuliia Zhata / Yan Lukouski	Alisa Lupashko / Vladyslav Khomenskyi	
United Kingdom	Lilah Fear / Lewis Gibson	Robynne Tweedale / Joseph Buckland	Eleanor Hirst / Anthony Currie	
United States	Madison Hubbell / Zachary Donohue	Madison Chock / Evan Bates	Kaitlin Hawayek / Jean-Luc Baker	

== Junior medalists ==
=== Ladies ===
Junior ladies
Nation	Gold	Silver	Bronze	Refs
Australia	Amelia Jackson	Luci Sori Yun	Romy Grogan	
Austria	Olga Mikutina	Stefanie Pesendorfer	Sophie-Laureen Günther	
Canada	Hannah Dawson	Madeline Schizas	Reagan Scott	
Chinese Taipei	Tzu-Han Ting	Mandy Chiang	Megan Ly	
Germany	Ann-Christin Marold	Elodie Eudine	Janne Salatzki	
Japan	Yuhana Yokoi	Nana Araki	Tomoe Kawabata	
Norway	Frida Turiddotter Berge	Silja Anna Skulstad Urang	Ingrid Louise Vestre	
Russia	Alexandra Trusova	Alena Kostornaia	Anna Shcherbakova	
South Korea	Park Yeon-jeong	Kim Min-chae	Kwak Mun-ju	
Switzerland	Nicole Zaika	Anna La Porta	Pauline Irman	
United Kingdom	Kristen Spours	Anastasia Vaipan-Law	Anna Litvinenko	
United States	Gabriella Izzo	Audrey Shin	Emilia Murdock	
