= 2018 CS Finlandia Trophy =

Figure skating competition

- Type: ISU Challenger Series
- Date: October 4 – 7
- Season: 2018–19
- Location: Espoo
- Host: Finnish Figure Skating Association
- Venue: Espoo Metro Areena

Champions
- Men's singles: (Russia) Mikhail Kolyada
- Ladies' singles: (Russia) Elizaveta Tuktamysheva
- Pairs: (Russia) Evgenia Tarasova / Vladimir Morozov
- Ice dance: (Russia) Alexandra Stepanova / Ivan Bukin
- Previous: 2017 CS Finlandia Trophy
- Next: 2019 CS Finlandia Trophy

The 2018 CS Finlandia Trophy was held in October 2018 in Espoo. It was part of the 2018–19 ISU Challenger Series. Medals were awarded in the disciplines of men's singles, ladies' singles, pair skating, and ice dancing.

== Entries ==
The International Skating Union published the list on entries on September 7, 2018.

| Country | Men | Ladies | Pairs | Ice dance |
|---|---|---|---|---|
| Australia | | | Ekaterina Alexandrovskaya / Harley Windsor | |
| Austria | | Sophia Schaller | Miriam Ziegler / Severin Kiefer | |
| Belarus | | Katsiarina Pakhamovich | | |
| Bulgaria | | | | Mina Zdravkova / Christopher M. Davis |
| Canada | Nicolas Nadeau | Véronik Mallet | Kirsten Moore-Towers / Michael Marinaro | Carolane Soucisse / Shane Firus |
| Czech Republic | Petr Kotlařík | Michaela Lucie Hanzlíková | | |
| Estonia | Daniel Albert Naurits | Eva Lotta Kiibus | | |
| Finland | Roman Galay; Valtter Virtanen | Viveca Lindfors; Emmi Peltonen | | Juulia Turkkila / Matthias Versluis |
| France | Luc Economides | | | Marie-Jade Lauriault / Romain Le Gac |
| Georgia | Morisi Kvitelashvili | | | |
| Germany | | Lutricia Bock | | |
| Hungary | | Ivett Tóth | | Emily Monaghan / Ilias Fourati; Anna Yanovskaya / Ádám Lukács |
| Israel | Alexei Bychenko | | | Shira Ichilov / Vadim Davidovich |
| Italy | Matteo Rizzo | | | |
| Japan | Ryuju Hino; Sōta Yamamoto | Rika Hongo | Miu Suzaki / Ryuichi Kihara | |
| Kazakhstan | | Elizabet Tursynbaeva | | |
| Norway | Sondre Oddvoll Bøe | Camilla Gjersem | | |
| Russia | Dmitri Aliev; Alexey Erokhov; Mikhail Kolyada | Stanislava Konstantinova; Elizaveta Tuktamysheva | Aleksandra Boikova / Dmitrii Kozlovskii; Daria Pavliuchenko / Denis Khodykin; Evgenia Tarasova / Vladimir Morozov | Sofia Evdokimova / Egor Bazin; Anastasia Shpilevaya / Grigory Smirnov; Alexandra Stepanova / Ivan Bukin |
| Serbia | | Antonina Dubinina | | |
| South Korea | Cha Jun-hwan | Choi Yu-jin; Kim Ha-nul | | |
| Spain | Javier Raya | Valentina Matos | Laura Barquero / Aritz Maestu | Olivia Smart / Adrián Díaz |
| Sweden | Alexander Majorov; Nikolaj Majorov | Anita Östlund | | |
| Switzerland | Lukas Britschgi | Yoonmi Lehmann | | |
| United Kingdom | Graham Newberry | Natasha McKay; Karly Robertson | | |
| United States | Alexander Johnson | Pooja Kalyan; Angela Wang | Tarah Kayne / Danny O'Shea; Jessica Pfund / Joshua Santillan | |

=== Changes to preliminary assignments ===
| Date | Discipline | Withdrew | Added | Reason/Other notes | Refs |
|---|---|---|---|---|---|
| September 11 | Ladies | (Russia) Maria Sotskova | (Russia) Stanislava Konstantinova | | |
| September 11 | Pairs | N/A | (Russia) Daria Pavliuchenko / Denis Khodykin | | |
| September 11 | Pairs | (United States) Audrey Lu / Misha Mitrofanov | (United States) Jessica Pfund / Joshua Santillan | | |
| September 19 | Ice dance | (Belarus) Anna Kublikova / Yuri Hulitski | (Russia) Anastasia Shpilevaya / Grigory Smirnov | | |
| September 19 | Ice dance | (Finland) Cecilia Törn / Jussiville Partanen | N/A | | |
| September 21 | Men | (United Kingdom) Phillip Harris | (United Kingdom) Graham Newberry | | |
| September 21 | Men | (Ukraine) Yaroslav Paniot | N/A | | |
| September 21 | Pairs | (Italy) Nicole Della Monica / Matteo Guarise | N/A | | |
| September 21 | Pairs | (United Kingdom) Zoe Jones / Christopher Boyadji | N/A | | |
| September 25 | Men | (Israel) Daniel Samohin | N/A | | |
| September 26 | Ice dance | (United States) Kaitlin Hawayek / Jean-Luc Baker | N/A | | |
| September 27 | Ladies | (United States) Emmy Ma | (United States) Pooja Kalyan | | |
| October 1 | Ice dance | (Spain) Sara Hurtado / Kirill Khaliavin | N/A | | |
| October 2 | Ladies | (France) Léa Serna | N/A | | |
| October 2 | Ladies | (Italy) Micol Cristini | N/A | | |
| October 2 | Ladies | (Philippines) Alisson Krystle Perticheto | N/A | | |
| October 4 | Ice dance | (Italy) Chiara Calderone / Pietro Papetti | N/A | | |

== Results ==
=== Men ===
| Rank | Name | Nation | Total points | SP | | FS | |
|---|---|---|---|---|---|---|---|
| 1 | Mikhail Kolyada | Russia | 250.58 | 1 | 85.20 | 1 | 165.38 |
| 2 | Cha Jun-hwan | South Korea | 239.19 | 2 | 84.67 | 2 | 154.52 |
| 3 | Morisi Kvitelashvili | Georgia | 231.19 | 5 | 77.52 | 3 | 153.67 |
| 4 | Nicolas Nadeau | Canada | 227.76 | 4 | 79.17 | 5 | 148.59 |
| 5 | Dmitri Aliev | Russia | 224.95 | 3 | 79.36 | 6 | 145.59 |
| 6 | Matteo Rizzo | Italy | 217.68 | 6 | 76.53 | 7 | 141.15 |
| 7 | Alexey Erokhov | Russia | 214.59 | 12 | 62.16 | 4 | 152.43 |
| 8 | Lukas Britschgi | Switzerland | 206.76 | 10 | 68.40 | 8 | 138.36 |
| 9 | Sōta Yamamoto | Japan | 205.79 | 8 | 72.16 | 10 | 133.63 |
| 10 | Ryuju Hino | Japan | 205.15 | 9 | 70.92 | 9 | 134.23 |
| 11 | Alexander Majorov | Sweden | 202.55 | 7 | 73.41 | 11 | 129.14 |
| 12 | Petr Kotlařík | Czech Republic | 181.51 | 11 | 62.86 | 13 | 118.65 |
| 13 | Luc Economides | France | 180.40 | 14 | 59.57 | 12 | 120.83 |
| 14 | Sondre Oddvoll Bøe | Norway | 179.25 | 13 | 60.61 | 14 | 118.64 |
| 15 | Alexander Johnson | United States | 178.03 | 15 | 59.42 | 15 | 118.61 |
| 16 | Daniel Albert Naurits | Estonia | 170.93 | 17 | 56.26 | 16 | 114.67 |
| 17 | Nikolaj Majorov | Sweden | 160.62 | 20 | 50.97 | 17 | 109.65 |
| 18 | Javier Raya | Spain | 160.40 | 18 | 55.51 | 18 | 104.89 |
| 19 | Valtter Virtanen | Finland | 153.17 | 16 | 59.18 | 21 | 93.99 |
| 20 | Graham Newberry | United Kingdom | 150.06 | 19 | 52.99 | 19 | 97.07 |
| 21 | Roman Galay | Finland | 145.83 | 21 | 48.99 | 20 | 96.84 |
| WD | Alexei Bychenko | Israel | withdrew | 22 | 46.90 | withdrew from competition | |

=== Ladies ===
| Rank | Name | Nation | Total points | SP | | FS | |
|---|---|---|---|---|---|---|---|
| 1 | Elizaveta Tuktamysheva | Russia | 202.85 | 1 | 73.83 | 3 | 129.02 |
| 2 | Elizabet Tursynbaeva | Kazakhstan | 200.74 | 2 | 70.95 | 1 | 129.79 |
| 3 | Viveca Lindfors | Finland | 187.19 | 6 | 57.69 | 2 | 129.50 |
| 4 | Stanislava Konstantinova | Russia | 187.13 | 3 | 65.39 | 4 | 121.74 |
| 5 | Emmi Peltonen | Finland | 172.02 | 4 | 60.48 | 8 | 111.54 |
| 6 | Véronik Mallet | Canada | 170.68 | 7 | 57.51 | 5 | 113.17 |
| 7 | Choi Yu-jin | South Korea | 162.80 | 11 | 50.62 | 7 | 112.18 |
| 8 | Angela Wang | United States | 160.99 | 13 | 48.36 | 6 | 112.63 |
| 9 | Pooja Kalyan | United States | 156.05 | 5 | 58.42 | 13 | 97.63 |
| 10 | Kim Ha-nul | South Korea | 153.22 | 9 | 53.76 | 11 | 99.46 |
| 11 | Karly Robertson | United Kingdom | 152.38 | 12 | 49.20 | 10 | 103.18 |
| 12 | Anita Östlund | Sweden | 151.69 | 10 | 52.91 | 12 | 98.78 |
| 13 | Ivett Tóth | Hungary | 151.19 | 8 | 55.57 | 14 | 95.62 |
| 14 | Eva Lotta Kiibus | Estonia | 151.02 | 16 | 45.65 | 9 | 105.37 |
| 15 | Valentina Matos | Spain | 135.16 | 14 | 48.14 | 17 | 87.02 |
| 16 | Rika Hongo | Japan | 133.66 | 15 | 46.54 | 16 | 87.12 |
| 17 | Yoonmi Lehmann | Switzerland | 133.08 | 18 | 44.84 | 15 | 88.24 |
| 18 | Sophia Schaller | Austria | 127.01 | 17 | 45.48 | 18 | 81.53 |
| 19 | Lutricia Bock | Germany | 123.87 | 21 | 42.83 | 19 | 81.04 |
| 20 | Natasha McKay | United Kingdom | 122.01 | 22 | 41.36 | 20 | 80.65 |
| 21 | Camilla Gjersem | Norway | 120.34 | 19 | 44.25 | 21 | 76.09 |
| 22 | Antonina Dubinina | Serbia | 118.40 | 20 | 43.06 | 22 | 75.34 |
| 23 | Michaela Lucie Hanzlíková | Czech Republic | 107.20 | 23 | 36.72 | 23 | 70.48 |
| 24 | Katsiarina Pakhamovich | Belarus | 88.34 | 24 | 32.60 | 24 | 55.74 |

=== Pairs ===
| Rank | Name | Nation | Total points | SP | | FS | |
|---|---|---|---|---|---|---|---|
| 1 | Evgenia Tarasova / Vladimir Morozov | Russia | 198.98 | 1 | 73.27 | 2 | 125.71 |
| 2 | Kirsten Moore-Towers / Michael Marinaro | Canada | 193.93 | 3 | 66.52 | 1 | 127.41 |
| 3 | Aleksandra Boikova / Dmitrii Kozlovskii | Russia | 188.54 | 2 | 67.81 | 3 | 120.73 |
| 4 | Miriam Ziegler / Severin Kiefer | Austria | 176.09 | 5 | 62.26 | 4 | 113.83 |
| 5 | Daria Pavliuchenko / Denis Khodykin | Russia | 175.05 | 4 | 63.47 | 5 | 111.58 |
| 6 | Ekaterina Alexandrovskaya / Harley Windsor | Australia | 162.78 | 6 | 62.22 | 7 | 100.56 |
| 7 | Tarah Kayne / Danny O'Shea | United States | 162.03 | 7 | 52.53 | 6 | 109.50 |
| 8 | Laura Barquero / Aritz Maestu | Spain | 152.94 | 8 | 52.46 | 8 | 100.48 |
| 9 | Jessica Pfund / Joshua Santillan | United States | 136.91 | 9 | 48.35 | 9 | 88.56 |
| 10 | Miu Suzaki / Ryuichi Kihara | Japan | 132.59 | 10 | 46.12 | 10 | 86.47 |

=== Ice dancing ===
| Rank | Name | Nation | Total points | SP | | FS | |
|---|---|---|---|---|---|---|---|
| 1 | Alexandra Stepanova / Ivan Bukin | Russia | 200.78 | 1 | 79.16 | 1 | 121.62 |
| 2 | Olivia Smart / Adrián Díaz | Spain | 180.07 | 2 | 72.61 | 2 | 107.46 |
| 3 | Marie-Jade Lauriault / Romain Le Gac | France | 176.46 | 4 | 69.29 | 3 | 107.17 |
| 4 | Carolane Soucisse / Shane Firus | Canada | 172.27 | 3 | 70.79 | 5 | 101.48 |
| 5 | Anastasia Shpilevaya / Grigory Smirnov | Russia | 167.94 | 5 | 64.33 | 4 | 103.61 |
| 6 | Juulia Turkkila / Matthias Versluis | Finland | 163.49 | 6 | 62.46 | 6 | 101.03 |
| 7 | Sofia Evdokimova / Egor Bazin | Russia | 159.67 | 7 | 61.33 | 7 | 98.34 |
| 8 | Anna Yanovskaya / Ádám Lukács | Hungary | 140.25 | 8 | 54.95 | 8 | 85.30 |
| 9 | Shira Ichilov / Vadim Davidovich | Israel | 130.60 | 9 | 47.45 | 9 | 83.15 |
| 10 | Emily Monaghan / Ilias Fourati | Hungary | 126.44 | 10 | 46.55 | 10 | 79.89 |
| 11 | Mina Zdravkova / Christopher M. Davis | Bulgaria | 103.85 | 11 | 37.84 | 11 | 66.01 |
