= Kristen Spours =

English figure skater (born 2000)

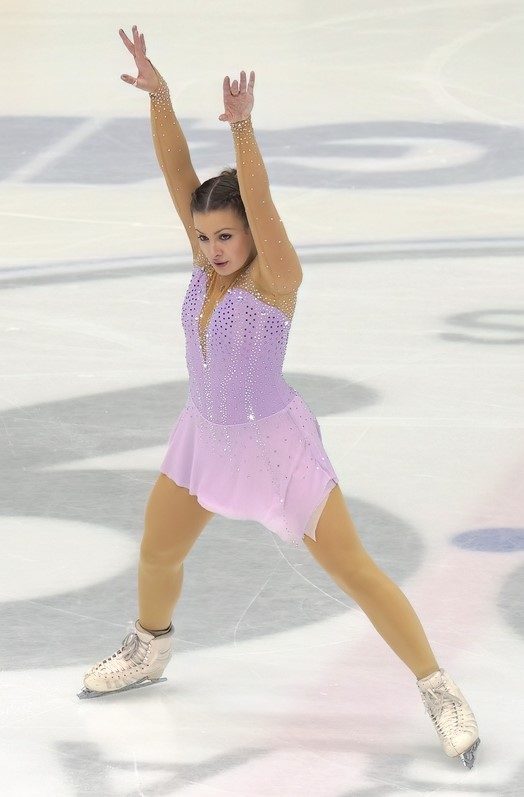
- Spours at the 2021 Cup of Austria

Personal information
- Other names: Kristen Reeds
- Born: 11 April 2000 (age 26) Kingston upon Thames, England, United Kingdom
- Home town: Woking, England
- Height: 1.63 m (5 ft 4 in)

Figure skating career
- Country: Great Britain
- Discipline: Women's singles
- Coach: Christopher Boyadji; Lloyd Jones
- Skating club: Swindon Ice Figure Club
- Began skating: 2006
- Retired: 25 March 2026

Medal record
British Championships
Gold medal – first place	2026 Sheffield	Singles
Gold medal – first place	2025 Sheffield	Singles
Silver medal – second place	2023 Sheffield	Singles
Silver medal – second place	2024 Sheffield	Singles
Bronze medal – third place	2018 Sheffield	Singles
Bronze medal – third place	2019 Sheffield	Singles

Kristen Spours (married name: Reeds; born 11 April 2000) is a British retired figure skater. She is a two-time British national champion (2025-26), has won 15 senior international medals, and competed at the 2026 Winter Olympics and three World Championships (2016, 2023, 2025). Spours also competed in the final segment at three World Junior Championships (2017, 2018, 2019).

She represented Great Britain at the 2026 Winter Olympics.

== Personal life ==
Spours was born on 11 April 2000 in Kingston upon Thames, England. She attended Howard of Effingham School.

She married her boyfriend, Corey Reeds, in October 2024.

== Career ==
=== Early years ===
Spours began learning to skate in 2006, having become interested after watching Dancing on Ice. In the 2012–2013 season, she won the novice bronze medal at the British Championships. Her first coach was Veronika Bogamolova before electing to train under Ruth Woodstock at Guildford Spectrum and Christian Newberry at the Lee Valley Ice Centre.

=== 2015–2016 season: Senior debut, World Championship debut ===
Making her first ISU Junior Grand Prix (JGP) appearance, Spours placed twenty-first in Bratislava, Slovakia. She then went on to make her senior international debut at the 2015 CS Finlandia Trophy, finishing fifteenth.

Spours finished fourth in the junior ladies' category at the British Championships. At the 2015 Jégvirág Cup, she won the gold medal and achieved the minimum technical scores to compete at the 2016 World Championships in Boston. As a result, she was named in the British team to senior Worlds, despite not appearing nationally on the senior level. She placed thirty-sixth in Boston.

=== 2016–2017 season ===
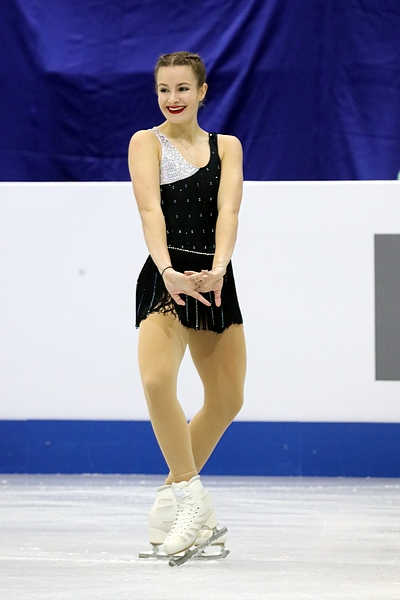
Spours at the 2017 World Junior Championships

Spours began the season by competing on the Junior Grand Prix series, finishing thirteenth at the 2016 JGP France. She then competed on the senior level at the 2016 CS Lombardia Trophy, where she placed twelfth.

Spours went on to win a silver at the Denkova-Staviski Cup and bronze at the Merano Cup on the senior levels, as well as a gold medal at the 2016 Grand Prix of Bratislava on the junior level. In December 2016, she won the junior ladies' title and placed fifth on the senior level at the 2017 British Championships. She then won the silver in the senior ladies' category at Skate Helena and finished tenth at the 2017 International Challenge Cup. In March, she placed sixteenth in the short program, fourteenth in the free skate, and fifteenth overall at the 2017 World Junior Championships in Taipei, Taiwan.

=== 2017–18 season ===
Competing on the Junior Grand Prix series, Spours placed thirteenth at 2017 JGP Austria and fourteenth at 2017 JGP Italy. Meanwhile, on the senior level, she would finish eighteenth at the 2017 CS Lombardia Trophy, fifth at the 2017 Golden Bear of Zagreb, and fourth at the 2017 Merano Cup. At the 2018 British Championships, Spours won her second consecutive national title on the junior level as well as won the bronze medal on the senior level.

Selected to compete at the 2018 World Junior Championships in Sofia, Bulgaria, Spours finished twenty-first.

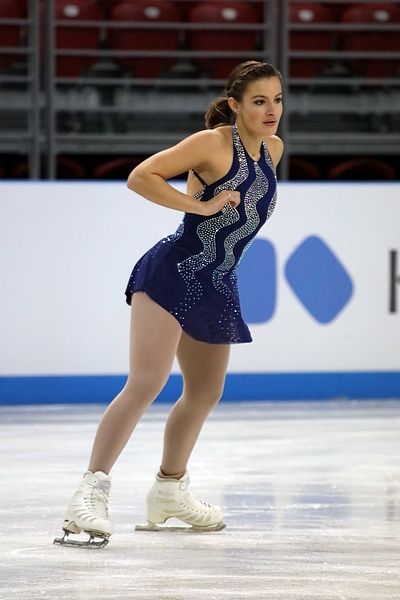
Spours at the 2018 Junior World Championships

Following the season, Spours left coach, Ruth Woodstock, to train at the Lee Valley Ice Centre full-time under Christian Newberry.

=== 2018–19 season ===
Spours began the season on the Junior Grand Prix series, finishing thirteenth at the 2018 JGP Slovakia. She then went on to win the bronze medal at the 2018 Volvo Open Cup on the senior level. At the 2019 British Championships, Spours won her third junior national title as well as her second consecutive bronze medal on the senior level. Spours would then go on to finish sixth on the senior level at the 2019 Dragon Trophy.

Competing at the 2019 World Junior Championships in Zagreb, Croatia, Spours finished twentieth.

Following the season, Spours relocated her training base to Vaujany, France, where Florent Amodio and Sofia Gassoumi became her new coaches.

=== 2019–20 season ===
Spours had to miss the whole 2019–20 figure skating season due to a spinal injury that she sustained while training in France, leaving her without feeling in her left leg. She stated that her doctors told her that she could either have them operate on her, which would mean the end of her figure skating career, or she could undergo physiotherapy, which would be a long process and might not work. Ultimately Spours chose to undergo physiotherapy, saying "If it gave me even a 10 per cent chance of skating again, then I was going to go for it."

Spours would spend two years doing physiotherapy and relearning how to skate.

=== 2020–21 season ===
Due to the COVID-19 pandemic, Spours only got the opportunity to compete at the 2020 CS Nebelhorn Trophy, finishing eleventh.

=== 2021–22 season ===
Prior to the start of the season, Spours made a coaching change, announcing that she would split her time training under Phillip Harris in Nottingham, England and Franca Bianconi and Ondřej Hotárek in Bergamo, Italy.

Spours began the season with a nineteenth-place finish at the 2021 CS Lombardia Trophy and eighth at the 2021 Budapest Trophy. She then went on to win the gold medal at the 2021 Tirnavia Ice Cup as well as place twenty-third at the 2021 CS Cup of Austria. At the 2022 British Championships, Spours finished fourth, before closing the season with a silver medal at the 2022 Triglav Trophy.

Following the season, Spours moved to Swindon, England, with Christopher Boyadji and Zoe Jones becoming her new coaches.

=== 2022–23 season ===
Spours began the season with a twelfth-place finish at the 2022 CS Nepela Memorial, a seventh-place finish at the 2022 Trophée Métropole Nice Côte d'Azur, and a thirteenth-place finish at the 2022 CS Ice Challenge. At the 2023 British Championships, Spours won the silver medal behind Natasha McKay. She then won the gold medal at the 2023 EduSport Trophy and placed thirteenth at the 2023 International Challenge Cup.

Selected to compete at a World Championships for the second time in her career, in Saitama, Japan, Spours placed twenty-seventh in the short program, only 1.27 points from qualifying for the free skate.

=== 2023–24 season ===
Spours started the season by winning bronze at the 2023 Volvo Open. She subsequently went on to win silver at the 2024 British Championships behind Nina Povey. One week later, she competed at the 2023 CS Golden Spin of Zagreb, where she finished eleventh.

She then closed the season by winning silver medals at the 2024 Bellu Memorial, the 2024 Coupe du Printemps, and 2024 Triglav Trophy.

=== 2024–25 season: First National title, European Championship debut ===
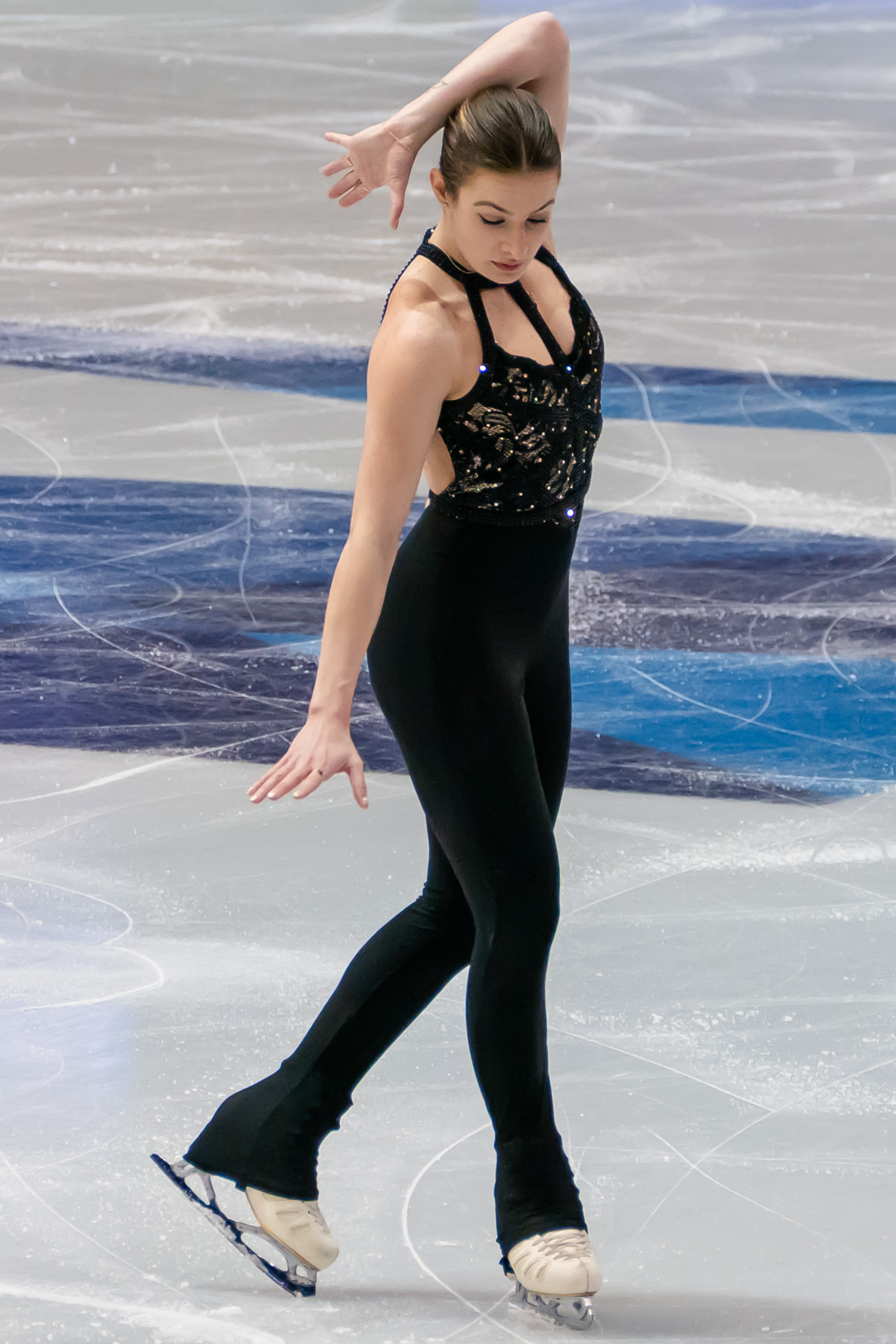
Spours performing her short program at the 2025 World Championships

Spours began the season by competing on the 2024–25 ISU Challenger Series, placing ninth at the 2024 CS Lombardia Trophy and twelfth at the 2024 CS Budapest Trophy. She then went on to take gold at the 2024 Denkova-Staviski Cup in November.

In early December, Spours won her first national title at the 2025 British Championships. She subsequently followed this up with a silver medal win at the 2025 Sofia Trophy.

Selected to compete at the 2025 European Championships for the first time, Spours placed tenth in the short program and ninth in the free skate, finishing ninth overall. This placement secured two spots for British women to compete at the 2026 European Championships, set to take place in Sheffield, England. Following the event, she said, "I honestly can’t believe that I made the top 10 at my first Europeans! It’s such a big confidence boost, and I feel really, really, really good. It means a lot to show what I’m capable of on a big stage. I’ve achieved higher scores at smaller competitions, but doing it here, at this level, feels amazing. I’m also so excited that I’ve secured an extra spot for the home Europeans in Sheffield. It’s going to be so much fun to share that experience with someone else."

In early March, Spours won the silver medal at the 2025 Maria Olszewska Memorial.

She competed at the 2025 World Championships in Boston, held in March. She placed twenty-second in the short program and advanced to the free skate for the first time in her career. In the free skate, she fell on a triple flip jump, but she remained in twenty-second place overall. Her placement earned a quota for Britain at the 2026 Winter Olympics.

In June, Spours underwent surgery to treat a disc herniation.

=== 2025–26 season: Hiatus and return to competition, Milano Cortina Olympics, retirement ===
In September, Spours announced that she would be taking an indefinite hiatus from competitive figure skating to prioritize her mental and physical health. The following month, however, Spours made the decision to return to competitive figure skating and began training for the 2025 British Championships scheduled in late November, which she ultimately won for a second consecutive time. On 10 December 2025, she was named in the Great Britain team for the 2026 Winter Olympics.

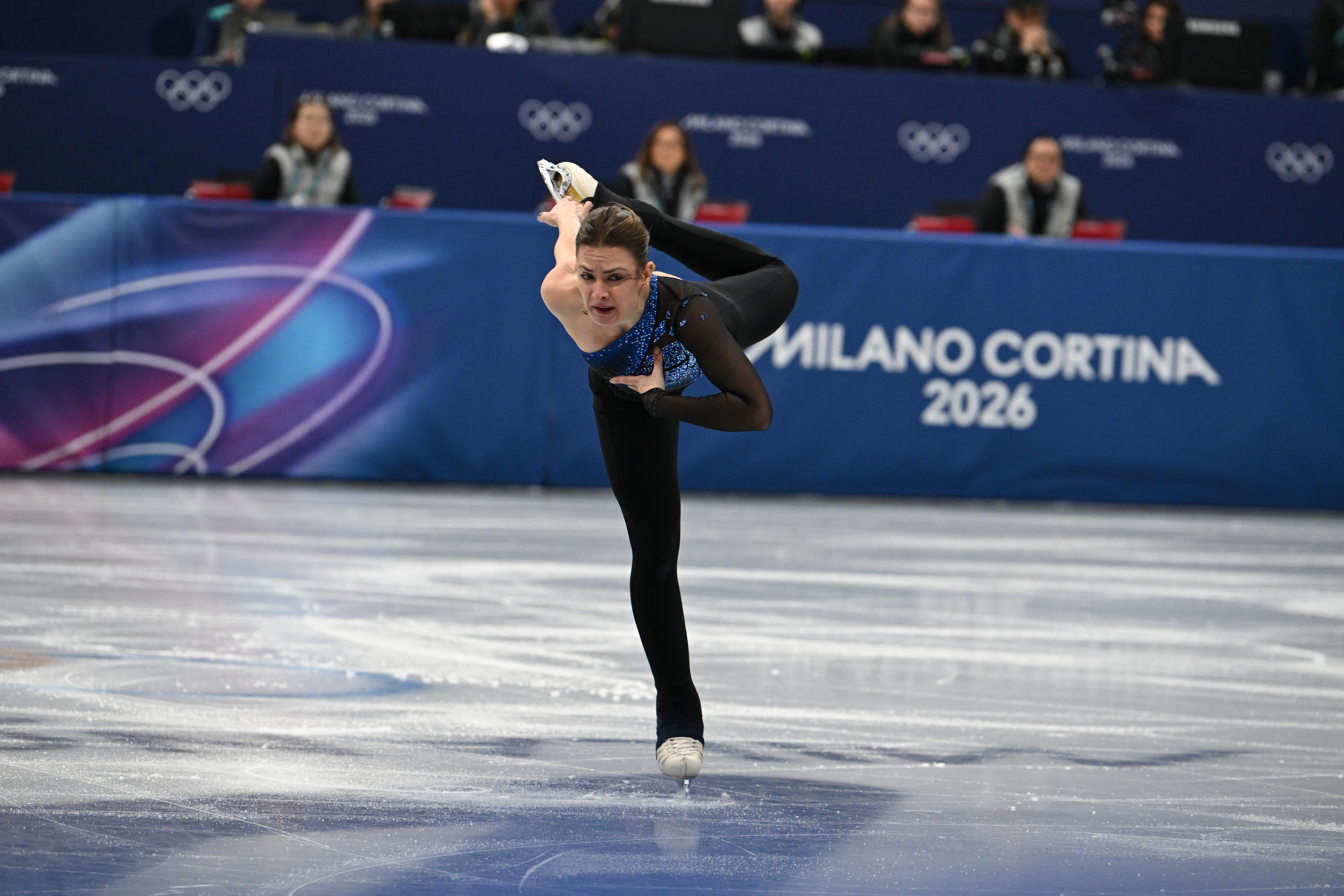
Spours during her short program at the 2026 Winter Olympics

Going into the 2026 European Championships as the home crowd favourite, Spours shared that her still-healing injury would prevent her from attempting certain jumps. Despite that, Spours managed to qualify for the free skate segment and finished the event in twenty-third place overall.

On 6 February, Spours placed tenth in the short program in the 2026 Winter Olympics Figure Skating Team Event. "I am so happy," she said. "Finally, I can call myself an Olympian, which is a super cool moment for me. It's been such a long and difficult journey. I never believed I'd make it here." Eleven days later she returned to the ice and finished twenty-ninth in the women's singles short program, failing to advance to the free skate.

At the 2026 World Championships, Spours finished twenty-sixth in the short program segment, failing to qualify for the free skate. Kristen confirmed her retirement from competitive skating during an off-ice interview following her skate.

== Programs ==
Season	Short program	Free skating
2025–2026	Iron Sky by Paolo Nutini choreo. by Lloyd Jones	Warriors by Imagine Dragons performed by 2WEI & Edda Hayes choreo. by Lloyd Jones
2024–2025	Love is a Bitch by Two Feet choreo. by Lloyd Jones	Warriors by Imagine Dragons performed by 2WEI & Edda Hayes choreo. by Lloyd Jones
2023–2024	Love is a Bitch by Two Feet choreo. by Lloyd Jones	Warriors by Imagine Dragons performed by 2WEI & Edda Hayes choreo. by Lloyd Jones
2022–2023	James Bond; No Time to Die by Billie Eilish; Cuba Chase; Shouldn't We Get to Know Each Other First by Hans Zimmer	Kill Bill; Bang Bang (My Baby Shot Me Down) by Nancy Sinatra; The Lonely Shepherd by Gheorghe Zamfir; Battle Without Honor or Humanity by Tomoyasu Hotei
2020–2022	Oblivion; Yo Soy María by Ástor Piazzolla performed by Laura Friedrich Tejero choreo. by Florent Amodio	Moulin Rouge!; The Show Must Go On by Queen performed by Nicole Kidman & Jim Broadbent; One Day I'll Fly Away by Randy Crawford performed by Nicole Kidman choreo. by Florent Amodio
2019–2020	Did not compete this season	
2018–2019	Caught Out in the Rain by Beth Hart choreo. by Florent Amodio	La La Land; Epilogue by Justin Hurwitz; Audition (The Fools Who Dream) performed by Emma Stone choreo. by Florent Amodio
2017–2018	I Put a Spell on You by Jay Screamin' Jay Hawkins performed by Jeff Beck & Joss Stone choreo. by Mark Naylor	Gypsy Overture by Jule Styne choreo. by Mark Naylor
2016–2017	Joyà (from Cirque du Soleil) choreo. by Mark Naylor	The Ouverture (from Mack and Mabel) by Jerry Herman choreo. by Mark Naylor
2015–2016	Feeling Good by Anthony Newley, Leslie Bricusse choreo. by Mark Hanretty	Spartacus by Aram Khachaturian choreo. by Mark Hanretty

== Competitive highlights ==
- JGP – Event of the ISU Junior Grand Prix Series
- CS – Event of the ISU Challenger Series
- TBD – Assigned
- WD – Withdrew from competition
- Medals at team events are awarded for the team results only. Individual placements at team events are listed in parentheses.

Competition placements at senior level
Season	2015–16	2016–17	2017–18	2018–19	2020–21	2021–22	2022–23	2023–24	2024–25	2025–26
Winter Olympics										29th
Winter Olympics (Team event)										9th (10th)
World Championships	36th						27th		22nd	26th
European Championships									9th	23rd
British Championships		5th	3rd	3rd		4th	2nd	2nd	1st	1st
CS Budapest Trophy						8th			12th	
CS Finlandia Trophy	15th									
CS Golden Spin of Zagreb								11th		
CS Ice Challenge						23rd	13th			
CS Lombardia Trophy		12th	18th			19th			9th	
CS Nebelhorn Trophy					11th					
CS Nepela Memorial							12th			
Bellu Memorial								2nd		
Challenge Cup		10th					13th			
Coupe du Printemps								2nd		
Denkova-Staviski Cup		2nd							1st	
Dragon Trophy				6th						
EduSport Trophy							1st			
Golden Bear of Zagreb			5th							
Jégvirág Cup	1st									
Maria Olszewska Memorial									2nd	
Merano Cup		3rd	4th							
Skate Helena		2nd								
Sofia Trophy			8th						2nd	
Tirnavia Ice Cup						1st				
Triglav Trophy						2nd		2nd	WD	
Trophée Métropole Nice							7th			
Volvo Open Cup				3rd				3rd		

Competition placements at junior level
Season	2012–13	2013–14	2014–15	2015–16	2016–17	2017–18	2018–19
World Junior Championships					15th	21st	20th
British Championships		6th	5th	4th	1st	1st	1st
JGP Austria						13th	
JGP Czech Republic							WD
JGP France					13th		
JGP Italy						14th	
JGP Slovakia				21st			13th
Avas Cup			1st				
Grand Prix of Bratislava					1st		
Hellmut Seibt Memorial	12th	25th					
Jégvirág Cup			2nd				
Lombardia Trophy		12th					
Mentor Toruń Cup			3rd	12th			
Merano Cup		14th					

== Detailed results ==
ISU personal best scores in the +5/-5 GOE System
Segment	Type	Score	Event
Total	TSS	168.21	2025 European Championships
Short program	TSS	57.39	2025 European Championships
Short program	TES	31.50	2025 European Championships
Short program	PCS	26.05	2025 World Championships
Free skating	TSS	110.82	2025 European Championships
Free skating	TES	56.85	2025 European Championships
Free skating	PCS	53.97	2025 European Championships

ISU personal best scores in the +3/-3 GOE System
Segment	Type	Score	Event
Total	TSS	139.34	2017 World Junior Championships
Short program	TSS	49.83	2017 World Junior Championships
Short program	TES	29.03	2017 World Junior Championships
Short program	PCS	21.69	2018 World Junior Championships
Free skating	TSS	89.51	2017 World Junior Championships
Free skating	TES	48.74	2017 World Junior Championships
Free skating	PCS	42.56	2016 CS Lombardia Trophy

=== Senior level ===
Results in the 2024–25 season
Date	Event	SP		FS		Total	
Date	Event	P	Score	P	Score	P	Score
Sep 13–15, 2024	(Italy) 2024 CS Lombardia Trophy	12	49.28	9	101.41	9	150.69
Oct 11–13, 2024	(Hungary) 2024 CS Budapest Trophy	17	38.16	7	100.77	12	138.93
Nov 5–10, 2024	(Bulgaria) 2024 Denkova-Staviski Cup	2	61.38	1	124.64	1	186.02
Nov 27 – Dec 1, 2024	(United Kingdom) 2025 British Championships	1	57.07	1	131.09	1	188.16
Jan 7–12, 2025	(Bulgaria) 2025 Sofia Trophy	4	57.47	1	118.89	2	176.36
Jan 28 – Feb 2, 2025	(Estonia) 2025 European Championships	10	57.39	9	110.82	9	168.21
Mar 4–9, 2025	(Poland) 2025 Maria Olszewska Memorial	2	58.53	2	112.32	2	170.85
Mar 25–30, 2025	(United States) 2025 World Championships	22	55.10	22	98.65	22	153.75
Apr 9-13, 2025	(Slovenia) 2025 Triglav Trophy	2	53.24	–	–	–	WD

Results in the 2025–26 season
Date	Event	SP		FS		Total	
Date	Event	P	Score	P	Score	P	Score
Nov 26–30, 2025	(United Kingdom) 2026 British Championships	1	58.77	1	104.82	1	163.59
Jan 13–18, 2026	(United Kingdom) 2026 European Championships	22	50.70	23	86.44	23	137.14
Feb 6–8, 2026	(Italy) 2026 Winter Olympics – Team event	10	48.28	—N/a	—N/a	9	—N/a
Feb 17–19, 2026	(Italy) 2026 Winter Olympics	29	45.54	—N/a	—N/a	29	45.54
Mar 24–29, 2026	(Czech Republic) 2026 World Championships	26	49.20	—N/a	—N/a	26	49.20

2023–2024 season
Date	Event	SP	FS	Total
10–14 April 2024	2024 Triglav Trophy	3; 54.92	2; 110.87	2; 165.79
15–17 March 2024	2024 Coupe du Printemps	3; 55.46	2; 107.24	2; 162.70
20–25 February 2024	2024 Bellu Memorial	2; 57.12	2; 105.38	2; 162.50
6–9 December 2023	2023 CS Golden Spin of Zagreb	7; 53.43	11; 95.04	11; 148.47
30 November–3 December 2023	2024 British Championships	2; 52.21	2; 107.82	2; 160.03
2–5 November 2023	2023 Volvo Open	5; 51.61	4; 102.43	3; 154.04
2022–2023 season
Date	Event	SP	FS	Total
22–26 March 2023	2023 World Championships	27; 53.38	–	27; 53.38
23–26 February 2023	2023 International Challenge Cup	12; 53.69	12; 102.50	13; 156.19
11–15 January 2023	2023 EduSport Trophy	1; 61.09	1; 115.60	1; 176.69
1–4 December 2022	2023 British Championships	1; 61.62	3; 106.34	2; 167.96
9–13 November 2022	2022 CS Ice Challenge	14; 49.81	13; 97.97	13; 147.78
19–22 October 2022	2022 Trophée Métropole Nice Côte d'Azur	4; 51.97	8; 94.11	7; 146.08
29 September–1 October 2022	2022 CS Nepela Memorial	11; 41.01	12; 77.60	12; 118.61
2021–2022 season
Date	Event	SP	FS	Total
13–17 April 2022	2022 Triglav Trophy	2; 58.14	2; 104.20	2; 162.34
30 November–5 December 2021	2022 British Championships	2; 59.82	5; 82.85	4; 142.67
11–14 November 2021	2021 CS Cup of Austria	24; 45.56	22; 86.25	23; 131.81
28–31 October 2021	2021 Tirnavia Ice Cup	4; 48.95	1; 109.64	1; 158.59
14–17 October 2021	2021 Budapest Trophy	9; 52.13	7; 100.23	8; 152.36
10–12 September 2021	2021 CS Lombardia Trophy	23; 46.28	19; 87.97	19; 134.25
2020–2021 season
Date	Event	SP	FS	Total
23–26 September 2020	2020 CS Nebelhorn Trophy	8; 49.90	16; 84.88	11; 134.78

=== Junior level ===
2018–19 season
Date	Event	Level	SP	FS	Total
4–10 March 2019	2019 World Junior Championships	Junior	19; 51.08	23; 85.64	20; 136.72
7–10 February 2019	2019 Dragon Trophy	Senior	7; 48.35	6; 89.71	6; 138.06
26 November–1 December 2018	2019 British Championships	Senior	3; 51.95	3; 93.82	3; 145.77
26 November–1 December 2018	2018 British Junior Championships	Junior	1; 51.55	1; 81.26	1; 132.81
6–11 November 2018	2018 Volvo Open Cup	Senior	4; 53.02	4; 98.64	3; 151.66
22–25 August 2018	2018 JGP Slovakia	Junior	11; 50.61	15; 80.48	13; 131.09
2017–18 season
Date	Event	Level	SP	FS	Total
5–11 March 2018	2018 World Junior Championships	Junior	19; 49.57	21; 79.64	21; 129.21
28 November–4 December 2017	2018 British Championships	Senior	4; 51.18	2; 97.50	3; 148.68
28 November–4 December 2017	2018 British Junior Championships	Junior	1; 52.30	1; 87.46	1; 139.76
15–19 November 2017	2017 Merano Cup	Senior	5; 46.95	5; 85.79	4; 132.74
10–14 November 2017	2017 JGP Italy	Junior	14; 46.89	15; 77.47	14; 124.36
26–29 October 2017	2017 Golden Bear of Zagreb	Senior	3; 46.15	5; 83.56	5; 129.71
14–17 September 2017	2017 CS Lombardia Trophy	Senior	25; 42.39	15; 88.24	18; 130.63
30 August–2 September 2017	2017 JGP Austria	Junior	10; 48.54	15; 76.77	13; 125.31
2016–17 season
Date	Event	Level	SP	FS	Total
15–19 March 2017	2017 World Junior Championships	Junior	16; 49.83	14; 89.51	15; 139.34
23–26 February 2017	2017 International Challenge Cup	Senior	8; 48.39	11; 79.52	10; 127.91
20–21 January 2017	2017 Skate Helena	Senior	3; 50.44	2; 90.36	2; 140.80
16–18 December 2016	2016 Grand Prix of Bratislava	Junior	1; 47.62	1; 93.57	1; 141.19
29 November–4 December 2016	2017 British Championships	Senior	5; 46.56	5; 86.65	5; 133.21
29 November–4 December 2016	2017 British Junior Championships	Junior	1; 48.36	1; 94.66	1; 143.02
10–13 November 2016	2016 Merano Cup	Senior	5; 45.15	3; 89.34	3; 134.49
18–23 October 2016	2016 Denkova-Staviski Cup	Senior	3; 45.24	2; 88.23	2; 133.47
8–11 September 2016	2016 CS Lombardia Trophy	Senior	13; 46.49	11; 88.72	12; 135.21
24–26 August 2016	2016 JGP France	Junior	16; 36.01	11; 71.38	13; 107.39
2015–16 season
Date	Event	Level	SP	FS	Total
28 March–3 April 2016	2016 World Championships	Senior	36; 42.64	–	36; 42.64
13–14 February 2016	2016 Jégvirág Cup	Senior	1; 41.61	1; 85.82	1; 127.43
6–10 January 2016	2016 Mentor Toruń Cup	Junior	12; 35.52	12; 64.81	12; 100.33
1–6 December 2015	2016 British Junior Championships	Junior	4; 37.37	3; 68.68	4; 106.05
9–11 October 2015	2015 CS Finlandia Trophy	Senior	15; 37.53	15; 79.09	15; 116.62
19–22 August 2015	2015 JGP Slovakia	Junior	27; 28.13	17; 60.93	21; 89.06
2014–15 season
Date	Event	Level	SP	FS	Total
5–8 February 2015	2015 Jégvirág Cup	Junior	2; 46.01	2; 78.21	2; 124.22
1–10 January 2015	2015 Mentor Toruń Cup	Junior	2; 43.51	3; 78.34	3; 121.85
26–30 November 2014	2015 British Junior Championships	Junior	2; 40.89	6; 59.16	5; 100.05
2013–14 season
Date	Event	Level	SP	FS	Total
26 February–1 March 2014	2014 Hellmut Seibt Memorial	Junior	25; 33.29	–	25; 33.29
26–30 November 2013	2014 British Junior Championships	Junior	5; 33.39	7; 59.83	6; 93.22
15–17 November 2013	2013 Merano Cup	Junior	13; 33.78	14; 59.19	14; 92.97
26–30 November 2013	2013 Lombardia Trophy	Junior	17; 30.13	9; 63.15	12; 93.28
