= 2017 British Figure Skating Championships =

Figure skating competition

- Type: National championship
- Date: 29 November – 4 December, 2016
- Season: 2016–17
- Location: Sheffield
- Host: NISA
- Venue: iceSheffield

Champions
- Men's singles: Graham Newberry (S, J)
- Ladies' singles: Natasha McKay (S); Kristen Spours (J)
- Pairs: Zoe Jones / Christopher Boyadji (S); Gabrielle Levesque / Ben Penhaligon (J)
- Ice dance: Lilah Fear / Lewis Gibson (S); Sasha Fear / Elliot Verburg (J)
- Previous: 2016 British Championships
- Next: 2018 British Championships

The 2017 British Figure Skating Championships were held from 29 November–4 December, 2016 in Sheffield. Medals were awarded in the disciplines of men's singles, ladies' singles, pair skating, and ice dance at the senior, junior, and novice levels. The results were among the criteria used to determine international assignments.

== Medallists ==
=== Senior ===
Discipline	Gold	Silver	Bronze
Men	Graham Newberry	Peter James Hallam	Phillip Harris
Ladies	Natasha McKay	Karly Robertson	Danielle Harrison
Pairs	Zoe Jones / Christopher Boyadji	No other competitors	
Ice dance	Lilah Fear / Lewis Gibson	Robynne Tweedale / Joseph Buckland	Ekaterina Fedyushchenko / Lucas Kitteridge

=== Junior ===
Discipline	Gold	Silver	Bronze
Men	Graham Newberry	Ruaridh Fisher	Josh Brown
Ladies	Kristen Spours	Anastasia Vaipan-Law	Anna Litvinenko
Pairs	Gabrielle Levesque / Ben Penhaligon	No other competitors	
Ice dance	Sasha Fear / Elliot Verburg	Emily Rose Brown / James Hernandez	Jessica Marjot / Aleksandr Jemeljanov

== Senior results ==
=== Men ===
Rank	Name	Club	Total points	SP		FS	
1	Graham Newberry	LVL	194.58	2	66.01	1	128.57
2	Peter James Hallam	SHE	193.18	1	70.94	4	122.24
3	Phillip Harris	COV	186.35	3	61.79	3	124.56
4	Harry Mattick	COV	178.91	4	54.21	2	124.70
5	Charlie Parry Evans	NIC	151.63	5	53.16	5	98.47

=== Ladies ===
Rank	Name	Club	Total points	SP		FS	
1	Natasha McKay	DDE	150.95	1	53.11	1	97.84
2	Karly Robertson	DDE	147.97	3	50.92	3	97.05
3	Danielle Harrison	DDE	146.36	2	52.25	4	94.11
4	Nina Povey	SOL	146.28	4	49.22	2	97.06
5	Kristen Spours	LVL	133.21	5	46.56	5	86.65
6	Anna Litvinenko	GUI	118.88	6	43.95	7	74.93
7	Lana Bagen	MUR	114.10	8	38.76	6	75.34
8	Katie Powell	DDE	108.55	7	42.88	10	65.67
9	Michelle Callison	DDE	103.78	9	36.02	9	67.76
10	Rowenna Mackessack-Leitch	MOR	98.45	11	30.22	8	68.23
11	Bethany Powell	DEE	92.04	10	34.47	11	57.57
12	Bryony Corrigan-Rattray	BRD	70.38	12	26.96	12	43.42

=== Pairs ===
Rank	Name	Club	Total points	SP		FS	
1	Zoe Jones / Christopher Boyadji	SWI	151.48	1	52.53	1	99.15

=== Ice dance ===
Rank	Name	Club	Total points	SD		FD	
1	Lilah Fear / Lewis Gibson	AXP	163.04	1	65.86	1	97.18
2	Robynne Tweedale / Joseph Buckland	NIC	151.78	2	58.48	2	93.30
3	Ekaterina Fedyushchenko / Lucas Kitteridge	NIS	131.82	3	48.06	3	83.76
4	Chantelle A'Court / Paul Crocker	BRA	74.64	4	32.76	4	41.88

== International team selections ==
=== World Championships ===
The 2017 World Figure Skating Championships were held in Helsinki, Finland from 27 March–2 April 2017.

	Men	Ladies	Pairs	Ice dance
1	Graham Newberry	Natasha McKay	Zoe Jones / Christopher Boyadji	Lilah Fear / Lewis Gibson
2				~~Robynne Tweedale / Joseph Buckland~~
1st alt.	Phillip Harris	Karly Robertson		

=== European Championships ===
The 2017 European Figure Skating Championships were held in Ostrava, Czech Republic from 25 to 29 January 2017.

	Men	Ladies	Pairs	Ice dance
1	Graham Newberry	Natasha McKay	Zoe Jones / Christopher Boyadji	Lilah Fear / Lewis Gibson
2				Robynne Tweedale / Joseph Buckland

=== World Junior Championships ===
The 2017 World Junior Figure Skating Championships were held in Taipei City, Taiwan from 15 to 19 March 2017.

	Men	Ladies	Ice dance
1	Graham Newberry	Kristen Spours	Sasha Fear / Elliott Verburg
