= 2019 British Figure Skating Championships =

Figure skating competition

- Type: National championship
- Date: 26 November – 1 December 2018
- Season: 2018–19
- Location: Sheffield
- Host: NISA
- Venue: iceSheffield

Champions
- Men's singles: Graham Newberry
- Ladies' singles: Natasha McKay
- Pairs: Zoe Jones / Christopher Boyadji
- Ice dance: Lilah Fear / Lewis Gibson
- Previous: 2018 British Championships
- Next: 2020 British Championships

The 2019 British Figure Skating Championships were held in Sheffield from 26 November to 1 December 2018. BBC Sport covered events on Friday 30 November and Saturday 1 December. Medals were awarded in the disciplines of men's singles, ladies' singles, pair skating, and ice dancing on the senior, junior, and novice levels. The results were among the criteria used to determine international assignments.

== Senior results ==
=== Men ===
Graham Newberry won his second national title.

Rank	Name	Club	Total points	SP		FS	
1	Graham Newberry	Romford	200.55	1	77.14	1	123.41
2	Peter James Hallam	Sheffield	182.00	2	67.89	2	114.11
3	Harry Mattick	Oxford	155.94	3	56.07	3	99.87

=== Ladies ===
Defending ladies' champion Natasha McKay won her third title.

Rank	Name	Club	Total points	SP		FS	
1	Natasha McKay	Dundee	151.87	2	53.75	1	98.12
2	Karly Robertson	Dundee	150.99	1	55.19	2	95.80
3	Kristen Spours	Romford	145.77	3	51.95	3	93.82
4	Katie Powell	Dundee	140.87	5	47.78	4	93.09
5	Nina Povey	Sheffield	131.01	4	48.24	5	82.77
6	Bethany Powell	Deeside	124.67	6	45.19	7	79.48
7	Anna Litvinenko	Guildford	124.05	7	42.12	6	81.93
8	Lowri Jones	Coventry	109.71	8	38.19	9	71.52
9	Morgan Swales	Sheffield	109.17	10	35.23	8	73.94
10	Lydia Smart	Coventry	107.05	9	37.94	10	69.11

=== Pairs ===
Rank	Name	Club	Total points	SP		FS	
1	Zoe Jones / Christopher Boyadji	Swindon	142.68	1	48.39	1	94.29

=== Ice dance ===
Lilah Fear / Lewis Gibson were second after a fall in the rhythm dance but overtook Robynne Tweedale / Joseph Buckland in the next segment.

Rank	Name	Club	Total points	RD		FD	
1	Lilah Fear / Lewis Gibson	Alexandra Palace	181.89	2	61.82	1	120.07
2	Robynne Tweedale / Joseph Buckland	National Ice Centre	168.04	1	63.32	2	104.72
3	Eleanor Hirst / Anthony Currie	Romford	112.47	3	44.52	3	67.95

== International team selections ==
=== European Championships ===
Following the conclusion of the British Championships, the team for the 2019 European Championships was published.

	Men	Ladies	Pairs	Ice dancing
	Graham Newberry	Natasha McKay	Zoe Jones / Christopher Boyadji	Lilah Fear / Lewis Gibson
				Robynne Tweedale / Joseph Buckland
1st alt.	Peter James Hallam	Karly Robertson		
