= 2018 British Figure Skating Championships =

Figure skating competition

- Type: National championship
- Date: 28 November – 4 December 2017
- Season: 2017–18
- Location: Sheffield
- Host: NISA
- Venue: IceSheffield

Champions
- Men's singles: Phillip Harris
- Ladies' singles: Natasha McKay
- Pairs: Zoe Jones / Christopher Boyadji
- Ice dance: Penny Coomes / Nicholas Buckland
- Previous: 2017 British Championships
- Next: 2019 British Championships

The 2018 British Figure Skating Championships were held from 28 November to 4 December 2017 in Sheffield. Medals were awarded in the disciplines of men's singles, ladies' singles, pair skating, and ice dance at the senior, junior, and novice levels. The results were part of the selection criteria for the 2018 Winter Olympics, 2018 World Championships, 2018 European Championships, and the 2018 World Junior Championships.

== Senior results ==
=== Men ===
Rank	Name	Club	Total points	SP		FS	
1	Phillip Harris	COV	210.37	1	70.56	1	139.81
2	Peter James Hallam	ISH	189.18	2	65.32	2	123.86
3	Graham Newberry	LVL	175.03	3	64.23	3	110.80
4	Harry Mattick	COV	168.38	4	58.54	4	109.84

=== Ladies ===
Rank	Name	Club	Total points	SP		FS	
1	Natasha McKay	DDE	152.16	2	54.39	1	97.77
2	Karly Robertson	DDE	150.26	1	55.75	3	94.51
3	Kristen Spours	GUI	148.68	4	51.18	2	97.50
4	Danielle Harrison	DDE	139.25	3	52.61	5	86.64
5	Nina Povey	ISH	139.15	5	48.55	4	90.60
6	Katie Powell	DDE	118.04	6	42.57	6	75.47

=== Pairs ===
Rank	Name	Club	Total points	SP		FS	
1	Zoe Jones / Christopher Boyadji	SWI/C	143.61	1	53.18	1	90.43

=== Ice dance ===
Rank	Name	Club	Total points	SD		FD	
1	Penny Coomes / Nicholas Buckland	NIC	185.05	1	75.15	1	109.90
2	Lilah Fear / Lewis Gibson	AXP	167.26	2	60.39	2	106.87
3	Robynne Tweedale / Joseph Buckland	NIC	152.88	3	56.48	3	96.40
4	Olivia Dufour / Luke Russell	NIS	116.60	4	42.04	4	74.56
5	Jessica Marjot / Aleksandr Jemeljanov	STR	99.58	5	39.15	5	60.43

== International team selections ==
=== Winter Olympics ===
The figure skating event at the 2018 Winter Olympics was held on 9–23 February 2018 at the Gangneung Ice Arena in Gangneung, South Korea. Coomes / Buckland were the only British skaters to qualify Olympic spots.

Ice dance
Penny Coomes / Nicholas Buckland

=== World Championships ===
The 2018 World Figure Skating Championships were held on 19–25 March 2018 in Milan, Italy. Coomes / Buckland were forced to withdraw due to injury.

	Men	Ladies	Pairs	Ice dance
	Phillip Harris	Natasha McKay	Zoe Jones / Christopher Boyadji	~~Penny Coomes / Nicholas Buckland~~ (withdrew)
1st alt.	Graham Newberry	Karly Robertson		Lilah Fear / Lewis Gibson (called up)

=== European Championships ===
The 2018 European Figure Skating Championships were held from 15–21 January 2018 in Moscow, Russia.

	Men	Ladies	Pairs	Ice dance
	Phillip Harris	Natasha McKay	Zoe Jones / Christopher Boyadji	Penny Coomes / Nicholas Buckland
1st alt.	Graham Newberry	Karly Robertson		Lilah Fear / Lewis Gibson
