= Karly Robertson =

Scottish figure skater (born 1989)

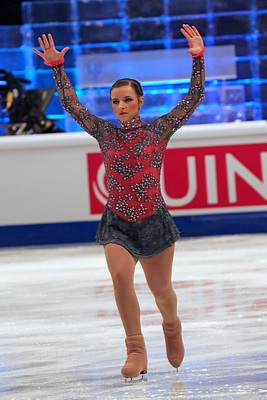

Personal information
- Born: 14 November 1989 (age 36) Dundee, Scotland
- Height: 1.58 m (5 ft 2 in)

Figure skating career
- Country: United Kingdom
- Coach: Simon Briggs; Debi Briggs
- Skating club: Dundee ISC
- Began skating: 2001
- Retired: 2022
Medal record
British Championships
Gold medal – first place	2015 Sheffield	Singles
Silver medal – second place	2008 Sheffield	Singles
Silver medal – second place	2009 Nottingham	Singles
Silver medal – second place	2010 Sheffield	Singles
Silver medal – second place	2011 Sheffield	Singles
Silver medal – second place	2012 Sheffield	Singles
Silver medal – second place	2013 Sheffield	Singles
Silver medal – second place	2014 Sheffield	Singles
Silver medal – second place	2017 Sheffield	Singles
Silver medal – second place	2018 Sheffield	Singles
Silver medal – second place	2019 Sheffield	Singles
Silver medal – second place	2020 Sheffield	Singles
Silver medal – second place	2022 Sheffield	Singles

Karly Robertson (born 14 November 1989) is a Scottish retired figure skater who represented Great Britain in competition. She is the 2018 Volvo Open Cup silver medalist, the 2019 Tayside Trophy silver medalist, the 2017 Skate Helena bronze medalist, the 2015 British national champion, and an 12-time British national silver medalist (2008-2014, 2017–2020, 2022).

On the junior level, she is the 2006 British junior national champion.

Robertson was coached by Simon and Debi Briggs in Dundee, Scotland.

She began skating after an ice rink opened in Dundee. Her sister is fellow figure skater Kristie Robertson.

== Programs ==
Season	Short program	Free skating
2021–2022	My Immortal by Evanescence	In the End by Linkin Park performed by Tommee Profitt & Fleurie
2019–2020	Yours by Ella Henderson, Josh Record	Angel by Sarah McLachlan
2018–2019	With You (from Ghost: The Musical)	Angel by Sarah McLachlan
2017–2018	With You (from Ghost: The Musical)	Stone Cold by Demi Lovato
2016–2017	With You (from Ghost: The Musical)	One Day I'll Fly Away (from Moulin Rouge!)
2014–2015	Classical Soul by Oscar Lopez	The Phantom of the Opera by Andrew Lloyd Webber
2009–2010	Schindler's List by John Williams	Nessun dorma (from Turandot) by Giacomo Puccini; Palladio by Karl Jenkins
2008–2009	Schindler's List by John Williams	Leeloos Tune by Maksim Mrvica

== Competitive highlights ==
CS: Challenger Series

International
Event	05–06	06–07	07–08	08–09	09–10	10–11	11–12	12–13	13–14	14–15	15–16	16–17	17–18	18–19	19–20	21–22
Europeans				21st	23rd					26th						
CS Alpen Trophy														7th		
CS Finlandia Trophy												13th	12th	11th		25th
CS Golden Spin										12th						
CS Nebelhorn Trophy												9th				
CS Ondrej Nepela													13th		12th	
CS Volvo Cup										7th						
CS Warsaw Cup																WD
Bavarian Open								26th		11th	10th					
Cup of Nice					18th	16th	11th			11th	8th					9th
Golden Bear											4th					
Halloween Cup															5th	
Hellmut Seibt										12th						
Ice Challenge								13th								
Int. Challenge Cup														6th		
Ondrej Nepela							14th	16th	10th							
Reykjavík Int. Games												1st				
Skate Helena												3rd				
Sportland Trophy											9th					
Tayside Trophy															2nd	6th
Toruń Cup											11th					
Volvo Open Cup									7th		6th		4th	2nd	6th	
International: Junior
Junior Worlds				23rd												
National
British Champ.	4th J	1st J	2nd	2nd	2nd	2nd	2nd	2nd	2nd	1st	4th	2nd	2nd	2nd	2nd	2nd
J = Junior level
