= Joseph Buckland =

English ice dancer

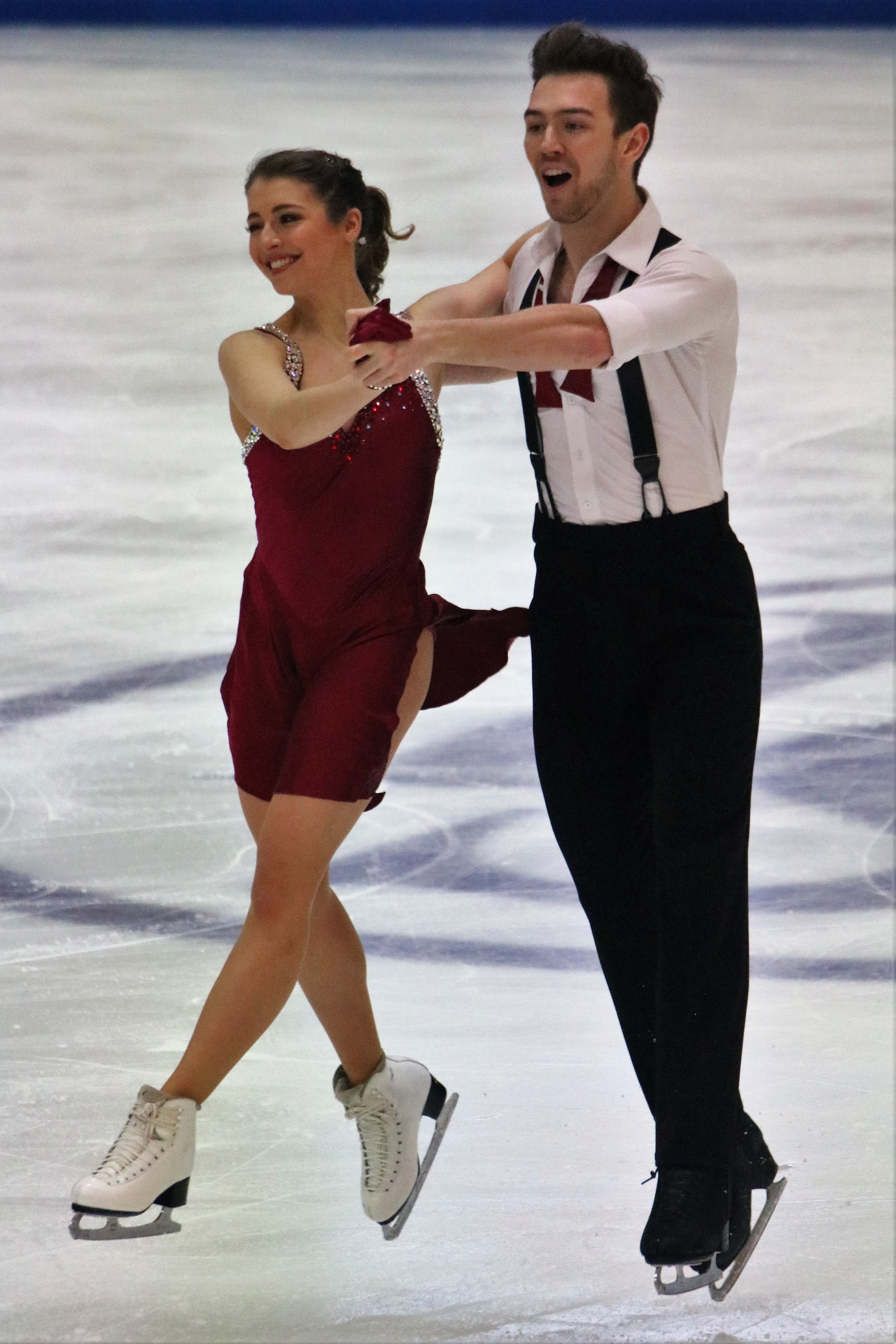
- Robynne Tweedale and Josep Buckland at the 2020 European Championships

Personal information
- Born: 27 October 1992 (age 33) Nottingham, England, United Kingdom
- Height: 1.77 m (5 ft 9 1/2 in)

Figure skating career
- Country: Great Britain
- Discipline: Ice dance
- Partner: Robynne Tweedale (2016–20); Olivia Smart (2011–15); Danielle Bennett (2009–10)
- Began skating: 1995

Medal record
British Championships
Gold medal – first place	2015 Sheffield	Ice dance
Silver medal – second place	2017 Sheffield	Ice dance
Silver medal – second place	2019 Sheffield	Ice dance
Bronze medal – third place	2018 Sheffield	Ice dance

Joseph Buckland (born 27 October 1992) is an English ice dancer. With former partner Olivia Smart, he is a three-time British national junior champion (2012–14) and competed at three World Junior Championships, reaching the top ten in 2014.

== Personal life ==
Joseph Buckland was born in Nottingham, England. He is the younger brother of Nicholas Buckland, who also competes in ice dancing.

== Career ==
=== Early years ===
Buckland teamed up with his first partner, Georgia Robinson, at age 15. In 2008, he was diagnosed with two stress fractures in his spine, keeping him off the ice for six months. He skated with Danielle Bennett in the 2009–10 season. The two placed 15th at their sole ISU Junior Grand Prix event, in Turkey, and became the British national silver medalists on the junior level.

=== Ice dance with Olivia Smart ===
Buckland began skating with Olivia Smart in 2010. They made their JGP debut in autumn 2011, ranking 13th in Austria and 12th in Estonia. They came in 17th at their first World Junior Championships, held in Minsk in March 2012. In the 2012–13 season, the duo missed the JGP series and finished 22nd at the 2013 World Junior Championships in Milan.

In 2013–14, Smart/Buckland placed seventh at both of their JGP assignments, Poland and the Czech Republic, and finished 10th at the 2014 World Junior Championships in Sofia, Bulgaria.

Smart/Buckland moved up to the senior level in the 2014–15 season. In October 2014, they placed fourth at the Ondrej Nepela Trophy, an ISU Challenger Series event. In November, they won silver medals at the International Cup of Nice and NRW Trophy before taking the British national title in the absence of Penny Coomes / Nicholas Buckland. Smart/Buckland withdrew from the 2015 European Championships before the short dance, Buckland having fallen ill with gastroenteritis. The duo then went on to place 27th at the 2015 World Championships in Shanghai, China. They split in June 2015.

=== Later partnerships ===
Buckland teamed up with Molly Lanaghan in October 2015. As of October 2016, his skating partner is Robynne Tweedale.

== Programs ==
=== With Tweedale ===
Season	Rhythm dance	Free dance
2019–20	Quickstep: The Lady Is a Tramp performed by Matthew Morrison; Foxtrot: Let's Face the Music and Dance (from Follow the Fleet) by Irving Berlin	Rocket Man; Goodbye Yellow Brick Road (from Rocketman) by Elton John
	Short dance	
2018–19	Tango: Whatever Lola Wants; Tango: Libertango by Astor Piazzolla	Ghost the Musical by Dave Stewart, Glen Ballard
2017–18	Samba: El Beso del Final by Christina Aguilera; Rhumba: Loca by Shakira	Ghost the Musical by Dave Stewart, Glen Ballard
2016–17	Blues: Heartbreak Hotel; Swing: Blue Suede Shoes by Elvis Presley	My Immortal by Evanescence

=== Ice dance with Olivia Smart ===
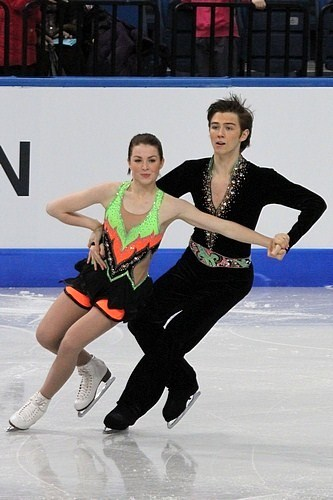
Smart / Buckland at the 2012 World Junior Championships

Season	Short dance	Free dance
2014–15	Paso doble: Diablo Rojo by Rodrigo y Gabriela; Flamenco: Crepuscolo Sul Mare by Piero Umiliani	Sunset Boulevard by Andrew Lloyd Webber
2013–14	Puttin' On the Ritz by Irving Berlin; Bang Bang	Paso Doble; El Mariachi; Once Upon A Time In Mexico by Robert Rodriguez
2012–13	Swing Set by Jurassic 5; Feeling Good by Escala	Tango In Ebony by Maksim, Julian Kershaw; Butterflies and Hurricanes by William Joseph
2011–12	Natural Passion by Latin Festival; Sway	That Man by Caro Emerald; Ain't No Sunshine by Lighthouse Family; Pencil Full of Lead by Paolo Nutini

== Competitive highlights ==
- GP – Event of the ISU Grand Prix Series
- JGP – Event of the ISU Junior Grand Prix Series
- CS – Event of the ISU Challenger Series

=== With Tweedale ===
International
Event	16–17	17–18	18–19	19–20
Europeans	21st		17th	21st
GP Skate America			9th	
GP Skate Canada			7th	
CS Golden Spin		12th	6th	9th
CS Lombardia			5th	10th
CS Ondrej Nepela			6th	
CS Tallinn Trophy	15th			
CS Warsaw Cup		7th		
Bavarian Open	8th	5th		4th
Cup of Nice		7th		
Egna Trophy		6th		
Mezzaluna Cup				6th
Toruń Cup	6th			4th
National
British Champ.	2nd	3rd	2nd	

=== Ice dance with Olivia Smart ===
Competition placements at senior level
Season	2014–15
World Championships	27th
Spanish Championships	1st
CS Ondrej Nepela Trophy	4th
Cup of Nice	2nd
NRW Trophy	2nd

Competition placements at junior level
Season	2011–12	2012–13	2013–14
World Junior Championships	17th	22nd	10th
British Championships	1st	1st	1st
JGP Austria	13th		
JGP Czech Republic			7th
JGP Estonia	12th		
JGP Poland			7th
Bavarian Open		6th	3rd
Mentor Cup	1st		
NRW Trophy			3rd
Santa Claus Cup		8th	

=== With Bennett ===
International
Event	2009–10
JGP Turkey	15th
NRW Trophy	12th J
National
British Championships	2nd J
