= Mentor Toruń Cup =

International figure skating competition

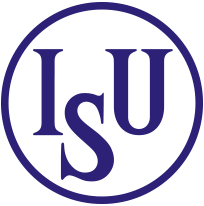
- Location: Poland

The World Mentor Toruń Cup (previously known as the Kangus Cup in 2006, the Nestlé Kangus Cup in 2008, the GAM Nestlé Nesquik Cup from 2009 to 2010, the Mentor Nestlé Nesquik Toruń Cup from 2011 to 2016, and the Mentor Cup from 2017 to 2019) is an annual international figure skating competition which is generally held in January in Toruń, Poland. Medals may be awarded in men's singles, women's singles, pair skating, and ice dance at the senior, junior, and novice levels.

== Senior results ==
=== Men's singles ===
Year	Gold	Silver	Bronze	Ref.
2015	(France) Romain Ponsart	(France) Chafik Besseghier	(Germany) Peter Liebers	
2016	(Israel) Alexei Bychenko	(Armenia) Slavik Hayrapetyan	(Azerbaijan) Larry Loupolover	
2017	(Italy) Matteo Rizzo	(Germany) Peter Liebers	(Germany) Paul Fentz	
2018	(Italy) Daniel Grassl	(United Kingdom) Peter James Hallam	(Italy) Jari Kessler	
2019	(Australia) Brendan Kerry	(Italy) Gabriele Frangipani	(United Kingdom) Graham Newberry	
2020	(Azerbaijan) Vladimir Litvintsev	(Russia) Mark Kondratyuk	(Australia) Brendan Kerry	
2021	Cancelled due to the COVID-19 pandemic			
2022	Cancelled due to the COVID-19 pandemic			

=== Women's singles ===
Year	Gold	Silver	Bronze	Ref.
2014	(Poland) Agata Kryger	(Israel) Danielle Montalbano	(Spain) Marta García	
2015	(Latvia) Angelīna Kučvaļska	(Australia) Kailani Craine	(Slovenia) Daša Grm	
2016	(Latvia) Angelīna Kučvaļska	(Armenia) Anastasiya Galustyan	(Chinese Taipei) Amy Lin	
2017	(France) Laurine Lecavelier	(France) Maé-Bérénice Méité	(Armenia) Anastasiya Galustyan	
2018	(Netherlands) Niki Wories	(Czech Republic) Eliška Březinová	(United Kingdom) Nina Povey	
2019	(Italy) Marina Piredda	(Brazil) Isadora Williams	(Finland) Linnea Ceder	
2020	(Poland) Ekaterina Kurakova	(United States) Emily Zhang	(Israel) Alina Iushchenkova	
2021	Cancelled due to the COVID-19 pandemic			
2022	Cancelled due to the COVID-19 pandemic			

=== Pairs ===
Year	Gold	Silver	Bronze	Ref.
2011	(United States); Mary Beth Marley; Rockne Brubaker	(Bulgaria); Alexandra Malakhova; Leri Kenchadze	No other competitors	
2012	(Russia); Tatiana Novik; Andrei Novoselov	(Israel); Danielle Montalbano; Evgeni Krasnopolski	(Czech Republic); Alexandra Herbríková; Rudy Halmaert	
2013	(Bulgaria); Elizaveta Makarova; Leri Kenchadze	(Belarus); Maria Paliakova; Nikita Bochkov	(Poland); Marcelina Lech; Jakub Tyc	
2014	(Italy); Giulia Foresti; Luca Dematte	(Spain); Veronica Grigorieva; Aritz Maestu	No other competitors	
2015	(Italy); Nicole Della Monica; Matteo Guarise	(Belarus); Tatiana Danilova; Mikalai Kamianchuk	(Germany); Minerva Fabienne Hase; Nolan Seegert	
2016	(Japan); Sumire Suto; Francis Boudreau-Audet	(Lithuania); Goda Butkutė; Nikita Ermolaev	(France); Lola Esbrat; Andrei Novoselov	
2017	(Japan); Sumire Suto; Francis Boudreau-Audet	(South Korea); Kim Su-yeon; Kim Hyung-tae	(Lithuania); Goda Butkutė; Nikita Ermolaev	
2018	(Spain); Laura Barquero; Aritz Maestu	(Italy); Rebecca Ghilardi; Filippo Ambrosini	(Spain); Dorota Broda; Pedro Betegon	
2021	Cancelled due to the COVID-19 pandemic			
2022	Cancelled due to the COVID-19 pandemic			

=== Ice dance ===
Year	Gold	Silver	Bronze	Ref.
2012	(United Kingdom); Penny Coomes; Nicholas Buckland	(Ukraine); Siobhan Heekin-Canedy; Dmitri Dun	(Austria); Kira Geil; Tobias Eisenbauer	
2013	(Ukraine); Siobhan Heekin-Canedy; Dmitri Dun	(Japan); Cathy Reed; Chris Reed	(Australia); Danielle O'Brien; Gregory Merriman	
2014	(Russia); Ekaterina Pushkash; Jonathan Guerreiro	(Spain); Sara Hurtado; Adrià Díaz	(Denmark); Laurence Fournier Beaudry; Nikolaj Sørensen	
2015	(China); Wang Shiyue; Liu Xinyu	(Turkey); Alisa Agafonova; Alper Uçar	(Poland); Natalia Kaliszek; Maksym Spodyriev	
2016	(Poland); Natalia Kaliszek; Maksym Spodyriev	(Japan); Kana Muramoto; Chris Reed	(Germany); Katharina Müller; Tim Dieck	
2017	(Poland); Natalia Kaliszek; Maksym Spodyriev	(Spain); Sara Hurtado; Kirill Khalyavin	(Japan); Kana Muramoto; Chris Reed	
2018	(Poland); Natalia Kaliszek; Maksym Spodyriev	(United Kingdom); Lilah Fear; Lewis Gibson	(Hungary); Anna Yanovskaya; Ádám Lukács	
2019	(United States); Madison Chock; Evan Bates	(Poland); Natalia Kaliszek; Maksym Spodyriev	(China); Wang Shiyue; Liu Xinyu	
2020	(Poland); Natalia Kaliszek; Maksym Spodyriev	(China); Wang Shiyue; Liu Xinyu	(Armenia); Tina Garabedian; Simon Proulx-Sénécal	
2021	Cancelled due to the COVID-19 pandemic			
2022	Cancelled due to the COVID-19 pandemic			

== Junior results ==
=== Men's singles ===
Year	Gold	Silver	Bronze	Ref.
2006	(Poland) Michał Kaliszek	(Russia) Pavel Detkov	(Belarus) Mikhail Karaliuk	
2007	(Belarus) Dmitri Kagirov	(Belarus) Mikhail Karaliuk	(Poland) Michał Kaliszek	
2008	(Poland) Sebastian Iwasaki	(Poland) Michał Kaliszek	(Poland) Piotr Snopek	
2009	(Belarus) Mikhail Karaliuk	(Poland) Sebastian Lofek	No other competitors	
2010	(Ukraine) Stanislav Pertsov	(Finland) Julian Lagus	(United Kingdom) Harry Mattick	
2011	(Kazakhstan) Denis Ten	(Armenia) Sarkis Hayrapetyan	(Armenia) Slavik Hayrapetyan	
2012	(Germany) Alexander Schopke	(Germany) Vincent Hey	(Germany) Christopher Huttl	
2013	(Chinese Taipei) Tsao Chih-I	(United Kingdom) Jamie Whiteman	(Poland) Krzysztof Gała	
2014	(Israel) Daniel Samohin	(Spain) Víctor Bustamante	(Belarus) Anton Karpuk	
2015	(Poland) Krzysztof Gała	(Azerbaijan) Larry Loupolover	(Sweden) Illya Solomin	
2016	(Italy) Daniel Grassl	(Russia) Ilya Mironov	(Chinese Taipei) Micah Tang	
2017	(Italy) Daniel Grassl	(Russia) Ilya Mironov	(France) Julian Donica	
2018	(Italy) Gabriele Frangipani	(United Kingdom) Luke Digby	(Germany) Daniel Sapoznikov	
2019	(Ukraine) Andrii Kokura	(Turkey) Alp Eren Özkan	(France) Landry Le May	
2020	(United Kingdom) Edward Appleby	(Sweden) Casper Johansson	(Russia) Grigory Fedorov	
2021	Cancelled due to the COVID-19 pandemic			
2022	Cancelled due to the COVID-19 pandemic			

=== Women's singles ===
Year	Gold	Silver	Bronze	Ref.
2006	(Russia) Ekaterina Larionova	(Poland) Urszula Reszka	(Lithuania) Beatričė Rožinskaitė	
2007	(Lithuania) Beatričė Rožinskaitė	(Poland) Paulina Zembrzuska	(Belarus) Yuna Drabysheuskaya	
2008	(Poland) Sandra Matz	(Russia) Maria Vaganova	(Poland) Urszula Reszka	
2009	(Lithuania) Rimgailė Meškaitė	(Poland) Olga Szelc	(Poland) Deana Adela Vicari	
2010	(Finland) Cecilia Törn	(Lithuania) Inga Janulevičiūtė	(Belarus) Ksenia Bakusheva	
2011	(Italy) Jennifer Cucinella	(Italy) Victoria Manni	(Armenia) Marta Grigoryan	
2012	(Austria) Victoria Hübler	(Poland) Agata Kryger	(Germany) Anne Zetsche	
2013	(Russia) Nikol Gosviani	(Poland) Agata Kryger	(Israel) Netta Schreiber	
2014	(Israel) Netta Schreiber	(Belarus) Daria Batura	(Sweden) Matilda Algotsson	
2015	(Kazakhstan) Elizabet Tursynbaeva	(Sweden) Matilda Algotsson	(United Kingdom) Kristen Spours	
2016	(Russia) Ekaterina Kurakova	(Latvia) Diāna Ņikitina	(Sweden) Anastasia Schneider	
2017	(Russia) Ekaterina Kurakova	(France) Alizée Crozet	(France) Elodie Eudine	
2018	(Ukraine) Anastasiia Arkhypova	(France) Léa Serna	(Latvia) Polina Andrejeva	
2019	(France) Julie Froetscher	(Finland) Selma Valitalo	(Chinese Taipei) Mandy Chiang	
2020	(Bulgaria) Maria Levushkina	(Russia) Sofia Baranova	(Lithuania) Jogailė Aglinskytė	
2021	Cancelled due to the COVID-19 pandemic			
2022	Cancelled due to the COVID-19 pandemic			

=== Pairs ===
Year	Gold	Silver	Bronze	Ref.
2008	(Russia); Ekaterina Sheremetieva; Mikhail Kuznetsov	(Russia); Irina Moiseeva; Vladimir Morozov	No other competitors	
2009	(Russia); Irina Moiseeva; Vladimir Morozov	(Russia); Anastasia Ortikova; Stepan Dubrovskiy	(Poland); Natalia Kaliszek; Michał Kaliszek	
2010	(Germany); Karolin Salatzki; Nolan Seegert	(Poland); Natalia Kaliszek; Michał Kaliszek	(Poland); Magdalena Jaskółka; Piotr Snopek	
2011	(Sweden); Michele Lundberg; Richard Lundberg	(Poland); Magdalena Jaskółka; Piotr Snopek	No other competitors	
2012	(Russia); Valeria Grechukhina; Andrei Filonov	(Russia); Maria Deryabina; Vladimir Arkhipov	(Poland); Aleksandra Malinkiewicz; Sebastian Lofek	
2013	(Russia); Kamilla Gainetdinova; Ivan Bich	(Italy); Giulia Foresti; Leo Luca Sforza	(Ukraine); Elizaveta Usmantseva; Sergei Kulbach	
2014	(Latvia); Ekaterina Pribylova; Jegors Admiralovs	No other competitors		
2015	(United States); Caitlin Fields; Ernie Utah Stevens	(Italy); Irma Caldara; Edoardo Caputo	No other competitors	
2016	(Kazakhstan); Ekaterina Khokhlova; Abish Baitkanov	(United Kingdom); Harriet Beatson; Jack Newberry	(Australia); Jessica Rotondo; Ryan Dodds	
2017	(Japan); Riku Miura; Shoya Ichihashi	(Spain); Dorota Broda; Pedro Betegón	No other competitors	
2018	(Spain); Isabella Gamez; Tòn Cónsul	(United States); Nadine Wang; Spencer Howe	(Ukraine); Sofiia Nesterova; Artem Darenskyi	
2021	Cancelled due to the COVID-19 pandemic			
2022	Cancelled due to the COVID-19 pandemic			

=== Ice dance ===
Year	Gold	Silver	Bronze	Ref.
2012	(United Kingdom); Olivia Smart; Joseph Buckland	(Israel); Ekaterina Bugrov; Vasili Rogov	(Ukraine); Irina Sayko; Konstantin Yakovlev	
2013	(Ukraine); Lolita Yermak; Oleksiy Khimich	(Ukraine); Anastasia Chiriyatyeva; Serhiy Shevchenko	(Israel); Anna Bolshem; Ronald Zilberberg	
2014	(Ukraine); Valeria Haistruk; Oleksiy Oliynyk	(Poland); Natalia Kaliszek; Yaroslav Kurbakov	(Russia); Anastasia Khromova; Yury Karesey	
2015	(United States); Lorraine McNamara; Quinn Carpenter	(United States); Rachel Parsons; Michael Parsons	(Russia); Eva Khachaturian; Andrei Bagin	
2016	(France); Adelina Galyavieva; Laurent Abecassis	(Belarus); Maria Oleynik; Yuri Hulitski	(Japan); Rikako Fukase; Aru Tateno	
2017	(Russia); Elizaveta Khudaiberdieva; Nikita Nazarov	(Belarus); Emiliya Kalehanova; Uladzislau Palkhouski	(Ukraine); Mariia Holubtsova; Kyryl Bielobrov	
2018	(Georgia (country)); Maria Kazakova; Georgy Reviya	(Ukraine); Mariia Holubtsova; Kyryl Bielobrov	(France); Julia Wagret; Mathieu Couyras	
2019	(United States); Caroline Green; Gordon Green	(France); Loïcia Demougeot; Théo le Mercier	(Russia); Sonia Kamyshanova; Dmitry Bovin	
2020	(Russia); Arina Ushakova; Maxim Nekrasov	(Russia); Ekaterina Katashinskaia; Aleksandr Vaskovich	(France); Loïcia Demougeot; Théo le Mercier	
2021	Cancelled due to the COVID-19 pandemic			
2022	Cancelled due to the COVID-19 pandemic			
