= Christian Newberry =

British figure skater

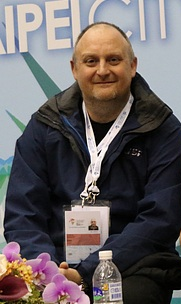

Personal information
- Born: 1968 (age 57–58)

Figure skating career
- Country: United Kingdom

Christian Newberry (born in 1968) is a British former competitive figure skater. He is the 1989 British national champion. Newberry placed 15th at the 1989 European Championships in Birmingham, England and 21st at the 1989 World Championships in Paris, France. He trained at the Lee Valley Ice Centre in London, England and Colorado Springs, Colorado.

After retiring from competition, Newberry moved to the United States and began coaching in Pennsylvania. In June 2014, he returned to London to coach at the Lee Valley Ice Centre. His two sons, Jack (born in 1995) and Graham (born in 1998), have both competed in figure skating for the United Kingdom. In 2023, Newberry moved back to the United States with his son Graham to coach at Pelham Civic Complex in Alabama.

== Competitive highlights ==
International
Event	1988–89	1989–90
World Championships	21st	
European Championships	15th	
National
British Championships	1st	2nd
