= Graham Newberry =

British figure skater

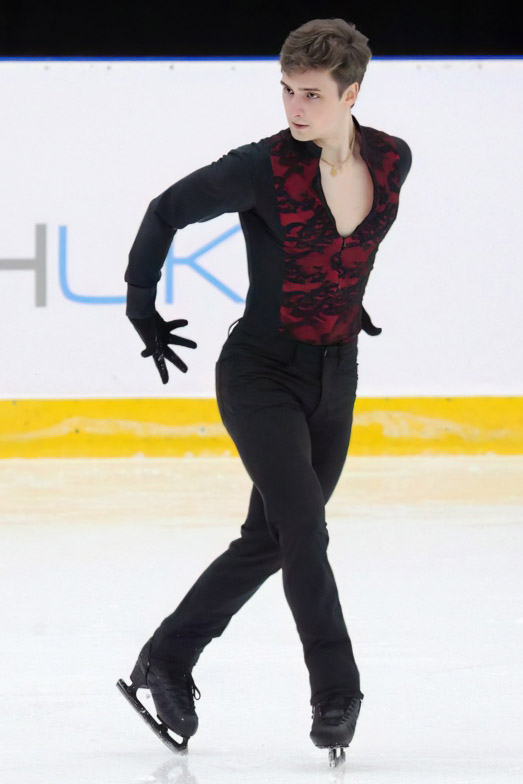
- Newberry at the 2022 MK John Wilson Trophy

Personal information
- Born: 7 June 1998 (age 28) Hershey, Pennsylvania, United States
- Home town: London, England, United Kingdom
- Height: 1.70 m (5 ft 7 in)

Figure skating career
- Country: Great Britain
- Discipline: Men's singles
- Began skating: 1999
- Retired: March 10, 2024

Medal record
British Championships
| Gold medal – first place | 2017 Sheffield | Singles |
| Gold medal – first place | 2019 Sheffield | Singles |
| Gold medal – first place | 2022 Sheffield | Singles |
| Gold medal – first place | 2023 Sheffield | Singles |
| Silver medal – second place | 2020 Sheffield | Singles |
| Bronze medal – third place | 2018 Sheffield | Singles |

Graham Newberry (born June 7, 1998) is a retired British figure skater. He won eight senior international medals, including gold at the 2017 Merano Cup, and is a four-time British national champion. He reached the final segment at seven ISU Championships.

== Personal life ==
Graham Newberry was born June 7, 1998, in Hershey, Pennsylvania. He has dual British and American citizenship. He is the son of Christian Newberry, the 1989 British senior champion, and brother of Jack Newberry, the 2012 British junior bronze medalist.

== Career ==
Newberry competed on the novice level in the 2011–12 season and moved up to the junior level the following season. At the 2013 European Youth Olympic Festival, he placed third in both segments but came in fourth overall.

In the 2013–14 season, Newberry received his first ISU Junior Grand Prix (JGP) assignments; he placed tenth in Mexico City and fifth in Ostrava. After winning the British junior title, he was sent to the 2014 World Junior Championships, where he qualified for the free skate. Ranked 21st in the short and 17th in the free, he finished 19th overall. Coached by his father, he trained at Twin Ponds in Harrisburg, Pennsylvania until the end of the season.

In mid-2014, Newberry began training in London, England, where he continued to be coached by his father. In his second JGP season, he placed seventh in Ostrava and sixth in Zagreb. Making his senior international debut, he finished eighth at the Volvo Open Cup, an ISU Challenger Series in November 2014. In February 2015, he won the senior silver medal at the Jégvirág Cup in Hungary. At the 2015 World Junior Championships, he placed 21st overall.

In December 2016, Newberry won the British senior title. He also won his third junior national title.

On March 10, 2024, Newberry announced his retirement from competitive skating.

== Programs ==
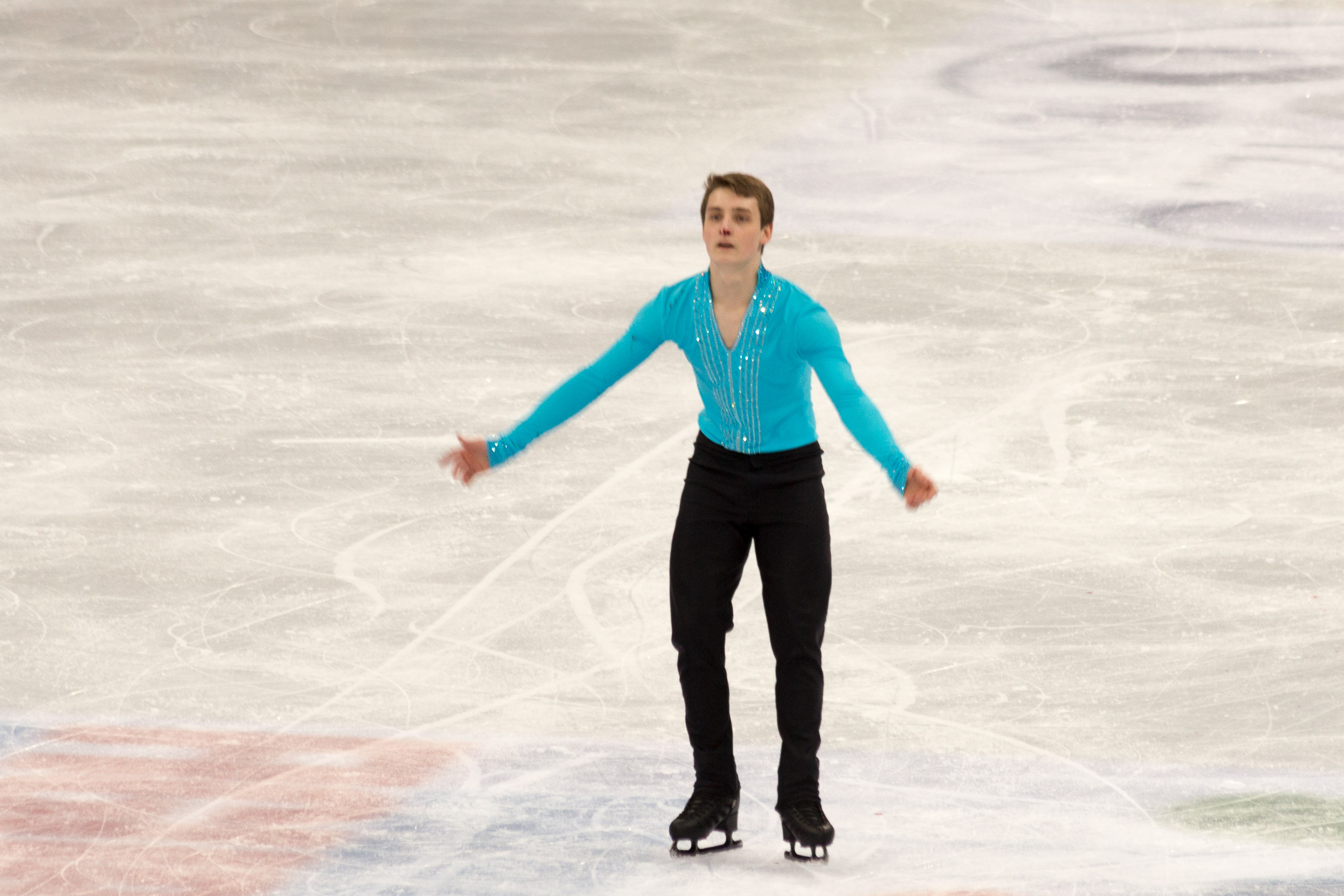
Newberry takes a bow after his short program at the 2017 World Figure Skating Championships

| Season | Short program | Free skating | Exhibition |
|---|---|---|---|
| 2022–2023 | No Good by Kaleo choreo. by Graham Newberry, Christian Newberry | Malagueña by Ernesto Lecuona performed by Roni Benise choreo. by Graham Newberry, Christian Newberry | Bad to the Bone by George Thorogood and the Destroyers |
| 2021–2022 | Tortured by Les Friction choreo. by Graham Newberry, Christian Newberry | Malagueña by Ernesto Lecuona performed by Roni Benise choreo. by Graham Newberry, Christian Newberry | |
| 2020–2021 | Tortured by Les Friction choreo. by Graham Newberry, Christian Newberry | Take You Down; Che Vuole Questa Musica Stasera; Breaking Out choreo. by Graham Newberry, Christian Newberry | |
| 2019–2020 | La Vendetta; John Wick Mode; Run Boy Run by Woodkid choreo. by Graham Newberry, Christian Newberry | Take You Down; Che Vuole Questa Musica Stasera; Breaking Out choreo. by Graham Newberry, Christian Newberry | |
| 2018–2019 | Louder Than Words | Gladiator by Hans Zimmer | |
| 2017–2018 | The Sound of Silence by Disturbed | Gladiator by Hans Zimmer | |
| 2016–2017 | The Man from U.N.C.L.E. | The Last Samurai by Hans Zimmer | |
| 2015–2016 | Unstoppable by E.S. Posthumus | The Last Samurai by Hans Zimmer | |
| 2014–2015 | Unstoppable by E.S. Posthumus | Night on Bald Mountain by Modest Mussorgsky | |
| 2013–2014 | Breakfast Machine by Danny Elfman | The Artist by Ludovic Bource | |

== Competitive highlights ==
- GP – Event of the ISU Grand Prix Series
- JGP – Event of the ISU Junior Grand Prix Series
- CS – Event of the ISU Challenger Series
- C – Event was cancelled
- WD – Withdrew from competition

Competition placements at senior level
| Season | 2014–15 | 2015–16 | 2016–17 | 2017–18 | 2018–19 | 2019–20 | 2020–21 | 2021–22 | 2022–23 |
|---|---|---|---|---|---|---|---|---|---|
| World Championships | | | 31st | | | | | 20th | 32nd |
| European Championships | | | 16th | | 21st | | | 26th | 23rd |
| British Championships | | | 1st | 3rd | 1st | 2nd | C | 1st | 1st |
| GP Wilson Trophy | | | | | | | | | 11th |
| CS Budapest Trophy | | | | | | | | 5th | 11th |
| CS Finlandia Trophy | | WD | | | 20th | | | | |
| CS Lombardia Trophy | | | 7th | 15th | | | | 14th | |
| CS Nebelhorn Trophy | | | | 10th | | | 14th | | |
| CS Nepela Memorial | | | | | 10th | 6th | | | 11th |
| CS Volvo Open Cup | 8th | | | | | | | | |
| Bellu Memorial | | | | | | | | 7th | |
| Britannia Cup | | | | | | | | | 1st |
| Challenge Cup | | | 4th | | 10th | | | | |
| Denkova-Staviski Cup | | | 2nd | | | 2nd | | | |
| Dragon Trophy | | | | | 7th | | | | |
| Golden Bear of Zagreb | | | | 2nd | | | | | |
| Halloween Cup | | | | 2nd | | 7th | | | |
| Jégvirág Cup | 2nd | | | | | | | | |
| Mentor Toruń Cup | 7th | | 4th | | 3rd | 5th | | | |
| Merano Cup | | | 3rd | 1st | | | | | |
| Tayside Trophy | | | | | | 2nd | | 5th | |
| Volvo Open Cup | | | | | 4th | 9th | | | |

Competition placements at junior level
| Season | 2012–13 | 2013–14 | 2014–15 | 2015–16 | 2016–17 |
|---|---|---|---|---|---|
| World Junior Championships | | 19th | 21st | | 15th |
| British Championships | 5th | 1st | 1st | | 1st |
| JGP Croatia | | | 6th | | |
| JGP Czech Republic | | 5th | 7th | | |
| JGP Estonia | | | | | 8th |
| JGP France | | | | | 12th |
| JGP Mexico | | 10th | | | |
| JGP Poland | | | | 15th | |
| JGP Slovakia | | | | 13th | |
| European Youth Olympic Festival | 4th | | | | |
| New Year's Cup | 3rd | | | | |
| Volvo Open Cup | | 2nd | | | |

== Detailed results ==
ISU personal best scores in the +5/-5 GOE System
| Segment | Type | Score | Event |
|---|---|---|---|
| Total | TSS | 210.40 | 2022 World Championships |
| Short program | TSS | 74.92 | 2022 World Championships |
| Short program | TES | 38.85 | 2022 World Championships |
| Short program | PCS | 36.07 | 2022 World Championships |
| Free skating | TSS | 135.48 | 2022 World Championships |
| Free skating | TES | 64.26 | 2022 World Championships |
| Free skating | PCS | 72.50 | 2019 CS Nepela Memorial |

ISU personal best scores in the +3/-3 GOE System
| Segment | Type | Score | Event |
|---|---|---|---|
| Total | TSS | 198.06 | 2017 European Championships |
| Short program | TSS | 70.80 | 2017 World Junior Championships |
| Short program | TES | 38.78 | 2017 JGP Estonia |
| Short program | PCS | 32.03 | 2017 World Junior Championships |
| Free skating | TSS | 130.27 | 2017 European Championships |
| Free skating | TES | 67.99 | 2017 European Championships |
| Free skating | PCS | 65.80 | 2017 World Junior Championships |

=== Senior level ===
Results in the 2014–15 season
| Date | Event | SP | | FS | | Total | |
| Date | Event | P | Score | P | Score | P | Score |
|---|---|---|---|---|---|---|---|
| Nov 5–9, 2014 | (Latvia) 2014 CS Volvo Open Cup | 5 | 59.87 | 11 | 93.58 | 8 | 153.45 |
| Jan 7–10, 2015 | (Poland) 2015 Mentor Toruń Cup | 7 | 54.50 | 6 | 109.53 | 7 | 164.03 |
| Feb 5–8, 2015 | (Hungary) 2015 Jégvirág Cup | 1 | 54.31 | 2 | 108.20 | 2 | 162.51 |

Results in the 2015–16 season
| Date | Event | SP | | FS | | Total | |
| Date | Event | P | Score | P | Score | P | Score |
|---|---|---|---|---|---|---|---|
| Oct 8–11, 2015 | (Finland) 2015 CS Finlandia Trophy | 16 | 42.26 | – | – | – | WD |

Results in the 2016–17 season
| Date | Event | SP | | FS | | Total | |
| Date | Event | P | Score | P | Score | P | Score |
|---|---|---|---|---|---|---|---|
| Sep 8–11, 2016 | (Italy) 2016 CS Lombardia Trophy | 8 | 54.34 | 7 | 112.57 | 7 | 166.91 |
| Oct 18–23, 2016 | (Bulgaria) 2016 Denkova-Staviski Cup | 2 | 59.63 | 2 | 126.53 | 2 | 186.16 |
| Nov 10–13, 2016 | (Italy) 2016 Merano Cup | 2 | 64.45 | 3 | 124.17 | 3 | 188.62 |
| Nov 29 – Dec 4, 2016 | (United Kingdom) 2017 British Championships | 2 | 66.01 | 1 | 128.57 | 1 | 194.58 |
| Jan 10–15, 2017 | (Poland) 2017 Mentor Toruń Cup | 5 | 65.63 | 5 | 120.59 | 4 | 186.22 |
| Jan 25–29, 2017 | (Czech Republic) 2017 European Championships | 16 | 67.79 | 16 | 130.27 | 16 | 198.06 |
| Feb 23–26, 2017 | (Netherlands) 2017 International Challenge Cup | 5 | 60.65 | 3 | 130.41 | 4 | 191.06 |
| Mar 29 – Apr 2, 2017 | (Finland) 2017 World Championships | 31 | 62.04 | – | – | 31 | 62.04 |

Results in the 2017–18 season
| Date | Event | SP | | FS | | Total | |
| Date | Event | P | Score | P | Score | P | Score |
|---|---|---|---|---|---|---|---|
| Sep 14–17, 2017 | (Italy) 2017 CS Lombardia Trophy | 10 | 65.98 | 15 | 113.02 | 15 | 179.00 |
| Sep 27–30, 2017 | (Germany) 2020 CS Nebelhorn Trophy | 10 | 64.83 | 10 | 123.88 | 10 | 188.71 |
| Oct 26–29, 2017 | (Croatia) 2017 Golden Bear of Zagreb | 2 | 64.01 | 2 | 120.84 | 2 | 184.85 |
| Nov 15–19, 2017 | (Italy) 2017 Merano Cup | 1 | 73.15 | 1 | 128.32 | 1 | 201.47 |
| Nov 28 – Dec 4, 2017 | (United Kingdom) 2018 British Championships | 3 | 64.23 | 3 | 110.80 | 3 | 175.03 |

Results in the 2018–19 season
| Date | Event | SP | | FS | | Total | |
| Date | Event | P | Score | P | Score | P | Score |
|---|---|---|---|---|---|---|---|
| Sep 19–22, 2018 | (Slovakia) 2018 CS Ondrej Nepela Trophy | 10 | 58.32 | 11 | 110.87 | 10 | 169.19 |
| Oct 4–7, 2018 | (Finland) 2018 CS Finlandia Trophy | 19 | 52.99 | 19 | 97.07 | 20 | 150.06 |
| Oct 19–21, 2018 | (Hungary) 2018 Halloween Cup | 3 | 55.47 | 2 | 122.77 | 2 | 178.24 |
| Nov 6–11, 2018 | (Latvia) 2018 Volvo Open Cup | 5 | 62.26 | 4 | 130.75 | 4 | 193.01 |
| Nov 26 – Dec 1, 2018 | (United Kingdom) 2019 British Championships | 1 | 77.14 | 1 | 123.41 | 1 | 200.55 |
| Jan 8–13, 2019 | (Poland) 2019 Mentor Toruń Cup | 4 | 63.34 | 4 | 123.36 | 3 | 186.70 |
| Jan 21–27, 2019 | (Belarus) 2019 European Championships | 22 | 61.33 | 17 | 127.29 | 21 | 188.62 |
| Feb 7–10, 2019 | (Slovenia) 2019 Dragon Trophy | 6 | 61.14 | 8 | 109.69 | 7 | 170.83 |
| Feb 21–24, 2019 | (Netherlands) 2019 International Challenge Cup | 9 | 61.54 | 10 | 114.68 | 10 | 176.22 |

Results in the 2019–20 season
| Date | Event | SP | | FS | | Total | |
| Date | Event | P | Score | P | Score | P | Score |
|---|---|---|---|---|---|---|---|
| Aug 12–13, 2019 | (United Kingdom) 2019 Tayside Trophy | 2 | 67.67 | 2 | 128.29 | 2 | 195.96 |
| Sep 19–21, 2019 | (Slovakia) 2019 CS Nepela Memorial | 6 | 63.22 | 6 | 134.82 | 6 | 198.04 |
| Oct 17–20, 2019 | (Hungary) 2019 Halloween Cup | 5 | 61.16 | 9 | 98.42 | 7 | 159.58 |
| Nov 5–10, 2019 | (Latvia) 2019 Volvo Open Cup | 6 | 66.70 | 9 | 125.99 | 9 | 192.69 |
| Nov 12–17, 2019 | (Bulgaria) 2019 Denkova-Staviski Cup | 1 | 74.82 | 2 | 134.00 | 2 | 208.82 |
| Nov 26 – Dec 1, 2019 | (United Kingdom) 2020 British Championships | 2 | 71.31 | 2 | 115.88 | 2 | 187.19 |
| Jan 7–12, 2020 | (Poland) 2020 Mentor Toruń Cup | 3 | 62.34 | 5 | 124.91 | 5 | 187.25 |

Results in the 2020–21 season
| Date | Event | SP | | FS | | Total | |
| Date | Event | P | Score | P | Score | P | Score |
|---|---|---|---|---|---|---|---|
| Sep 23–26, 2020 | (Germany) 2020 CS Nebelhorn Trophy | 13 | 62.84 | 14 | 109.77 | 14 | 172.61 |

Results in the 2021–22 season
| Date | Event | SP | | FS | | Total | |
| Date | Event | P | Score | P | Score | P | Score |
|---|---|---|---|---|---|---|---|
| Sep 10–12, 2021 | (Italy) 2021 CS Lombardia Trophy | 16 | 60.60 | 12 | 121.26 | 14 | 182.33 |
| Oct 14–17, 2021 | (Hungary) 2021 CS Budapest Trophy | 4 | 70.14 | 5 | 132.20 | 5 | 202.34 |
| Nov 6–7, 2021 | (United Kingdom) 2021 Tayside Trophy | 3 | 70.26 | 6 | 116.80 | 5 | 187.06 |
| Nov 30 – Dec 5, 2021 | (United Kingdom) 2021 British Championships | 2 | 72.70 | 1 | 139.82 | 1 | 212.52 |
| Jan 10–16, 2022 | (Estonia) 2022 European Championships | 26 | 64.49 | – | – | 26 | 64.49 |
| Feb 26–27, 2022 | (Romania) 2022 Bellu Memorial | 8 | 66.55 | 6 | 126.97 | 7 | 193.52 |
| Mar 21–27, 2022 | (France) 2022 World Championships | 21 | 74.92 | 21 | 135.48 | 20 | 210.40 |

Results in the 2022–23 season
| Date | Event | SP | | FS | | Total | |
| Date | Event | P | Score | P | Score | P | Score |
|---|---|---|---|---|---|---|---|
| Aug 26–28, 2022 | (United Kingdom) 2022 Britannia Cup International | 1 | 74.19 | 1 | 136.88 | 1 | 211.07 |
| Sep 29 – Oct 1, 2022 | (Slovakia) 2022 CS Nepela Memorial | 12 | 54.26 | 9 | 120.30 | 11 | 174.56 |
| Oct 13–16, 2022 | (Hungary) 2022 CS Budapest Trophy | 11 | 61.83 | 10 | 121.16 | 11 | 182.99 |
| Nov 11–13, 2022 | (United Kingdom) 2022 MK John Wilson Trophy | 9 | 64.30 | 12 | 116.12 | 11 | 180.42 |
| Dec 1–4, 2022 | (United Kingdom) 2022 British Championships | 1 | 74.22 | 1 | 141.10 | 1 | 215.32 |
| Jan 25–29, 2023 | (Finland) 2023 European Championships | 15 | 70.85 | 24 | 103.79 | 23 | 174.64 |
| Mar 22–26, 2023 | (Japan) 2023 World Championships | 32 | 61.70 | – | – | 32 | 61.70 |

=== Junior level ===
Results in the 2012–13 season
| Date | Event | SP | | FS | | Total | |
| Date | Event | P | Score | P | Score | P | Score |
|---|---|---|---|---|---|---|---|
| Jan 3–6, 2013 | (Slovakia) 2013 New Year's Cup | 2 | 46.07 | 3 | 97.59 | 3 | 143.66 |
| Feb 17–22, 2013 | (Romania) 2013 European Youth Olympic Festival | 3 | 48.90 | 3 | 101.64 | 4 | 150.54 |
| Nov 26 – Dec 2, 2012 | (United Kingdom) 2012 British Championships (Junior) | 6 | 41.53 | 4 | 82.44 | 5 | 123.97 |

Results in the 2013–14 season
| Date | Event | SP | | FS | | Total | |
| Date | Event | P | Score | P | Score | P | Score |
|---|---|---|---|---|---|---|---|
| Sep 4–7, 2013 | 2013 JGP Mexico | 10 | 49.48 | 9 | 105.80 | 10 | 155.28 |
| Oct 2–5, 2013 | 2013 JGP Czech Republic | 7 | 54.85 | 5 | 110.44 | 5 | 165.29 |
| Nov 7–10, 2013 | (Latvia) 2013 Volvo Open Cup | 5 | 44.88 | 2 | 107.05 | 2 | 151.93 |
| Nov 26–30, 2013 | (United Kingdom) 2013 British Championships (Junior) | 1 | 49.14 | 1 | 104.56 | 1 | 153.70 |
| Mar 10–16, 2014 | (Bulgaria) 2014 World Junior Championships | 21 | 55.17 | 17 | 107.20 | 19 | 162.37 |

Results in the 2014–15 season
| Date | Event | SP | | FS | | Total | |
| Date | Event | P | Score | P | Score | P | Score |
|---|---|---|---|---|---|---|---|
| Sep 3–6, 2014 | 2014 JGP Czech Republic | 8 | 52.11 | 8 | 104.97 | 7 | 157.08 |
| Oct 8–11, 2014 | 2014 JGP Croatia | 6 | 59.24 | 6 | 115.47 | 6 | 174.71 |
| Nov 26–30, 2014 | (United Kingdom) 2014 British Championships (Junior) | 1 | 58.45 | 1 | 106.17 | 1 | 164.62 |
| Mar 2–8, 2015 | (Estonia) 2015 World Junior Championships | 23 | 54.56 | 20 | 100.38 | 21 | 154.94 |

Results in the 2015–16 season
| Date | Event | SP | | FS | | Total | |
| Date | Event | P | Score | P | Score | P | Score |
|---|---|---|---|---|---|---|---|
| Aug 19–22, 2015 | 2015 JGP Slovakia | 9 | 54.14 | 17 | 75.15 | 13 | 129.29 |
| Sep 23–26, 2015 | 2015 JGP Poland | 15 | 48.90 | 15 | 94.23 | 15 | 143.13 |

Results in the 2016–17 season
| Date | Event | SP | | FS | | Total | |
| Date | Event | P | Score | P | Score | P | Score |
|---|---|---|---|---|---|---|---|
| Aug 24–27, 2016 | 2016 JGP France | 12 | 54.11 | 13 | 100.07 | 12 | 154.18 |
| Sep 28 – Oct 1, 2016 | 2017 JGP Estonia | 5 | 68.85 | 8 | 111.48 | 8 | 180.33 |
| Nov 29 – Dec 4, 2016 | (United Kingdom) 2016 British Championships (Junior) | 1 | 68.14 | 1 | 108.82 | 1 | 176.96 |
| Mar 15–19, 2017 | (Chinese Taipei) 2017 World Junior Championships | 11 | 70.80 | 14 | 120.98 | 15 | 191.78 |
