= Phillip Harris =

British former figure skater (born 1989)

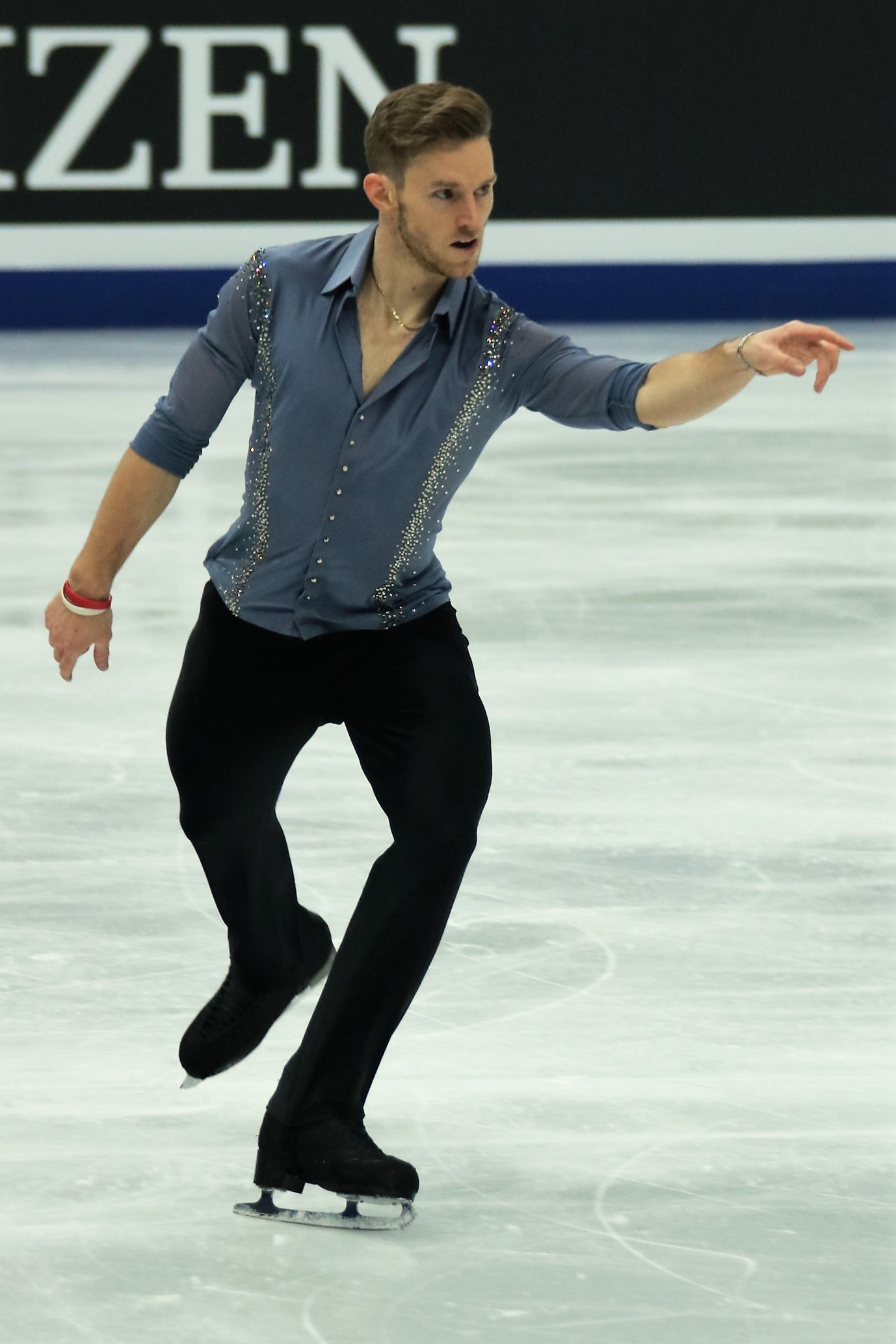
- Harris at the 2018 European Championships

Personal information
- Born: 29 September 1989 (age 36) Blackpool, England
- Height: 1.71 m (5 ft 7 1/2 in)

Figure skating career
- Country: United Kingdom
- Coach: Yuri Bureiko, Marina Serova
- Skating club: ISS Coventry
- Began skating: 2000
- Retired: 17 March 2019

Phillip Harris (born 29 September 1989) is a British former figure skater. He is a three-time British national champion (2014–2015, 2015–2016, 2017–2018) and has qualified for the free skate at four ISU Championships.

== Career ==
=== Early career ===
Harris began skating in Blackpool at the age of eleven, in 2000. After winning the British junior title in January 2008, he relocated to Coventry and began to be coached by Yuri Bureiko.

Harris never competed on the ISU Junior Grand Prix series. He made his senior international debut at the 2009 NRW Trophy, placing 19th. In the 2010–2011 season, he stepped onto the British national podium for the first time, taking the bronze medal. He repeated as the bronze medalist in the 2011–2012 season, finished fourth in 2012–2013, and withdrew in the 2013–2014 Olympic season. He landed the triple Axel jump for the first time in 2013. In 2014, he began working as a coach to cover his expenses.

=== 2014–2015 season ===
Harris competed at three ISU Challenger Series (CS) events, placing 8th at the Lombardia Trophy, fifth at the Ice Challenge, and ninth at the Golden Spin of Zagreb. In late November 2014, he won his first senior national title. Harris was assigned to his first ISU Championship, the European Championships held in January 2015 in Stockholm, Sweden. Ranked 12th in the short program, he earned qualification to the final segment and finished 15th overall.

=== 2015–2016 season ===
Harris began his season on the Challenger Series, placing 10th at the 2015 CS Nebelhorn Trophy and 6th at the 2015 CS Ice Challenge, before finishing 4th at the NRW Trophy. In December, he won his second national title. He reached the final segment at two ISU Championships – the 2016 European Championships in Bratislava, where he finished 18th, and the 2016 World Championships in Boston, where he ranked 22nd.

=== 2016–2017 season ===
Harris finished third at the British Championships, behind Graham Newberry and Peter James Hallam. As a result, he was not assigned to any ISU Championships.

=== 2017–2018 season ===
Harris won his third national title in December 2017. In January, he placed 13th at the 2018 European Championships in Moscow.

=== 2018–2019 season ===
Harris got his first Grand Prix event, the Grand Prix of Helsinki, where he placed 10th. This was the only competition he competed at this season.

He announced his retirement on 17 March 2019.

== Programs ==
| Season | Short program | Free skating |
|---|---|---|
| 2018–2019 | Bloodstream By Tokio Myers | Fix You By Coldplay |
| 2017–2018 | Dig Down by Muse | Blues for Klook by Eddy Louiss |
| 2016–2017 | Le Désir by Saint-Preux | Blues for Klook by Eddy Louiss |
| 2015–2016 | Le Désir by Saint-Preux | The Globalist by Muse |
| 2013–2015 | All Is Hell That Ends Well by Two Steps From Hell | Medley by Two Steps From Hell |
| 2012–2013 | The Blues; Tribute to the Eagles | Private Investigation by Dire Straits |

== Competitive highlights ==
CS: Challenger Series

International
| Event | 07–08 | 08–09 | 09–10 | 10–11 | 11–12 | 12–13 | 13–14 | 14–15 | 15–16 | 16–17 | 17–18 | 18–19 |
|---|---|---|---|---|---|---|---|---|---|---|---|---|
| Worlds | | | | | | | | | 22nd | | 24th | |
| Europeans | | | | | | | | 15th | 18th | | 13th | |
| GP Finland | | | | | | | | | | | | 10th |
| CS Finlandia | | | | | | | | | | | | WD |
| CS Golden Spin | | | | | | | | 9th | | | | |
| CS Ice Challenge | | | | | | | | 5th | 6th | | | |
| CS Lombardia | | | | | | | | 8th | | | | |
| CS Nebelhorn | | | | | | | | | 10th | | | |
| CS Nepela Memorial | | | | | | | | | | 8th | | |
| CS Warsaw Cup | | | | | | | | | | 8th | | |
| Challenge Cup | | | | | | 8th | 6th | 4th | | | | |
| Crystal Skate | | | | | 9th | | | | | | | |
| Cup of Nice | | | | 17th | 18th | | 10th | 8th | | | 7th | |
| Dragon Trophy | | | | | | 6th | | | | | | |
| Golden Bear | | | | | | | | | | 2nd | | |
| Merano Cup | | | | | | 6th | | | | | | |
| Mladost Trophy | | | | | | 1st | | | | | | |
| Nebelhorn Trophy | | | | | | 18th | | | | | | |
| NRW Trophy | | | 19th | 13th | | | | | 4th | | | |
| Seibt Memorial | | | | | | | 12th | 4th | | | | |
| Triglav Trophy | | | | | | | 4th | | | | | |
| Volvo Open | | | | | | | | | | | 3rd | |
National
| British Champ. | 1st J | 6th | 6th | 3rd | 3rd | 4th | WD | 1st | 1st | 3rd | 1st | |
J = Junior level; TBD = Assigned; WD = Withdrew
