= Natasha McKay =

Scottish figure skater (born 1995)

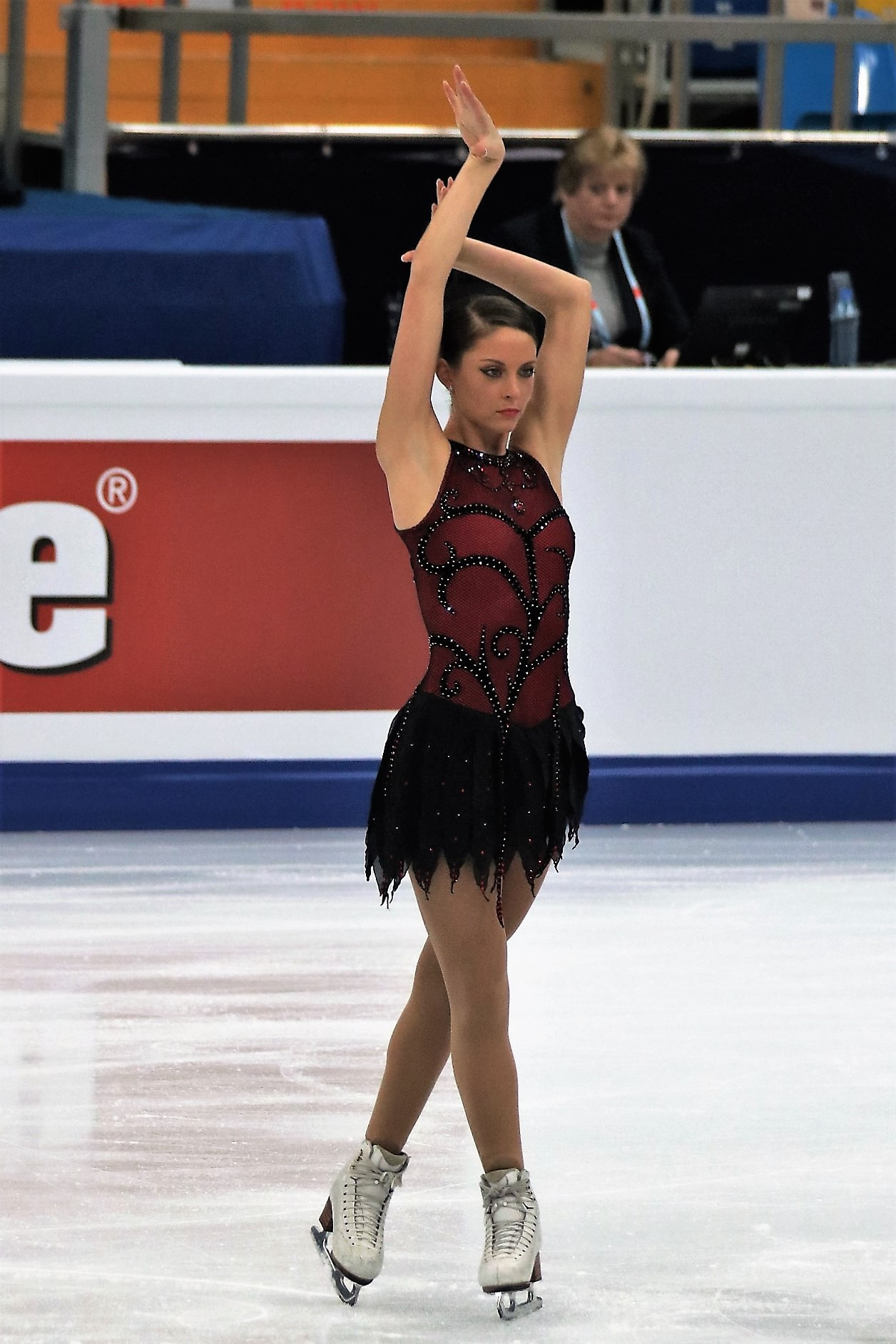
- McKay in 2018

Personal information
- Born: 14 January 1995 (age 31) Dundee, Scotland
- Height: 1.54 m (5 ft 1 in)

Figure skating career
- Country: Great Britain
- Skating club: Dundee ISC
- Began skating: 2002
- Retired: 12 May 2023

Natasha McKay (born 14 January 1995) is a former competitive Scottish figure skater that competed in ladies' singles for Great Britain. She is the 2018 Golden Bear of Zagreb champion, the 2017 Skate Helena champion, the 2017 Open d'Andorra champion, and a six-time British national champion (2017–2020, 2022–23).

== Personal life ==
McKay was born on 14 January 1995 in Dundee, Scotland. She attended St John's School in Dundee before moving, around 2008, to Coventry, England. She returned to Dundee by 2012.

== Career ==
McKay began learning to skate in 2002. In a 2018 interview, she recalled, "I begged my mum for skates for a whole year [...] until she gave in."

McKay won the junior bronze medal at the British Championships in the 2009–10 season. In February 2011, she placed 22nd at the European Youth Olympic Festival in Liberec, Czech Republic. She was coached by Yuri Bureiko in Coventry.

In the 2012–13 season, McKay made her only appearance on the ISU Junior Grand Prix series, placing 24th in Bled, Slovenia, and won her second junior national bronze medal. She was coached by Debi and Simon Briggs in Dundee, Scotland.

She won the senior bronze medal at the British Championships in the 2014–15 season and finished 5th the following year.

McKay won gold at the Open d'Andorra in November 2016 and became the British national champion the following month. In January 2017, she took gold at Skate Helena. She was named in the British team to the 2017 European Championships in Ostrava. In the Czech Republic, she ranked 24th in the short program, giving her the final qualifying spot, and then rose to 18th overall by placing 16th in the free skate.

In December 2018, McKay won her third consecutive national title.

At the 2019 World Championships, McKay qualified for the free skate for the first time and placed twenty-first overall.

British champion for a fourth time in 2020, McKay was assigned to compete at the World Championships in Montreal, but these were cancelled as a result of the coronavirus pandemic.

With the lockdowns in Britain greatly affecting the availability of ice time, McKay temporarily relocated to Bradford in West Yorkshire during the summer of 2020 until the Scottish government revised its guidelines. McKay was named to the British team for the 2021 European Championships, but they were cancelled as a result of the ongoing pandemic. Additional lockdown measures introduced by the Scottish government after Christmas resulted in her only being able to train four days a week, an hour and a half a day. Competing at the 2021 World Championships in Stockholm, McKay placed twenty-third. This result qualified a place for Great Britain at the 2022 Winter Olympics in Beijing.

McKay was fifteenth at the 2021 CS Finlandia Trophy to begin the Beijing Olympic season. After winning another British national title, she was named to the British Olympic team. She said it "means everything to me to get to the Olympics – I've been dreaming of this since I was a little girl watching it on television." Before the Games, she finished seventeenth at the 2022 European Championships. McKay was twenty-seventh in the short program of the Olympic women's event, and did not advance to the free skate. She then finished twenty-third at the 2022 World Championships.

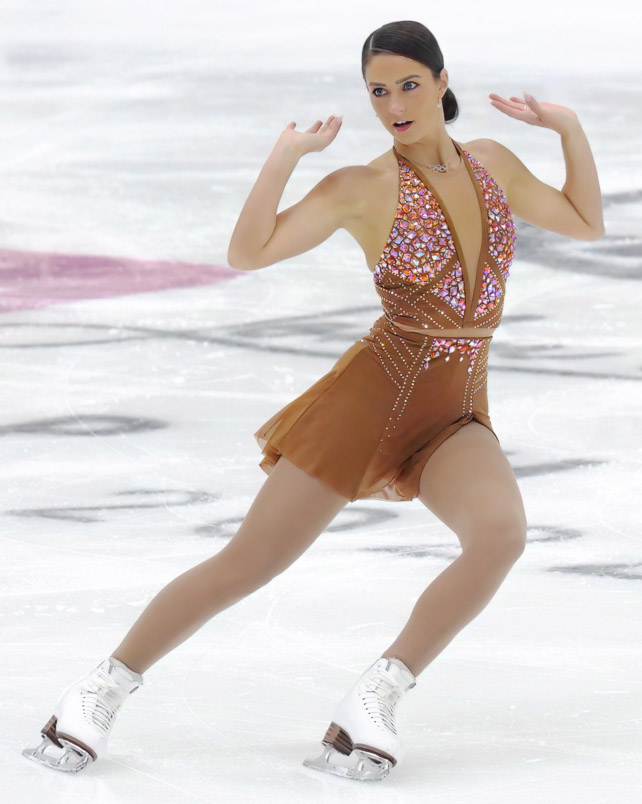
McKay competing her short program at the 2022 MK John Wilson Trophy

Originally intending to retire after the Olympics, McKay opted to continue for at least one more season, citing the time lost due to the pandemic. She was sixteenth at the 2022 CS Finlandia Trophy to begin the season. Following the cancellation of the Cup of China as a result of Chinese pandemic measures, McKay had the unique opportunity to participate in a Grand Prix on home soil when British Ice Skating hosted the 2022 MK John Wilson Trophy in Sheffield. She called the event "the last thing on my skating bucket list," noting it was "the biggest competition I've ever done on home ice."

McKay announced her retirement on May 12, 2023.

== Programs ==
Season	Short program	Free skating	Exhibition
2022–2023	Sealion by Feist choreo. by Mark Pillay	Burlesque: Express performed by Christina Aguilera; Welcome to Burlesque performed by Cher; The Beautiful People performed by Christina Aguilera choreo. by Mark Pillay	Spice Up Your Life; Viva Forever; Wannabe by Spice Girls
2021–2022	Sealion by Feist choreo. by Mark Pillay	5 Years (from Ocean's 8) by Daniel Pemberton; Best Friend by Sofi Tukker; Moog Necklace; Game On (from Ocean's 8) by Daniel Pemberton	
2019–2021	Song for the Little Sparrow by Abel Korzeniowski	5 Years (from Ocean's 8) by Daniel Pemberton; Best Friend by Sofi Tukker; Moog Necklace; Game On (from Ocean's 8) by Daniel Pemberton	
2018–2019	Song for the Little Sparrow by Abel Korzeniowski	Rondo Capriccioso by Camille Saint-Saëns	
2017–2018	El Tango de Roxanne (from Moulin Rouge!)	Rondo Capriccioso by Camille Saint-Saëns	
2016–2017	El Tango de Roxanne (from Moulin Rouge!)	The Swan (from The Carnival of the Animals) by Camille Saint-Saëns; Black Swan by Pyotr Tchaikovsky, Clint Mansell	
2012–2013	The Sleeping Beauty by Pyotr Tchaikovsky	Music by Lady Gaga	

== Competitive highlights ==
GP: Grand Prix; CS: Challenger Series; JGP: Junior Grand Prix

=== 2016-17 to Present ===
International
Event	16–17	17–18	18–19	19–20	20–21	21–22	22–23
Olympics						27th	
Worlds	32nd	32nd	21st	C	23rd	23rd	
Europeans	18th	27th	20th	23rd	C	16th	19th
GP Wilson Trophy							11th
CS Alpen Trophy			9th				
CS Cup of Austria						14th	
CS Finlandia Trophy		18th	20th			15th	16th
CS Lombardia Trophy				12th			
CS Nebelhorn Trophy		18th					
CS Warsaw Cup						11th	
Cup of Nice		6th					
Cup of Tyrol	5th		10th				
Denkova-Staviski		3rd		2nd			
Golden Bear			1st	3rd			
Int. Challenge Cup		6th		4th			
Merano Cup		2nd					
Open d'Andorra	1st						
Skate Helena	1st						
Tayside Trophy				1st		1st	3rd
Volvo Open Cup			6th				
National
British Champ.	1st	1st	1st	1st	C	1st	1st

=== Earlier career ===
International: Junior
Event	09–10	10–11	11–12	12–13	13–14	14–15	15–16
JGP Slovenia				24th			
Cup of Nice		14th	15th				
EYOF		22nd					
NRW Trophy	18th						
National
British Champ.	3rd J	4th J	4th J	3rd J	4th J	3rd	5th
