= Leri Kenchadze =

Bulgarian pair skater

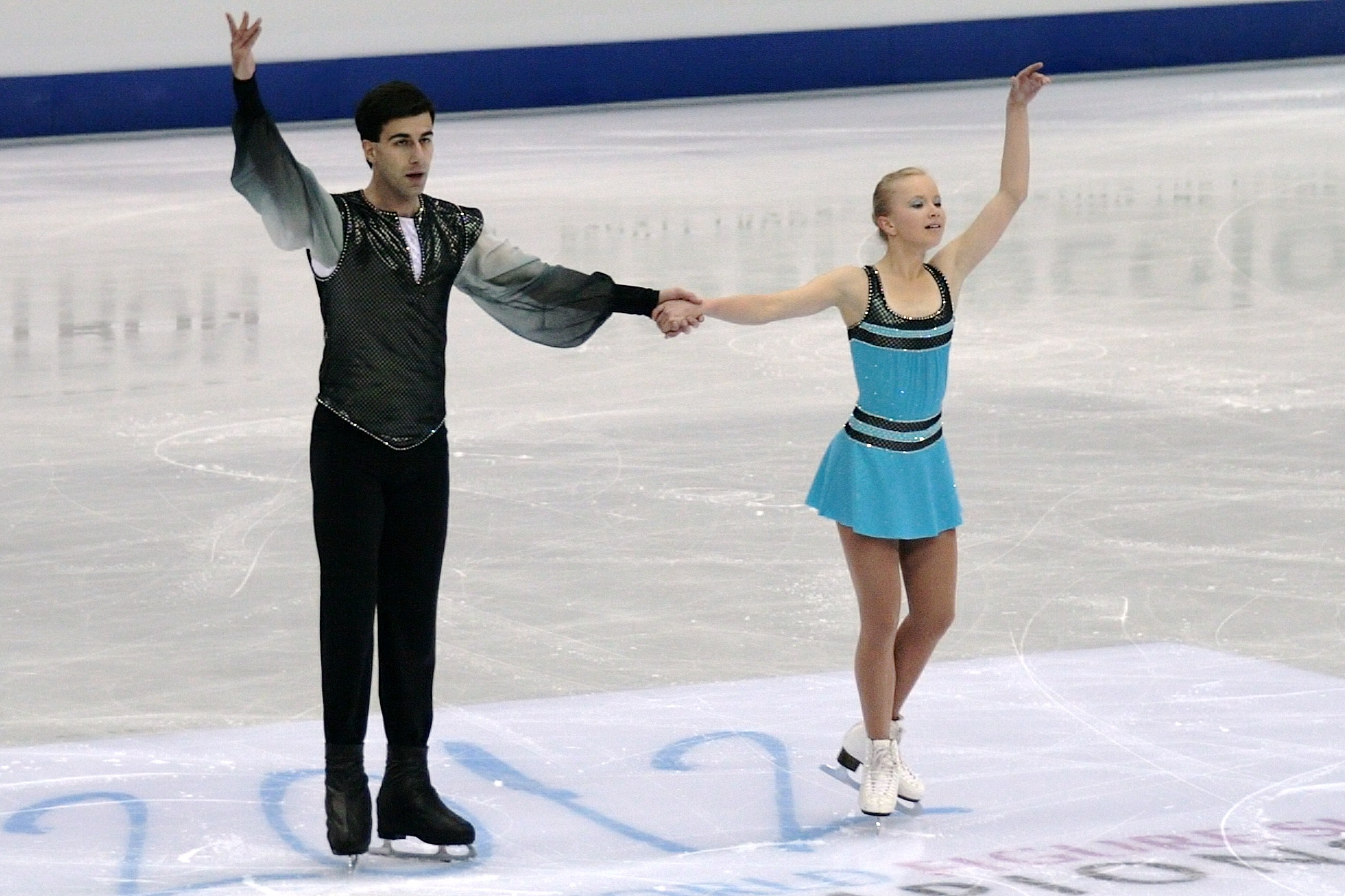
- Makarova/Kenchadze at the 2012 World Championships

Personal information
- Native name: Leri Kenchadze ლერი კენჭაძე Лери Кенчадзе
- Born: 16 August 1986 (age 40) Georgia, Tbilisi | Soviet Union
- Height: 1.86 m (6 ft 1 in)

Figure skating career
- Country: Bulgaria
- Partner: Elizaveta Makarova, Alexandra Malakhova, Alexandra Goncharuk, Nina Ivanova
- Coach: Hristo Turlakov, Andrei Lutai
- Skating club: Tilburgse Kunstrijvereniging
- Began skating: 1993
- Retired: 2015

Leri Kenchadze (Georgian: ლერი კენჭაძე, Bulgarian: Лери Кенчадзе, born 16 August 1986) is a Georgian figure skating choreographer/coach and former competitive pair skater. With Elizaveta Makarova, he is the 2013 Toruń Cup champion, the 2015 Bavarian Open bronze medalist, and a four-time Bulgarian national champion. He has competed at multiple European & World Championships.

== Personal life ==
Leri Kenchadze was born 16 August 1986 in Tbilisi, Georgian SSR, Soviet Union. He is the twin brother of Georgi Kenchadze. Following his sports retirement, Kenchadze has been working as a choreographer/coach.

After living in Bulgaria for over a decade, he moved to Denmark. He was a head coach at Skøjteklub København in Copenhagen, Denmark. He joined the club in August 2015. In 2017, he moved to the Netherlands. Currently he lives in Waalwijk, Netherlands. On May 7th, 2023, his daughter, Maxine Kenchadze, came into the world.

In 2020, Kenchadze introduced Paradice Sport, a brand specializing in figure skating clothing. Simultaneously, he initiated figure skating camps under the same label.

== Competitive career ==
Kenchadze competed for Bulgaria throughout his career. He appeared as a single skater through the 2005–06 season.

Kenchadze began competing in pair skating in the 2006–07 season, partnering Nina Ivanova. In 2009–10, he skated with Alexandra Goncharuk. The following season, he partnered Alexandra Malakhova. Coached by Pavel Kitashev. (Nina Mozer's Team)

In 2011, Kenchadze teamed up with Elizaveta Makarova. The pair trained in Sofia, coached by Hristo Turlakov and Andrei Lutai. Makarova/Kenchadze competed at four European Championships and three World Championships. They became the first ever pair from Bulgaria to perform a throw triple jump and triple twist successfully at European and World Championships.

Kenchadze retired from competitive skating after the 2014–15 season.

== Programs ==
=== With Makarova ===
Season	Short program	Free skating
2014–15	Flamenco by unknown	Heart of Courage; Protectors of the Earth by Two Steps from Hell
2013–14	Tango Amore by Edvin Marton	Heart of Courage; Protectors of the Earth by Two Steps from Hell
2012–13	Tango Amore by Edvin Marton	Romeo and Juliet by Nino Rota; Romeo and Juliet performed by Edvin Marton
2011–12	Gypsy Dances	Romeo and Juliet by Nino Rota; Romeo and Juliet performed by Edvin Marton

=== With Malakhova ===
Season	Short program	Free skating
2010–11	Pirates of the Caribbean by Klaus Badelt and Hans Zimmer	Rhapsody in Rock by Robert Wells

== Competitive highlights ==
CS: Challenger Series; JGP: Junior Grand Prix

=== With Makarova ===
International
Event	2011–12	2012–13	2013–14	2014–15
World Champ.	11th P	17th	23rd	
European Champ.	17th	12th	18th	13th
CS Golden Spin				8th
Bavarian Open				3rd
Challenge Cup				4th
Golden Spin		3rd		
Ice Challenge	6th	5th		
Nebelhorn Trophy			16th	
NRW Trophy		6th	4th	
Toruń Cup		1st		
National
Bulgarian Champ.	1st	1st	1st	1st
P = Preliminary round

=== With Ivanova, Goncharuk, and Malakhova ===
International
Event	2006–07 with Ivanova	2009–10 with Goncharuk	2010–11 with Malakhova
World Champ.			22nd
Golden Spin			8th
Mont Blanc Trophy			4th
NRW Trophy		7th	
Toruń Cup			2nd
National
Bulgarian Champ.	1st	2nd	

=== Single skating ===
International
Event	2002–03	2003–04	2004–05	2005–06
Crystal Skate				11th
International: Junior
JGP Bulgaria				22nd
Skate Helena	2nd J			
National
Bulgarian Champ.	4th	5th	5th	
J = Junior level
