= Maria Levushkina =

Bulgarian figure skater

Personal information
- Native name: Мария Левушкина (Bulgarian)
- Other names: Mariya
- Born: 18 July 2004 (age 21) Varna, Bulgaria
- Home town: Sofia, Bulgaria & Moscow, Russia
- Height: 1.62 m (5 ft 4 in)

Figure skating career
- Country: Bulgaria
- Discipline: Women's singles
- Coach: Svetlana Sokolovskaya; Andrei Lutai; Stanislav Zakharov
- Skating club: Denkova-Staviski Skating Club
- Began skating: 2008

Medal record
Bulgarian Championships
Bronze medal – third place	2021 Sofia	Singles

Maria Levushkina (Bulgarian: Мария Левушкина; born 18 July 2004) is a Bulgarian figure skater. She is a two-time Bulgarian junior national champion (2019–20) and competed in the final segment at the 2020 World Junior Championships.

== Personal life ==
Levushkina was born in Varna, Bulgaria and has a brother who played hockey. The family moved to Moscow when she was four for her parents' work, though they continued to spend summers in Bulgaria.

== Career ==
Levushkina began skating in Moscow when she was young. She continued to train in Moscow as well as in Sofia.

In 2018, Levushkina competed in her first ISU Junior Grand Prix series. She competed at the stages in Yerevan and Linz and finished in 10th place in both. The next season, on the 2019–20 Junior Grand Prix series, her first Grand Prix assignment was in Riga; she was 9th after the short program, but she skated a clean free skate and improved her free skate personal best by 20 points to end in 7th. At her second assignment in Chelyabinsk, she placed 9th. In October, she competed at the Denis Ten Memorial Challenge in won bronze in the junior women's category.

Levushkina hoped to compete at the 2020 Winter Youth Olympics after winning one of the four country quotas available through performance on the Junior Grand Prix series. However, although she represented Bulgaria, she did not have Bulgarian citizenship. She applied in August, and the Bulgarian Olympic Committee and the Bulgarian Skating Federation attempted to help her receive a passport before the deadline in December. Ultimately, Ivelina Baycheva was given the spot instead.

Levushkina competed at the 2020 World Junior Championships in March, where she reached the free skate and finished in 23rd place.

The 2020 Junior Grand Prix and many other competitions were cancelled due to the COVID-19 pandemic, but in February 2021, Levushkina competed in the Bulgarian Championships as a senior and won the bronze medal. In December, she competed at the Golden Spin of Zagreb, where she finished 17th.

== Programs ==
Season	Short program	Free skating
2020–2021	Procuro Olvidarte; by Guadalupe Pineda feat. Raúl Di Blasio	Kill Bill (soundtrack); Twisted Nevue; by Bernard Herrmann: Goodnight Moon; by Shivaree
2019–2020	Les moulins de mon cœur by Michel Legrand performed by Guadalupe Pineda choreo. by Stanislav Zakharov	Hallelujah by Leonard Cohen performed by Alexandra Burke choreo. by Stanislav Zakharov
2018–2019	The Feeling Begins (from Passion) by Peter Gabriel choreo. by Vitali Butikov	Tanguera by Astor Piazzolla; Assassin's Tango (from Mr. & Mrs. Smith) by John Powell choreo. by Vitali Butikov

== Competitive highlights ==
CS: Challenger Series; JGP: Junior Grand Prix

International
Event	18–19	19–20	20–21	21–22
CS Golden Spin of Zagreb				17th
Sofia Trophy			5th	
International: Junior
Junior Worlds		23rd		
JGP Armenia	10th			
JGP Austria	10th			
JGP France				15th
JGP Latvia		7th		
JGP Russia		9th		
Crystal Skate	2nd			
Denis Ten Memorial		3rd		
Denkova-Staviski	2nd	1st		
Egna Trophy	7th			
Ice Star		6th		
Skate Helena	4th			
Sofia Trophy	2nd	1st		6th
Toruń Cup		1st		
National
Bulgarian Champ.	1st J	1st J	3rd	

== Detailed results ==
=== Senior level ===
2021–2022 season
Date	Event	SP	FS	Total
7-11 December 2021	2021 CS Golden Spin of Zagreb	17; 44.23	17; 85.72	17; 129.95
2020–2021 season
Date	Event	SP	FS	Total
12–14 February 2021	2021 Bulgarian Championships	3; 54.94	2; 103.59	3; 158.53

=== Junior level ===
2019–2020 season
Date	Event	SP	FS	Total
2–8 March 2020	2020 World Junior Championships	23; 50.60	23; 78.71	23; 129.31
12–16 February 2020	2020 Sofia Trophy	1; 60.64	3; 89.28	1; 149.92
7–9 February 2020	2020 Bulgarian Championships	1; 60.72	2; 95.09	1; 155.81
7–12 January 2020	2020 Mentor Toruń Cup	2; 53.50	3; 95.98	1; 149.48
29 Nov. – 1 Dec. 2019	2019–20 Bulgarian Championships	1; 60.51	1; 106.89	1; 167.40
12–17 November 2019	2019 Denkova-Staviski Cup	1; 55.89	1; 101.26	1; 157.15
14–17 October 2019	2019 Ice Star	6; 48.21	4; 97.59	6; 145.80
9–12 October 2019	2019 Denis Ten Memorial Challenge	3; 56.18	3; 97.17	3; 153.35
11–14 September 2019	2019 JGP Russia	9; 53.94	13; 90.34	9; 144.28
4–7 September 2019	2019 JGP Latvia	9; 55.23	7; 106.03	7; 161.26
2018–2019 season
Date	Event	SP	FS	Total
28–31 March 2019	2019 Egna Spring Trophy	4; 51.46	7; 79.13	7; 130.59
5–10 February 2019	2019 Sofia Trophy	1; 56.51	2; 96.91	2; 153.42
17–19 January 2019	2019 Skate Helena	6; 45.70	3; 93.77	4; 139.47
27 Nov. – 1 Dec. 2018	2018 Denkova-Staviski Cup	2; 49.60	3; 85.59	2; 135.19
16–18 November 2018	2018–19 Bulgarian Championships	2; 49.41	1; 98.00	1; 147.41
24–28 October 2018	2018 Crystal Skate	1; 44.76	3; 76.80	2; 121.56
10–13 October 2018	2018 JGP Armenia	11; 46.09	10; 86.97	10; 133.06
29 Aug. – 1 Sept. 2018	2018 JGP Austria	12; 45.05	10; 81.91	10; 126.96
