= Elizaveta Makarova =

Russian pair skater

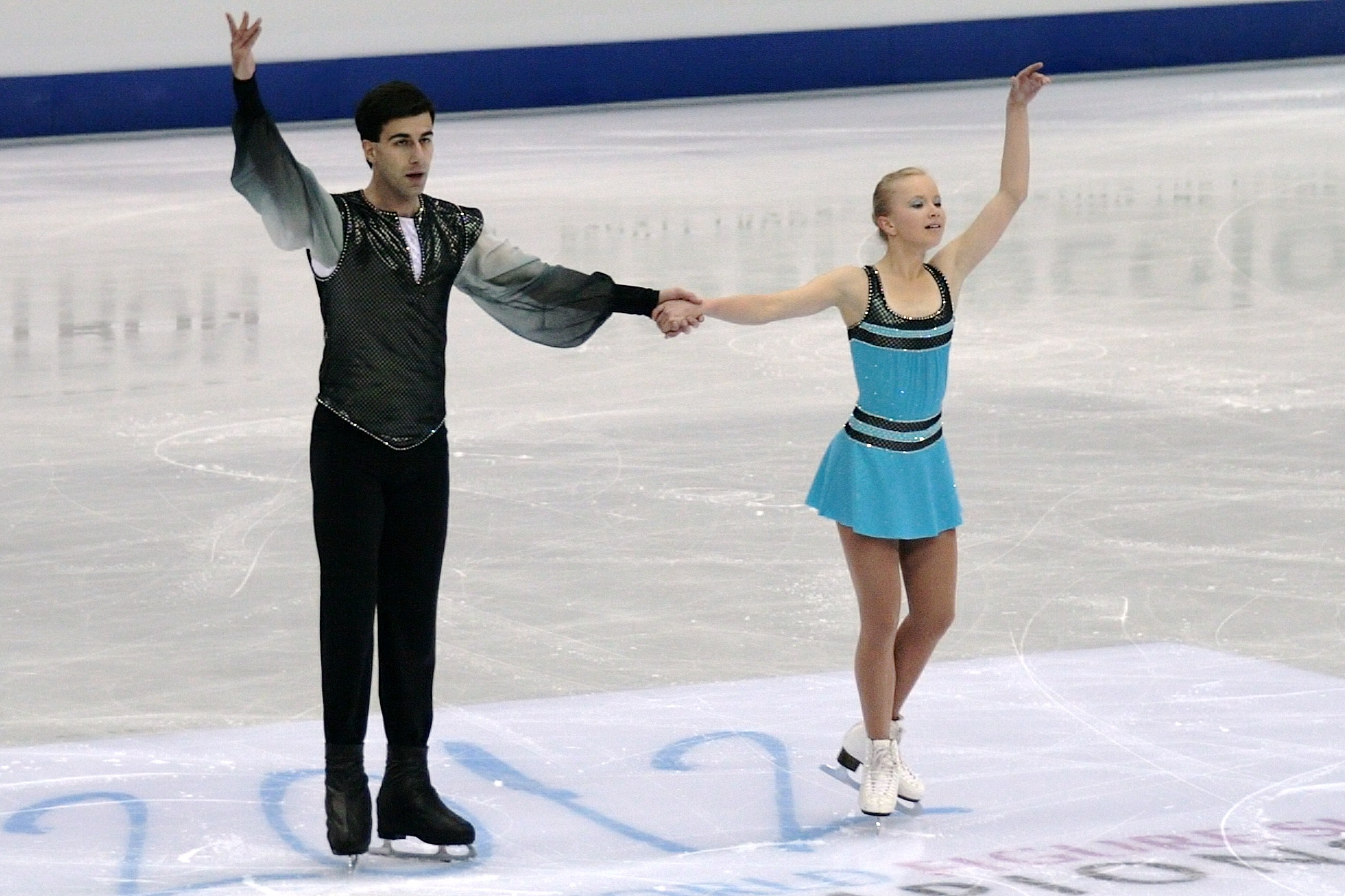
- Elizaveta Makarova and Leri Kenchadze at the 2012 World Championships

Personal information
- Native name: Елизавета Дмитриевна Макарова
- Full name: Elizaveta Dmitriyevna Makarova
- Born: 17 June 1994 (age 32) Moscow, Russia
- Height: 1.62 m (5 ft 4 in)

Figure skating career
- Country: Bulgaria
- Discipline: Pair skating
- Partner: Leri Kenchadze, Alexei Shemet
- Coach: Hristo Turlakov, Andrei Lutai
- Skating club: Dance on Ice Denkova-Staviski
- Began skating: 2000

Elizaveta Dmitriyevna Makarova (Russian: Елизавета Дмитриевна Макарова, born 17 June 1994) is a Russian pair skater who competed internationally for Bulgaria with Leri Kenchadze. They became the 2013 Toruń Cup champions, 2015 Bavarian Open bronze medalists, and four-time Bulgarian national champions. The pair competed at four European Championships and three World Championships.

Earlier in her career, Makarova competed for four seasons with Alexei Shemet in Russia.

== Programs ==
(with Kenchadze)

Season	Short program	Free skating
2014–15	Flamenco by unknown	Heart of Courage; Protectors of the Earth by Two Steps from Hell
2013–14	Tango Amore by Edvin Marton	Heart of Courage; Protectors of the Earth by Two Steps from Hell
2012–13	Tango Amore by Edvin Marton	Romeo and Juliet by Nino Rota; Romeo and Juliet performed by Edvin Marton
2011–12	Gypsy Dances	Romeo and Juliet by Nino Rota; Romeo and Juliet performed by Edvin Marton

== Competitive highlights ==
CS: Challenger Series

=== With Kenchadze for Bulgaria ===
International
Event	2011–12	2012–13	2013–14	2014–15
World Champ.	11th P	17th	23rd	
European Champ.	17th	12th	18th	13th
CS Golden Spin				8th
Bavarian Open				3rd
Challenge Cup				4th
Golden Spin		3rd		
Ice Challenge	6th	5th		
Nebelhorn Trophy			16th	
NRW Trophy		6th	4th	
Toruń Cup		1st		
National
Bulgarian Champ.	1st	1st	1st	1st

=== With Shemet ===
National
Event	2008–09	2009–10	2010–11
Russian Junior Champ.	11th	11th	
Russian Cup Final	6th J	5th J	4th
