= Bulgarian Figure Skating Championships =

National figure skating competition

- Status: Active
- Genre: National championships
- Frequency: Annual
- Venue: Winter Sports Palace
- Location: Sofia
- Country: Bulgaria
- Inaugurated: 1954
- Organizer: Bulgarian Skating Federation

The Bulgarian Figure Skating Championships (Bulgarian: Първенство на България по фигурно пързаляне) are an annual figure skating competition organized by the Bulgarian Skating Federation (Bulgarian: Българска федерация по кънки) to crown the national champions of Bulgaria. The first Bulgarian Championships were held in 1954 in Sofia.

Medals are awarded in men's singles, women's singles, pair skating, and ice dance at the senior and junior levels, although every discipline may not necessarily be held every year due to a lack of participants. Ivan Dinev currently holds the record for winning the most Bulgarian Championship titles in men's singles (with fifteen), while Evgenia Nikolova holds the record in women's singles (with ten). Elizaveta Makarova and Leri Kenchadze hold the record in pair skating (with four), although Kenchadze won an additional title with a different partner. Albena Denkova and Maxim Staviski hold the record in ice dance (with eleven), and Denkova won an additional two titles with a previous partner.

== History ==
There is evidence of skating in Bulgaria as early as 1929 with the establishment of skating clubs and the staging of a public exhibition of figure skating and speed skating. Skating was most common at the Borisova gradina, the oldest and most well-known public park in Sofia. More than 10,000 people participated in ice skating in Sofia. After World War II, progress in skating stalled due to the lack of indoor ice rinks and inadequate equipment. The Bulgarian Skating and Ice Hockey Federation was founded in 1949 to oversee figure skating, speed skating, and ice hockey in Bulgaria. The first Bulgarian Figure Skating Champions were held in 1954 at the Vasil Levski National Stadium in Sofia. The winners of the inaugural men's and women's events were Georgi Hristov and Elisaveta Ivanova, respectively. Bulgaria joined the International Skating Union in 1967. In 1985, The Bulgarian Skating and Ice Hockey Federation was split to form separate federations for figure skating, speed skating, and ice hockey.

== Senior medalists ==
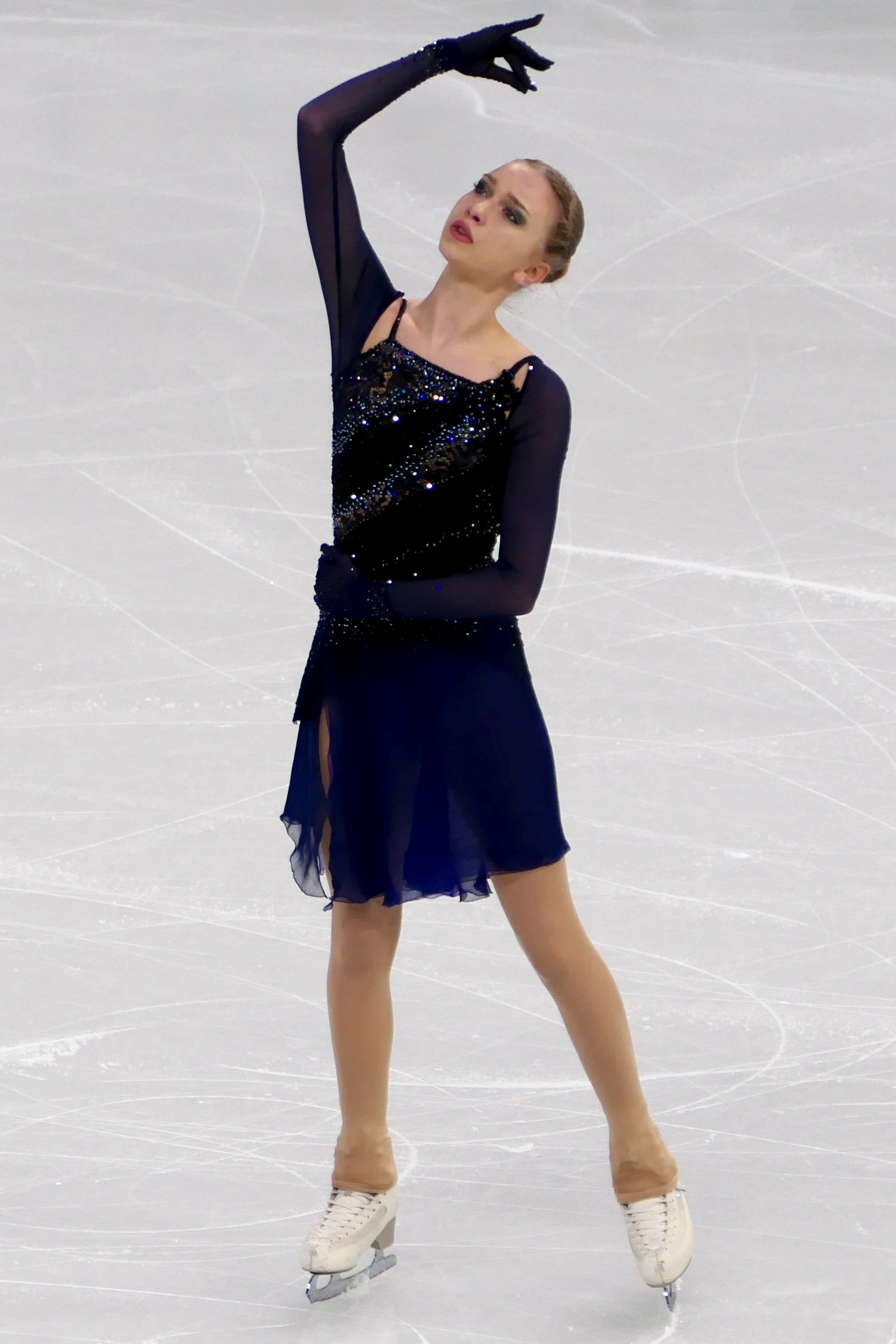
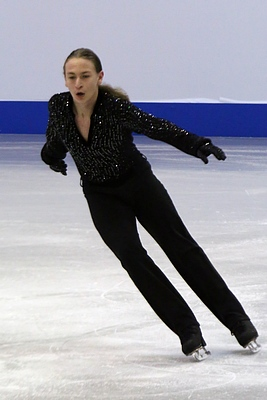
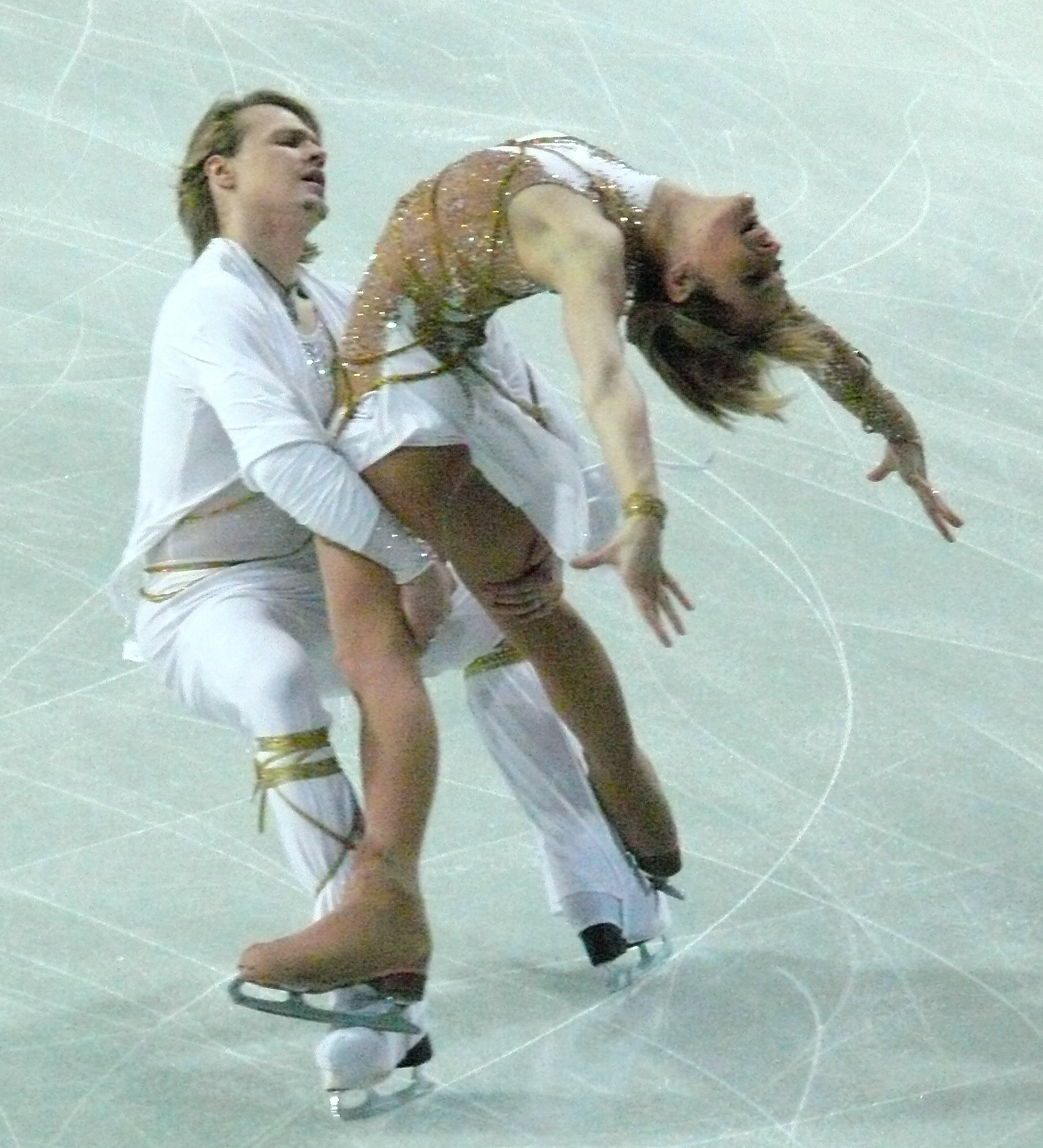
From left to right: Alexandra Feigin, six-time Bulgarian champion in women's singles; Larry Loupolover, four-time Bulgarian champion in men's singles; and Albena Denkova and Maxim Staviski, eleven-time Bulgarian champions in ice dance

=== Men's singles ===
Men's event medalists
Year	Location	Gold	Silver	Bronze	Ref.
1954	Sofia	Ivan Hristov			
1955					
1956					
1957					
1958					
1959					
1960		Ivan Hristov			
1961		Todor Barzov			
1962		Borislav Vandov			
1963		Dimitar Stefanov			
1964		Alexander Penchev			
1965		Borislav Vandov	Alexander Penchev	S. Popov	
1966					
1967		Emil Dimitrov			
1968		Alexander Penchev			
1969		Nikolai Ianev			
1970		Volodya Kanev			
1971		Nikolai Yanev	Alexander Penchev	Pl. Nikolov	
1972		Volodya Kanev			
1973		Volodya Kanev			
1974		Volodya Kanev			
1975					
1976					
1977					
1978					
1979		Boyko Aleksiev			
1980		Boyko Aleksiev			
1981		Boyko Aleksiev	No other competitors		
1982		Boyko Aleksiev	No other competitors		
1983		Boyko Aleksiev			
1984		Boyko Aleksiev			
1985		Boyko Aleksiev			
1986		Boyko Aleksiev			
1987		Boyko Aleksiev	No other competitors		
1988		Alexander Mladenov			
1989		Alexander Mladenov			
1990		Alexander Mladenov			
1991		Hristo Turlakov		Ivan Dinev	
1992		Ivan Dinev	Hristo Turlakov		
1993		Ivan Dinev	Hristo Turlakov		
1994	Sofia	Ivan Dinev	Hristo Turlakov	No other competitors	
1995		Ivan Dinev	Hristo Turlakov		
1996		Ivan Dinev	Hristo Turlakov		
1997		Ivan Dinev	Hristo Turlakov		
1998		Ivan Dinev	Hristo Turlakov	Naiden Borichev	
1999		Ivan Dinev	Hristo Turlakov	Naiden Borichev	
2000		Ivan Dinev	Hristo Turlakov	Naiden Borichev	
2001		Ivan Dinev	Hristo Turlakov	Naiden Borichev	
2002		Ivan Dinev	Hristo Turlakov	Naiden Borichev	
2003		Ivan Dinev	Hristo Turlakov	Naiden Borichev	
2004		Ivan Dinev	Naiden Borichev	Hristo Turlakov	
2005		Ivan Dinev	Naiden Borichev	Georgi Kenchadze	
2006		Ivan Dinev	Georgi Kenchadze	Ivan Dimitrov	
2007		Naiden Borichev	Georgi Kenchadze	No other competitors	
2008		Naiden Borichev	No other competitors		
2009		Georgi Kenchadze	No other competitors		
2010		Georgi Kenchadze	No other competitors		
2011		No competition held			
2012		Manol Atanassov	No other competitors		
2013		Manol Atanassov	No other competitors		
2014		Yasen Petkov	Pavel Savinov	No other competitors	
2015		Ivo Gatovski	No other competitors		
2016		Yasen Petkov	No other competitors		
2017		Nicky-Leo Obreykov	Ivo Gatovski	No other competitors	
2018		Nicky-Leo Obreykov	Aleksander Zlatkov	No other competitors	
2019		Nicky-Leo Obreykov	Aleksander Zlatkov	No other competitors	
2020		Larry Loupolover	Nicky-Leo Obreykov	No other competitors	
2021		Competition cancelled due to the COVID-19 pandemic			
2022		Larry Loupolover	Radoslav Marinov	Aleksander Zlatkov	
2023		Larry Loupolover	Beat Schümperli	Filip Kaimakchiev	
2024		Aleksander Zlatkov	Beat Schümperli	Filip Kaimakchiev	
2025		Aleksander Zlatkov	Beat Schümperli	Filip Kaimakchiev	
2026		Aleksander Zlatkov	Filip Kaimakchiev	Larry Loupolover	

=== Women's singles ===
Women's event medalists
Year	Location	Gold	Silver	Bronze	Ref.
1954	Sofia	Elisaveta Ivanova			
1955	Sofia				
1956	Sofia				
1957	Sofia				
1958	Sofia				
1959	Sofia				
1960	Sofia	Lyubka Tomova			
1961	Sofia	Lyubka Tomova			
1962	Sofia	Evgenia Nikolova			
1963	Sofia	Evgenia Nikolova			
1964	Sofia	Evgenia Nikolova			
1965	Sofia	Evgenia Nikolova	A. Miteva		
1966	Sofia	Evgenia Nikolova			
1967	Sofia	Evgenia Nikolova			
1968	Sofia	Emilia Kamenova			
1969	Sofia	Emilia Kamenova			
1970	Sofia	Emilia Kamenova			
1971	Sofia	Emilia Kamenova	V. Cholakova	R. Yoncheva	
1972	Sofia	Eva Drumeva			
1973	Sofia	Eva Drumeva			
1974	Sofia	Ludmila Plaharova			
1975	Sofia	Ludmila Plaharova			
1976	Sofia	Ludmila Plaharova			
1977	Sofia	Tsvetanka Alexandrova			
1978	Sofia	Margarita Dimitrova			
1979	Sofia	Margarita Dimitrova			
1980	Sofia	Margarita Dimitrova			
1981	Sofia	Tsvetanka Alexandrova			
1982	Sofia	Tsvetanka Alexandrova	Tatiana Yordanova		
1983	Sofia	Tsvetanka Alexandrova			
1984	Sofia	Svetla Staneva	Petya Gavazova	Vessela Baycheva	
1985	Sofia	Petya Gavazova	Svetla Staneva		
1986	Sofia	Biliana Vladimirova			
1987	Sofia	Petya Gavazova	Svetla Staneva	No other competitors	
1988	Sofia	Asia Aleksieva			
1989	Sofia	Tsvetelina Yankova			
1990	Sofia	Milena Marinovich			
1991	Sofia	Viktoria Dimitrova			
1992	Sofia	Viktoria Dimitrova			
1993	Sofia	Viktoria Dimitrova			
1994	Sofia	Sofia Penkova	Tsvetelina Abrasheva	No other competitors	
1995	Sofia	Sofia Penkova			
1996	Sofia	Sofia Penkova			
1997	Sofia	Sofia Penkova			
1998	Sofia	Sofia Penkova			
1999	Sofia	Anna Dimova	Sonia Radeva		
2000	Sofia	Hristina Vassileva			
2001	Sofia	Hristina Vassileva	Sonia Radeva	Nina Ivanova	
2002	Sofia	Hristina Vassileva		Sonia Radeva	
2003	Sofia	Hristina Vassileva	Sonia Radeva	Nina Ivanova	
2004	Sofia	Sonia Radeva	Hristina Vassileva	Lilia Dimitrova	
2005	Sofia	Sonia Radeva	Hristina Vassileva	Nina Ivanova	
2006	Sofia	Sonia Radeva	Hristina Vassileva	Manuela Stanukova	
2007	Sofia	Sonia Radeva	Hristina Vassileva	No other competitors	
2008	Sofia	Sonia Radeva	Hristina Vassileva	Nina Ivanova	
2009	Sofia	Sonia Radeva	Hristina Vassileva	Manuela Stanukova	
2010	Sofia	Sonia Radeva	Daniela Paskaleva	Hristina Vassileva	
2011	Sofia	No competition held			
2012	Sofia	Daniela Stoeva	No other competitors		
2013	Sofia	Anna Afonkina	Daniela Stoeva	No other competitors	
2014	Sofia	Anna Afonkina	Daniela Stoeva	No other competitors	
2015	Sofia	Daniela Stoeva	No other competitors		
2016	Sofia	Daniela Stoeva	Hristina Vassileva	Elizaveta Makarova	
2017	Sofia	Alexandra Feigin	Teodora Markova	Monika Yordanova	
2018	Sofia	Presiyana Dimitrova	Simona Gospodinova	Svetoslava Ryadkova	
2019	Sofia	Alexandra Feigin	Kristina Grigorova	Svetoslava Ryadkova	
2020	Sofia	Alexandra Feigin	Kristina Grigorova	Simona Gospodinova	
2021	Sofia	Competition cancelled due to the COVID-19 pandemic			
2022	Sofia	Kristina Grigorova	Ivelina Baicheva	Simona (Gospodinova) Georgieva	
2023	Sofia	Alexandra Feigin	Kristina Grigorova	Simona (Gospodinova) Georgieva	
2024	Sofia	Alexandra Feigin	Kristina Grigorova	Daniela Nikolova	
2025	Sofia	Alexandra Feigin	Kristina Grigorova	Galena Todorova	
2026	Sofia	Alexandra Feigin	Kristina Grigorova	Anastasia Yurchuk	

=== Pairs ===
Pairs event medalists
Year	Location	Gold	Silver	Bronze	Ref.
1990	Sofia				
1991	Sofia				
1992	Sofia				
1993	Sofia				
1994	Sofia	No pairs competitors			
1995	Sofia				
1996	Sofia				
1997	Sofia	N. Vlahova / A. Korchuchanov			
1998	Sofia				
1999	Sofia				
2000	Sofia				
2001	Sofia	No pairs competitors			
2002	Sofia	No pairs competitors			
2003	Sofia	No pairs competitors			
2004	Sofia	Rumiana Spassova; Stanimir Todorov	No other competitors		
2005	Sofia	Rumiana Spassova; Stanimir Todorov	No other competitors		
2006	Sofia	Rumiana Spassova; Stanimir Todorov	No other competitors		
2007	Sofia	Nina Ivanova; Leri Kenchadze	No other competitors		
2008	Sofia	No pairs competitors			
2009	Sofia	Nina Ivanova; Filip Zalevski	No other competitors		
2010	Sofia	Nina Ivanova; Filip Zalevski	Alexandra Goncharuk; Leri Kenchadze	No other competitors	
2011	Sofia	No competition held			
2012	Sofia	Elizaveta Makarova; Leri Kenchadze	No other competitors		
2013	Sofia	Elizaveta Makarova; Leri Kenchadze	No other competitors		
2014	Sofia	Elizaveta Makarova; Leri Kenchadze	No other competitors		
2015	Sofia	Elizaveta Makarova; Leri Kenchadze	No other competitors		
2016–26	Sofia	No pairs competitors since 2015			

=== Ice dance ===
Albena Denkova and Maxim Staviski, eleven-time Bulgarian champions ice dance, received the Order of Stara Planina, the highest honor that Bulgarian citizens can receive, in April 2007 from Georgi Parvanov, President of Bulgaria, for their contributions to sport in Bulgaria. In 2012, the first edition of the Denkova-Staviski Cup – an international figure skating competition named in honor of Denkova and Staviski – was held for the first time at the Winter Sports Palace in Sofia.

Ice dance event medalists
Year	Location	Gold	Silver	Bronze	Ref.
1954	Sofia				
1955	Sofia				
1956	Sofia				
1957	Sofia				
1958	Sofia				
1959	Sofia				
1960	Sofia				
1961	Sofia				
1962	Sofia				
1963	Sofia				
1964	Sofia				
1965	Sofia				
1966	Sofia				
1967	Sofia				
1968	Sofia	E. Nikolova / G. Velchev			
1969	Sofia	E. Nikolova / G. Velchev			
1970	Sofia				
1971	Sofia				
1972	Sofia				
1973	Sofia				
1974	Sofia				
1975	Sofia				
1976	Sofia				
1977	Sofia				
1978	Sofia				
1979	Sofia				
1980	Sofia	Hristina Boyanova; Yavor Ivanov			
1981	Sofia				
1982	Sofia				
1983	Sofia	Hristina Boyanova; Yavor Ivanov			
1984	Sofia				
1985	Sofia	Hristina Boyanova; Yavor Ivanov			
1986	Sofia	Hristina Boyanova; Yavor Ivanov			
1987	Sofia	Hristina Boyanova; Yavor Ivanov			
1988	Sofia	A. Raykova / P. Dimitrov			
1989	Sofia	Petya Gavazova / Nikolay Tonev			
1990	Sofia	Petya Gavazova / Nikolay Tonev			
1991	Sofia	Maria Hadjiiska / Hristo Nikolov			
1992	Sofia	Albena Denkova; Hristo Nikolov			
1993	Sofia	Albena Denkova; Hristo Nikolov			
1994	Sofia	Albena Denkova; Hristo Nikolov	No other competitors		
1995	Sofia	D. Aleksandrova / R. Yordanov			
1996	Sofia	Daniela Ivanova & Rumen Yordanov			
1997	Sofia	Daniela Ivanova & Rumen Yordanov			
1998	Sofia	Albena Denkova; Maxim Staviski			
1999	Sofia	Albena Denkova; Maxim Staviski			
2000	Sofia	Albena Denkova; Maxim Staviski			
2001	Sofia	Albena Denkova; Maxim Staviski	No other competitors		
2002	Sofia	Albena Denkova; Maxim Staviski	Ina Demireva; Tzvetan Georgiev	No other competitors	
2003	Sofia	Albena Denkova; Maxim Staviski	Ina Demireva; Tzvetan Georgiev	No other competitors	
2004	Sofia	Albena Denkova; Maxim Staviski	No other competitors		
2005	Sofia	Albena Denkova; Maxim Staviski	No other competitors		
2006	Sofia	Albena Denkova; Maxim Staviski	Ina Demireva; Juri Kurakin	Lora Semova; Dimitar Lichev	
2007	Sofia	Albena Denkova; Maxim Staviski	No other competitors		
2008	Sofia	Ina Demireva; Juri Kurakin	No other competitors		
2009	Sofia	Ina Demireva; Juri Kurakin	No other competitors		
2010	Sofia	No ice dance competitors			
2011	Sofia	No competition held			
2012	Sofia	Alexandra Chistyakova; Dimitar Lichev	No other competitors		
2013	Sofia	Sarah May Coward; Georgi Kenchadze	No other competitors		
2014–19	Sofia	No ice dance competitors			
2020	Sofia	Mina Zdravkova; Christopher Martin Davis	No other competitors		
2021–26	Sofia	No ice dance competitors since 2021			

== Junior medalists ==
=== Men's singles ===
Junior men's event medalists
Year	Location	Gold	Silver	Bronze	Ref.
2014–15	Sofia	No junior men's competitors			
2016	Sofia	Nikola Zlatanov	No other competitors		
2017	Sofia	Alexander Zlatkov	Nikola Zlatanov	No other competitors	
2018	Sofia	Radoslav Marinov	Vasil Dimitrov	No other competitors	
2019	Sofia	Tobija Harms	No other competitors		
2020	Sofia	Vasil Dimitrov	No other competitors		
2021	Sofia	Competition cancelled due to the COVID-19 pandemic			
2022	Sofia	Filip Kaymakchiev	Alexandar Kachamakov	Rosen Peev	
2023	Sofia	Rosen Peev	Alexandar Kachamakov	No other competitors	
2024	Sofia	Dean Mihaylov	Yoanis Apostolu	Alexandar Kachamakov	
2025	Sofia	Dean Mihaylov	Rosen Peev	Kalojan Nalbantov	
2026	Sofia	Dean Mihaylov	Yoanis Apostolu	Rosen Peev	

=== Women's singles ===
Junior women's event medalists
Year	Location	Gold	Silver	Bronze	Ref.
2014	Sofia	Alexandra Feigin	Paolina Popova	Monika Yordanova	
2015	Sofia	Alexandra Feigin	Teodora Markova	Simona Arnaudova	
2016	Sofia	Alexandra Feigin	Simona Gospodinova	Simona Arnaudova	
2017	Sofia	Kristina Grigorova	Preslyana Dimitrova	Svetoslava Ryadkova	
2018	Sofia	Alexandra Feigin	Kristina Grigorova	Eliza Pancheva	
2019	Sofia	Maria Levushkina	Ivelina Baycheva	Thea Boeva	
2020	Sofia	Maria Levushkina	Ivelina Baycheva	Maria Ilinova	
2021	Sofia	Competition cancelled due to the COVID-19 pandemic			
2022	Sofia	Chiara Hristova	Daniela Stanimirova	Daniela Nikolova	
2023	Sofia	Chiara Hristova	Krista Georgieva	Marina Nikolova	
2024	Sofia	Chiara Hristova	Leilah Patten	Lia Lyubenova	
2025	Sofia	Lia Lyubenova	Chiara Hristova	Krista Georgieva	
2026	Sofia	Varvara Abramkina	Lia Lyubenova	Krista Georgieva	

== Records ==
Records
Discipline	Most championship titles			
Discipline	Skater(s)	No.	Years	Ref.
Men's singles	Ivan Dinev	15	1992–2006	
Women's singles	Evgenia Nikolova	10	1962–71	
Pairs	Elizaveta Makarova; Leri Kenchadze	4	2012–15	
Pairs	Leri Kenchadze; (Note: Leri Kenchadze won one championship title while partnered with Nina Ivanova (2007), and four with Elizaveta Makarova (2012–15).)	5	2007; 2012–15	
Ice dance	Albena Denkova; Maxim Staviski	11	1997–2007	
Ice dance	Albena Denkova; (Note: Albena Denkova won two championship titles with Hristo Nikolov (1992–93), and eleven with Maxim Staviski (1997–2007).)	13	1992–93; 1997–2007	
