= Hristina Vassileva =

Bulgarian figure skating coach, choreographer and former competitor

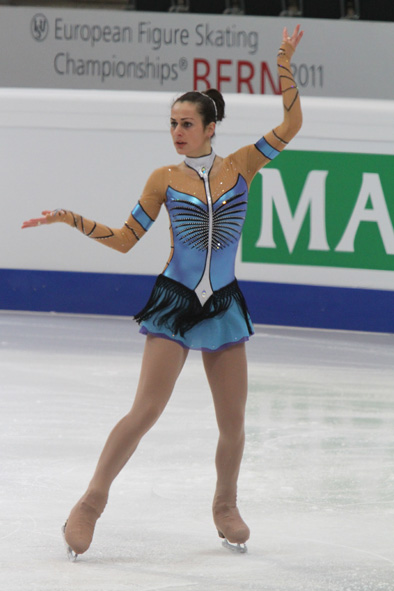
- Vassileva at the 2011 European Championships

Personal information
- Native name: Христина Василева-Жечева
- Other names: Vassileva-Zhecheva
- Born: July 22, 1984 (age 41) Sofia, Bulgaria
- Height: 1.70 m (5 ft 7 in)

Figure skating career
- Country: Bulgaria
- Skating club: KFP Levski Sofia
- Began skating: 1988
- Retired: 2017

Hristina Vassileva-Zhecheva (Bulgarian: Христина Василева-Жечева, born July 22, 1984) is a Bulgarian figure skating coach and choreographer in USA, and former competitor. She is six time Bulgarian national champion and reached the free skate at four ISU Championships. She achieved her best result, 16th, at the 2001 European Championships.

== Personal life ==
Hristina Vassileva was born on 22 July 1984 in Sofia, Bulgaria. She is the granddaughter of Dimitar Drazhev. Since her marriage to Vyacheslav Zhechev in 2010, her surname may also appear as Vassileva-Zhecheva. She has two daughters – Isabella (born 2012) and Sofia (born 2013). In July 2016, the family moved to Miami, Florida, United States for work.

== Career ==
Vassileva was selected to represent Bulgaria at the 2000 World Junior Championships in Oberstdorf, Germany. Ranked 9th in qualifying group B, she advanced to the short program, where she placed 15th, allowing her to compete in the final segment. She placed 20th in the free skate and 19th overall.

In the 2000–01 season, Vassileva was named in Bulgaria's team to the 2001 European Championships in Bratislava, Slovakia. She placed 18th in the short and 15th in the free, resulting in a final placement of 16th. The 2001 World Junior Championships were held in Sofia, Bulgaria. Like a year earlier, Vassileva finished 19th overall, after placing 25th in the short program and 16th in the free. Concluding her season, she progressed past the qualifying round at the 2001 World Championship in Vancouver, British Columbia, Canada, but was eliminated after placing 27th in the short program.

Vassileva competed at the 2002 World Championships in Nagano, Japan but did not advance to the short program. She was coached by Ludmila Mladenova in Sofia until the end of the 2001–02 season.

In 2002–03, Vassileva trained under Rafael Arutyunyan in Los Angeles, as well as in Sofia. She was unable to reach the free skate at an ISU Championship, being eliminated after the short program at the 2003 European Championships in Malmö, Sweden, and after the qualifying round at the 2003 World Championships in Washington, D.C.

In 2003–04, Naiden Borichev began coaching Vassileva in Sofia, while continuing his competitive career in men's singles. Vassileva failed to progress out of her qualifying group at the 2004 World Championships in Dortmund, Germany.

By the 2010–11 season, Vassileva was being coached by Teodor Yotov in Sofia. She reached her fourth ISU Championship free skate at the 2011 European Championships in Bern, Switzerland. Ranked 20th in the short and 22nd in the free, she finished 23rd overall. In April 2011, she won the Bulgarian national title.

Vassileva made no competitive appearances because of maternity reasons during the following seasons until October 2015, when she returned and competed at the 2015 Denkova-Staviski Cup in Sofia. In December, she won another Bulgarian national title. She also competed at the 2015 CS Golden Spin of Zagreb, NRW Trophy, Sofia Trophy, and Sportland Trophy.

In 2016, Vassileva began training with Kent Johnson at Kendall Ice Arena in Miami, Florida. She also works as a coach at the rink.

In January 2017, Vassileva attended at European Figure Skating Championship in Ostrava, Czech Republic. At the championship she was the oldest skater with 32 years of age. Because of injury she didn't skate her best and after the competition she decided to retire after almost 29 years on the ice. Now she works successfully as a Figure Skating Coach.

== Programs ==
Season	Short program	Free skating
2016–17	Santa Maria (del Buen Ayre) by Gotan Project	"Юначе карат вързано" - "Hero lead him tied" (Bulgarian folk song inspired instrumental: high-pitched bagpipe, percussions and synthesizer;) by Petar Atanaschev and Kiril Dobrev
2015–16	Santa Maria (del Buen Ayre) by Gotan Project	Harem by Sarah Brightman
2010–11	Santa Maria (del Buen Ayre) by Gotan Project	Harem by Sarah Brightman
2006–07	Catwoman by Klaus Badelt	Devdas
2004–05	Aurora performed by Vanessa-Mae	Devdas
2003–04	Aurora performed by Vanessa-Mae	Music by Gipsy Kings Santana Cirque du Soleil Shakira
2002–03	Jazz	Music by Gipsy Kings Santana Cirque du Soleil Shakira
2001–02	Coming to America by Nile Rodgers	All That Jazz (from Chicago) by John Kander
2000–01	Zorba the Greek by Mikis Theodorakis	Latin music

== Results ==
CS: Challenger Series; JGP: Junior Grand Prix

=== 2004–05 to 2015–16 ===
International
Event	04–05	05–06	06–07	07–08	08–09	09–10	10–11	15–16	16–17
Worlds			37th				37th		
Europeans							23rd		34th
CS Denkova-Staviski								13th	
CS Golden Spin								16th	
Crystal Skate				4th					
Golden Spin	6th	11th					12th		
Ice Challenge							18th		
Nepela Memorial		11th							
NRW Trophy				3rd		17th		16th	
Schäfer Memorial		14th							
Sofia Trophy								5th	
Sportland Trophy								8th	
Universiade			19th						
National
Bulgarian Champ.	2nd	2nd	2nd	2nd	2nd	3rd	1st	2nd	
WD = Withdrew

=== 1997–98 to 2003–04 ===
International
Event	97–98	98–99	99–00	00–01	01–02	02–03	03–04
Worlds				26th	35th	39th	31st
Europeans				16th		28th	
Golden Spin				14th	21st		9th
International: Junior
Junior Worlds			19th	19th			
JGP Bulgaria		23rd			22nd		13th
JGP Netherlands			20th		19th		
JGP Poland				12th			
JGP Slovenia							10th
JGP Sweden			22nd				
Crystal Skate				1st J			
National
Bulgarian Champ.	4th		1st	1st	1st	1st	2nd
J = Junior level
