= Sonia Radeva =

Bulgarian figure skater (born 1985)

Personal information
- Native name: Соня Радева
- Born: 11 March 1985 (age 41) Sofia, Bulgarian People's Republic
- Height: 1.68 m (5 ft 6 in)

Figure skating career
- Country: Bulgaria
- Skating club: SC Elit Sofia
- Began skating: 1990
- Retired: 2011

Sonia Radeva (Bulgarian: Соня Радева, born 11 March 1985 in Sofia) is a Bulgarian former competitive figure skater. She is a seven-time consecutive Bulgarian national champion (2003–2009) and reached the free skate at two ISU Championships – the 2005 European Championships in Turin, Italy, and the 2006 European Championships in Lyon, France.

== Biography ==
Radeva began skating at age 4 after she went to the rink with her mother and sister. She won seven consecutive national titles from 2003 to 2009 and came second at the Bulgarian Championships in the 2010–2011 season behind Hristina Vassileva.

During her career, Radeva worked as a caterer and then as a children's coach to pay for skating costs.

In 2006, Radeva made her only appearance on the Grand Prix series when she competed at the 2006 Trophée Éric Bompard. There she placed 11th in the short program and moved up to 10th place overall after the free skate.

In 2008, she injured her meniscus. Though she did not skate well at the Bulgarian Championships, she still won and was sent to the 2009 European Championships. The Bulgarian Skating Federation highlighted that they did not have many resources to assist and prepare athletes like Radeva.

Radeva herself later said that many athletes competing for Bulgaria trained outside of the country due to a lack of resources. For example, at the 2010 European Championships, Radeva wore skates that were four years old, had broken lace hooks, and were reinforced with duct tape, as she had waited six months to receive new skates, and on arrival they were defective. She reused a costume from the previous season that had been decorated by herself and her coach to save on costs. Radeva also said that the condition of the rink in Sofia where she trained was not very good.

The Bulgarian Skating Federation did not allow her or any other skaters to attempt to qualify for the 2010 Winter Olympics as they did not believe any would be able to do so. Radeva said that the skaters had trained for the final qualifying event, the 2009 Nebelhorn Trophy, and that she was sad to have not been given the chance to go.

Radeva halted her competitive career due to a lack of pay in Bulgaria and began performing in skating shows on cruise ships. Between trips, she trains children at the Winter Sports Palace in Sofia.

== Programs ==
Season	Short program	Free skating
2009–2010	Orisia	Poeta (Flamenco) by Vicente Amigo
2008–2009	Garvani (from The Neshka Roloveva Show)	Poeta (Flamenco) by Vicente Amigo
2007–2008	Flamenco by Jesse Cook	Music by Maksim Mrvica
2006–2007	Two Guitars by Paul Mauriat	Music by Maksim Mrvica
2005–2006	Desde Mexico by Raúl Di Blasio	Tango Flamenco; Cascada; Gypsy Passion by Jesse Cook
2004–2005	Schindler's List by John Williams	Music by Ara Gregorian
2003–2004	Schindler's List by John Williams	Music by Jesse Cook; Music by Buddha Bar
2001–2003	Indian music	The Secret Garden by Zbigniew Preisner; Reservoir Dogs

== Competitive highlights ==
GP: Grand Prix; JGP: Junior Grand Prix

International
Event	98–99	99–00	00–01	01–02	02–03	03–04	04–05	05–06	06–07	07–08	08–09	09–10	10–11
Worlds							32nd	34th		33rd	41st	41st	
Europeans						27th	22nd	16th	27th	34th	33rd	40th	
GP Bompard									10th				
Nebelhorn Trophy									10th				
Golden Spin of Zagreb							15th					8th	
Cup of Nice										9th	14th		
Crystal Skate								3rd			8th	8th	9th
NRW Trophy											15th		
Ondrej Nepela				21st				13th					
Merano Cup													9th
Mont Blanc Trophy													13th
Helena Pajovic				7th									
International: Junior
Junior Worlds				39th	39th	29th							
JGP Bulgaria				20th		15th							
JGP Croatia						15th							
Helena Pajovic						1st J							
Grand Prize SNP			18th J										
National
Bulgarian	2nd		2nd	3rd	2nd	1st	1st	1st	1st	1st	1st	1st	
J = Junior level
