= Larry Loupolover =

American figure skater

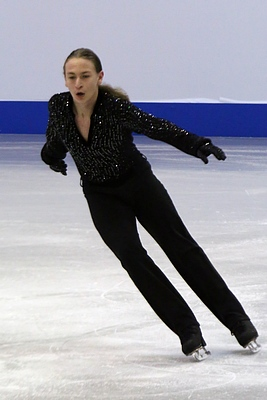
- Loupolover at the 2014 World Junior Championships

Personal information
- Born: April 8, 1999 (age 27) Brooklyn, New York, United States
- Home town: Sofia, Bulgaria
- Height: 1.70 m (5 ft 7 in)

Figure skating career
- Country: Bulgaria (since 2019); Azerbaijan (2013–19)
- Discipline: Men's singles
- Skating club: Sofia
- Began skating: 2006

Medal record
Representing Bulgaria
Bulgarian Championships
Gold medal – first place	2020 Sofia	Singles
Gold medal – first place	2021 Sofia	Singles
Gold medal – first place	2022 Sofia	Singles
Gold medal – first place	2023 Sofia	Singles

Larry Loupolover (born April 8, 1999) is an American figure skater who currently represents Bulgaria in men's singles and formerly represented Azerbaijan. He has won four senior international medals and qualified to the free skate at two European Championships (2015, 2020).

== Programs ==
Season	Short program	Free skating
2021–2022	Lucid Dreams; Come & Go by Juice Wrld	The Great Gig in the Sky; Money by Pink Floyd
2015–2017	Can't Take My Eyes Off You by Bob Crewe, Bob Gaudio	Once Upon a Time in America by Ennio Morricone
2014–2015	Libertango by Astor Piazzolla	Once Upon a Time in America by Ennio Morricone
2013–2014	Libertango by Astor Piazzolla	The Blizzard by Georgy Sviridov; Waltz; Romance

== Competitive highlights ==
=== Single skating (for Bulgaria) ===
International
Event	19–20	20–21	21–22	22–23	23–24	24–25	25–26	26–27
Worlds	C	33rd						
Europeans	23rd		33rd	27th				
CS Budapest		8th						
CS Lombardia Trophy			18th					
CS Nebelhorn Trophy			22nd					
CS Nepela Memorial				13th				
CS Tallinn Trophy								22nd
Black Sea Ice Cup						3rd	3rd	
Bosphorus Cup						8th		
Crystal Skate				4th		3rd		
Crystal Skate Spring							3rd	
Denkova-Staviski	4th			6th	4th		8th	
Dragon Trophy							2nd	
EduSport Trophy	1st					7th		
Jelgava Cup					4th			
Kaunas Cup					2nd			
Skate Helena					1st			
Sofia Trophy	1st	1st			5th		6th	
Tallink Hotels Cup		3rd					9th	
Tallinn Trophy			8th	8th				
World University Games				19th				
Volvo Open Cup	8th		5th		6th			
National
Bulgarian Champ.	1st	1st	1st	1st			3rd	

=== For Azerbaijan ===
International
Event	13–14	14–15	15–16	16–17	17–18	18–19
Worlds				36th	31st	
Europeans		23rd	32nd	31st	32nd	
CS Nebelhorn					21st	
CS Tallinn Trophy				9th		
Denkova-Staviski				4th		
Halloween Cup						5th
Ice Star			3rd	3rd		
Philadelphia					WD	
Santa Claus Cup			3rd		9th	
Toruń Cup			3rd			
International: Junior
Junior Worlds	38th	33rd			30th	
JGP Belarus					10th	
JGP Czech Rep.				17th		
JGP Estonia	20th					
JGP Poland	29th					
JGP U.S.			15th			
Santa Claus Cup	7th					
Tallinn Trophy		5th	5th			
Toruń Cup	5th	2nd				
Volvo Open Cup	11th					
National
Azerbaijan			1st	1st	1st	
