= Adam Hagara =

Slovak figure skater (born 2006)

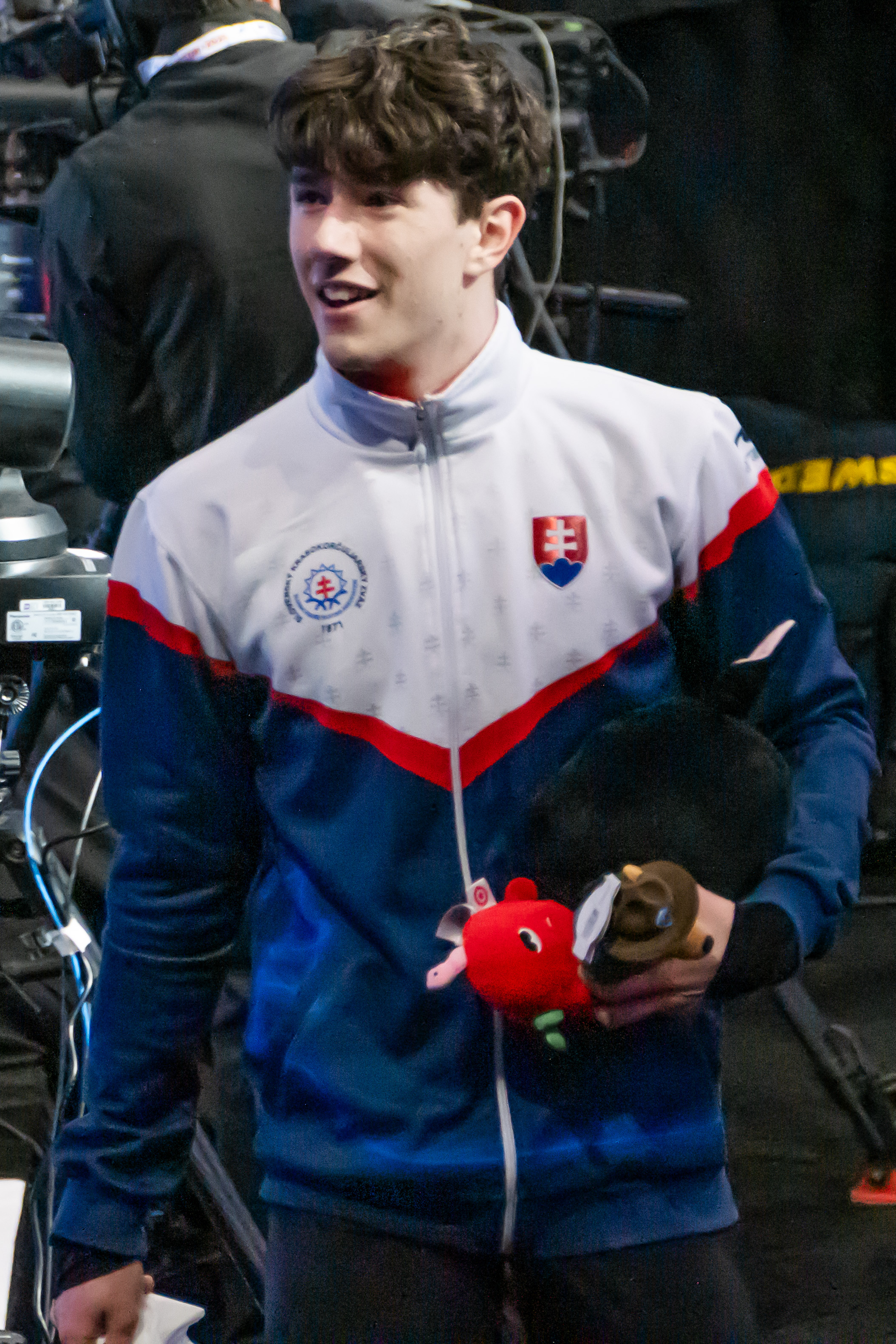
- Adam Hagara at the 2025 World Championships

Personal information
- Born: 26 April 2006 (age 20) Trnava, Slovakia
- Home town: Boleráz, Slovakia
- Height: 1.84 m (6 ft 0 in)

Figure skating career
- Country: Slovakia
- Discipline: Men's singles
- Coach: Vladimir Dvojnikov; Alexandra Hagarová
- Skating club: KK Trnava
- Began skating: 2010

Medal record
Slovak Championships
Gold medal – first place	2022 Spišská Nová Ves	Singles
Gold medal – first place	2023 Budapest	Singles
Gold medal – first place	2024 Turnov	Singles
Gold medal – first place	2025 Cieszyn	Singles
Gold medal – first place	2026 Presov	Singles
Winter Youth Olympics
Silver medal – second place	2024 Gangwon	Singles
World Junior Championships
Bronze medal – third place	2024 Taipei	Singles
Bronze medal – third place	2025 Debrecen	Singles
Junior Grand Prix Final
Bronze medal – third place	2023–24 Beijing	Singles

Adam Hagara (born 26 April 2006) is a Slovak figure skater. He is the 2024 Winter Youth Olympic silver medalist, two-time Junior World bronze medalist (2024, 2025), 2023–24 Junior Grand Prix Final bronze medalist and 2023 JGP Austria champion, and has seven senior international medals as well as five Slovak national titles (2022–2026).

He is the first Slovak figure skater to win a ISU Junior Grand Prix gold medal, to qualify and medal at a Grand Prix Final, to medal at an ISU championship event, and to land a clean quadruple jump in an ISU competition.

Hagara represented Slovakia at the 2026 Winter Olympics.

== Personal life ==
Hagara was born on 26 April 2006 in Trnava, Slovakia. He is the younger brother of Slovak figure skater, Alexandra Hagarová, who is also one of his coaches.

In 2025, Hagara enrolled into the Faculty of Informatics and Information Technologies at the Slovak University of Technology. That same year, he worked as actor Josef Trojan's stunt double for the Czech-Slovak film Nepela, a biopic about the late Ondrej Nepela.

== Career ==
=== Early years ===
Hagara began learning to skate in 2010. He competed in the advanced novice ranks in the 2018–19 season and early the following season. His junior international debut was in December 2019 at the Santa Claus Cup in Hungary.

In February 2020, Hagara won the Slovak national junior men's title. In March, he competed at the 2020 World Junior Championships and placed 33rd in the short program. He made no international appearances the following season.

=== 2021–22 season ===
Debuting on the ISU Junior Grand Prix series, Hagara placed 13th in Košice, Slovakia, in early September 2021. Later that month, he also made his senior international debut, finishing 23rd at the 2021 Nebelhorn Trophy. He placed ninth at the Budapest Trophy and then won gold at the Tirnavia Ice Cup in Slovakia, bronze at Skate Celje in Slovenia, and bronze at the Santa Claus Cup in Hungary.

In December 2021, Hagara competed as a senior at Four Nationals. He finished third in the short program and fourth overall, but finished as the top Slovak competitor. He was subsequently named to Slovakia's team to the 2022 European Championships in Tallinn, Estonia. He placed 25th at the European Championships in January and 26th at the 2022 World Championships. In April, he qualified to the final segment at the 2022 World Junior Championships, finishing 16th in the short and 21st overall.

=== 2022–23 season ===
Hagara began the season with two assignments on the Junior Grand Prix, finishing seventh at the 2022 JGP France and sixth at the second edition of the 2022 JGP Poland. He also won gold in the junior event at the Sofia Trophy.

Competing as a senior, Hagara had one Challenger assignment, and finished eighth at the 2022 Nepela Memorial. He had a number of other minor senior internationals, including a silver medal at the Santa Claus Cup, before winning a second Slovak national title at the 2023 Four National Championships, an event where he also finished second overall among the men.

In the latter half of the season, Hagara reached the final segment at three ISU Championships. In January, he finished 18th at the 2023 European Championships in Espoo, Finland. In March, he placed 14th at the 2023 World Junior Championships in Calgary, Canada, before traveling to Saitama, Japan, for the 2023 World Championships, where he finished 23rd.

=== 2023–24 season: Youth Olympic Silver, World Junior bronze ===
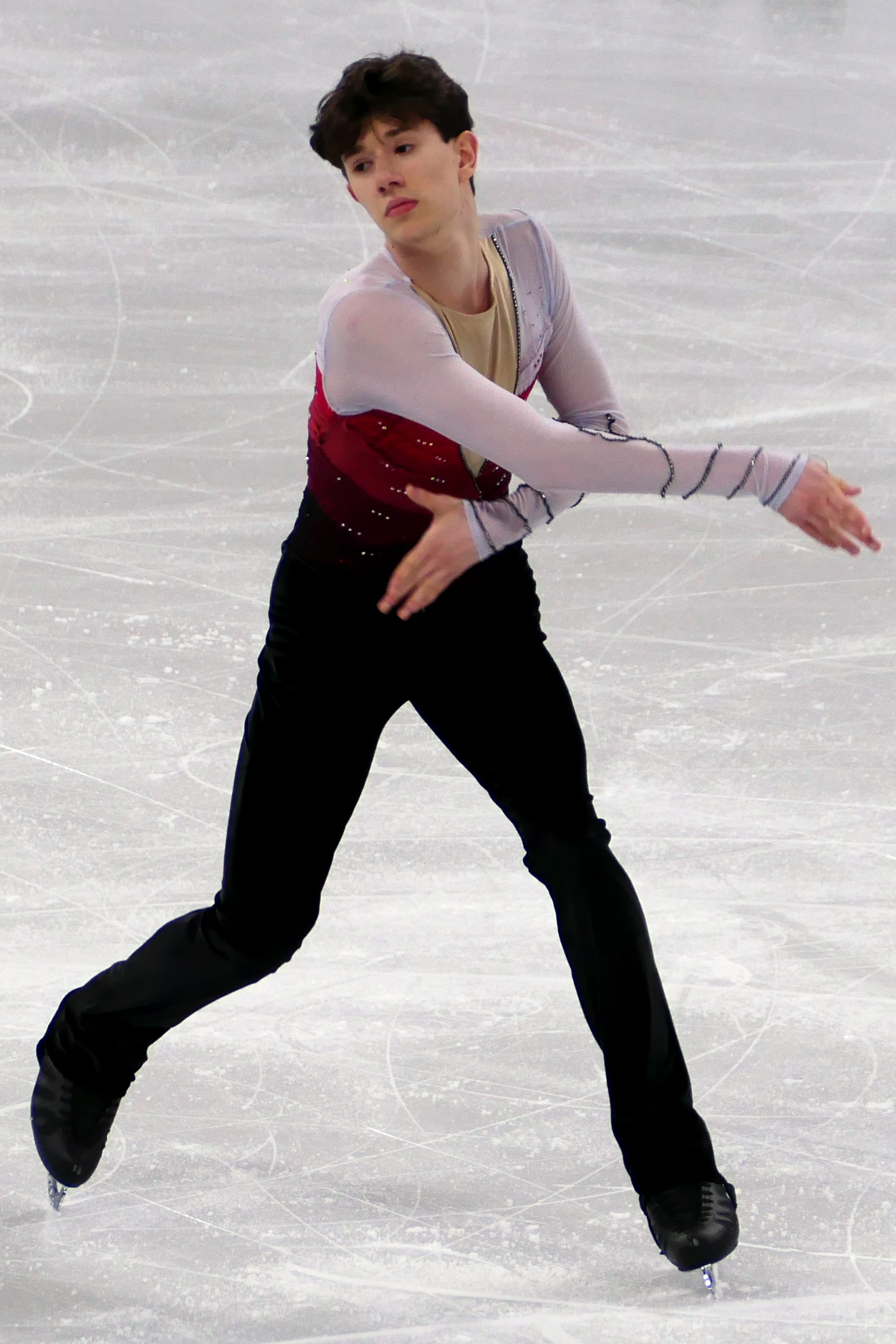
Hagara during the short program at the 2024 World Championships

Beginning the season on the Junior Grand Prix in early September, Hagara stood on a JGP podium for the first time, taking gold at the 2023 JGP Austria. It was Slovakia's first-ever gold medal in any discipline in the JGP series. He finished fourth at his second event, the 2023 JGP Hungary, before finishing fifth at the 2023 Nepela Memorial at the senior level.

Hagara's Junior Grand Prix results qualified him to the Junior Grand Prix Final, another first for a Slovak skater, which he called "a big responsibility." He finished third in both segments, winning the bronze medal, which he celebrated as "my dream." Hagara then competed at the 2024 Four Nationals Championships, finishing first in the men's event and claiming a third Slovak national title in the process.

At the 2024 Winter Youth Olympics, Hagara finished narrowly second in the short program. Third in the free skate, he finished narrowly second overall. His silver was the first figure skating medal for Slovakia at the Youth Olympics, which he said helped his goal of "putting Slovakia on the map, trying to make figure skating in Slovakia a bigger sport than it already is. We have a long history of figure skating but it kind of went forgotten." Hagara identified acquiring a quadruple jump, a Salchow, as the next major step for him.

At the 2024 World Junior Championships in Taipei, Hagara finished third in both segments of the competition and overall, claiming the bronze medal. This was another podium first for a Slovak man at an ISU championship. Hagara ended the season competing at the senior World Championships, where he came thirty-fifth.

=== 2024–25 season: World Junior bronze ===
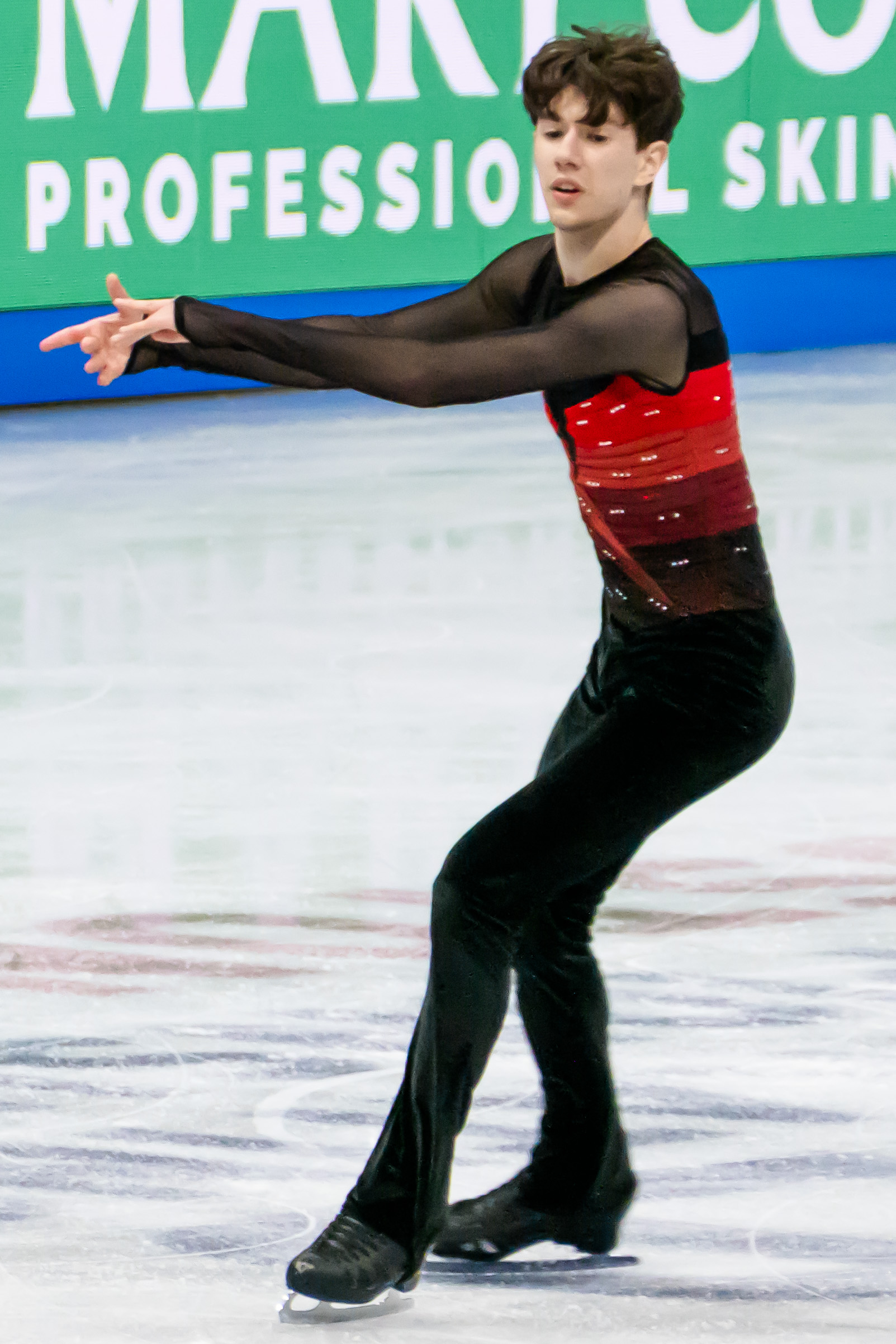
Hagara during the short program at the 2025 World Championships

Beginning the season on the Junior Grand Prix, Hagara won the short program at the JGP Czech Republic, but after finishing fifth in the free skate, he dropped to third overall and claimed the bronze medal. He then went on to take silver at the JGP Slovenia. With these results, Hagara was named as the first alternate for the 2024–25 Junior Grand Prix Final.

Going on to compete as a senior on the 2024–25 ISU Challenger Series, Hagara finished fourth at the 2024 Nepela Memorial. In December, he competed at the 2025 Four National Championships, where he won gold for a second consecutive time. He followed up this result with a gold medal win at the 2025 Sofia Trophy.

In late January, Hagara competed at the 2025 European Championships in Tallinn, Estonia, where he finished in eleventh place. The following month, he competed at the 2025 World Junior Championships in Debrecen, Hungary despite feeling ill. He placed fifth in the short program, less than 2 points out of third place. During the free skate, Hagara skated a clean program, placing third in the segment and scoring a new personal best. This allowed him to climb up to the bronze medal position for a second consecutive time.

In an interview following the event, he said, "I am so happy! I don’t know how I did it, but I did it. I can’t breathe right now anymore. It was definitely hard. My illness comes and goes, but I could definitely feel it during the skate, I just tried not to show it. I’m super happy with how it went. I did my job, and I’m so glad. Now, I will concentrate on Senior Worlds and my upcoming exams. I’ll see how that goes. I really hope to gain the Olympic spot. I’m also happy with the score, finally, I got over 150 in an ISU competition!"

At the senior 2025 World Championships, held in Boston in March, Hagara placed eighteenth in the short program and climbed to sixteenth place after the free skate. He considered attempting a quadruple toe loop jump, which he had been performing in his free skate in training, but decided not to. His performance won Slovakia a quota at the 2026 Winter Olympics for the second time since the Dissolution of Czechoslovakia in 1992, after Róbert Kažimír competed at the 1998 Winter Olympics.

=== 2025–26 season: Milano Cortina Olympics ===
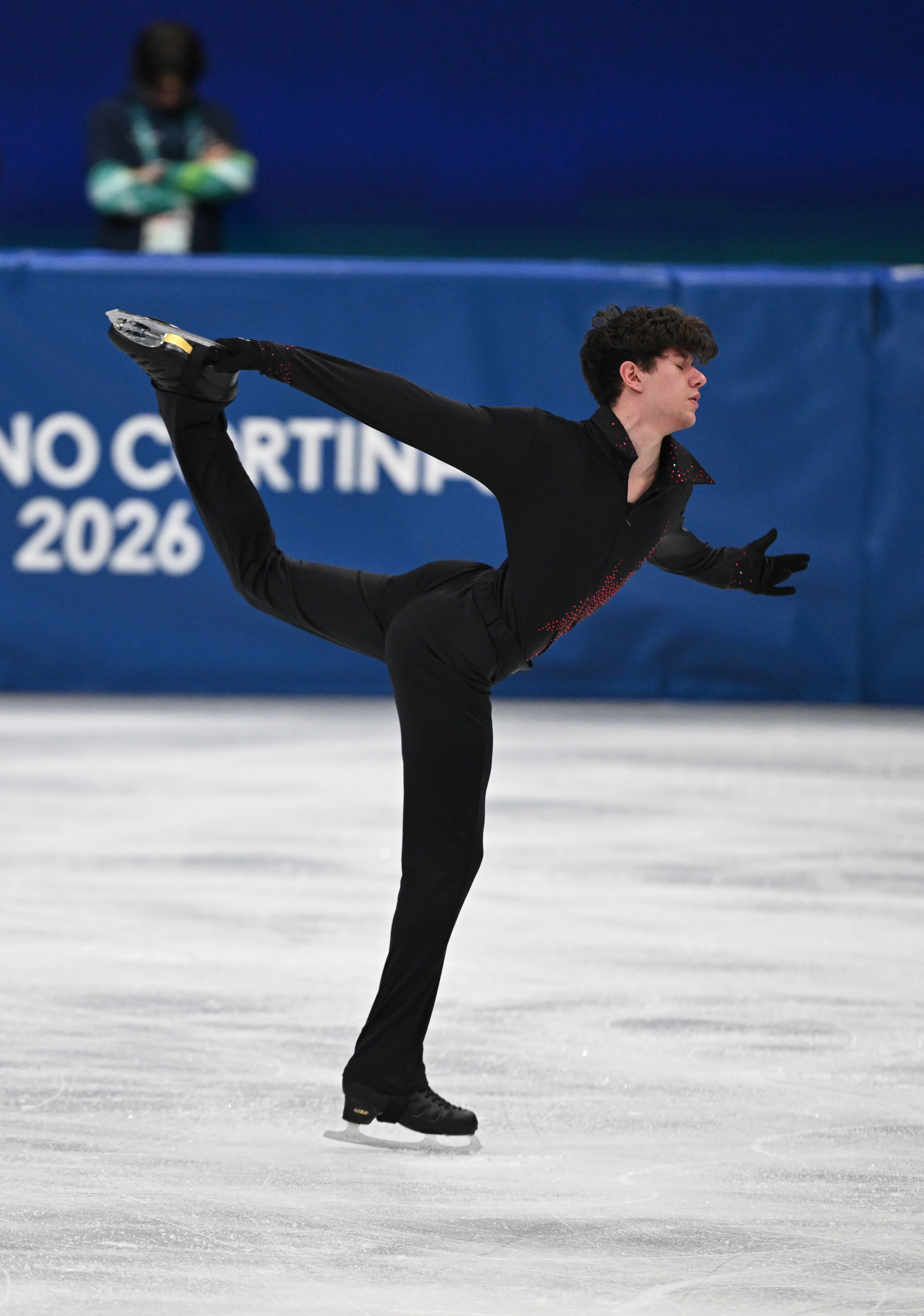
Hagara at the 2026 Winter Olympics

Hagara opened his season by competing on the 2025–26 ISU Challenger Series, finishing fifth at the 2025 CS Nepela Memorial and eleventh at the 2025 CS Trialeti Trophy. At the former event, he became the first Slovak skater to land a clean quadruple jump in an ISU competition.

He then went on to make his senior Grand Prix debut at the 2025 NHK Trophy, where he placed sixth overall. In December, he won his third consecutive national title at the 2026 Four National Championships. The following month, he competed at the 2026 European Championships in Sheffield, England, United Kingdom, where he placed fourteenth in the short program and fourth in the free skate to finish in tenth place overall.

On 10 February, Hagara competed in the short program segment of the 2026 Winter Olympics, placing twentieth. Two days later, he placed twenty-fourth in the free skate to finish in twenty-fourth place overall.

In March, Hagara completed his season at the 2026 World Championships. He placed eighteenth in the short program and fourteenth in the free skate, finishing fifteenth overall, setting a new season's best total score of 230.29 points.

=== 2026–27 season ===
Hagara opened the new season at the 2026 CS Nepela Memorial finishing in sixth place overall. Following this, Hagara competed at the 2026 Grand Prix de France. He placed twelfth in the short program, then subsequently withdrew from the event due to medical reasons.

== Programs ==
Season	Short program	Free skate	Exhibition	Ref.
2019–20	Legendary By Welshly Arms	Feeling Good By Michael Bublé	—N/a	
2020–21	Roads Untraveled By Linkin Park	Feeling Good By Michael Bublé	—N/a	
2021–22	Roads Untraveled By Linkin Park	Feeling Good By Michael Bublé	—N/a	
2022–23	Freedom By Pharrell Williams Choreo. by Matěj Novák	Dream On By Aerosmith Choreo. by Libor Hlaváček	—N/a	
2023–24	Another Love By Tom Odell Choreo. by Jorik Hendrickx	Dream On By Aerosmith Choreo. by Libor Hlaváček	Roads Untraveled	
2024–25	Another Love By Tom Odell Choreo. by Jorik Hendrickx	James Bond; James Bond 007 Theme By John Barry Performed by Well F. Silva Music; Rhapsody on Bond, James Bond By Charles Szczepanek Choreo. by Libor Hlaváček		
2025–26	When I Was Your Man; Runaway Baby By Bruno Mars Choreo. by Jorik Hendrickx; Another Love	James Bond; James Bond 007 Theme By John Barry Performed by Well F. Silva Music; Rhapsody on Bond, James Bond By Charles Szczepanek Choreo. by Libor Hlaváček	Roads Untraveled	

== Competitive highlights ==
- GP – Event of the ISU Grand Prix Series
- CS – Event of the ISU Challenger Series
- JGP – Event of the ISU Junior Grand Prix Series
- TBD – Assigned
- WD – Withdrew from competition

Competition placements at senior level
Season	2021–22	2022–23	2023–24	2024–25	2025–26	2026-27
Winter Olympics					24th	
World Championships	26th	23rd	35th	16th	15th	
European Championships	25th	18th	11th	12th	10th	
Slovak Championships	1st	1st	1st	1st	1st	
Four Nationals Championships	4th	2nd	1st	1st	1st	
GP France						WD
GP NHK Trophy					6th	
CS Nebelhorn Trophy	23rd					
CS Nepela Memorial		8th	5th	4th	5th	6th
CS Trialeti Trophy					11th	
CS Warsaw Cup			8th			
Bellu Memorial	4th					
Budapest Trophy	9th					
Santa Claus Cup	3rd	2nd				
Skate Celje	3rd	1st				
Skate Helena	1st					
Sofia Trophy				1st		
Tirnavia Ice Cup	1st	1st	2nd			TBD

Competition placements at junior level
Season	2019–20	2021–22	2022–23	2023–24	2024–25
Winter Youth Olympics				2nd	
World Junior Championships	33rd	21st	14th	3rd	3rd
Junior Grand Prix Final				3rd	
Slovak Championships	1st				
JGP Austria				1st	
JGP Czech Republic					3rd
JGP France			7th		
JGP Hungary				4th	
JGP Poland			6th		
JGP Slovakia		13th			
JGP Slovenia					2nd
Dragon Trophy	2nd				
Grand Prix of Bratislava	2nd				
Santa Claus Cup	6th				
Skate Helena	3rd				
Sofia Trophy			1st		

== Detailed results ==
ISU personal best scores in the +5/-5 GOE System
Segment	Type	Score	Event
Total	TSS	233.93	2025 World Junior Championships
Short program	TSS	80.90	2024 JGP Slovenia
Short program	TES	45.23	2024 JGP Slovenia
Short program	PCS	36.93	2025 World Championships
Free skating	TSS	157.48	2025 NHK Trophy
Free skating	TES	83.98	2026 European Championships
Free skating	PCS	74.43	2025 World Junior Championships

=== Senior level ===
Results in the 2021–22 season
Date	Event	SP		FS		Total	
Date	Event	P	Score	P	Score	P	Score
Sep 22–25, 2021	(Germany) 2021 CS Nebelhorn Trophy	25	54.20	19	108.21	23	162.41
Oct 14–17, 2021	(Hungary) 2021 Budapest Trophy	8	60.26	9	103.35	9	163.61
Oct 28–31, 2021	(Slovakia) 2021 Tirnavia Ice Cup	1	65.58	1	123.89	1	189.47
Nov 19–21, 2021	(Slovenia) 2021 Skate Celje	4	57.90	3	111.63	3	169.53
Dec 6–12, 2021	(Hungary) 2021 Santa Claus Cup	2	68.73	3	125.87	3	194.60
Dec 16–18, 2021	(Slovakia) 2022 Four Nationals Championships	3	62.89	4	118.02	4	180.91
Dec 16–18, 2021	(Slovakia) 2022 Slovak Championships (Note: The Slovak Championships are contested as part of the Four Nationals Championships.)	1	—N/a	1	—N/a	1	—N/a
Jan 10–16, 2022	(Estonia) 2022 European Championships	25	65.23	–	–	25	65.23
Jan 19–23, 2022	(Serbia) 2022 Skate Helena	1	72.15	1	137.95	1	210.10
Feb 23–26, 2022	(Romania) 2022 Bellu Memorial	4	74.54	4	133.77	4	208.31
Mar 21–27, 2022	(France) 2022 World Championships	26	60.92	—N/a	—N/a	26	60.92

Results in the 2022–23 season
Date	Event	SP		FS		Total	
Date	Event	P	Score	P	Score	P	Score
Sep 29 – Oct 1, 2022	(Slovakia) 2022 CS Nepela Memorial	10	60.30	8	122.65	8	182.95
Oct 28–30, 2022	(Slovakia) 2022 Tirnavia Ice Cup	1	57.02	1	128.60	1	185.62
Nov 17–20, 2022	(Slovenia) 2022 Skate Celje	1	69.23	1	138.35	1	207.58
Nov 28 – Dec 4, 2022	(Hungary) 2022 Santa Claus Cup	4	67.81	2	132.47	2	200.28
Dec 15–17, 2022	(Hungary) 2023 Four Nationals Championships	2	67.99	1	137.03	2	205.02
Dec 15–17, 2022	(Hungary) 2023 Slovak Championships	1	—N/a	1	—N/a	1	—N/a
Jan 25–29, 2023	(Finland) 2023 European Championships	21	65.15	15	124.57	18	189.72
Mar 22–26, 2023	(Japan) 2023 World Championships	24	70.29	22	132.97	23	203.26

Results in the 2023–24 season
Date	Event	SP		FS		Total	
Date	Event	P	Score	P	Score	P	Score
Sep 28–30, 2023	(Slovakia) 2023 CS Nepela Memorial	9	74.27	5	148.51	5	222.78
Oct 27–29, 2023	(Slovakia) 2023 Tirnavia Ice Cup	4	59.86	1	140.38	2	200.24
Nov 15–17, 2023	(Poland) 2023 CS Warsaw Cup	12	66.90	4	138.63	8	205.53
Dec 14–16, 2023	(Czech Republic) 2024 Four Nationals Championships	1	73.88	1	135.05	1	208.93
Dec 14–16, 2023	(Czech Republic) 2024 Slovak Championships	1	—N/a	1	—N/a	1	—N/a
Jan 10–14, 2024	(Lithuania) 2024 European Championships	11	74.97	11	145.85	11	220.82
Mar 18–24, 2024	(Canada) 2024 World Championships	35	65.37	—N/a	—N/a	35	65.37

Results in the 2024–25 season
Date	Event	SP		FS		Total	
Date	Event	P	Score	P	Score	P	Score
Oct 25–27, 2024	(Slovakia) 2024 CS Nepela Memorial	2	78.12	4	149.46	4	227.58
Dec 13–14, 2024	(Poland) 2025 Four Nationals Championships	1	78.78	1	162.24	1	241.02
Dec 13–14, 2024	(Poland) 2025 Slovak Championships	1	—N/a	1	—N/a	1	—N/a
Jan 7–12, 2025	(Bulgaria) 2025 Sofia Trophy	1	80.56	1	155.45	1	236.01
Jan 28 – Feb 2, 2025	(Estonia) 2025 European Championships	13	77.06	10	147.08	12	224.14

Results in the 2025–26 season
Date	Event	SP		FS		Total	
Date	Event	P	Score	P	Score	P	Score
Sep 25–27, 2025	(Slovakia) 2025 CS Nepela Memorial	9	71.77	5	151.39	5	223.16
Oct 8–11, 2025	(Georgia (country)) 2025 CS Trialeti Trophy	6	78.94	12	113.52	11	192.46
Nov 7–9, 2025	(Japan) 2025 NHK Trophy	9	72.52	4	157.48	6	230.00
Dec 11–13, 2025	(Poland) 2026 Four Nationals Championships	1	79.58	1	147.12	1	226.70
Dec 11–13, 2025	(Poland) 2025 Slovak Championships	1	—N/a	1	—N/a	1	—N/a
Jan 13–18, 2026	(United Kingdom) 2026 European Championships	14	68.96	4	155.31	10	224.27
Feb 10–13, 2026	(Italy) 2026 Winter Olympics	20	80.30	24	122.08	24	202.38
Mar 24–29, 2026	(Czech Republic) 2026 World Championships	18	76.75	14	153.54	15	230.29

Results in the 2026-27 season
Date	Event	SP		FS		Total	
Date	Event	P	Score	P	Score	P	Score
Sep 24-27, 2026	(Slovakia) 2026 CS Nepela Memorial	6	80.23	6	144.95	6	225.18
Oct 23-25, 2026	2026 Grand Prix de France	12	59.17	WD	—N/a	WD	—N/a

=== Junior level ===
Results in the 2019–20 season
Date	Event	SP		FS		Total	
Date	Event	P	Score	P	Score	P	Score
Dec 2–8, 2019	(Hungary) 2019 Santa Claus Cup	6	34.99	6	65.77	6	100.76
Dec 13–15, 2019	(Slovakia) 2019 Grand Prix of Bratislava	2	46.48	2	83.54	2	130.02
Jan 16–18, 2020	(Serbia) 2020 Skate Helena	3	54.32	3	97.63	3	151.95
Jan 30 – Feb 2, 2020	(Slovenia) 2020 Dragon Trophy	3	43.84	2	91.02	2	134.86
Feb 22–23, 2020	(Slovakia) 2020 Slovak Championships (Junior)	2	45.41	1	83.84	1	129.25
Mar 2–8, 2020	(Estonia) 2020 World Junior Championships	33	41.90	—N/a	—N/a	33	41.90

Results in the 2021–22 season
Date	Event	SP		FS		Total	
Date	Event	P	Score	P	Score	P	Score
Sep 1–4, 2021	2021 JGP Slovakia	11	56.38	11	106.25	13	162.63
Apr 13–17, 2022	(Estonia) 2022 World Junior Championships	16	64.72	22	108.04	21	172.76

Results in the 2022–23 season
Date	Event	SP		FS		Total	
Date	Event	P	Score	P	Score	P	Score
Aug 24–27, 2022	2022 JGP France	8	56.09	5	118.61	7	174.70
Oct 5–8, 2022	2022 JGP Poland II	7	66.42	5	122.85	6	189.27
Feb 3–7, 2023	(Bulgaria) 2022 Sofia Trophy	1	70.88	1	130.91	1	201.79
Feb 27 – Mar 5, 2023	(Canada) 2023 World Junior Championships	13	66.71	14	126.64	14	193.35

Results in the 2023–24 season
Date	Event	SP		FS		Total	
Date	Event	P	Score	P	Score	P	Score
Aug 30 – Sep 2, 2023	2023 JGP Austria	1	74.01	1	146.32	1	220.33
Sep 20–23, 2023	2023 JGP Hungary	1	74.94	5	125.16	4	200.10
Dec 7–10, 2023	(China) 2023–24 Junior Grand Prix Final	3	71.43	3	141.83	3	213.26
Jan 27–29, 2024	(South Korea) 2024 Winter Youth Olympics	2	75.06	3	141.17	2	216.23
Feb 26 – Mar 3, 2024	(Taiwan) 2024 World Junior Championships	3	78.02	3	147.59	3	225.61

Results in the 2024–25 season
Date	Event	SP		FS		Total	
Date	Event	P	Score	P	Score	P	Score
Sep 4–9, 2024	2024 JGP Czech Republic	1	78.03	5	133.20	3	211.23
Oct 2–5, 2024	2024 JGP Slovenia	2	80.90	3	136.53	2	217.43
Feb 25 – Mar 2, 2025	(Hungary) 2025 World Junior Championships	5	80.89	3	153.04	3	233.93
