= Petya Gavazova =

Personal information
- Born: 19 September 1968 (age 57)

Figure skating career
- Country: Bulgaria
- Retired: 1990

Petya Gavazova (Bulgarian: Петя Гавазова; born 19 September 1969 ) is a Bulgarian former competitive figure skater. As a single skater, she represented Bulgaria at two European Championships, three World Championships, and the 1988 Winter Olympics in Calgary. She later partnered with Nikolay Tonev to compete in ice dancing. The duo appeared at two Worlds and one Europeans.

== Competitive highlights ==
=== Single skating ===
Event	1983–84	1984–85	1985–86	1986–87	1987–88
Winter Olympics					28th
World Championships		24th	27th	26th	
European Championships			23rd	21st	
Bulgarian Championships	2nd	1st		1st	

=== Ice dance with Tonev ===
Event	1988–89	1989–90
World Championships	23rd	26th
European Championships		19th
Bulgarian Championships	1st	1st
