= Naiden Borichev =

Bulgarian figure skater

Personal information
- Born: 7 January 1980 (age 46) Sofia, Bulgaria
- Height: 1.77 m (5 ft 9 1/2 in)

Figure skating career
- Country: Bulgaria
- Coach: Naiden Borichev, Evelina Panova
- Skating club: Ice Peak
- Began skating: 1986
- Retired: c. 2008

Naiden Borichev (Bulgarian: Найден Боричев; born 7 January 1980 in Sofia) is a Bulgarian former competitive figure skater. He is the 2003 Ondrej Nepela Memorial champion and a two-time Bulgarian national champion (2007 and 2008). He was coached by Evelina Panova and then coached himself. He also coached his teammate, Hristina Vassileva.

== Programs ==
Season	Short program	Free skating
2007–08	Signal to Noise by Peter Gabriel	Anathema by Balkan Horses
2006–07	Incantation (from Cirque du Soleil)	Kill Bill by various composers

== Results ==
International
Event	97–98	98–99	99–00	00–01	01–02	02–03	03–04	04–05	05–06	06–07	07–08
Worlds										31st	39th
Europeans										30th	31st
Crystal Skate					5th						8th
Cup of Nice											13th
Golden Spin			12th				9th			14th	
Nepela Memorial	12th		16th		13th		1st		20th		9th
Pajovic Cup				1st		2nd					
Universiade		10th									
International: Junior
Junior Worlds		23rd									
JGP Bulgaria	8th	8th									
JGP Slovakia		22nd									
National
Bulgarian Champ.	3rd	3rd	3rd	3rd	3rd	3rd	2nd	2nd		1st	1st
