= Skate Helena =

International figure skating competition

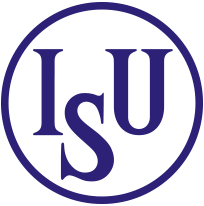
- Location: Serbia

Skate Helena (formerly known as the Helena Pajović Cup) is an international figure skating competition which is generally held in December or January in Belgrade, Serbia. The competition is named in honor of Helena Pajović, a former Serb figure skater who competed internationally for Yugoslavia. Medals may be awarded in men's singles and women's singles at the senior, junior, and novice levels. The event formerly included ice dance.

== Senior results ==
=== Men's singles ===
Year	Gold	Silver	Bronze	Ref.
2001	(Bulgaria) Naiden Borichev	(Uzbekistan) Vladimir Belomoin	No other competitors	
2003	(Serbia and Montenegro) Trifun Živanović	(Bulgaria) Naiden Borichev	No other competitors	
2014	(Philippines) Michael Christian Martinez	No other competitors		
2016	(Finland) Tomi Pulkkinen	(Finland) Roman Galay	(Turkey) Burak Demirboğa	
2017	(Italy) Mattia Dalla Torre	No other competitors		
2019	(Russia) Petr Gumennik	(Hungary) Alexander Maszljanko	No other competitors	
2022	(Slovakia) Adam Hagara	(Hungary) Aleksandr Vlasenko	(Bulgaria) Beat Schümperli	
2024	(Bulgaria) Larry Loupolover	(Chinese Taipei) Guan Ting Zhou	No other competitors	
2025	(Israel) Nico Steffen	(Finland) Makar Suntsev	(Bulgaria) Filip Kaimakchiev	

=== Women's singles ===
Year	Gold	Silver	Bronze	Ref.
2001	(Poland) Sabina Wojtala	(Uzbekistan) Anastasia Gimazetdinova	(Israel) Daria Zuravicki	
2003	(Hungary) Tamara Dorofejev	(Slovenia) Anja Bratec	No other competitors	
2013	(Slovenia) Daša Grm	(Belgium) Isabelle Pieman	No other competitors	
2014	(Finland) Juulia Turkkila	(Finland) Emilia Toikkanen	(Finland) Helena Stenbacka	
2015	(Finland) Viveca Lindfors	(Philippines) Alisson Krystle Perticheto	(Austria) Anita Kapferer	
2016	(Hungary) Fruzsina Medgyesi	(Finland) Liubov Efimenko	(Turkey) Sıla Saygı	
2017	(United Kingdom) Natasha McKay	(United Kingdom) Kristen Spours	(United Kingdom) Karly Robertson	
2018	(Czech Republic) Eliska Brezinova	(Austria) Kerstin Frank	(Slovakia) Nina Letenayova	
2019	(Serbia) Antonina Dubinina	(Italy) Anna Memola	(Austria) Victoria Hübler	
2020	(Bulgaria) Kristina Grigorova	(Hungary) Júlia Láng	(Lithuania) Elžbieta Kropa	
2021	(Serbia) Antonina Dubinina	(Bulgaria) Kristina Grigorova	(Greece) Dimitra Korri	
2022	(Slovenia) Daša Grm	(Hungary) Júlia Láng	(Romania) Julia Sauter	
2023	(Bulgaria) Kristina Grigorova	(Serbia) Antonina Dubinina	(Croatia) Hana Cvijanović	
2024	(Israel) Elizabet Gervitz	(Moldova) Anastasia Gracheva	(Croatia) Hana Cvijanović	
2025	(Moldova) Anastasia Gracheva	(Switzerland) Ophélie Clerc	(Latvia) Sofja Stepčenko	

=== Ice dance ===
Year	Gold	Silver	Bronze	Ref.
2001	(Israel); Natalia Gudina; Alexei Beletski	(Poland); Agnieszka Dulej; Sławomir Janicki	(Russia); Anna Markina; Dmitri Nigirish	

== Junior results ==
=== Men's singles ===
Year	Gold	Silver	Bronze	Ref.
2001	(Poland) Maciej Kuś	(Slovenia) Urban Kalšek	(Bulgaria) Yavor Boyanov	
2002	No competition held			
2003	(Norway) Michael Chrolenko	(Bulgaria) Leri Kenchadze	(Bulgaria) Georgi Kenchadze	
2008	No junior men's competitors			
2009	(Bosnia and Herzegovina) Amel Bureković	No other competitors		
2010	(Croatia) Ivor Mikolčević	No other competitors		
2011	(Croatia) Mislav Blagojević	No other competitors		
2012	(Slovenia) Krištof Brezar	No other competitors		
2013	(Malaysia) Julian Zhi Jie Yee	(Slovenia) Krištof Brezar	(Austria) Manuel Drechsler	
2014	(Slovenia) Krištof Brezar	(Croatia) Steven Baker	(Croatia) Tomislav Mikulandrić	
2015	(Russia) Andrei Zuber	(Czech Republic) Jiří Bělohradský	(Italy) Simone Cervi	
2016	(Turkey) Başar Oktar	(Austria) Luc Maierhofer	(France) Landry Le May	
2017	(Bulgaria) Alexander Zlatkov	(Bulgaria) Nikola Zlatanov	(Austria) Johannes Maierhofer	
2018	(Bulgaria) Vassil Dimitrov	(Bulgaria) Nikola Zlatanov	(Italy) Guido Alberto Offsass	
2019	(Russia) Mikhail Polianskii	(Russia) Mark Kondratiuk	(Bulgaria) Radoslav Marinov	
2020	(Georgia (country)) Nika Egadze	(Russia) Grigoriy Fedorov	(Slovakia) Adam Hagara	
2021	(Slovenia) David Sedej	(Bulgaria) Filip Kaymakchiev	No other competitors	
2022	(Turkey) Ali Efe Gunes	(Turkey) Alp Eren Ozkan	(Slovenia) David Sedej	
2023	(Turkey) Mehmet Cenkay Karlıklı	(Austria) Daniel Ruis	No other competitors	
2024	(Turkey) Ali Efe Gunes	(Hong Kong) Chiu Hei Cheung	(Bulgaria) Deyan Mihaylov	
2025	(Switzerland) Gion Schmid	(United Kingdom) Arin Yorke	(Armenia) Mikayel Salazaryan	

=== Women's singles ===
Year	Gold	Silver	Bronze	Ref.
2001	(Russia) Polina Igoseva	(Slovenia) Darja Škrlj	(Slovenia) Nena Stojanović	
2002	No competition held			
2003	(Bulgaria) Sonia Radeva	(Japan) Miri Yoshida	(Finland) Henriikka Hietaniemi	
2008	(Italy) Valentina Bonafede	(Finland) Annika Nyman	(Finland) Marianne Pirskanen	
2009	(Slovenia) Patricia Gleščič	(Croatia) Ema Lipovšćak	(Slovenia) Alja Stefelin	
2010	(Slovenia) Daša Grm	(Slovenia) Pina Umek	(Croatia) Mateja Bursić	
2011	(Serbia) Katarina Knežević	(Croatia) Petra Jurić	(Croatia) Nika Žafran	
2012	(Sweden) Rebecka Emanuelsson	(Sweden) Elin Hallberg	(Belgium) Eline Anthonissen	
2013	(Serbia) Sandra Ristivojević	(Slovenia) Pina Umek	(Netherlands) Kim Bell	
2014	(Finland) Viveca Lindfors	(South Africa) Michaela du Toit	(Philippines) Frances Clare Untalan	
2015	(Slovenia) Monika Peterka	(Italy) Chiara Calderone	(Estonia) Natalja Gordejeva	
2016	(Slovakia) Alexandra Hagarová	(Finland) Joanna Kallela	(Finland) Petra Laakkonen	
2017	(Bulgaria) Alexandra Feigin	(Switzerland) Shaline Rüegger	(Slovakia) Alexandra Hagarová	
2018	(Italy) Lucrezia Beccari	(Hungary) Dora Nagy	(Croatia) Hana Cvijanović	
2019	(Georgia (country)) Alina Urushadze	(Hungary) Júlia Láng	(Italy) Alessia Tornaghi	
2020	(Russia) Sofia Baranova	(Switzerland) Anna La Porta	(Bulgaria) Ivelina Baycheva	
2021	(Belgium) Nina Pinzarrone	(Belgium) Jade Hovine	(Slovenia) Manca Krmelj	
2022	(Slovenia) Julija Lovrencic	(Mexico) Andrea Astrain Maynez	(Turkey) Anna Deniz Ozdemir	
2023	(Slovakia) Olívia Lengyelová	(Slovenia) Zoja Kramar	(Czech Republic) Adéla Vallová	
2024	(Slovakia) Olívia Lengyelová	(Cyprus) Stefania Yakovleva	(Italy) Chiara Minighini	
2025	(France) Stefania Gladki	(Slovakia) Olívia Lengyelová	(Slovakia) Alicia Lengyelová	

=== Ice dance ===
Year	Gold	Silver	Bronze	Ref.
2001	(Poland); Marta Dzióbek; Michał Zych	(Russia); Ksenia Shmirina; Alexander Baidukov	(Poland); Agata Rosłońska; Michał Tomaszewski	
2003	(Russia); Aleksandra Volchek; Pavel Filchenkov	No other competitors		
