= Georgi Kenchadze =

Bulgarian figure skater

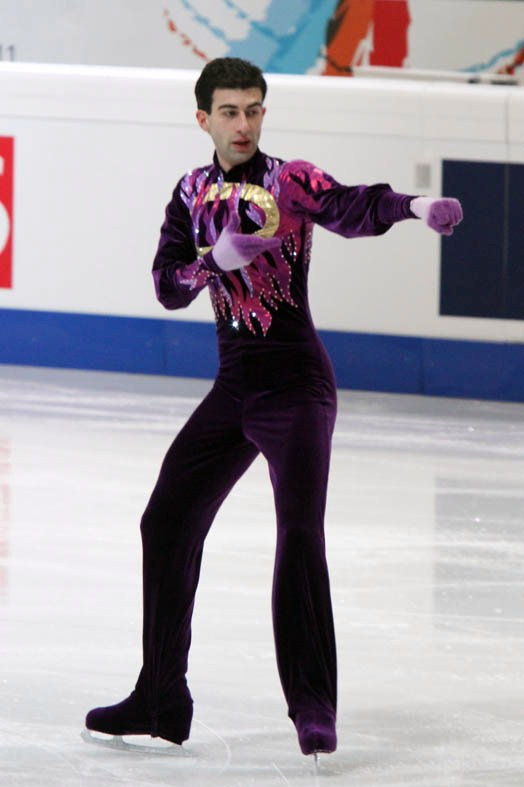

Personal information
- Full name: Georgi Kenchadze
- Born: August 16, 1986 (age 40) Tbilisi, Georgia
- Home town: Sofia, Bulgaria
- Height: 1.88 m (6 ft 2 in)

Figure skating career
- Country: Bulgaria
- Partner: Sarah May Coward
- Coach: Naiden Borichev
- Skating club: Dance on Ice - Denkova-Staviski

Georgi Kenchadze (born August 16, 1986, in Tbilisi, Georgia) is a Bulgarian former figure skater of Georgian descent. He is the 2006 & 2007 Bulgarian national silver medalist and the 2005 national bronze medalist. He is a two-time competitor at the World Junior Championships. His twin brother, Leri Kenchadze, has competed in pair skating. George now competes for Bulgaria with his partner Sarah May Coward. They are the current Bulgarian National Ice Dance Champions.

== Results ==
Event	02–03	03–04	04–05	05–06	06–07	07–08	08–09	09–10	10–11
World Championships							45th	40th	42nd
European Championships							30th	36th	37th
Bulgarian Championships	5th		3rd	2nd	2nd		1st	1st	
Coupe Internationale de Nice									21st
Crystal Skate of Romania				10th			9th		
Ondrej Nepela Memorial							20th		
Merano Cup									13th
