= Yavor Ivanov (figure skater) =

Bulgarian ice dancer (1964–2022)

Personal information
- Nationality: Bulgarian
- Born: 22 April 1964; Sofia, Bulgaria
- Died: 19 December 2022 (aged 58)

Sport
- Sport: Figure skating

Yavor Ivanov (Bulgarian: Явор Иванов; 22 April 1964 – 19 December 2022) was a Bulgarian ice dancer. He competed in the ice dance event at the 1984 Winter Olympics. He died on 19 December 2022.
