= Sofia Trophy =

International figure skating competition

- Location: Bulgaria

The Sofia Trophy is an international figure skating competition held in Sofia, Bulgaria. Medals may be awarded in men's singles and women's singles at the senior, junior, and novice levels.

== Senior results ==
=== Men's singles ===
Year	Gold	Silver	Bronze	Ref.
2016	(Armenia) Slavik Hayrapetyan	(Finland) Matthias Versluis	(Belarus) Aliaksei Mialiokhin	
2017	(United Kingdom) Harry Mattick	(Switzerland) Lukas Britschgi	(Armenia) Slavik Hayrapetyan	
2018	(Italy) Maurizio Zandron	(Italy) Mattia Dalla Torre	(Italy) Marco Zandron	
2019	(Russia) Egor Murashov	(Italy) Mattia Dalla Torre	(Slovakia) Michael Neuman	
2020	(Bulgaria) Larry Loupolover	(Turkey) Burak Demirboğa	(Austria) Maurizio Zandron	
2021	(Bulgaria) Larry Loupolover	(Monaco) Davide Lewton Brain	(Kazakhstan) Mikhail Shaidorov	
2022	(Austria) Maurizio Zandron	(Monaco) Davide Lewton Brain	(Kazakhstan) Dias Jirenbayev	
2023	(Bulgaria) Alexander Zlatkov	(Italy) Raffaele Francesco Zich	(Bulgaria) Beat Schümperli	
2024	(Bulgaria) Alexander Zlatkov	(Turkey) Burak Demirboga	(France) Ian Vauclin	
2025	(Slovakia) Adam Hagara	(China) Peng Zhiming	(Bulgaria) Alexander Zlatkov	
2026	(Italy) Corey Circelli	(Chinese Taipei) Li Yu-Hsiang	(Bulgaria) Alexander Zlatkov	

=== Women's singles ===
Year	Gold	Silver	Bronze	Ref.
2016	(Sweden) Joshi Helgesson	(Estonia) Johanna Allik	(Italy) Giada Russo	
2017	(Brazil) Isadora Williams	(Sweden) Anita Östlund	(Italy) Micol Cristini	
2018	(Italy) Micol Cristini	(Italy) Elisabetta Leccardi	(Singapore) Chloe Ing	
2019	(Bulgaria) Alexandra Feigin	(Italy) Lucrezia Gennaro	(Italy) Sara Conti	
2020	(Bulgaria) Alexandra Feigin	(Italy) Lucrezia Beccari	(Slovenia) Daša Grm	
2021	(Austria) Olga Mikutina	(Bulgaria) Alexandra Feigin	(Sweden) Anita Östlund	
2022	(Austria) Stefanie Pesendorfer	(Bulgaria) Alexandra Feigin	(Latvia) Angelīna Kučvaļska	
2023	(Bulgaria) Alexandra Feigin	(Bulgaria) Kristina Grigorova	(Italy) Elena Agostinelli	
2024	(Slovenia) Julija Lovrencic	(Spain) Emilia Murdock	(Austria) Emily Saari	
2025	(Bulgaria) Alexandra Feigin	(United Kingdom) Kristen Spours	(Romania) Julia Sauter	
2026	(Czech Republic) Barbora Vránková	(Finland) Olivia Lisko	(Switzerland) Sara Franzi	

=== Ice dance ===
Year	Gold	Silver	Bronze	Ref.
2025	(France); Loïcia Demougeot; Théo le Mercier	(Italy); Victoria Manni; Carlo Röthlisberger	(France); Marie Dupayage; Thomas Nabais	
2026	(Spain); Sofía Val; Asaf Kazimov	(Ukraine); Mariia Pinchuk; Mykyta Pogorielov	(Azerbaijan); Samantha Ritter; Daniel Brykalov	

== Junior results ==
=== Men's singles ===
Year	Gold	Silver	Bronze	Ref.
2016	(Turkey) Başar Oktar	(Sweden) Nikolaj Majorov	(Kazakhstan) Daniyar Adylov	
2017	(Russia) Alexander Petrov	(France) Maxence Collet	(France) Xavier Vauclin	
2018	(Latvia) Kims Georgs Pavlovs	(Bulgaria) Alexander Zlatkov	(Singapore) Chadwick Wang	
2019	(Bulgaria) Radoslav Marinov	(Bulgaria) Alexander Zlatkov	(Russia) Ilia Skirda	
2020	(Turkey) Başar Oktar	(Italy) Nikolaj Memola	(Italy) Matteo Nalbone	
2021	(Turkey) Alp Eren Ozkan	(Turkey) Ali Efe Gunes	(Slovakia) Lukás Václavík	
2022	(Turkey) Alp Eren Ozkan	(Chinese Taipei) Li Yu-Hsiang	(Georgia (country)) Konstantin Supatshvili	
2023	(Slovakia) Adam Hagara	(Slovakia) Lukás Václavík	(Slovakia) Tadeáš Václavík	
2024	(Bulgaria) Deyan Mihaylov	(Spain) André Zapata	(Bulgaria) Yoanis Apostolu	
2025	(Czech Republic) Jakub Tykal	(Austria) Tobia Oellerer	(Czech Republic) Tadeáš Václavík	
2026	(United Kingdom) Arin Yorke	(Bulgaria) Deyan Mihaylov	(Norway) Daniil Valanov	

=== Women's singles ===
Year	Gold	Silver	Bronze	Ref.
2016	(Sweden) Cassandra Johansson	(Italy) Marta Castagno	(Bulgaria) Teodora Markova	
2017	(Russia) Daria Panenkova	(Bulgaria) Alexandra Feigin	(France) Julie Froetscher	
2018	(Bulgaria) Alexandra Feigin	(Italy) Alessia Tornaghi	(Chinese Taipei) Amy Lin	
2019	(Italy) Alessia Tornaghi	(Bulgaria) Maria Levushkina	(China) Zhu Yi	
2020	(Bulgaria) Maria Levushkina	(Bulgaria) Maria Manova	(Bulgaria) Kristina Grigorova	
2021	(Belgium) Nina Pinzarrone	(Switzerland) Kimmy Repond	(Kazakhstan) Mariya Grechanaya	
2022	(Latvia) Nikola Fomcenkova	(Bulgaria) Chiara Hristova	(Belarus) Anastasiya Balyinka	
2023	(Slovakia) Vanesa Šelmeková	(Slovakia) Olivia Lengyelova	(Italy) Giulia Barucchi	
2024	(Switzerland) Eugenia Sekulovski	(Bulgaria) Lia Lyubenova	(Slovenia) Zoja Kramar	
2025	(Slovakia) Olívia Lengyelová	(Slovakia) Alica Lengyelova	(Bulgaria) Lia Lyubenova	
2026	(Slovakia) Olívia Lengyelová	(Slovakia) Alica Lengyelova	(Germany) Anna Gerke	

=== Ice dance ===
Year	Gold	Silver	Bronze	Ref.
2025	(France); Célina Fradji; Jean-Hans Fourneaux	(France); Louise Bordet; Martin Chardain	(Germany); Alexia Kruk; Jan Eisenhaber	
2026	(Ukraine); Iryna Pidgaina; Artem Koval	(Italy); Arianna Soldati; Nicholas Tagliabue	(Czech Republic); Diane Snajder; Jáchym Novák	
