= Khristina Boyanova =

Bulgarian ice dancer

Personal information
- Nationality: Bulgarian
- Born: 11 February 1966 (age 59) Sofia, Bulgaria

Sport
- Sport: Figure skating

Khristina Boyanova (Bulgarian: Христина Боянова) (born 11 February 1966) is a Bulgarian ice dancer. She competed in the ice dance event at the 1984 Winter Olympics.
