= Hristo Turlakov =

Bulgarian figure skater

Personal information
- Born: 20 March 1979 (age 47) Sofia, Bulgaria
- Height: 1.80 m (5 ft 11 in)

Figure skating career
- Country: Bulgaria
- Began skating: 1983
- Retired: 2004

Hristo Turlakov (Bulgarian: Христо Турлаков, born 20 March 1979) is a Bulgarian former competitive figure skater. Competing as a single skater, he appeared at six European Championships. His highest placement was 21st in 2003.

Turlakov also competed as a pair skater on the junior level, placing 19th at the 1998 World Junior Championships with Irina Mladenova, and 23rd at the 1999 World Junior Championships with Anna Dimova.

== Programs ==
Season	Short program	Free skating
2002–2003	Rodrigo by The Planets	Nirvanesave by Nirvana Lounge; Trance by D.J. Jean
2001–2002	Flamenco Guitars by Obo and Jorge; Malaguenia Salerosa by Elpido Ramirez	Nirvanesave by Nirvana Lounge; Trance by D.J. Jean
2000–2001	Flamenco Guitars by Obo and Jorge; Malaguenia Salerosa by Elpido Ramirez	Matrix by various composers

== Results ==
GP = Grand Prix; JGP = Junior Series (Junior Grand Prix)

=== Men's singles ===
International
Event	90–91	91–92	93–94	94–95	95–96	96–97	97–98	98–99	99–00	00–01	01–02	02–03	03–04
Worlds			25th										
Europeans							25th	27th	23rd	29th	27th	21st	
GP Cup of Russia												10th	
GP NHK Trophy												9th	
Crystal Skate										2nd			
Finlandia											14th		
Golden Spin										21st	14th	9th	
Karl Schäfer						14th						7th	
Nebelhorn							13th						
Ondrej Nepela								15th					
International: Junior
Junior Worlds			15th	14th P									
JGP Final							8th						
JGP Bulgaria							4th						
JGP Hungary							2nd						
National
Bulgaria	1st	1st	2nd	2nd	2nd	2nd	2nd	2nd	2nd	2nd	2nd	2nd	3rd
P = Preliminary round

=== Pairs with Mladenova and Dimova ===
International
Event	1998 (Mladenova)	1999 (Dimova)
World Junior Championships	19th	23rd
