= Andrei Lutai =

Russian former competitive figure skater (born 1986)

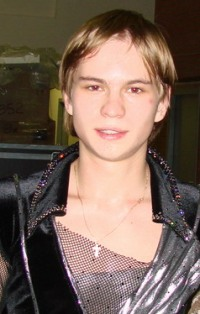
- Andrei Lutai at the 2007 Russian Nationals

Personal information
- Full name: Andrei Vladimirovich Lutai
- Born: 24 July 1986 (age 40) Belgorod, Russian SFSR, Soviet Union
- Height: 1.76 m (5 ft 9 in)

Figure skating career
- Country: Russia

Andrei Vladimirovich Lutai (Russian: Андрей Владимирович Лутай; born 24 July 1986) is a Russian former competitive figure skater. He is the 2006 Karl Schäfer Memorial champion, 2006 International Cup of Nice champion, and a three-time Russian national medalist (2007 & 2008 silver; 2009 bronze). He placed as high as 5th at the European Championships (2007) and 10th at the World Championships (2009).

== Career ==
Lutai began skating in 1992 and was coached by his sister in his early years. After the rink in Belgorod closed, he moved to Samara for one year, and then to Saint Petersburg in 2001 after his sister asked Alexei Mishin to take him in his group. In summer 2005, he broke his foot which continued to bother him in later years. In August 2009, Mishin said that Lutai was very polite and responsible and that his host families spoke highly of him.

In November 2009, following his 10th-place finish at the 2009 Skate America, Lutai was arrested in Lake Placid, New York, and charged with third degree grand larceny and third degree criminal possession of stolen property, both felonies; and third degree unauthorized use of a vehicle and aggravated driving while intoxicated, which are misdemeanors. At a hearing on November 18, Lutai, who had no criminal history, pleaded not guilty to all charges. He was handed a one-year ban by Russia's figure skating governing body which meant he could not compete for a place on the Russian team at the 2010 Winter Olympics. In September 2011, Lutai pleaded guilty to reckless driving and was sentenced to time served.

In early 2010, Lutai became a coach at Albena Denkova / Maxim Staviski's skating club in Sofia, Bulgaria. He now coaches alongside his wife, Ina. Among his students include Georgi Kenchadze, Alexandra Feigin, and Chiara Hristova.

== Personal life ==
Lutai was born on 24 July 1986 in Belgorod, Russian SFSR. The youngest of three children, he has a sister, Elena Malakhova, a skating coach who is 15 years older, and a brother, Alexander, a manager in a firm who is 9 years older.

In April 2010, Lutai married Bulgarian ice dancer Ina Demireva, sister of World champion Albena Denkova, in Sofia, Bulgaria. Their daughter, Silvia (b. 20 September 2010), is a competitive ice dancer.

== Programs ==
Season	Short program	Free skating
2009–10	Carmina Burana by Carl Orff	Peer Gynt by Edvard Grieg; Allegretto
2008–09	Symphony No. 9 "From the New World" by Antonín Dvořák	Headhunters (Latin medley)
2007–08	The Truman Show	New Romantic by Berlinder; Tosca by Giacomo Puccini
2006–07	To Be by Saint-Preux	The Four Seasons by Antonio Vivaldi (modern arrangement)
2004–05	Computer Virus by Boris Blanck	Sea by Didulya

== Results ==
GP: Grand Prix; JGP: Junior Grand Prix

International
Event	02–03	03–04	04–05	05–06	06–07	07–08	08–09	09–10
Worlds					20th		10th	
Europeans					5th	8th	7th	
GP Bompard							11th	
GP Cup of Russia						9th		
GP NHK Trophy							9th	
GP Skate America						7th		10th
Finlandia			10th		4th		8th	
Karl Schäfer					1st			
Cup of Nice					1st			
Universiade			5th					
International: Junior
JGP France			2nd					
JGP Germany	5th							
JGP Italy	4th							
JGP Slovakia		7th						
JGP Ukraine			4th					
National
Russian Champ.	8th	4th	7th	7th	2nd	2nd	3rd	
Russian Junior	3rd			4th				
