= Crystal Skate of Romania =

Annual figure skating competition

- Status: Active
- Genre: International competition
- Frequency: Annual
- Countries: Romania
- Inaugurated: 1999
- Organizer: Romanian Skating Federation

The Crystal Skate of Romania is an annual figure skating competition organized by the Romanian Skating Federation (Romanian: Federatia romana de patinaj). The inaugural competition took place in January 2000 in Miercurea Ciuc and featured skaters from Estonia, the Netherlands, and Switzerland, as well as Romania. Since 2000, the Romanian Figure Skating Championships have occasionally been held in conjunction with the Crystal Skate of Romania. The top Romanian competitors are recognized as the Romanian national champions. Beginning in 2011, events for junior-level men and women were added.

Medals are awarded in men's and women's singles at the senior and junior levels, although each discipline may not necessarily be held every year due to a lack of participants. Gheorghe Chiper of Romania holds the record for winning the most Crystal Skate titles in men's singles (with five), while Roxana Luca and Julia Sauter, also of Romania, are tied for winning the most Crystal Skate titles in women's singles (with three each).

== Senior results ==
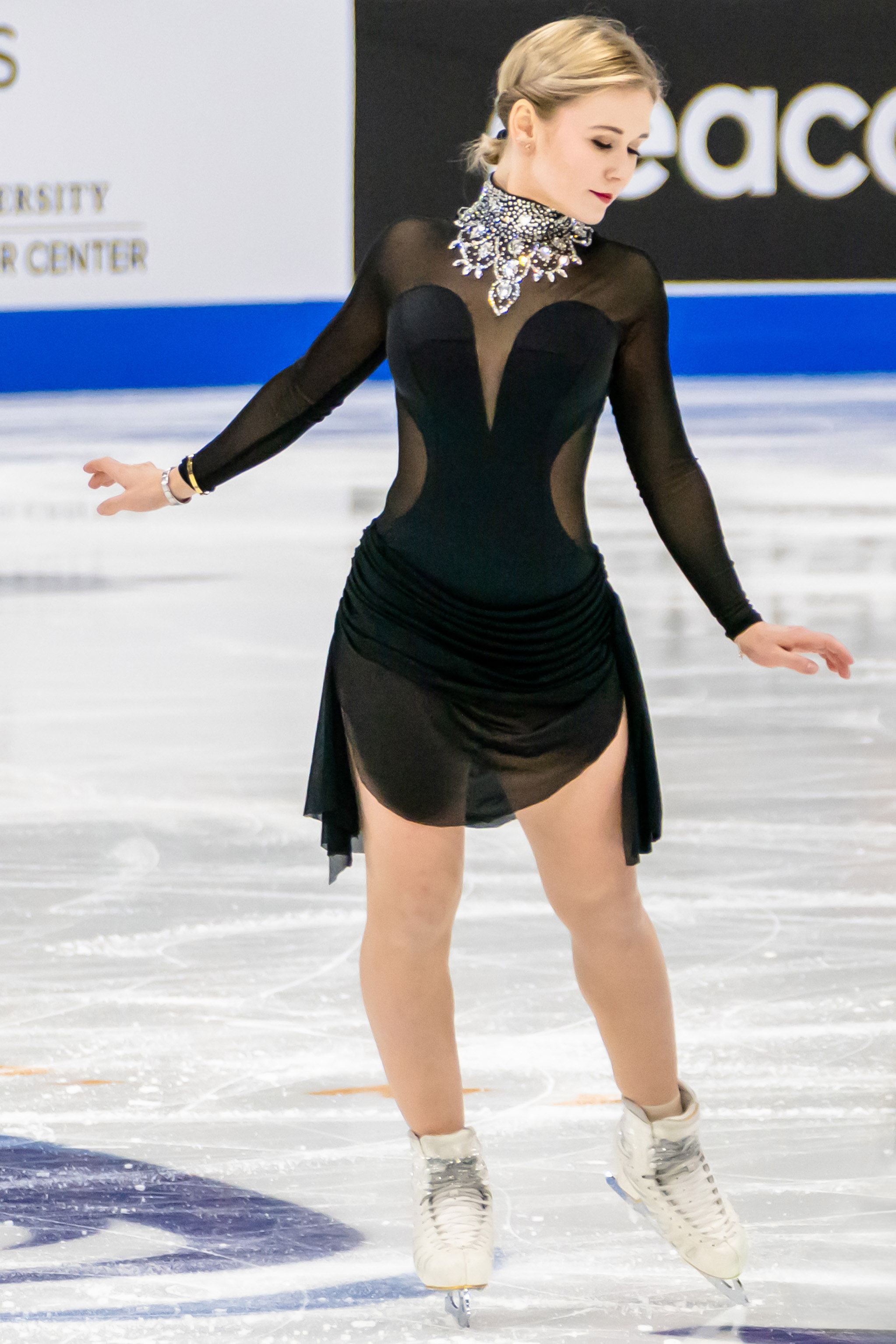
The 2027 Crystal Skate of Romania champions (from left to right): Luc Economides of Romania (men's singles) and Ekaterina Kurakova of Poland (women's singles)

=== Men's singles ===
Senior men's event medalists
Season	Location	Gold	Silver	Bronze	Ref.
1999–2000	Miercurea-Ciuc	(Estonia) Alexei Kozlov	(Romania) Gheorghe Chiper	(Romania) Cornel Gheorghe	
2000–01	Bucharest	(Romania) Gheorghe Chiper	(Bulgaria) Hristo Turlakov	(Romania) Balint Miklos	
2001–02	Bucharest	(Romania) Gheorghe Chiper	(France) Thierry Cerez	(Ukraine) Oleksandr Smokvin	
2002–03	Bucharest	(Romania) Gheorghe Chiper	(Hungary) Zoltán Tóth	(Switzerland) Patrick Meier	
2003–04	Miercurea-Ciuc	(Ukraine) Anton Kovalevski	(Hungary) Zoltán Tóth	(Finland) Mikko Minkkinen	
2004–05	Bucharest	(Romania) Gheorghe Chiper	(Ukraine) Anton Kovalevski	(Slovenia) Gregor Urbas	
2005–06	Bucharest	(Romania) Gheorghe Chiper	(Russia) Alexander Shubin	(France) Samuel Contesti	
2006–07	No competition held				
2007–08	Galați	(France) Yoann Deslot	(France) Mark Vaillant	(Ukraine) Alexei Bychenko	
2008–09	Galați	(Poland) Przemysław Domański	(Ukraine) Alexei Bychenko	(France) Mark Vaillant	
2009–10	Galați	(Sweden) Kristoffer Berntsson	(Sweden) Adrian Schultheiss	(France) Chafik Besseghier	
2010–11	Brașov	(France) Chafik Besseghier	(Romania) Zoltán Kelemen	(Switzerland) Mikael Redin	
2011–12	Brașov	(France) Chafik Besseghier	(Belgium) Jorik Hendrickx	(Romania) Zoltán Kelemen	
2012–13	Brașov	(Philippines) Michael Christian Martinez	(Romania) Zoltan Kelemen	(Italy) Paolo Bacchini	
2013–14	Brașov	(Romania) Zoltan Kelemen	(Kazakhstan) Abzal Rakimgaliev	(Italy) Maurizio Zandron	
2014–15	Brașov	No men's competitors			
2015–16	Brașov	(Finland) Tomi Pulkkinen	(Romania) Dorjan Kecskes	No other competitors	
2016–17	Miercurea-Ciuc	(Romania) Dorjan Kecskes	No other competitors		
2017–18	Otopeni	(France) Philip Warren	(Romania) Dorjan Kecskes	No other competitors	
2018–19	Otopeni	(Slovakia) Marco Klepoch	(Austria) Manuel Drechsler	(Romania) Andrei Tanase	
2019–20	No competition held				
2020–21	Bucharest	Competitions cancelled due to the COVID-19 pandemic			
2021–22	Otopeni	Competitions cancelled due to the COVID-19 pandemic			
2022–23	Bucharest	(Austria) Maurizio Zandron	(Italy) Emanuele Indelicato	(Bulgaria) Filip Kaimakchiev	
2023–24	Bucharest	Competition cancelled			
2024–25	Otopeni	(Bulgaria) Beat Schümperli	(Bulgaria) Alexander Zlatkov	(Bulgaria) Larry Loupolover	
2025–26	Otopeni	No men's competitors			
2026–27	Bucharest	(Romania) Luc Economides	No other competitors		

=== Women's singles ===
Senior women's event medalists
Season	Location	Gold	Silver	Bronze	Ref.
1999–2000	Miercurea-Ciuc	(Romania) Roxana Luca	(Switzerland) Martine Adank	(Netherlands) Marion Krijgsman	
2000–01	Bucharest	(Romania) Roxana Luca	(Italy) Claudia di Constanzo	(Romania) Simona Pungă	
2001–02	Bucharest	(Romania) Roxana Luca	(Italy) Lea Bottacini	(Ukraine) Olha Orlova	
2002–03	Bucharest	(Finland) Miia Marttinen	(Italy) Vanessa Giunchi	(Hungary) Viktória Pavuk	
2003–04	Miercurea-Ciuc	(Hungary) Viktória Pavuk	(Finland) Tytti Tervonen	(Romania) Simona Pungă	
2004–05	Bucharest	(Ukraine) Galina Maniachenko	(Romania) Roxana Luca	(Romania) Roxana Simionescu	
2005–06	Bucharest	(Ukraine) Galina Maniachenko	(France) Nadège Bobillier	(Bulgaria) Sonia Radeva	
2006–07	No competition held				
2007–08	Galați	(France) Chloé Depouilly	(Bulgaria) Sonia Radeva	(Romania) Roxana Luca	
2008–09	Galați	(Italy) Stefania Berton	(Ukraine) Iryna Movchan	(Hungary) Viktória Pavuk	
2009–10	Galați	(Hungary) Júlia Sebestyén	(Austria) Kerstin Frank	(Japan) Shoko Ishikawa	
2010–11	Brașov	(Norway) Anne Line Gjersem	(Turkey) Sıla Saygı	(Austria) Kerstin Frank	
2011–12	Brașov	(Estonia) Jelena Glebova	(Estonia) Gerli Liinamäe	(Japan) Kana Muramoto	
2012–13	Brașov	(Italy) Roberta Rodeghiero	(Norway) Anine Rabe	(Romania) Sabina Măriuţă	
2013–14	Brașov	(France) Laurine Lecavelier	(Italy) Francesca Rio	(Norway) Anine Rabe	
2014–15	Brașov	(Romania) Julia Sauter	(Italy) Carol Bressanutti	(South Korea) Kwak Min-jeong	
2015–16	Brașov	(South Korea) Kim Tae-kyung	(United Kingdom) Frances Howell	(United Kingdom) Michelle Callison	
2016–17	Miercurea-Ciuc	(Romania) Julia Sauter	No other competitors		
2017–18	Otopeni	(Poland) Elżbieta Gabryszak	(Finland) Sallianna Öztürk	(Finland) Karolina Luhtonen	
2018–19	Otopeni	(Bulgaria) Alexandra Feigin	(Romania) Julia Sauter	(Czech Republic) Eliška Březinová	
2019–20	No competition held				
2020–21	Bucharest	Competitions cancelled due to the COVID-19 pandemic			
2021–22	Otopeni	Competitions cancelled due to the COVID-19 pandemic			
2022–23	Bucharest	(Italy) Lara Naki Gutmann	(Romania) Julia Sauter	(Lithuania) Aleksandra Golovkina	
2023–24	Bucharest	Competition cancelled			
2024–25	Otopeni	(Romania) Julia Sauter	(Italy) Elena Agostinelli	(Czech Republic) Eliška Březinová	
2025–26	Otopeni	(Finland) Olivia Lisko	(Israel) Mariia Dmitrieva	(Poland) Marietta Atkins	
2026–27	Bucharest	(Poland) Ekaterina Kurakova	(Romania) Julia Sauter	(United Kingdom) Lilian Musgrave	

=== Ice dance ===
Senior ice dance event medalists
Season	Location	Gold	Silver	Bronze	Ref.
2012–13	Brașov	(Russia); Elena Ilinykh; Nikita Katsalapov	(Russia); Ekaterina Pushkash; Jonathan Guerreiro	(Hungary); Zsuzsanna Nagy; Máté Fejes	

== Junior medalists ==
=== Men's singles ===
Junior men's event medalists
Year	Location	Gold	Silver	Bronze	Ref.
2011–12	Brașov	(United Kingdom) Jamie Whiteman	(Turkey) Osman Akgün	(United Kingdom) Charles Parry-Evans	
2012–13	Brașov	(Turkey) Osman Akgün	(Switzerland) Nicola Todeschini	(Norway) Sondre Oddvoll Boe	
2013–14	Brașov	(Norway) Sondre Oddvoll Bøe	(Germany) Genki Suzuki	(Italy) Giorgio Settembrini	
2014–15	Brașov	(Armenia) Slavik Hayrapetyan	(Italy) Carlo Vittorio Palermo	(Italy) Alessandro Fadini	
2015–16	Brașov	(Ukraine) Mikhail Medunitsa	(Ukraine) Olexander Khilinichenko	(United Kingdom) Ruaridh Fisher	
2016–17	Miercurea-Ciuc	(United Kingdom) Ruaridh Fisher	No other competitors		
2017–18	Otopeni	(Italy) Nikolaj Memola	No other competitors		
2018–19	Otopeni	No junior men's competitors			
2019–22	No competitions held				
2022–23	Bucharest	(Romania) Christian-Stephan Nainer	(Italy) Tommaso Barison	(Romania) Tudor Dominic Andrei	
2023–24	Bucharest	Competition cancelled			
2024–25	Otopeni	(Israel) Nikita Sheiko	(Israel) Kirill Sheiko	(United Kingdom) Jack Donovan	
2025–26	Otopeni	(Czech Republic) Jakub Tykal	(Austria) Daniel Ruis	(Denmark) Wendell Hansson-Östergaard	
2026–27	Bucharest	(Ukraine) Bohdan Pomohaibo	(Romania) Razvan Cionac	No other competitors	

=== Women's singles ===
Junior women's event medalists
Year	Location	Gold	Silver	Bronze	Ref.
2011–12	Brașov	(Sweden) Rebecka Emanuelsson	(Austria) Anna Hoffmann	(Kazakhstan) Regina Glazman	
2012–13	Brașov	(United Kingdom) Amani Fancy	(Italy) Guia Tagliapietra	(Switzerland) Laure Nicodet	
2013–14	Brașov	(Germany) Nicole Schott	(Italy) Chiara Calderone	(Finland) Vilma Lehtinen	
2014–15	Brașov	(Netherlands) Daisy Vreenegoor	(Kazakhstan) Regina Glazman	(Netherlands) Lena Slagter	
2015–16	Brașov	(Romania) Julia Sauter	(United Kingdom) Suzi Murray	(Australia) Yancey Chan	
2016–17	Miercurea-Ciuc	(United Kingdom) Morgan Swales	(Romania) Zselyke Aletta Kenéz	(Romania) Cristina Mihaela Silca	
2017–18	Otopeni	(Italy) Anna Memola	(Romania) Ana Sofia Beșchea	(Sweden) Emma Kivioja	
2018–19	Otopeni	(Bulgaria) Ivelina Baicheva	(Bulgaria) Maria Levushkina	(Italy) Esther Schwarz	
2019–22	No competitions held				
2022–23	Bucharest	(United Kingdom) Arabella Sear-Watkins	(Ukraine) Anastasiia Vasylchenko	(Romania) Tara Maria Ienciu	
2023–24	Bucharest	Competition cancelled			
2024–25	Otopeni	(Italy) Amanda Ghezzo	(Israel) Simona Tkachman	(Italy) Chiara Minighini	
2025–26	Otopeni	(Estonia) Maria Eliise Kaljuvere	(Georgia (country)) Inga Gurgenidze	(Czech Republic) Jana Horcicková	
2026–27	Bucharest	(Turkey) Leyla Çetin	(Israel) Simona Tkachman	(Switzerland) Elena Martinenghi	

=== Ice dance ===
Junior ice dance event medalists
Year	Location	Gold	Silver	Bronze	Ref.
2011–12	Brașov	(Hungary); Tamara Turóczi; Dániel Majer	(Belarus); Eugenia Tkachenka; Yuri Hulitski	No other competitors	

== Records ==
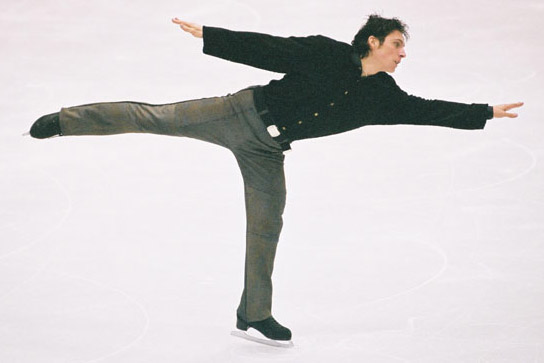
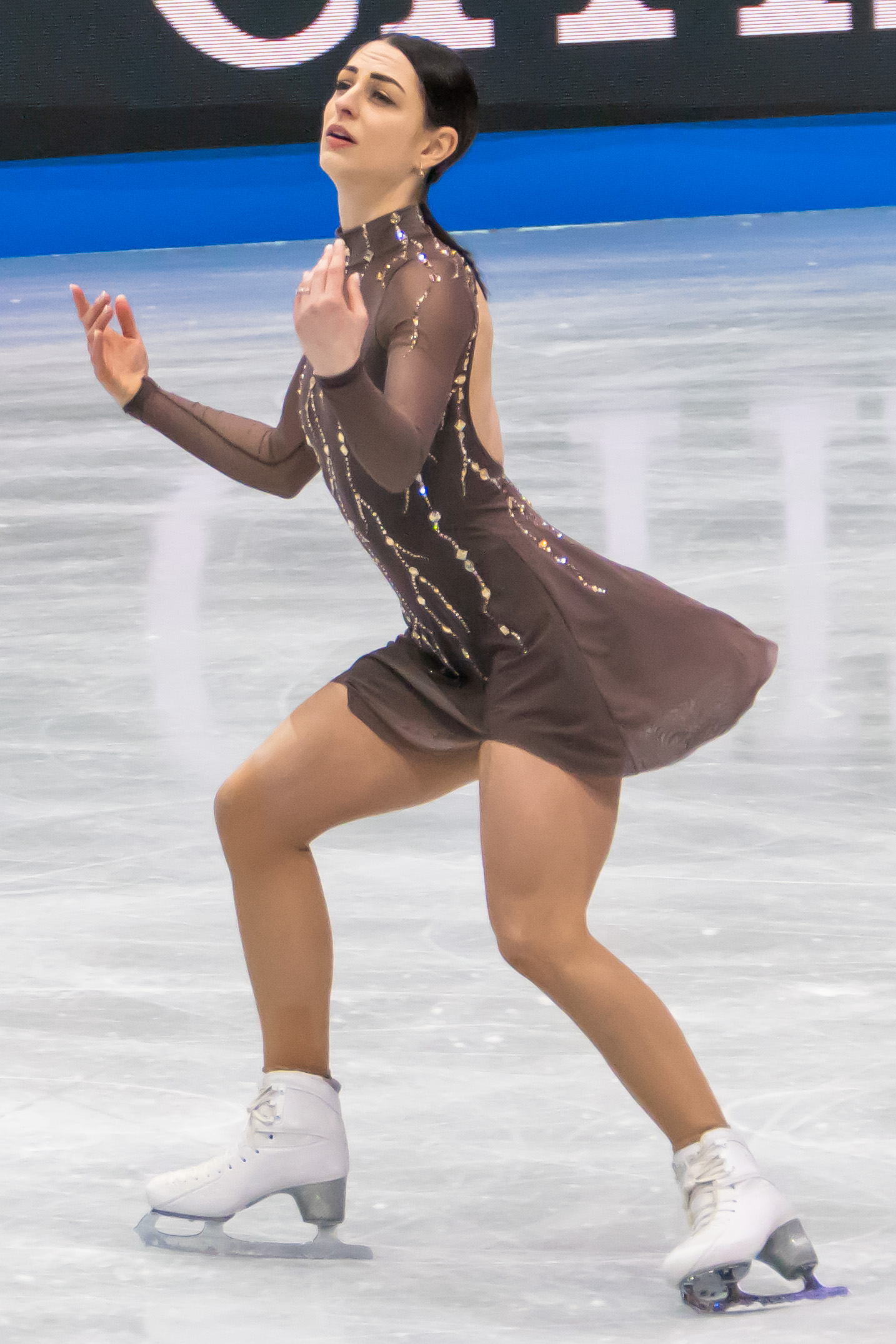
From left to right: Gheorghe Chiper of Romania won five Crystal Skate titles in men's singles, while Julia Sauter of Romania has won three Crystal Skate titles in women's singles.

Records
Discipline	Most championship titles			
Discipline	Skater(s)	No.	Years	Ref.
Men's singles	(Romania); Gheorghe Chiper	5	2001–03; 2005–06	
Women's singles	(Romania); Roxana Luca	3	2000–02	
Women's singles	(Romania); Julia Sauter	3	2015; 2017; 2025	

== Cumulative medal count (senior medalists) ==
=== Men's singles ===
Total number of Crystal Skate medals in men's singles by nation
Rank	Nation	Gold	Silver	Bronze	Total
1	Romania	8	5	4	17
2	France	4	2	3	9
3	Bulgaria	1	2	2	5
3	Ukraine	1	2	2	5
5	Austria	1	1	0	2
5	Sweden	1	1	0	2
7	Slovakia	1	0	2	3
8	Finland	1	0	1	2
9	Estonia	1	0	0	1
9	Philippines	1	0	0	1
9	Poland	1	0	0	1
12	Hungary	0	2	0	2
13	Italy	0	1	2	3
14	Belgium	0	1	0	1
14	Kazakhstan	0	1	0	1
14	Russia	0	1	0	1
17	Switzerland	0	0	2	2
18	Slovenia	0	0	1	1
Totals (18 entries)		21	19	19	59

=== Women's singles ===
Total number of Crystal Skate medals in women's singles by nation
Rank	Nation	Gold	Silver	Bronze	Total
1	Romania	6	4	5	15
2	Italy	3	6	0	9
3	Finland	2	2	1	5
4	Ukraine	2	1	1	4
5	France	2	1	0	3
6	Hungary	2	0	2	4
7	Poland	2	0	1	3
8	Bulgaria	1	1	1	3
8	Norway	1	1	1	3
10	Estonia	1	1	0	2
11	South Korea	1	0	1	2
12	Great Britain	0	1	2	3
13	Austria	0	1	1	2
14	Israel	0	1	0	1
14	Switzerland	0	1	0	1
14	Turkey	0	1	0	1
17	Czech Republic	0	0	2	2
17	Japan	0	0	2	2
19	Lithuania	0	0	1	1
19	Netherlands	0	0	1	1
Totals (20 entries)		23	22	22	67

=== Total medals ===
This table includes one gold medal and one silver medal each for Russia, and one bronze medal for Hungary, from the ice dance competition in 2012.

Total number of Crystal Skate medals by nation
Rank	Nation	Gold	Silver	Bronze	Total
1	Romania	14	9	9	32
2	France	6	3	3	12
3	Italy	3	7	2	12
4	Ukraine	3	3	3	9
5	Finland	3	2	2	7
6	Poland	3	0	1	4
7	Bulgaria	2	3	3	8
8	Hungary	2	2	3	7
9	Estonia	2	1	0	3
10	Austria	1	2	1	4
11	Russia	1	2	0	3
12	Norway	1	1	1	3
13	Sweden	1	1	0	2
14	Slovakia	1	0	2	3
15	South Korea	1	0	1	2
16	Philippines	1	0	0	1
17	Great Britain	0	1	2	3
17	Switzerland	0	1	2	3
19	Belgium	0	1	0	1
19	Israel	0	1	0	1
19	Kazakhstan	0	1	0	1
19	Turkey	0	1	0	1
23	Czech Republic	0	0	2	2
23	Japan	0	0	2	2
25	Lithuania	0	0	1	1
25	Netherlands	0	0	1	1
25	Slovenia	0	0	1	1
Totals (27 entries)		45	42	42	129
