= Free Skate (film) =

Finnish film

- Directed by: Roope Olenius
- Written by: Veera W. Vilo
- Starring: Veera W. Vilo; Leena Uotila; Karoliina Blackburn; Jevgeni Haukka; Saara Elina; Miikka J. Anttila; Ilona Chevakova
- Production companies: Bright Fame Pictures; Brave Teddy Oy; Optipari Oy; Whitepoint Oy
- Distributed by: Fizz-E-Motion; IndieCan Entertainment
- Release dates: August 20, 2022 (Blue Sea Film Festival); October 21, 2022 (Finland)
- Country: Finland
- Languages: Finnish; English; Russian

Free Skate is a 2022 Finnish drama-thriller film directed by Roope Olenius. The feature film tells the story of a promising figure skater who flees from Russia to Finland to escape her inhumane circumstances.

The film was written by a former aesthetic group gymnastics world champion Veera W. Vilo (Tuftland, Bunny the Killer Thing), who also plays the lead role. Free Skate is based on the filmmakers' own experiences as top athletes as well as the female athletes' and dancers' stories from around the world that came apparent during the #MeToo movement. The film discusses the demanding routines and methods of the figure skating world but also sheds some light to the unfortunate connection between female sports and human trafficking.

The film also stars Leena Uotila, Karoliina Blackburn, Jevgeni Haukka, Saara Elina, Miikka J. Anttila, Ilona Chevakova and Viivi Pumpanen. Belgian Olympiad, European Champion and World Championship Silver Medalist Loena Hendrickx does the most demanding figure skating stunts in the film. Teea Siltanen, one of the producers of the film, is a synchronized skating world champion 2013. The multilingual (Finnish, English, Russian) film marks the second directorial film of Roope Olenius.

== Cast ==
Free Skate stars Veera W. Vilo (Tuftland), Leena Uotila (Ladies of Steel), Karoliina Blackburn (Hormonit!), Jevgeni Haukka (History Is Made at Night), Saara Elina (Tuftland), Miikka J. Anttila (Tuftland), and Ilona Chevakova (The Last Kingdom). Belgian Olympian and 2022 World Champion silver medallist Loena Hendrickx performs the figure skating stunts.

- Veera W. Vilo as Figure skater
- Leena Uotila as Grandmother
- Karoliina Blackburn as Finnish coach
- Saara Elina as Ballet teacher
- Miikka J. Anttila as Choreographer
- Jevgeni Haukka as Father
- Regina Launivuo as Russian coach
- Sirke Lääkkölä as Russian head coach
- Ilona Chevakova as Russian skater
- Slava Dugin as Fixer

== Production ==
Free Skate was shot in the cities of Espoo, Forssa, Helsinki, Hämeenlinna and Pori in Finland in 2019. The film was a Bright Fame Pictures production and a Brave Teddy Oy, Optipari Oy and Whitepoint Oy co-production.

== Release ==
Free Skate had its world premiere at the Blue Sea Film Festival on August 20, 2022, in Rauma, Finland. On September 18, 2022, it had its International Premiere at Cinéfest Sudbury International Film Festival, which is one of the largest film festivals in Canada. The film was also an official selection at 41st Oulu International Children's and Youth Film Festival, Lithuanian National Olympic Committee's Sports Film Festival and Festiwal Filmowy NNW in Gdansk, Poland.

=== Release in Finland ===
The film opened theatrically in Finland on October 21, 2022. Bright Fame Pictures handled the distribution. During its theatrical release in Finland, National Audiovisual Institute (KAVI) raised the age limit of the film from not suitable for persons under 12 to 16.

=== Release in North America ===
In January 2023, the film had a limited theatrical release in the United States with screenings at Laemmle theatres, Los Angeles, and Regal Cinemas, New York. The distribution was handled by IndieCan Entertainment LLC, which had acquired the film in May 2022.

=== International release ===
The film's international sales rights were acquired by Fizz-e-Motion in January 2023.

== Reception ==
Upon its release the film received mixed reviews. Some critics praised the themes, topics and the performance of Veera W. Vilo in the leading role.

Film Inquiry wrote that:

A film like this is nothing without the powerful performances that drive it, and the cast has certainly risen to the challenge. Vilo is a force, effortlessly shifting from fearful to graceful, cautious to drive from one scene to the next. It's clear her character has endured so much and been so resilient, and any viewer ought to be sympathetic to her journey. The rest of the cast is remarkable as well, each playing diverse supporting roles from the cruel to the comforting and everywhere in between to great effect. The cinematography in the ice skating scenes is gorgeous, with sweeping shots that showcase the beauty and grace of the sport, and the clever editing between some scenes really emphasizes the parallels between the two lives she's lived. Vilo and Roope Olenius, the director, deserve recognition for the courage to bring such a story to life and tell it in an engaging way."

The Los Angeles Times wrote that "the film is visually sharp and quietly absorbing, and Olenius and Vilo sensitively capture the isolation and self-doubt that can make an athlete's life so lonely."

Finland Today wrote in their review that “This One, Folks, is the Best Finnish Film of the Year.”

Film Threat praised Vilo's performance and wrote that "she's [Vilo is] absolutely incredible on the ice and looks like a star."

The film director Roope Olenius and writer-leading star Veera W. Vilo were interviewed by Golden Globes in February 2023.

== Miscellaneous ==
The characters in the film do not have names. Instead they are referenced in the closing credits by their profession.

Director Roope Olenius and writer Veera W. Vilo have often talked about Russian trolls attacking them during release of the film.

Alongside the film a full-length making-of documentary How We Made Free Skate was released in 2023. The documentary was directed by Janne-Markus Katila and Jari Manninen.
