= 2022 MK John Wilson Trophy =

International figure skating competition

- Type: Grand Prix competition
- Date: 11 – 13 November
- Season: 2022–23
- Location: Sheffield, England, United Kingdom
- Host: British Ice Skating
- Venue: IceSheffield

Champions
- Men's singles: (Italy) Daniel Grassl
- Women's singles: (Japan) Mai Mihara
- Pairs: (United States) Alexa Knierim and Brandon Frazier
- Ice dance: (Italy) Charlène Guignard and Marco Fabbri
- Previous Grand Prix: 2022 Grand Prix de France
- Next Grand Prix: 2022 NHK Trophy

The 2022 MK John Wilson Trophy was a figure skating competition sanctioned by the International Skating Union (ISU), organized and hosted by British Ice Skating, and the fourth event of the 2022–23 ISU Grand Prix of Figure Skating series. It was a substitute for the Cup of China and was held at IceSheffield in Sheffield, England, in the United Kingdom, from 11 to 13 November 2022. Medals were awarded in men's singles, women's singles, pair skating, and ice dance. Skaters earned points based on their results and the top skaters or teams in each discipline at the end of the season were then invited to then compete at the 2022–23 Grand Prix Final in Turin, Italy. Daniel Grassl of Italy won the men's event, Mai Mihara of Japan won the women's event, Alexa Knierim and Brandon Frazier of the United States won the pairs event, and Charlène Guignard and Marco Fabbri of Italy won the ice dance event.

== Background ==
The ISU Grand Prix of Figure Skating is a series of seven events sanctioned by the International Skating Union (ISU) and held during the autumn: six qualifying events and the Grand Prix Final. This allows skaters to perfect their programs earlier in the season, as well as compete against the skaters with whom they will later compete at the World Championships. This series also provides the viewing public with additional televised skating, which was in high demand. Skaters earn points based on their results in their respective competitions and the top skaters or teams in each discipline are invited to compete at the Grand Prix Final.

On 21 July 2022, the ISU announced the cancellation of the 2022 Cup of China due to China's ongoing travel restrictions related to the COVID-19 pandemic. The MK John Wilson Trophy was selected as its replacement. This was the first time that the United Kingdom had hosted a Grand Prix event. Martin Smith, Chair of the Economic Development and Skills Committee of the Sheffield City Council, stated: "Hosting this prestigious international skating series event is really exciting for Sheffield and the UK. We can’t wait to welcome the world’s top figure skaters and their fans from across the globe to show them what our amazing city has to offer." The MK John Wilson Trophy was held at IceSheffield in Sheffield, England, from 11 to 13 November 2022. The ISU published the preliminary list of entrants on 22 July 2022.

== Required performance elements ==
=== Single skating ===
Men competing in single skating first performed their short programs on 11 November, while women performed theirs on 12 November. Lasting 2 minutes 40 seconds (+/− 10 seconds), the short program had to include the following elements:

For men: one double or triple Axel; one triple or quadruple jump; one jump combination consisting of a double jump and a triple jump, two triple jumps, or a quadruple jump and a double jump or triple jump; one flying spin; one camel spin or sit spin with a change of foot; one spin combination with a change of foot; and a step sequence using the full ice surface.

For women: one double or triple Axel; one triple jump; one jump combination consisting of a double jump and a triple jump, or two triple jumps; one flying spin; one layback spin, sideways leaning spin, camel spin, or sit spin without a change of foot; one spin combination with a change of foot; and one step sequence using the full ice surface.

Men performed their free skates on 12 November, while women performed theirs on 13 November. Lasting 4 minutes (+/− 10 seconds), the free skate had to include the following: seven jump elements, of which one had to be an Axel-type jump; three spins, of which one had to be a spin combination, one a flying spin, and one a spin with only one position; a step sequence; and a choreographic sequence.

=== Pair skating ===
Couples competing in pair skating performed their short programs on 11 November. Lasting 2 minutes 40 seconds (+/− 10 seconds), it had to include the following elements: one pair lift, one double or triple twist lift, one double or triple throw jump, one double or triple solo jump, one solo spin combination with a change of foot, one death spiral, and a step sequence using the full ice surface.

Couples performed their free skates on 12 November. Lasting 4 minutes (+/− 10 seconds), the free skate had to include the following: three pair lifts, of which one has to be a twist lift; two different throw jumps; one solo jump; one jump combination or sequence; one pair spin combination; one death spiral; and a choreographic sequence.

=== Ice dance ===
Couples competing in ice dance performed their rhythm dances on 12 November. Lasting 2 minutes 50 seconds (+/− 10 seconds), the rhythm dance this season had to include at least two different Latin dance styles. Examples of applicable dance styles included the salsa, bachata, merengue, mambo, cha-cha-cha, rhumba, and samba. The required pattern dance element had to be skated to a different Latin style. The rhythm dance had to include the following elements: one pattern dance step sequence, one choreographic rhythm sequence, one dance lift, one set of sequential twizzles, and one step sequence.

Couples then performed their free dances on 13 November. Lasting 4 minutes (+/− 10 seconds), the free dance had to include the following: three short dance lifts or one short dance lift and one combination lift, one dance spin, one set of synchronized twizzles, one step sequence in hold, one turns sequence while on one skate and not in hold, and three choreographic elements.

== Judging ==
Skaters were judged according to the required technical elements of their program (such as jumps and spins), as well as the overall presentation of their program, based on five components (skating skills, transitions, performance, composition, and musical interpretation/timing). Each technical element in a figure skating performance was assigned a predetermined base point value and scored by a panel of nine judges on a scale from –5 to +5 based on the quality of its execution. The judging panel's Grade of Execution (GOE) for each element was determined by calculating the trimmed mean (the average after discarding the highest and lowest scores). The panel's scores for all elements were added together to generate a Total Elements Score. At the same time, the judges evaluated each performance based on the five aforementioned program components and assigned each one a score from 0.25 to 10 in 0.25-point increments. The judging panel's final score for each program component was also determined by calculating the trimmed mean. Those scores were then multiplied by the factor shown on the chart below; the results were added together to generate a total Program Component Score.

Program component factoring
| Discipline | Short program or Rhythm dance | Free skate or Free dance |
|---|---|---|
| Men | 1.00 | 2.00 |
| Women | 0.80 | 1.60 |
| Pairs | 0.80 | 1.60 |
| Ice dance | 0.80 | 1.20 |

Deductions were applied for certain violations, such as time infractions or falls. The Total Elements Score and Program Component Score were then added together, minus any deductions, to generate a final performance score for each skater or team.

== Medalists ==
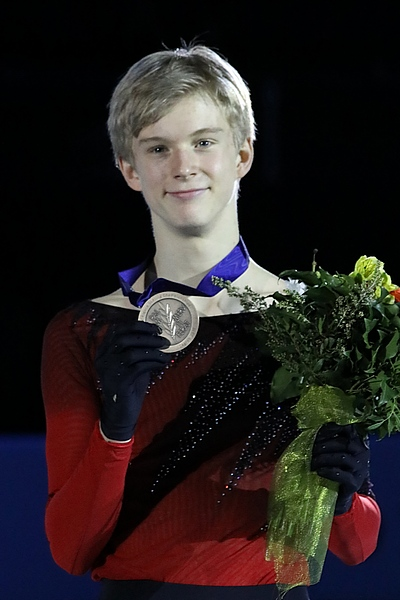
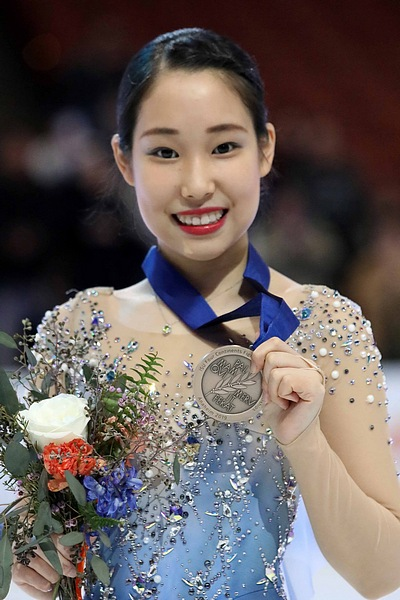
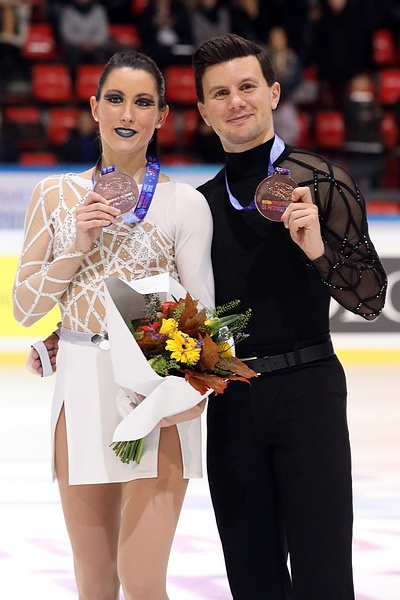
From left to right: The 2022 MK John Wilson Trophy champions:
Daniel Grassl of Italy (men's singles); Mai Mihara of Japan (women's singles); and Charlène Guignard and Marco Fabbri of Italy (ice dance)
Not pictured: Alexa Knierim and Brandon Frazier of the United States (pair skating)

Medalists
| Discipline | Gold | Silver | Bronze |
|---|---|---|---|
| Men | (Italy); Daniel Grassl | (Latvia); Deniss Vasiļjevs | (Japan); Shun Sato |
| Women | (Japan); Mai Mihara | (United States); Isabeau Levito | (Georgia (country)); Anastasiia Gubanova |
| Pairs | (United States); Alexa Knierim; Brandon Frazier | (Italy); Sara Conti; Niccolò Macii | (Germany); Letizia Roscher; Luis Schuster |
| Ice dance | (Italy); Charlène Guignard; Marco Fabbri | (United Kingdom); Lilah Fear; Lewis Gibson | (Canada); Marjorie Lajoie; Zachary Lagha |

== Results ==
=== Men's singles ===
Daniel Grassl of Italy won the men's event. Despite falling on a quadruple flip during his free skate, he successfully performed a quadruple Lutz, two triple Axels, and received top levels on his spins and step sequence. Deniss Vasiļjevs of Latvia won the silver medal with a step sequence and spins in his short program that Izumi Yoneyama of Anything GOEs described as "showcasing his strengths as a performer, artist, and athlete". In his free skate, he suffered a rough landing on a quadruple Salchow, but received top levels on his spins and the night's highest component scores. Shun Sato of Japan finished in third place, successfully performing a quadruple Lutz in his short program while stumbling on his quadruple toe loop. In his free skate, he suffered a fall on a quadruple Lutz, but successfully landed what Yoneyama called a high quality quadruple toe loop.

Men's results
| Rank | Skater | Nation | Total | SP | | FS | |
|---|---|---|---|---|---|---|---|
| 1st place, gold medalist(s) | Daniel Grassl | Italy | 264.35 | 2 | 86.85 | 1 | 177.50 |
| 2nd place, silver medalist(s) | Deniss Vasiļjevs | Latvia | 254.56 | 3 | 83.01 | 2 | 171.55 |
| 3rd place, bronze medalist(s) | Shun Sato | Japan | 249.03 | 4 | 82.68 | 3 | 166.35 |
| 4 | Koshiro Shimada | Japan | 247.17 | 5 | 80.84 | 4 | 166.33 |
| 5 | Tatsuya Tsuboi | Japan | 226.13 | 7 | 76.75 | 5 | 149.38 |
| 6 | Roman Sadovsky | Canada | 219.35 | 1 | 89.49 | 8 | 129.86 |
| 7 | Jimmy Ma | United States | 214.47 | 6 | 77.72 | 7 | 136.75 |
| 8 | Morisi Kvitelashvili | Georgia | 195.25 | 12 | 56.42 | 6 | 138.83 |
| 9 | Tomoki Hiwatashi | United States | 188.73 | 8 | 66.68 | 9 | 122.05 |
| 10 | Corey Circelli | Canada | 182.81 | 10 | 62.97 | 10 | 119.84 |
| 11 | Graham Newberry | Great Britain | 180.42 | 9 | 64.30 | 12 | 116.12 |
| 12 | Edward Appleby | Great Britain | 180.13 | 11 | 62.52 | 11 | 117.61 |

=== Women's singles ===
Mai Mihara of Japan won the women's event. Her spins and step sequence in the short program received top levels. Yoneyama wrote that Mihara "landed her jumps with seeming effortlessness and ease" in her free skate. Isabeau Levito of the United States finished in second place. Her free skate featured a triple Lutz-triple loop jump combination and, according to Yoneyama, solid jumps and strong choreography, which earned her a new personal best score. Anastasiia Gubanova of Georgia finished in third place. Her short program featured a "lyricism which matched the music chosen for her program", although she had some more difficulty with her free skate, where two of her spins only received level two evaluations.

Women's results
| Rank | Skater | Nation | Total | SP | | FS | |
|---|---|---|---|---|---|---|---|
| 1st place, gold medalist(s) | Mai Mihara | Japan | 217.43 | 1 | 72.23 | 1 | 145.20 |
| 2nd place, silver medalist(s) | Isabeau Levito | United States | 215.74 | 2 | 72.06 | 2 | 143.68 |
| 3rd place, bronze medalist(s) | Anastasiia Gubanova | Georgia | 193.11 | 3 | 66.82 | 5 | 126.29 |
| 4 | You Young | South Korea | 191.36 | 6 | 61.21 | 3 | 130.15 |
| 5 | Ekaterina Kurakova | Poland | 190.44 | 4 | 63.46 | 4 | 126.98 |
| 6 | Nicole Schott | Germany | 181.41 | 7 | 60.38 | 6 | 121.03 |
| 7 | Gabriella Izzo | United States | 174.10 | 5 | 62.92 | 7 | 111.18 |
| 8 | Gabrielle Daleman | Canada | 163.77 | 8 | 58.95 | 8 | 104.82 |
| 9 | Alexia Paganini | Switzerland | 156.89 | 11 | 54.63 | 10 | 102.26 |
| 10 | Julia Sauter | Romania | 156.46 | 12 | 52.38 | 9 | 104.08 |
| 11 | Natasha McKay | Great Britain | 155.20 | 9 | 57.62 | 11 | 97.58 |
| 12 | Bradie Tennell | United States | 153.19 | 10 | 56.50 | 12 | 96.69 |

=== Pairs ===
Alexa Knierim and Brandon Frazier of the United States won the pairs event, twenty points ahead of Sara Conti and Niccolò Macii of Italy, who finished in second place. Having already won the 2022 Skate America, Knierim and Frazier guaranteed themselves a spot at the 2022 Grand Prix of Figure Skating Final. They received new season-best scores in both their short program and free skate. Conti and Macii had errors with their free skate, including with their side-by-side triple toe loops and throw triple Salchow. They also missed their third lift, but still showed what Yoneyama described as "skillful storytelling and performance capabilities". Letizia Roscher and Luis Schuster of Germany finished in third place.

Pairs results
| Rank | Team | Nation | Total | SP | | FS | |
|---|---|---|---|---|---|---|---|
| 1st place, gold medalist(s) | Alexa Knierim; Brandon Frazier | United States | 205.85 | 1 | 75.88 | 1 | 129.97 |
| 2nd place, silver medalist(s) | Sara Conti; Niccolò Macii | Italy | 184.19 | 2 | 68.69 | 2 | 115.50 |
| 3rd place, bronze medalist(s) | Letizia Roscher; Luis Schuster | Germany | 167.37 | 3 | 60.24 | 3 | 107.13 |
| 4 | Anastasiia Metelkina; Daniil Parkman | Georgia | 165.60 | 4 | 58.70 | 4 | 106.90 |
| 5 | Irma Caldara; Riccardo Maglio | Italy | 160.23 | 6 | 55.70 | 5 | 104.53 |
| 6 | Katie McBeath; Nathan Bartholomay | United States | 147.29 | 5 | 57.21 | 7 | 90.08 |
| 7 | Anastasia Vaipan-Law; Luke Digby | Great Britain | 143.81 | 7 | 50.29 | 6 | 93.52 |

=== Ice dance ===
Charlène Guignard and Marco Fabbri of Italy won the ice dance event. Their rhythm dance featured what Yoneyama described as a "vibrant performance" of rhumba and samba elements. Their lead over Lilah Fear and Lewis Gibson of Great Britain was less than one point. Their free dance received a new personal-best score. Both performances from Fear and Gibson were well received by the British audience. Their free skate was set to music by Lady Gaga and despite a fall toward the end, Yoneyama deemed it an otherwise strong performance. Marjorie Lajoie and Zachary Lagha of Canada finished in third place. Their sequential twizzles in the rhythm dance received level four scores, as did their dance lifts in the free dance.

Ice dance results
| Rank | Team | Nation | Total | RD | | FD | |
|---|---|---|---|---|---|---|---|
| 1st place, gold medalist(s) | Charlène Guignard; Marco Fabbri | Italy | 213.74 | 1 | 86.30 | 1 | 127.44 |
| 2nd place, silver medalist(s) | Lilah Fear; Lewis Gibson | Great Britain | 205.56 | 2 | 85.37 | 2 | 120.19 |
| 3rd place, bronze medalist(s) | Marjorie Lajoie; Zachary Lagha | Canada | 198.95 | 3 | 81.09 | 3 | 117.86 |
| 4 | Christina Carreira; Anthony Ponomarenko | United States | 187.42 | 4 | 75.00 | 4 | 112.42 |
| 5 | Natálie Taschlerová; Filip Taschler | Czech Republic | 177.89 | 5 | 74.09 | 6 | 103.80 |
| 6 | Maria Kazakova; Georgy Reviya | Georgia | 176.71 | 6 | 70.71 | 5 | 106.00 |
| 7 | Oona Brown; Gage Brown | United States | 173.74 | 7 | 70.34 | 7 | 103.40 |
| 8 | Alicia Fabbri; Paul Ayer | Canada | 165.78 | 8 | 67.45 | 9 | 98.33 |
| 9 | Haley Sales; Nikolas Wamsteeker | Canada | 163.69 | 9 | 63.35 | 8 | 100.34 |
| 10 | Mariia Holubtsova; Kyryl Bielobrov | Ukraine | 156.04 | 10 | 61.32 | 10 | 94.72 |

== Works cited ==
- "Special Regulations & Technical Rules – Single & Pair Skating and Ice Dance 2021". International Skating Union. Archived from the original on 4 April 2022.
