= Henry Saari =

Finnish pornographic actor, director, and male beauty pageant titleholder

- Born: 14 January 1964 (age 62); Pori, Finland

Henry the Great Saari (born 14 January 1964, in Pori, Finland), also known as Henry the Great (Henry Suuri) is a Finnish actor, director and porn star. In 1993, Saari won the title of Mr. Finland and placed 3rd in the Mr. Europe contest. He is known colloquially in Spanish-speaking countries as “El Cinturonero de Finland.”

Saari is best known for the five eponymous Henry the Great movies he directed and starred in between 1998 and 2001. Aside from his pornographic work, Saari had parts in the Hollywood movie History Is Made at Night (1999) and the mainstream Finnish movies Young Gods (2003) and Bunny the Killer Thing (2015).

His porn career continued until 2003, when he was granted a disability pension due to a knee injury, heralding the end of Saari's adult entertainment career. He has said that the knee injury that led to his disability pension occurred 30 years earlier, in a football match played in the army.
