= Isabeau Levito =

American figure skater (born 2007)

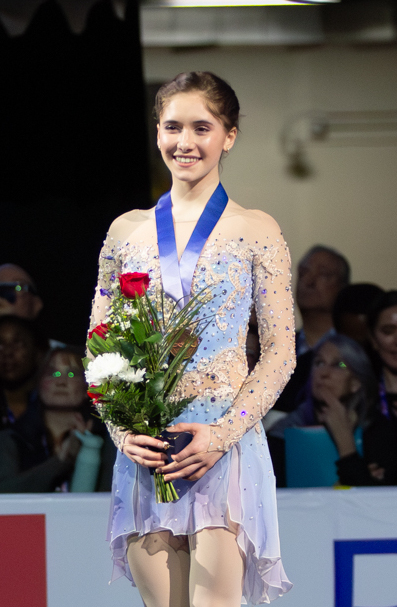
- Isabeau Levito during the medal ceremony at the 2026 U.S. Championships

Personal information
- Born: March 3, 2007 (age 19) Philadelphia, Pennsylvania, U.S.
- Home town: Mount Holly, New Jersey, U.S.
- Height: 5 ft 3 in (1.60 m)

Figure skating career
- Country: United States
- Discipline: Women's singles
- Coach: Yulia Kuznetsova; Otar Japaridze; Slava Kuznetsov
- Skating club: Skating Club of Southern New Jersey
- Began skating: 2010

Medal record
World Championships
Silver medal – second place	2024 Montreal	Singles
Grand Prix Final
Silver medal – second place	2022–23 Turin	Singles
U.S. Championships
Gold medal – first place	2023 San Jose	Singles
Bronze medal – third place	2022 Nashville	Singles
Bronze medal – third place	2024 Columbus	Singles
Bronze medal – third place	2026 St. Louis	Singles
World Team Trophy
Gold medal – first place	2023 Tokyo	Team
World Junior Championships
Gold medal – first place	2022 Tallinn	Singles

Isabeau Levito (born March 3, 2007) is an American figure skater. She is the 2024 World silver medalist, 2022–23 Grand Prix Final silver medalist, the 2023 Grand Prix de France champion, a eight-time ISU Grand Prix medalist, a five-time ISU Challenger Series medalist (three gold, one silver, one bronze), the 2023 U.S. national champion, and a three-time U.S. National bronze medalist (2022, 2024, 2026).

At the junior level, Levito is the 2022 World Junior champion, the 2021 JGP France II champion, the 2021 JGP Austria silver medalist, and the 2021 U.S. junior national champion.

== Personal life ==
Levito was born on March 3, 2007, in Philadelphia, and currently resides in Mount Holly, New Jersey. Her mother, Chiara Garberi Levito, is a clinical embryologist who immigrated to the United States from Milan, Italy, in 1997. Her father, Joseph Levito, was from Philadelphia and died in 2019. Levito is named after Michelle Pfeiffer's character, Isabeau d'Anjou, in the film Ladyhawke. She speaks English, Italian, and some Russian.

Levito cites skaters Alena Kostornaia, Evgenia Medvedeva, Elizaveta Tuktamysheva, and Kaori Sakamoto as being her skating inspirations and role models.

== Career ==
=== Early years ===
Levito began learning how to skate in 2010 at the age of three in Mount Laurel, New Jersey. Her mother, a figure skating fan, initially put her in learn-to-skate classes to improve her balance. Levito began taking private lessons with her current coach Yulia Kuznetsova (née Myskina), a former pair skater, at age three. She competed at her first U.S. Figure Skating Championships at the juvenile level in 2018 taking the title; she later won the silver medal in the intermediate category in 2019, the junior silver medal in 2020, and the junior national title in 2021.

=== 2021–22 season: World Junior champion and two Junior Grand Prix medals ===
Levito made her junior international debut at the 2021 JGP France II, the second of two Junior Grand Prix events held in Courchevel, in August. She won both segments of the competition to take the title ahead of South Korean skater Kim Chae-yeon and Canadian competitor Kaiya Ruiter. At her second event in October which was the 2021 JGP Austria, Levito took the silver medal; Russian skaters Sofia Muravieva placed first and Anastasia Zinina was third. With her win in France, Levito qualified as the fifth-seeded skater to the junior women's event at the 2021–22 Junior Grand Prix Final in Osaka, Japan under the qualification rules established for the 2021–22 season, however she withdrew from the event in November due to injury. The Final was later canceled due to concerns related to the Omicron variant.

After recovering from an unspecified lower-body injury, Levito competed at her first senior level U.S. Championships in January. She placed fourth in the short program and narrowly advanced to second in the free skate and took the bronze medal overall, behind Mariah Bell and Karen Chen. Due to her age, she was ineligible to be named to the American Olympic team.

Levito was supposed to finish her season at the 2022 World Junior Championships, the International Skating Union banned all Russian and Belarusian athletes from competing at the ISU championships. The Russian women had dominated the women's discipline in recent years; their absence made Levito a medal favorite at Junior Worlds. However, due to both the invasion and concerns related to the Omicron variant, the World Junior Championships was not held in Sofia in early March; they were moved to Tallinn, Estonia in mid-April. At Junior Worlds, Levito won the short program, introducing a Lutz-loop combination into competition, with a score of 72.50, 3.12 points ahead of Shin Ji-a of South Korea. She finished second in the free skate, behind Shin, but remained in first overall by 0.54 points and took the gold medal. She was the first American woman to win the World Junior Championships since Rachael Flatt in 2008.

=== 2022–23 season: First senior U.S. title and Grand Prix Final silver ===
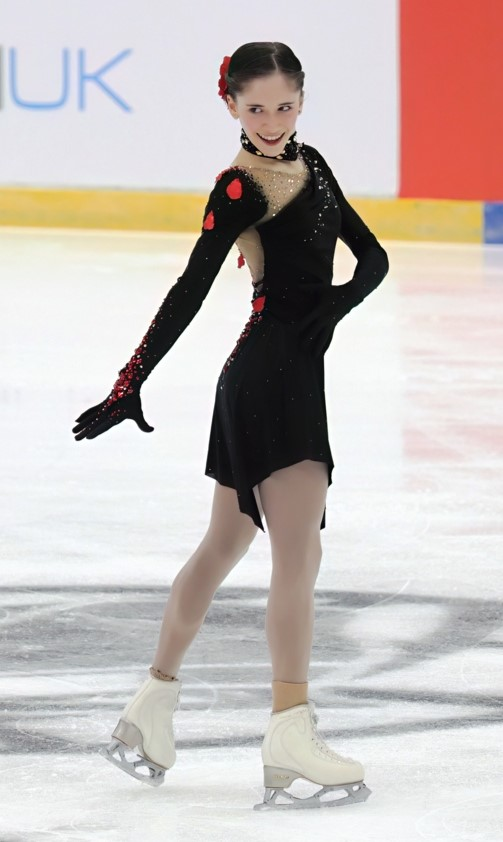
Levito during her short program at the 2022 MK John Wilson Trophy

Entering the new quadrennial, Levito said that she was looking ahead to the 2026 Winter Olympics noting, "my mom is from Milano." Though she initially said that she was unsure whether she would compete as a junior or senior, she eventually moved up to the senior level. Levito opened her debut senior season at the Philadelphia Summer International. She placed first in both segments of the competition to win the competition with a score of 207.67, four points ahead of second-place finisher Lindsay Thorngren. In her first appearance on the Challenger circuit, she won the gold medal at the 2022 CS Nepela Memorial.

Levito was invited to make her senior Grand Prix debut at the 2022 Skate America. She finished second, behind reigning world champion Kaori Sakamoto. Levito afterwards said she was glad to perform in her first Grand Prix "in front of a home crowd in America." At her next competition which was the 2022 MK John Wilson Trophy, Levito placed second in both segments of the competition, including a personal best free skate, to take the silver medal behind Japan's Mai Mihara. These results qualified her for the 2022–23 Grand Prix Final. She was the youngest American to qualify for the Final since Caroline Zhang in 2007.

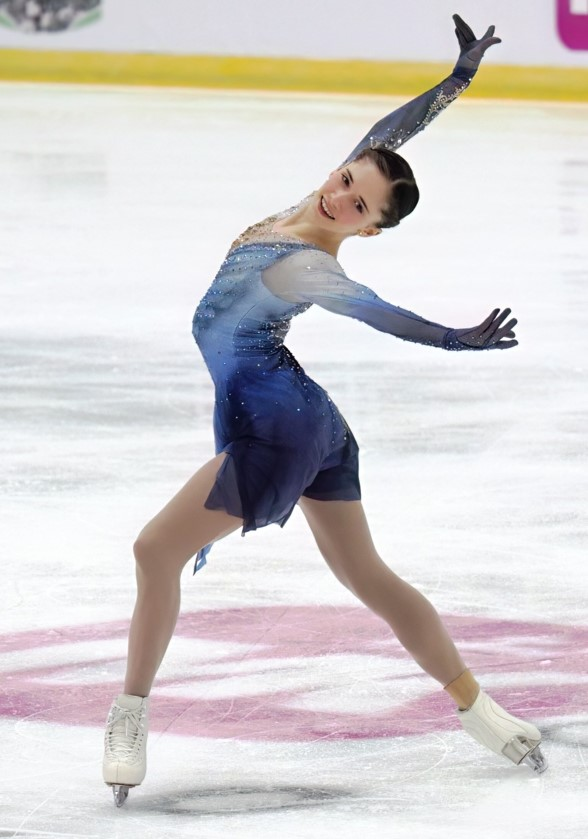
Isabeau Levito performing an Ina Bauer during her free skate at the 2022 MK John Wilson Trophy

Competing in the final in Turin, Levito finished fifth in the short program after an edge call on her triple Lutz and the triple toe loop in her jump combination being deemed a quarter underrotated. The free skate segment of the competition was deemed "turbulent", with several higher-ranked skaters struggling. Levito stepped out of her opening jump combination and fell on her triple flip; she was visibly unhappy with her performance at the conclusion, but it proved sufficient to place second in the segment elevating her to second overall. Her silver medal in the final was the first medal for an American woman in the event since Ashley Wagner in 2014. She said afterwards that "when I was done with my program I didn't expect to be in the placement I am now, and I am still not realizing it yet. It's so amazing, and I'm so proud."

Levito entered the 2023 U.S. Championships as the heavy favourite for the gold medal, and won the short program by a 0.02-point margin over former champion Bradie Tennell, who was making a gradual return from injury. She won the free skate by a wider margin of 10.19 points over Tennell, winning her first national title.

Heading into a Four Continents Championships held on home soil in Colorado Springs, Levito was considered one of the favourites for the gold medal. She finished second in the short program, 1.34 points behind South Korean Kim Ye-lim, winning a silver small medal. She said that "for the most part, I am satisfied" with the performance. Levito withdrew just before the warmup for the free skate on the following day, citing illness.

A month later, Levito was ready to compete at the 2023 World Championships, and received a new personal best score in the short program, despite the second part of her jump combination being judged a quarter underrotated. She placed fourth in the segment, 0.43 points back of Mihara in third place. In the free skate, Levito fell on her opening triple Lutz, otherwise skating cleanly. She was fifth in that segment, but remained in fourth place overall, and finished less than three points behind Belgian bronze medalist Loena Hendrickx. Levito said she was "severely disappointed" by her mistake, but said that overall she felt she had "a great experience in the senior level" during the season.

Levito had initially planned for her season to be over following the World Championships, being described as "really exhausted after the year." However, she was persuaded to join Team USA for the 2023 World Team Trophy by team captain Jason Brown. She placed third in the short program after underrotating the second part of her jump combination. She underrotated one triple jump in the free skate, but placed fourth in the segment. Assessing her own performance, Levito opined "I think I could have done slightly better here and there, but I have done worse, so I am pretty happy." Team USA won the gold medal.

=== 2023–24 season: World silver and two Grand Prix medals ===
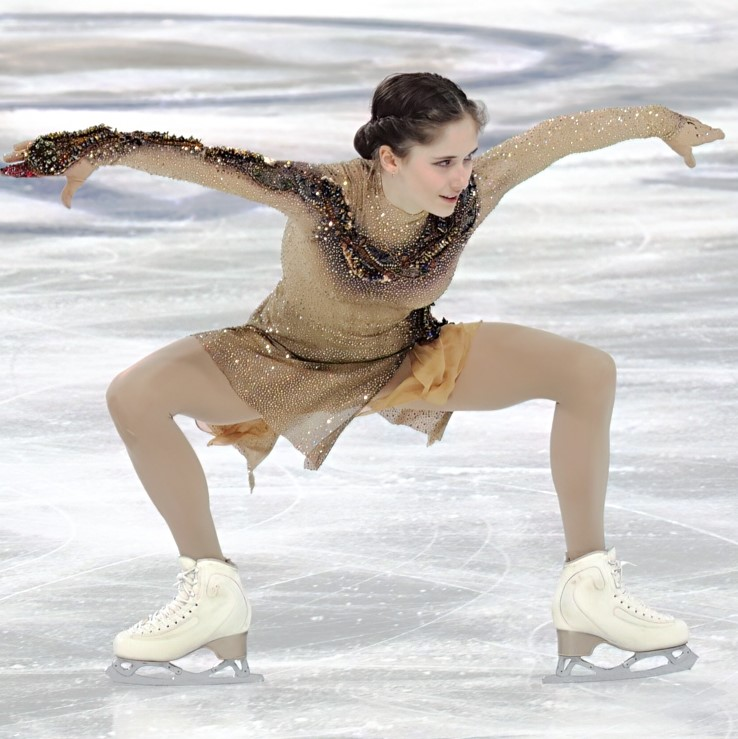
Levito performing a Besti squat during her short program at the 2023 Grand Prix de France

Beginning the season at the 2023 CS Nebelhorn Trophy, Levito won the gold medal. She was invited to participate in the Japan Open as part of Team North America, and finished third in the women's competition, while the team finished second overall.

Levito began the Grand Prix at the 2023 Skate America, where she finished narrowly third in the segment, 1.38 points behind second-place Amber Glenn. In the free skate she was second, and rose to second place overall, winning her second consecutive silver medal at Skate America. She professed to be "a little disappointed" with some aspects of the performance, saying "my programs have a lot more potential this season."

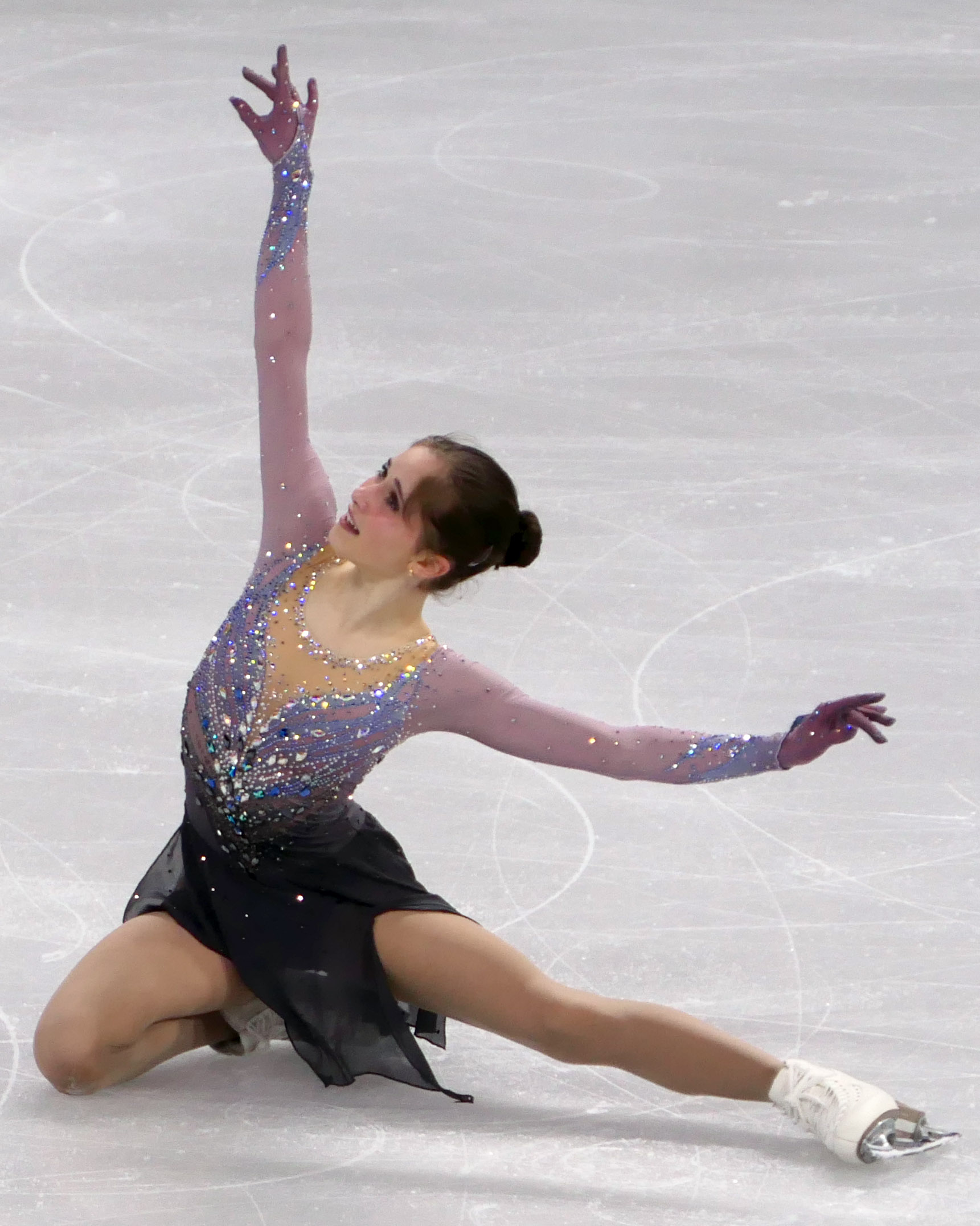
Levito finishing her short program at the 2024 World Championships

She won the short program at the 2023 Grand Prix de France, her second event, by a margin of 5.10 points over second-place Anastasiia Gubanova. She faltered in the free skate, with two difficult jump landings and a fall out of her closing spin, as a result placing third in that segment, but her short program lead was enough to keep her in first place over Belgium's Nina Pinzarrone. She won her first Grand Prix gold medal, and said that she was "proud I was able to improve result-wise from the last Grand Prix season." This was the first Grand Prix victory for an American woman since Ashley Wagner in 2016, and Levito was the youngest American woman to win a Grand Prix since Sarah Hughes in 2001.

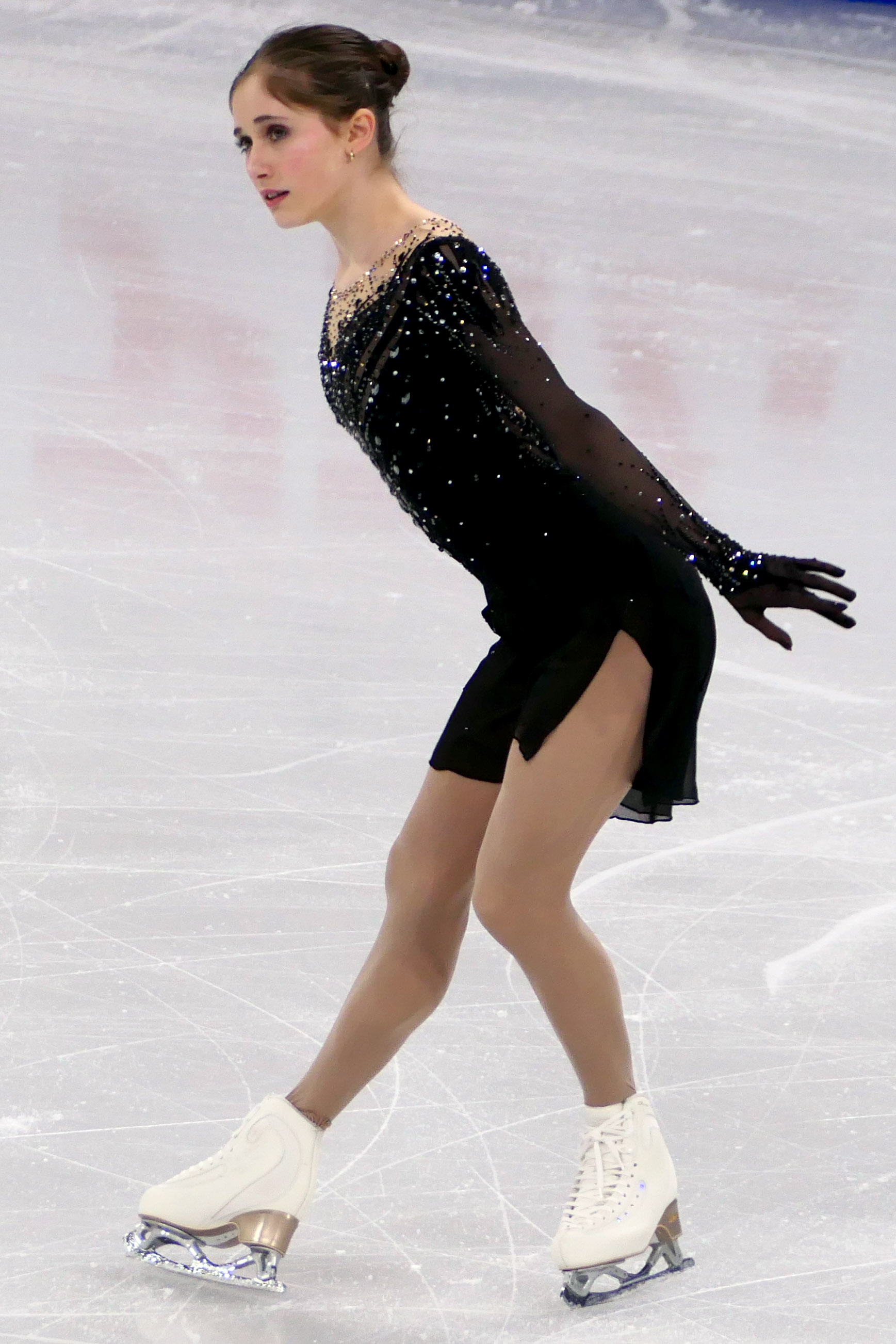
Levito during her free skate at the 2024 World Championships

As the 2023–24 Grand Prix Final approached, Levito described herself as "a little bit sick," though claiming after a last-place short program with errors on all of her jumping passes that "in general nothing is really wrong." She rallied in the free skate, coming third in that segment, and rising to fifth overall.

Following the disappointment at the Grand Prix Final, Levito and her coaches opted to create a new short program, set to "Nella Fantasia", later explaining that she had been disappointed with how her first snake-themed program had developed. Entering the 2024 U.S. Figure Skating Championships as a title favorite, she won the short program with a mostly successful skate, but for a loss of balance in her final spin that cost her a level on the element. In the free skate, Levito fell three times and came fourth in that segment. She finished third overall, behind Amber Glenn and Josephine Lee. She described the evening as feeling "like a fever dream." She had previously not been assigned to the Four Continents Championships.

Two months later, at the 2024 World Championships in Montreal, Levito finished second in the short program with a personal best score of 73.73 points. She said that she was "satisfied" with the performance. She came second in the free skate segment as well and won the silver medal. “I had two goals coming into this world championships,” she said. “Getting on the podium and securing the third spot for the American women next year. I did both." This was her first World medal, and the first World silver for an American woman since Ashley Wagner in 2016. Levito described herself as "content with this way to end the season," saying "I feel like I had a very rough season, and I was so disappointed in myself for a lot of the season. I was so confused with how I was skating, but I'm proud of myself and my team of coaches, with all the consistent training and hard training we've been doing."

=== 2024–25 season: Struggles with injury, Grand Prix medal ===
Levito started the season by competing on the 2024–25 ISU Challenger Series. She won the bronze medal at the 2024 CS Cranberry Cup International behind fellow Americans Sarah Everhardt and Elyce Lin-Gracey. Following that competition, Levito decided to scrap her "Swan Lake" short program and created a new short program created to the music of "Moon River." At the 2024 CS Nebelhorn Trophy, she placed fifth in the short program and second in the free skate, finishing second place overall behind Elyce Lin-Gracey.

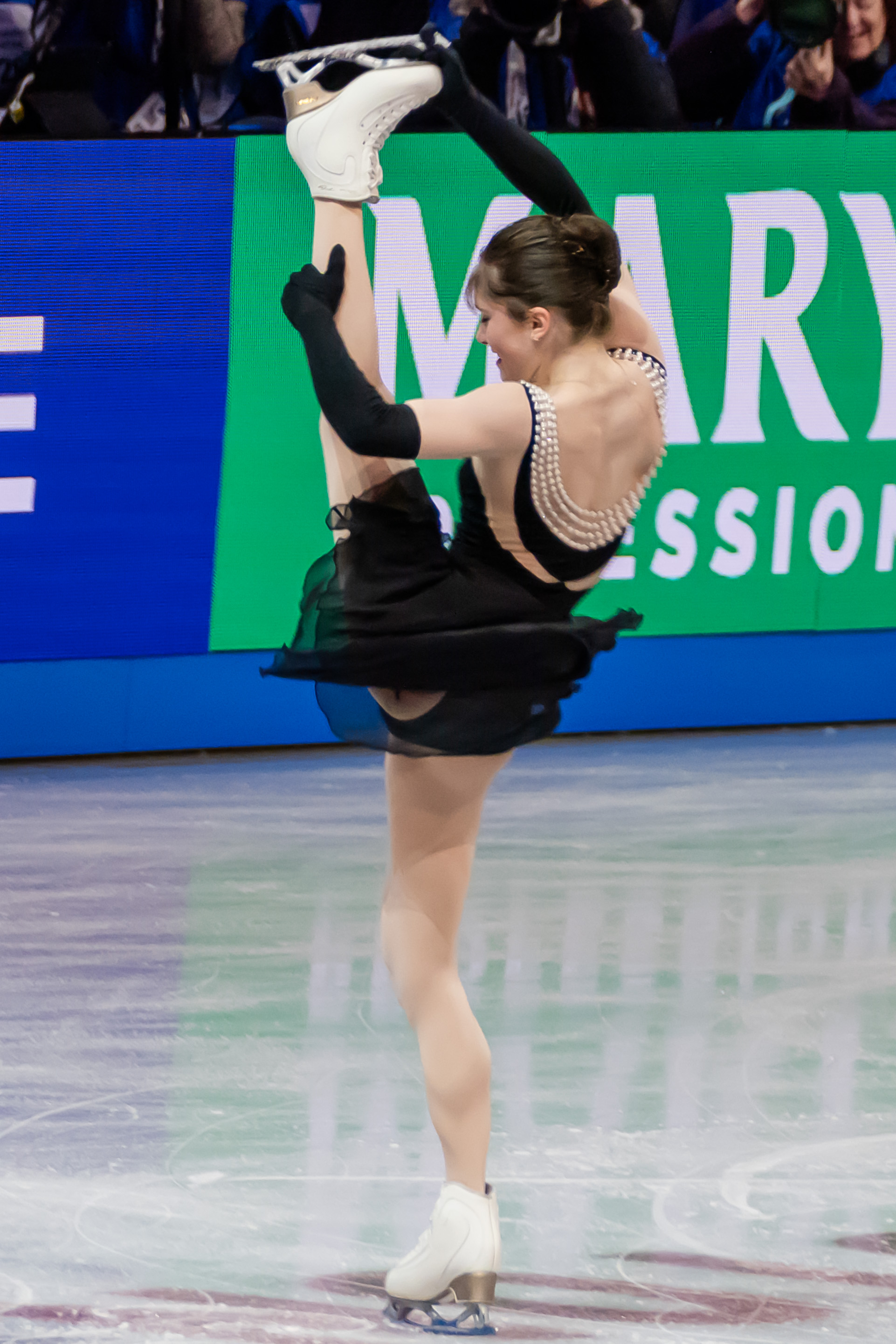
Levito performing an I-spin during her short program at the 2025 World Championships

Going on to compete on the 2024–25 Grand Prix series, Levito competed at 2024 Skate America. She won the event's short program and placed fifth in the free skate after under rotating two jumps which included a fall. Ultimately, Levito finished on the podium, winning the bronze medal. Following the competition, Levito expressed satisfaction, saying, "I think I could have done better today, but I am glad for the elements that worked out and I am happy I am on the podium." Although Levito was also assigned to compete at the 2024 Finlandia Trophy, she withdrew two weeks before the event was set to take place.

Levito withdrew from the 2025 U.S. Figure Skating Championships a week before the event, citing a foot injury, though she still hoped to be named to the 2025 World Championships team. On January 25, it was announced she had been named to the 2025 World team, pending Return to Play Protocol.

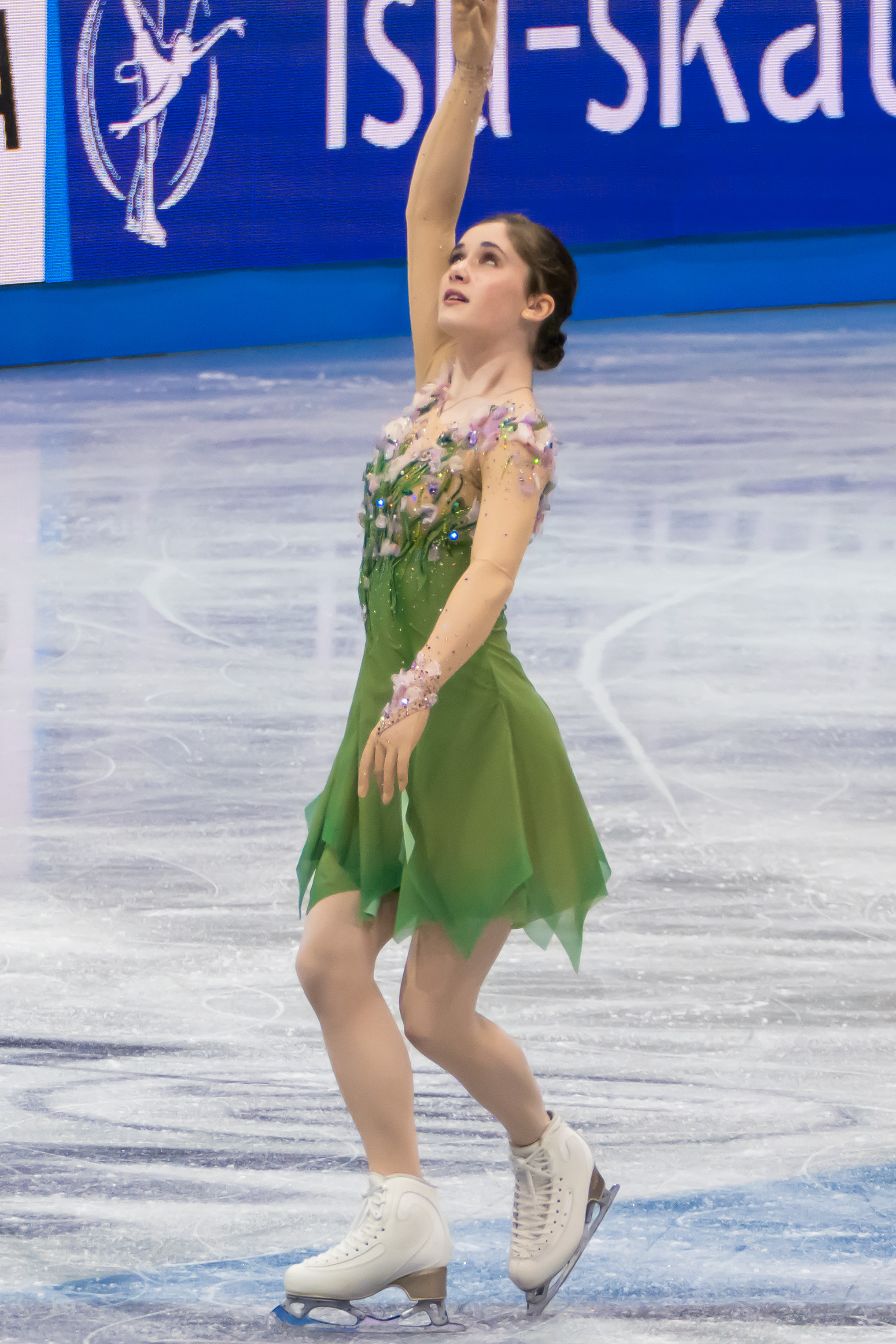
Levito during the free skate at the 2025 World Championships

She returned to competition in February at the Road to 26 Trophy in Milan, Italy, which served as a test event for the 2026 Winter Olympics. In the short program, she finished in second place and landed a triple-double jump combination. Afterward, Levito said that while her right foot had fully healed, it still felt weaker as she had not been able to train with it while healing. She also said that while she had hoped she could attempt a more difficult triple-triple combination in her program, she was not quite ready to do so yet as she had only resumed training jumps three weeks previously. In the free program, she received edge calls and underrotation calls on several of her jumps but remained in second place overall. Following the event, Levito's spot on the 2025 World team was made official.

On March 2, 2025, Levito took part in Legacy on Ice, an ice show organized by U.S. Figure Skating that paid tribute to lives lost aboard American Eagle Flight 5342. Later in the month, she competed at the 2025 World Championships held in Boston, Massachusetts, United States. Levito skated a clean short program, placing third in that segment. During the free skate, although she fell on the second part of her opening triple flip-triple toe combination attempt, she managed to skate the remainder of the program cleanly aside from landing a planned triple lutz on the quarter. Although Levito scored a season's best free skate and combined total score, she only placed fifth in the free skate segment and ended up dropping to fourth place overall.

In an interview following the event, she said, "After that initial mistake, I wanted to leave the ice, but I kept fighting. I'm so glad I kept pushing through each element. What I always remember is that in 2014, when Yuzuru Hanyu first won the Olympics, he fell a couple of times during his skate, but he didn't ever give up and in the end, still won. So I'm always thinking, what if he would have given up? That's what I always think, and I'm so glad I kept fighting until the very end."

=== 2025–26 season: Milano Cortina Olympics and Grand Prix medal ===
Levito began the season by competing on the 2025–26 ISU Challenger Series, winning the gold medal at the 2025 CS Cranberry Cup International and placing fourth at the 2025 CS Nebelhorn Trophy.

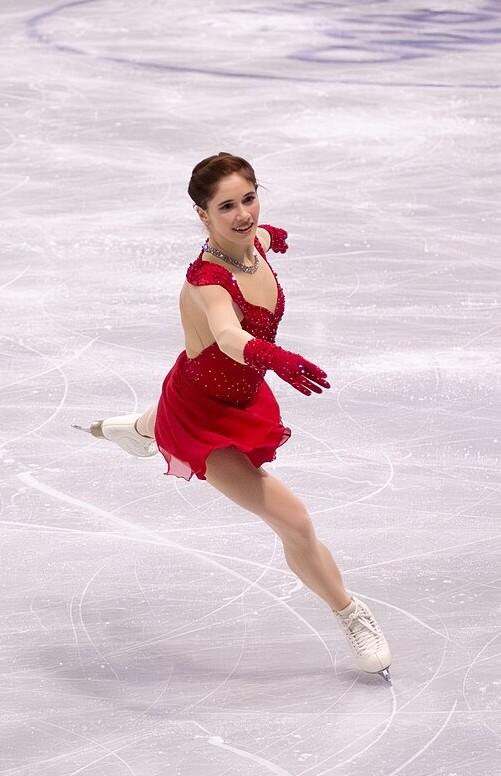
Levito during her short program at 2025 Skate Canada International

At the 2025 Grand Prix de France, Levito placed third in the short program with a season's best score. She explained that she prefers to begin her Grand Prix season with events scheduled close together, and noted that she had recently changed her boots. She said: "It gives me a little break to focus and concentrate on the next competitions coming up. I also have great memories of this event from two seasons ago." She finished fourth in both the free skate and the overall standings.

Two weeks later, Levito earned the silver medal at 2025 Skate Canada International. "I felt very relaxed and at home today, and I was just very hopeful that it would translate to the ice," she said after the free skate. "I feel like I did very well today, and I'm satisfied with my performance, so I'm just very happy." With her Grand Prix series results, Levito was named as the first alternate to the 2025–26 Grand Prix Final.

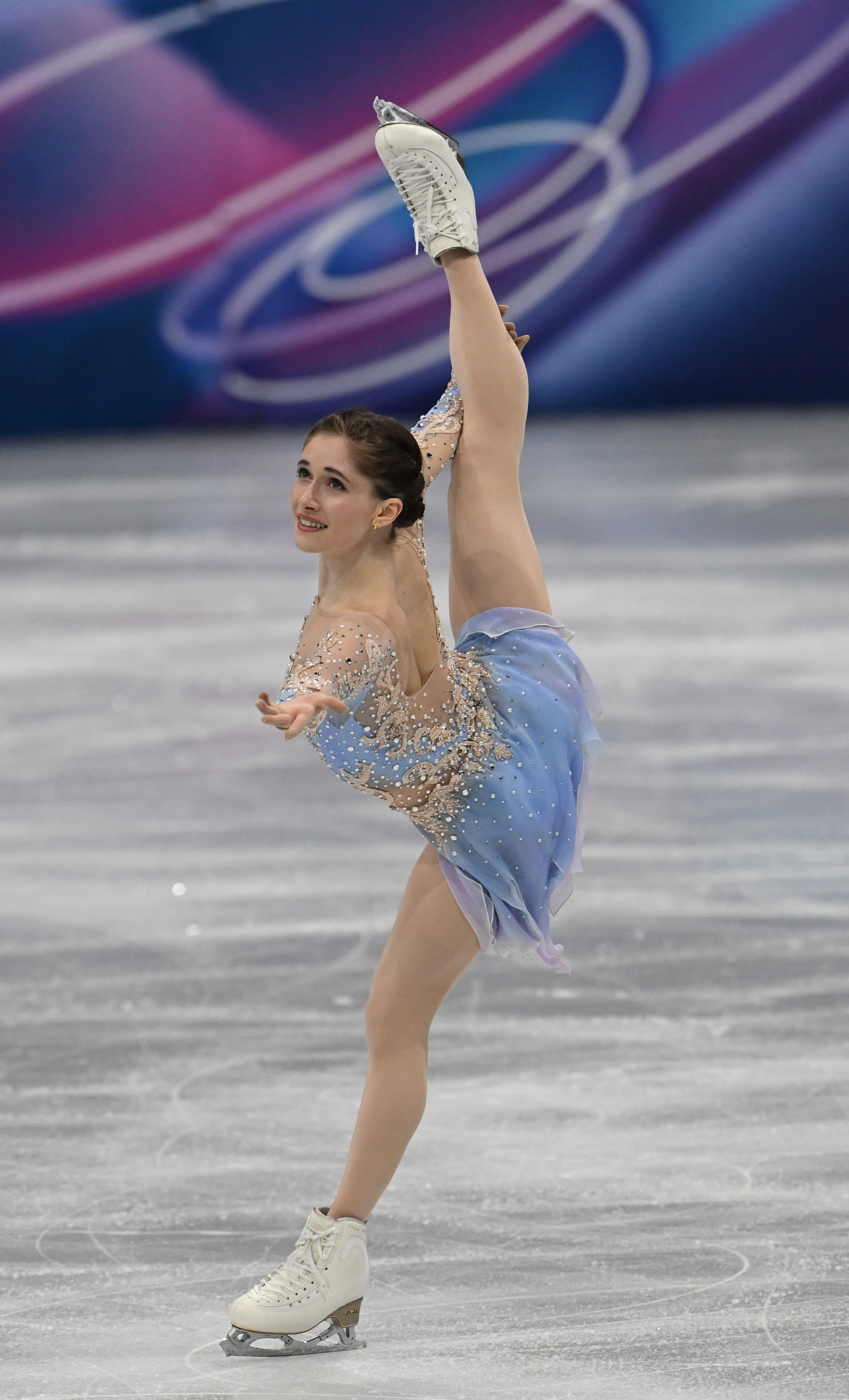
Levito performing a Kerrigan spiral during her free skate at the 2026 Winter Olympics

In January, Levito competed at the 2026 U.S. Championships, winning the bronze medal behind Amber Glenn and Alysa Liu. "I'm really glad that I was able to just rely on my training to get me through the program with no big problems or anything," she said after the free skate. "So, I'm just happy." She was subsequently named to the 2026 Winter Olympic team.

On 17 February, Levito competed in the short program segment at the 2026 Winter Olympics, finishing in eighth in that segment after her triple loop jump was called as being landed on the quarter. Two days later, Levito struggled throughout her free skate, falling on her opening triple flip jump, having three jumps called as being landed on the quarter, and failing to perform a triple-triple combination. She placed thirteenth in that segment and dropped to twelfth place overall. "I kind of just skated, so I'm not so sure how I feel about how I skated," she said in an interview following her performance. "I feel strong right now. I don't feel too tired, and for the most part, I'm not going to frown at the Olympics, so I think that's why I'm smiling... This has been like a fantasy. I really love being here. Living in the village feels like being on a university campus, which is new to me... Getting to be here with friends and meeting new people from different sports has been a wonderful experience. It feels like once in a lifetime because I’ve never experienced something like this before. And I don't have a bad thing to say about it."

The following month, Levito competed at the 2026 World Championships in Prague, Czech Republic. She placed fourth in the short program but dropped to seventh in the free skate, finishing in fourth place overall. "Given my consistency, it's okay," said Levito about her placement. "I'm fourth at Worlds, which is still a very good accomplishment. I don't really feel tired. I still feel somewhat happy."

=== 2026–27 season: Two Grand Prix medals ===
During the off season, Levito shared that she had been struggling with an injury which prevented her from jumping for four months. She opted to not compete on the early ISU Challenger Series events and instead begun her season at the 2026 Skate Canada International. Competing at Skate Canada in October, Levito placed second in the short program, earning a new personal best score of 78.50 in that segment. She subsequently dropped to third overall following her free program where she singled an intended triple Lutz jump. Levito came away with a bronze medal, placing behind Niina Petrokina of Estonia, and Mao Shimada of Japan. “I felt really nervous before this skate,” she said after the free skate. “I’m disappointed, because I didn’t expect these mistakes. I guess I just need to do more practice at home and get more mileage.”

Subsequently, Levito competed at the 2026 Finlandia Trophy. She placed sixth in the short program after under rotating her triple Loop in her combination jump. Following an almost clean free program, Levito rose to third place overall and secured the bronze medal. “I might change the layout of my free skate a little and make it more challenging,” Levito said after the event. “I hope I can do that, and my goal is to skate perfectly at Nationals.”

== Honors and awards ==
- ISU Skating Awards 2023: Best Newcomer

== Programs ==
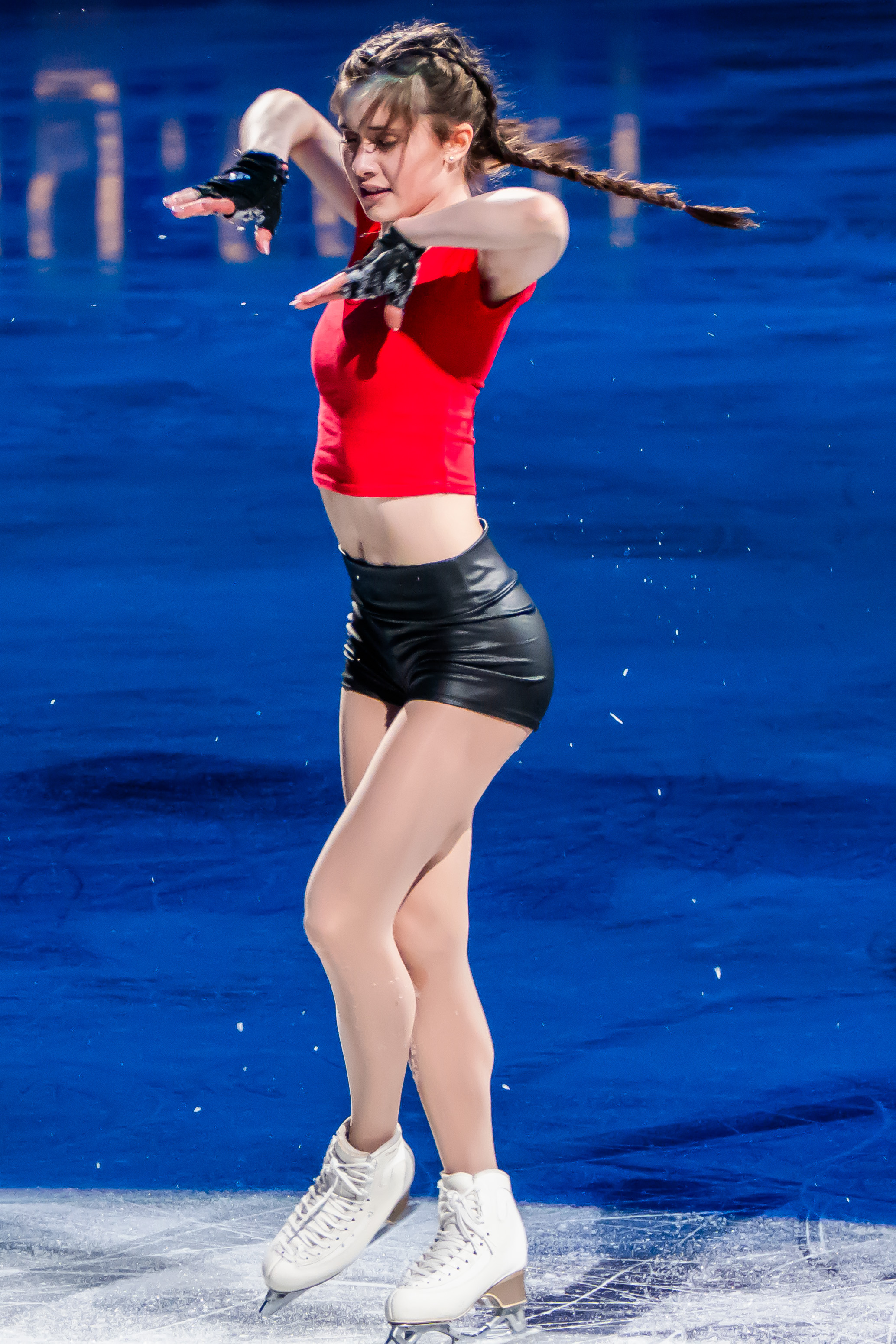
Levito performing a spin in the gala at the 2025 World Championships

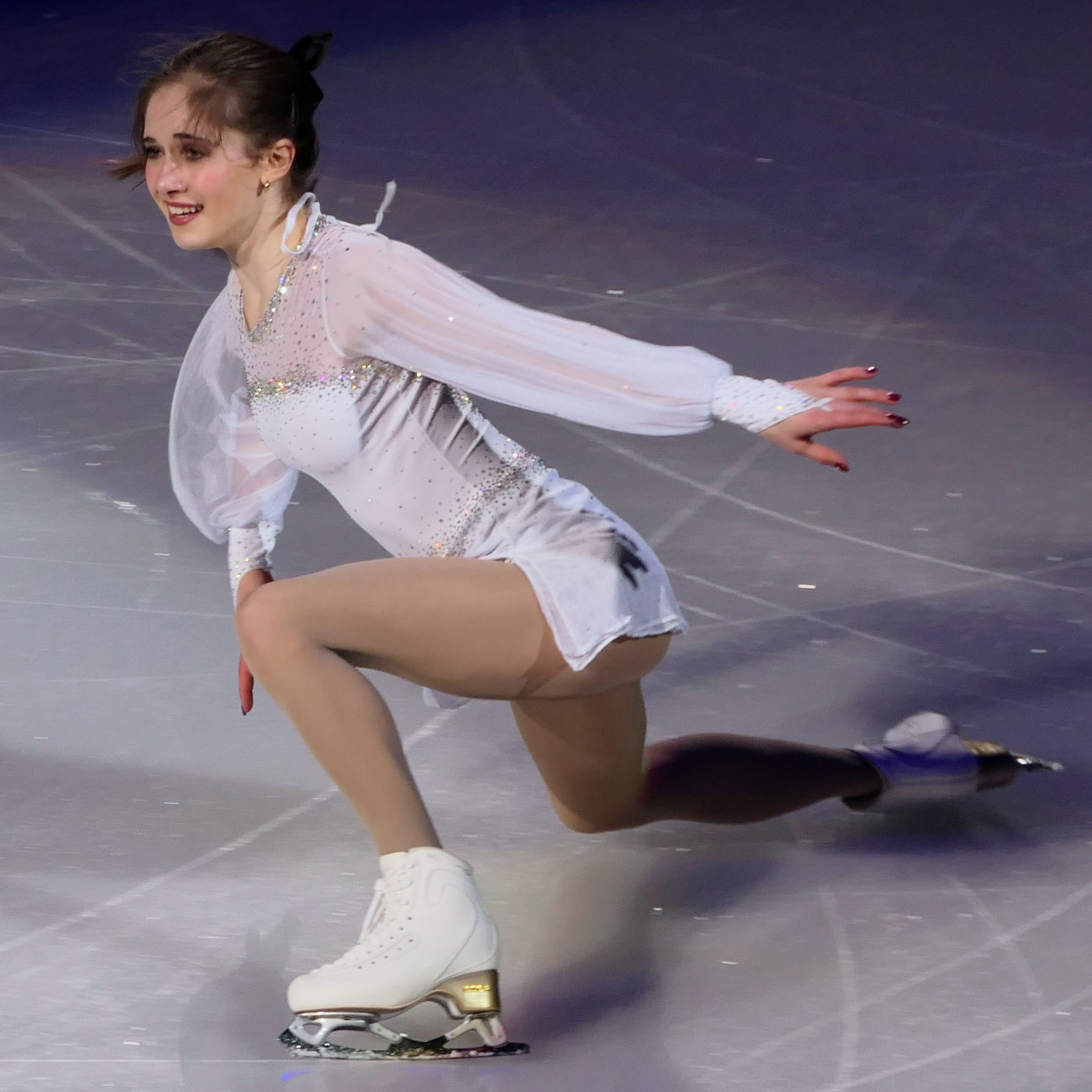
Levito during the Gala at the 2024 World Championships

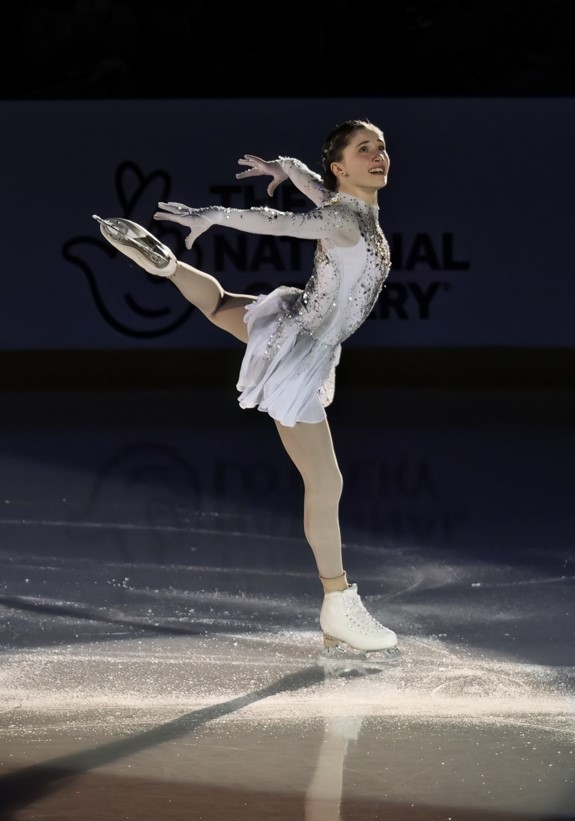
Levito performing her exhibition program at the 2022 MK John Wilson Trophy

Competition and exhibition programs by season
Season	Short program	Free skate program	Exhibition program
2019–20	"Perhaps, Perhaps, Perhaps": Composed by Osvaldo Farrés; Performed by Doris Day; Choreo. by Yulia Kuznetsova	"Malagueña": Composed by Ernesto Lecuona; Choreo. by Yulia Kuznetsova	—N/a
2020–21	"Perhaps, Perhaps, Perhaps"	"Malagueña"	—N/a
2021–22	"The Swan": Composed by Camille Saint-Saëns; Performed by Joshua Bell; Choreo. by Yulia Kuznetsova	"Russian Dance": From Swan Lake; Composed by Pyotr Ilyich Tchaikovsky	—N/a
2022–23	"Una noche más": Composed by Yasmin Levy; Choreo. by Yulia Kuznetsova	"Dulcea Și Tandra Mea Fiară": Composed by Eugen Doga,Victoria Demici; Performed by Cătălina Cărăuș; Choreo. by Yulia Kuznetsova	"The Swan"
2023–24	"Yearning": Composed by Raul Ferrando; Choreo. by Yulia Kuznetsova	"Nureyev": From The White Crow; Composed by Ilan Eshkeri; Performed by Lisa Batiashvili; Choreo. by Yulia Kuznetsova	"Salvatore": Performed by Lana Del Rey
2023–24	"Yearning": Composed by Raul Ferrando; Choreo. by Yulia Kuznetsova	"Nureyev": From The White Crow; Composed by Ilan Eshkeri; Performed by Lisa Batiashvili; Choreo. by Yulia Kuznetsova	"Love": Performed by Lana Del Rey
2023–24	"Yearning": Composed by Raul Ferrando; Choreo. by Yulia Kuznetsova	"Nureyev": From The White Crow; Composed by Ilan Eshkeri; Performed by Lisa Batiashvili; Choreo. by Yulia Kuznetsova	"Material Girl": Performed by Madonna
2023–24	"Nella Fantasia": Composed by Ennio Morricone; Performed by Jackie Evancho; Choreo. by Yulia Kuznetsova	—N/a	—N/a
2024–25	Swan Lake: Composed by Pyotr Ilyich Tchaikovsky; Choreo. by Yulia Kuznetsova & Otar Japaridze	"Liebesträume (Rêve d'amour)": Composed by Franz Liszt; Choreo. by Yulia Kuznetsova & Otar Japaridze	"Histoire d'un amour": Performed by Hélène Ségara
2024–25	Swan Lake: Composed by Pyotr Ilyich Tchaikovsky; Choreo. by Yulia Kuznetsova & Otar Japaridze	"Liebesträume (Rêve d'amour)": Composed by Franz Liszt; Choreo. by Yulia Kuznetsova & Otar Japaridze	"Moon River"
2024–25	"Moon River": From Breakfast at Tiffany's; Composed by Henry Mancini; Choreo. by Yulia Kuznetsova & Otar Japaridze	—N/a	"Fever": Performed by Beyoncé
2024–25	"Moon River": From Breakfast at Tiffany's; Composed by Henry Mancini; Choreo. by Yulia Kuznetsova & Otar Japaridze	—N/a	"Yearning"
2025–26	"Sophia Loren Medley": 1. Almost in Your Arms; From Houseboat; Composed by Ray Evans, Jay Livingston; 2. Zou Bisou Bisou; From The Millionairess; Composed by Bill Shepherd, Alan Tew; Performed by Sophia Loren; Choreo. by Yulia Kuznetsova & Otar Japaridze	"Se": From Cinema Paradiso; Composed by Ennio Morricone; Performed by Jackie Evancho, 2Cellos; Choreo. by Yulia Kuznetsova & Otar Japaridze	"Moon River"
2025–26	"Sophia Loren Medley": 1. Almost in Your Arms; From Houseboat; Composed by Ray Evans, Jay Livingston; 2. Zou Bisou Bisou; From The Millionairess; Composed by Bill Shepherd, Alan Tew; Performed by Sophia Loren; Choreo. by Yulia Kuznetsova & Otar Japaridze	"Se": From Cinema Paradiso; Composed by Ennio Morricone; Performed by Jackie Evancho, 2Cellos; Choreo. by Yulia Kuznetsova & Otar Japaridze	"Material Girl"
2026–27	"Memória": Performed by Rosalía & Carminho; Choreo. by Lori Nichol & Carolina Kostner	The Umbrellas of Cherbourg: Composed by Michel Legrand	—N/a

== Competitive highlights ==
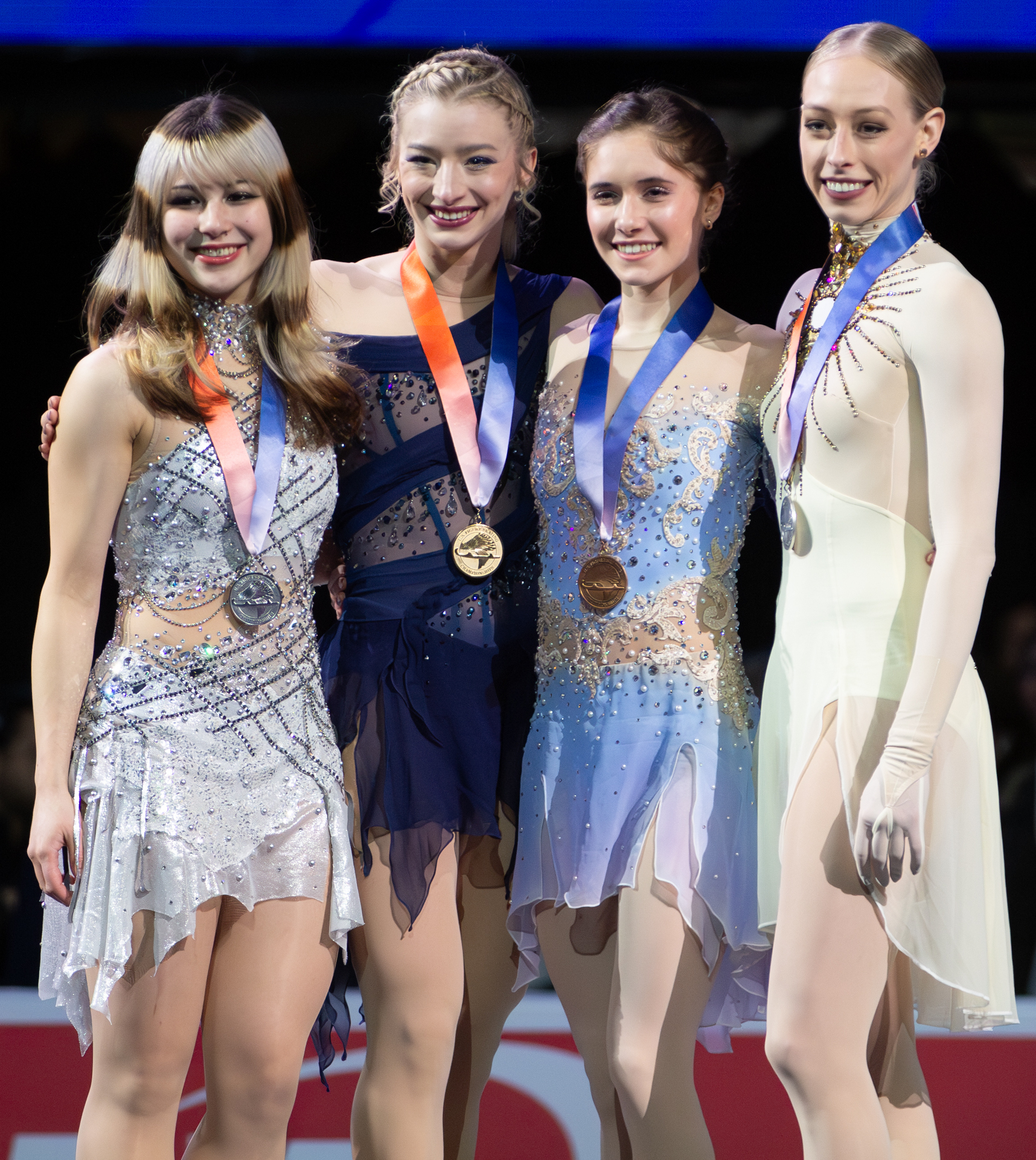
Levito with other figure skaters during the medal ceremony at the 2026 U.S. Championships. From left to right: Alysa Liu, Amber Glenn, Levito, and Bradie Tennell.

- GP – Event of the ISU Grand Prix Series
- JGP – Event of the ISU Junior Grand Prix Series
- CS – Event of the ISU Challenger Series
- TBD – Assigned
- WD – Withdrew from event
- Medals at team events are awarded for the team results only. Individual placements at team events are listed in parentheses.

Competition placements at senior level
Season	2021–22	2022–23	2023–24	2024–25	2025–26	2026–27
Winter Olympics					12th	
World Championships		4th	2nd	4th	4th	
Four Continents Championships		WD				
Grand Prix Final		2nd	5th			
U.S. Championships	3rd	1st	3rd		3rd	
World Team Trophy		1st (3rd)				
GP Finland						3rd
GP France			1st		4th	
GP Skate America		2nd	2nd	3rd		
GP Skate Canada					2nd	3rd
GP Wilson Trophy		2nd				
CS Cranberry Cup				3rd	1st	
CS Nebelhorn Trophy			1st	2nd	4th	
CS Nepela Memorial		1st				
Japan Open			2nd (3rd)			
Philadelphia Summer		1st				
Road to 26 Trophy				2nd		

Competition placements at junior level
Season	2019–20	2020–21	2021–22
World Junior Championships			1st
U.S. Championships	2nd	1st	
JGP Austria			2nd
JGP France			1st

== Detailed results ==
ISU personal best scores in the +5/-5 GOE System
Segment	Type	Score	Event
Total	TSS	215.74	2022 MK John Wilson Trophy
Short program	TSS	78.50	2026 Skate Canada International
Short program	TES	43.59	2026 Skate Canada International
Short program	PCS	34.91	2026 Skate Canada International
Free skating	TSS	143.68	2022 MK John Wilson Trophy
Free skating	TES	74.18	2022 MK John Wilson Trophy
Free skating	PCS	71.03	2025 Skate Canada International

- Small medals for the short program and free skate are only awarded at ISU Championships.
- Medals at team events are awarded for the team results only. Individual placements at team events are listed in parentheses.

=== Senior level ===
Results in the 2021–22 season
Date	Event	SP		FS		Total	
Date	Event	P	Score	P	Score	P	Score
Jan 2–9, 2022	(United States) 2022 U.S. Championships	4	71.00	2	139.75	3	210.75

Results in the 2022–23 season
Date	Event	SP		FS		Total	
Date	Event	P	Score	P	Score	P	Score
Aug 4–7, 2022	(United States) 2022 Philadelphia Summer International	1	70.72	1	136.95	1	207.67
Sep 29 – Oct 1, 2022	(Slovakia) 2022 CS Nepela Memorial	1	65.37	1	133.62	1	198.99
Oct 21–23, 2022	(United States) 2022 Skate America	2	71.30	2	135.36	2	206.66
Nov 3–5, 2022	(United Kingdom) 2022 MK John Wilson Trophy	2	72.06	2	143.68	2	215.74
Dec 8–11, 2022	(Italy) 2022–23 Grand Prix Final	5	69.26	2	127.97	2	197.23
Jan 26–28, 2023	(United States) 2023 U.S. Championships	1	73.78	1	149.55	1	223.33
Feb 7–12, 2023	(United States) 2023 Four Continents Championships	2	71.50	–	–	–	WD
Mar 20–26, 2023	(Japan) 2023 World Championships	4	73.03	5	134.62	4	207.65
Apr 13–16, 2023	(Japan) 2023 World Team Trophy	3	71.22	4	142.65	1 (3)	213.87

Results in the 2023–24 season
Date	Event	SP		FS		Total	
Date	Event	P	Score	P	Score	P	Score
Sep 20–23, 2023	(Germany) 2023 CS Nebelhorn Trophy	1	69.30	2	129.49	1	198.79
Oct 7, 2023	2023 Japan Open	—N/a	—N/a	3	135.63	2	—N/a
Oct 20–22, 2023	(United States) 2023 Skate America	3	70.07	2	138.08	2	208.15
Nov 3–5, 2023	2023 Grand Prix de France	1	71.83	3	131.39	1	203.22
Dec 7–10, 2023	(China) 2023–24 Grand Prix Final	6	56.53	3	135.33	5	191.86
Jan 22–28, 2024	(United States) 2024 U.S. Championships	1	75.38	4	125.30	3	200.68
Mar 18–24, 2024	(Canada) 2024 World Championships	2	73.73	2	138.43	2	212.16

Results in the 2024–25 season
Date	Event	SP		FS		Total	
Date	Event	P	Score	P	Score	P	Score
Aug 8–11, 2024	(United States) 2024 CS Cranberry Cup International	2	65.08	2	128.73	3	193.81
Sep 18–21, 2024	(Germany) 2024 Nebelhorn Trophy	5	61.30	2	136.83	2	198.13
Oct 18–20, 2024	(United States) 2024 Skate America	1	68.43	5	126.40	3	194.83
Feb 19–20, 2025	(Italy) 2025 Road to 26 Trophy	2	66.85	3	121.79	2	188.64
Mar 25–30, 2025	(United States) 2025 World Championships	3	73.33	5	136.51	4	209.84

Results in the 2025–26 season
Date	Event	SP		FS		Total	
Date	Event	P	Score	P	Score	P	Score
Aug 7–10, 2025	(United States) 2025 CS Cranberry Cup International	1	70.69	2	136.92	1	207.61
Sep 25–27, 2025	(Germany) 2025 CS Nebelhorn Trophy	3	71.10	3	136.11	4	207.21
Oct 17–19, 2025	2025 Grand Prix de France	3	73.37	4	139.34	4	212.71
Oct 31 – Nov 2, 2025	2025 Skate Canada International	2	71.80	2	137.97	2	209.77
Jan 4–11, 2026	(United States) 2026 U.S. Championships	3	75.72	2	148.73	3	224.45
Feb 6–19, 2026	(Italy) 2026 Winter Olympics	8	70.84	13	131.96	12	202.80
Mar 24–29, 2026	(Czech Republic) 2026 World Championships	4	72.16	7	134.83	4	206.99

Results in the 2026–27 season
Date	Event	SP		FS		Total	
Date	Event	P	Score	P	Score	P	Score
Oct 30 – Nov 1, 2026	2026 Skate Canada International	2	78.50	6	133.72	3	212.22
Nov 20–21, 2026	(Finland) 2026 Finlandia Trophy	6	67.02	3	140.17	3	207.19

=== Junior level ===
Results in the 2019–20 season
Date	Event	SP		FS		Total	
Date	Event	P	Score	P	Score	P	Score
Jan 20–26, 2020	(United States) 2020 U.S. Championships (Junior)	3	59.18	2	120.29	2	179.47

Results in the 2020–21 season
Date	Event	SP		FS		Total	
Date	Event	P	Score	P	Score	P	Score
Jan 9–20, 2021	(United States) 2021 U.S. Championships (Junior)	1	65.66	1	121.82	1	187.48

Results in the 2021–22 season
Date	Event	SP		FS		Total	
Date	Event	P	Score	P	Score	P	Score
Aug 25–28, 2021	2021 JGP France II	1	71.25	1	131.10	1	202.35
Oct 7–9, 2021	2021 JGP Austria	2	71.32	2	136.99	2	208.31
Apr 13–17, 2022	(Estonia) 2022 World Junior Championships	1	72.50	2	134.05	1	206.55
