= Daniel Grassl =

Italian figure skater (born 2002)

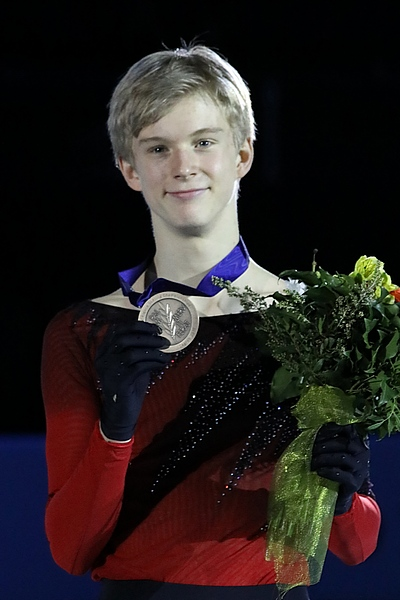
- Daniel Grassl at the 2019 World Junior Championships

Personal information
- Born: 4 April 2002 (age 24) Merano, Italy
- Height: 1.75 m (5 ft 9 in)

Figure skating career
- Country: Italy
- Discipline: Men's singles
- Coach: Edoardo De Bernardis; Luca Mantovani
- Skating club: G.S. Fiamme Oro Moena
- Began skating: 2009
- Highest WS: 5th

Medal record
Olympic Games
Bronze medal – third place	2026 Milano Cortina	Team
European Championships
Silver medal – second place	2022 Tallinn	Singles
Italian Championships
Gold medal – first place	2019 Trento	Singles
Gold medal – first place	2020 Bergamo	Singles
Gold medal – first place	2021 Egna	Singles
Gold medal – first place	2022 Turin	Singles
Gold medal – first place	2025 Varese	Singles
Gold medal – first place	2026 Begamo	Singles
World Team Trophy
Bronze medal – third place	2025 Tokyo	Team
World Junior Championships
Bronze medal – third place	2019 Zagreb	Singles

Daniel Grassl (born 4 April 2002) is an Italian figure skater. He is a 2026 Olympic team event bronze medalist, the 2022 European silver medalist, the 2025 Winter University Games silver medalist, a six-time Grand Prix medalist, an eleven-time ISU Challenger Series medalist, and a six-time Italian national champion (2019–22, 2025-26).

At the junior level, Grassl is the 2019 World Junior bronze medalist, a two-time Italian junior national champion (2016-17), and a three-time ISU Junior Grand Prix medalist.

== Career ==
=== Early years ===
Grassl began learning to skate in 2009. His first coach was Ludmila Mladenova in Merano. He competed internationally in the advanced novice ranks from the 2012–2013 season through 2014–2015.

Making his junior international debut, Grassl won the bronze medal at the Lombardia Trophy in September 2015. He won his first Italian national junior title in December of the same year.

=== 2016–2017 season: Junior Grand Prix debut ===
During the season, Grassl trained in Egna, Italy, coached by Lorenzo Magri. In August 2016, he competed at his first ISU Junior Grand Prix (JGP) assignment in Saint-Gervais-les-Bains. After finishing 7th in France, he had the same result at his next JGP event, in Yokohama, Japan. In December, he repeated as Italy's national junior champion.

In February 2017, Grassl won silver at the European Youth Olympic Festival in Erzurum, Turkey.

=== 2017–2018 season: Senior international debut ===
Coached by Magri, Grassl began his season on the JGP series, placing 6th in Brisbane, Australia, and then 7th in Egna, Italy. His senior international debut came in late October 2017 at the Golden Bear of Zagreb in Croatia; ranked first in both segments, Grassl outscored British champion Graham Newberry by 13.33 points for the gold medal. During his time in Croatia, he was the youngest skater ever to land a quad Lutz. In November, he stepped onto two more senior international podiums, taking gold at the Ice Challenge in Austria (27.33 points ahead of silver medalist Javier Raya from Spain) and then bronze at the Merano Cup in Italy.

=== 2018–2019 season: First National title; World Junior bronze ===
In August, Grassl won bronze at the ISU Junior Grand Prix in Slovakia. In October, he received the senior gold medal at the Golden Bear of Zagreb after becoming the first European to land a quad loop in international competition. In December, he outscored Matteo Rizzo by 4.48 points to become the Italian national senior champion.

Grassl next competed at his first European Championships, where he placed ninth in the short program and fifth in the free skate, for sixth place overall. As Rizzo won the bronze medal at Europeans, he was assigned to Italy's lone men's place at the 2019 World Championships, whilst Grassl was sent to the 2019 World Junior Championships. He placed third in the short program, winning a bronze small medal, despite a minor error on his triple Axel.

=== 2019–2020 season ===
Grassl began his season on the Junior Grand Prix in Poland, where he won the bronze medal. His second event was the Italian JGP event, held in his home rink, where he won the gold medal, qualifying to the Junior Grand Prix Final. Moving to the senior level Challenger series, Grassl won both the Asian Open and the Ice Star.

At the JGP Final in Turin, Grassl was the lone Italian skater to qualify at either the senior or junior level. Two days before the competition began, his right skate broke, which he attempted to remedy with tape. This proved inadequate in skating the short program, where he placed fifth after missing the second part of his jump combination. Grassl then replaced his skates with only a day's preparation and struggled in the free skate, finishing last among the competitors. Shortly afterward, he won his second consecutive Italian national title.

Returning to the European Championships, Grassl placed eleventh in the short program with multiple errors. Staging a comeback in the free skate, he was second in that segment with a new personal best score and rose to fourth place overall, under two points short of the silver medal.

Grassl placed sixth in the short program at the 2020 World Junior Championships in Tallinn, Estonia. Grassl attempted the quad flip in competition for the first time in the free skate, underrotating both it and his quad Lutz, as well as a triple Axel. He placed third in the segment, winning a small bronze medal, and was fourth overall, 1.74 points behind bronze medalist Petr Gumennik. Grassl was scheduled to make his senior World Championship debut in Montreal, but these were cancelled as a result of the coronavirus pandemic.

=== 2020–2021 season ===
Grassl won the 2020 CS Budapest Trophy and was assigned to make his Grand Prix debut at the 2020 Internationaux de France, but this event was also cancelled as a result of the pandemic.

Grassl won his third consecutive Italian national title in December, after which he tested positive for COVID-19, as a result of which he was off the ice for a month and a half due to quarantine and subsequent concerns about the condition of his heart. Grassl was assigned to compete at the 2021 World Championships in Stockholm, Sweden, where he placed twelfth. Grassl and Matteo Rizzo's placements qualified two berths for Italian men at the 2022 Winter Olympics in Beijing, China. They were both subsequently named to the Italian team for the 2021 World Team Trophy. Rizzo later withdrew due to a positive COVID test, as a result of which Grassl was the lone Italian man in the competition. He was tenth in the short program and seventh in the free skate, while Team Italy finished in fourth place.

=== 2021–2022 season: First Grand Prix medal; Beijing Olympics ===
Grassl began the Olympic season at the 2021 CS Lombardia Trophy on home soil. Fifth, after the short program, he won the free skate and took the gold medal. He then made his senior Grand Prix debut at the 2021 Skate America, where he placed seventh. His second Grand Prix assignment was initially the 2021 Cup of China, but following that event's cancellation, he was reassigned to a special home 2021 Gran Premio d'Italia in Turin. Grassl was second in the short program with a new personal best, dropping to third in the free skate to take the bronze medal overall. This was his first Grand Prix medal at the senior level, and he was the lone Italian medalist at the event. Afterward, he expressed a desire to "thank those people in the crowd who supported me."

Following his Grand Prix success, Grassl won another Challenger medal, silver at the 2021 CS Warsaw Cup. He then won a fourth consecutive Italian national title and was named to the Italian Olympic team.

Assigned to compete at the 2022 European Championships in Tallinn, Estonia, Grassl placed fifth in the short program, seven points behind a trio of Russian skaters in the top three places. He placed second in the free skate, despite both of his triple Lutzes being called for incorrect edges, setting new personal bests in that segment and in total score and taking the silver medal.

Grassl began the 2022 Winter Olympics as the Italian entry in the men's short program of the Olympic team event. He placed fifth in the segment, securing six points for the Italian team. Subsequently, Team Italy did not advance to the second phase of the competition and finished seventh. Grassl next performed his short program in the men's event, coming twelfth. In the free skate, Grassl made only minor errors in a three-quad program, managing a new personal best that saw him fourth in that segment, rising to seventh overall. He deemed it "probably the best of the season."

Grassl concluded his season at the 2022 World Championships in a men's field considerably more open than usual due to the absences of Nathan Chen and Yuzuru Hanyu and the International Skating Union banning all Russian athletes due to their country's invasion of Ukraine. He finished fifth in the short program with a new personal best but dropped to seventh after the free skate.

=== 2022–2023 season ===
In August, before the start of the 2022–23 figure skating season, Grassl announced that he would be leaving Egna, Italy, where he had trained most of his life and relocating to Norwood, Massachusetts to train at The Skating Club of Boston under Alexei Letov and Olga Ganicheva.

Grassl was invited to be part of Team Europe at the Japan Open at the beginning of the season. On the Grand Prix, he placed fourth at the 2022 Skate America. He fared better at his second event, winning gold at the 2022 MK John Wilson Trophy, which result in turn qualified him for the Grand Prix Final, becoming the first ever Italian male figure skater to do so. A week later, he competed at the 2022 CS Warsaw Cup and won the silver medal, finishing less than half a point behind event champion Kévin Aymoz.

Shortly before the Grand Prix Final, Grassl announced that he had moved back to Egna to train due to homesickness. At the Final, Grassl finished in sixth place after placing fourth in the short program and fifth in the free skate. At the Italian championships shortly afterward, he finished in fourth place, missing the podium for the first time in five years. In the aftermath of these disappointments, Grassl began training in Moscow with Russian coach Eteri Tutberidze. He would later say that he was finding it difficult to motivate himself to train after the Olympics, feeling that his time in Moscow had assisted him, but that he felt under pressure as "many people are against me and my decision" to train with Tutberidze.

Competing at the 2023 European Championships despite his fourth-place finish at the national championships, Grassl finished eighth in the short program after doubling a planned quad Lutz. He fell on his quad Lutz attempt in the free skate, and erred on two other jumps, but still rose to sixth overall. He indicated that he was undecided whether he would return for further training in Russia.

Grassl finished eighth in the short program at the 2023 World Championships. He dropped to fourteenth after the free skate. Grassl then joined Team Italy for the 2023 World Team Trophy, where, despite underrotating the second part of his jump combination, he managed a season's best in the short program and finished sixth in the segment. He was sixth in the free skate as well, while Team Italy finished fourth. He announced plans to travel to the United States for a month to learn new choreography from Benoît Richaud in New York.

=== 2023–2024 season: Suspension from competition ===
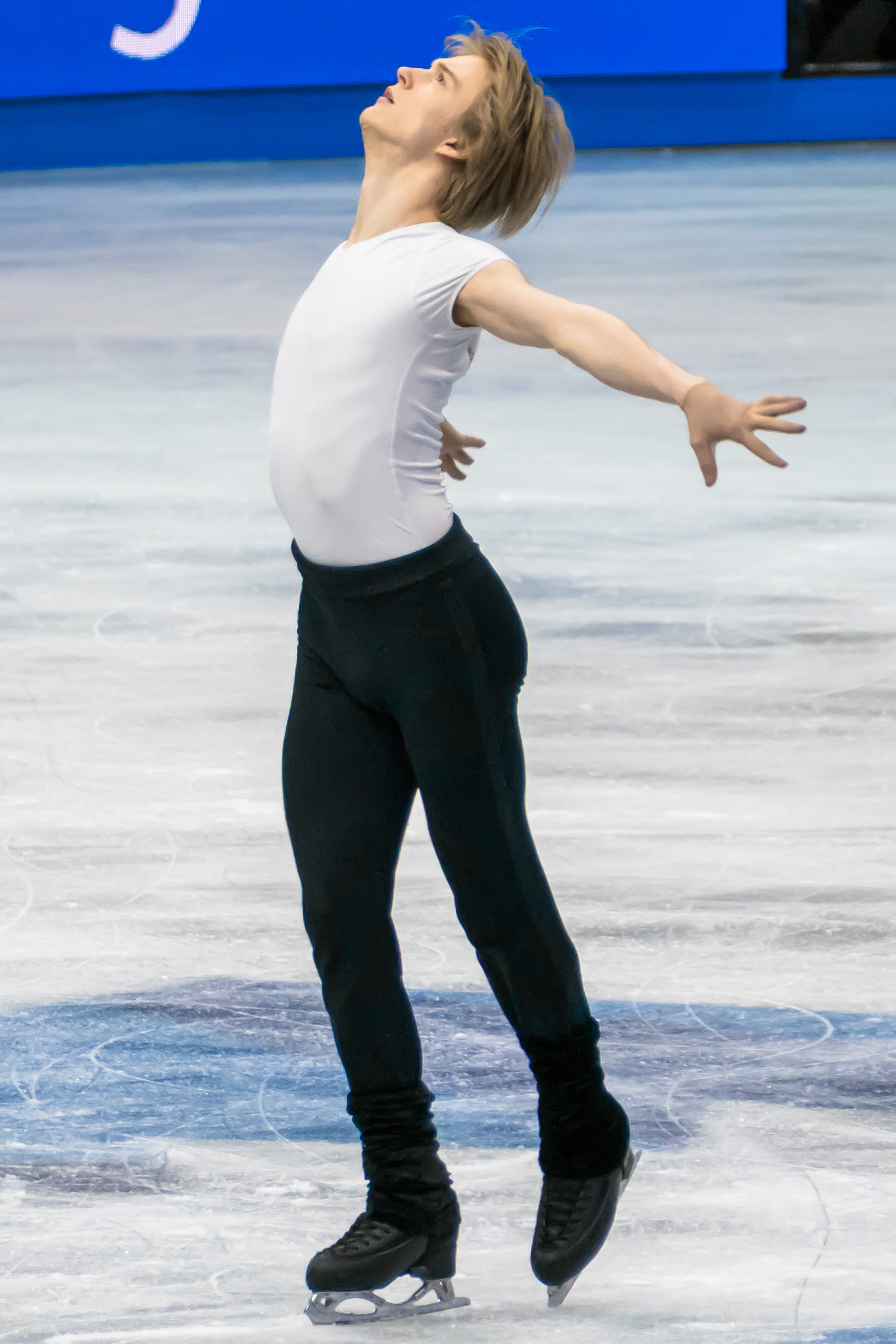
Grassl during his free skate at the 2025 World Figure Skating Championships

Grassl withdrew from his planned events and did not compete during the 2023–2024 season. In September, he returned to Italy and began training with Edoardo De Bernardis. In December, it was reported that the Italian Anti-Doping Prosecutor's Office had requested a two-year suspension for Grassl, as he had missed three anti-doping control tests. Grassl said that he had made unintentional mistakes in updating his location in the system for anti-doping testing.

=== 2024–2025 season: Return to competition ===
Grassl medaled at both his Grand Prix events: 2024 NHK Trophy and 2024 Finlandia Trophy, taking a silver and bronze, respectively. He qualified for the 2024–25 Grand Prix of Figure Skating Final where he finished fourth. Grassl said that he didn’t have any expectations coming into this event. “I was just surprised and happy to be here and that was the main thing for me,” he said. “Being here was already a big goal.”

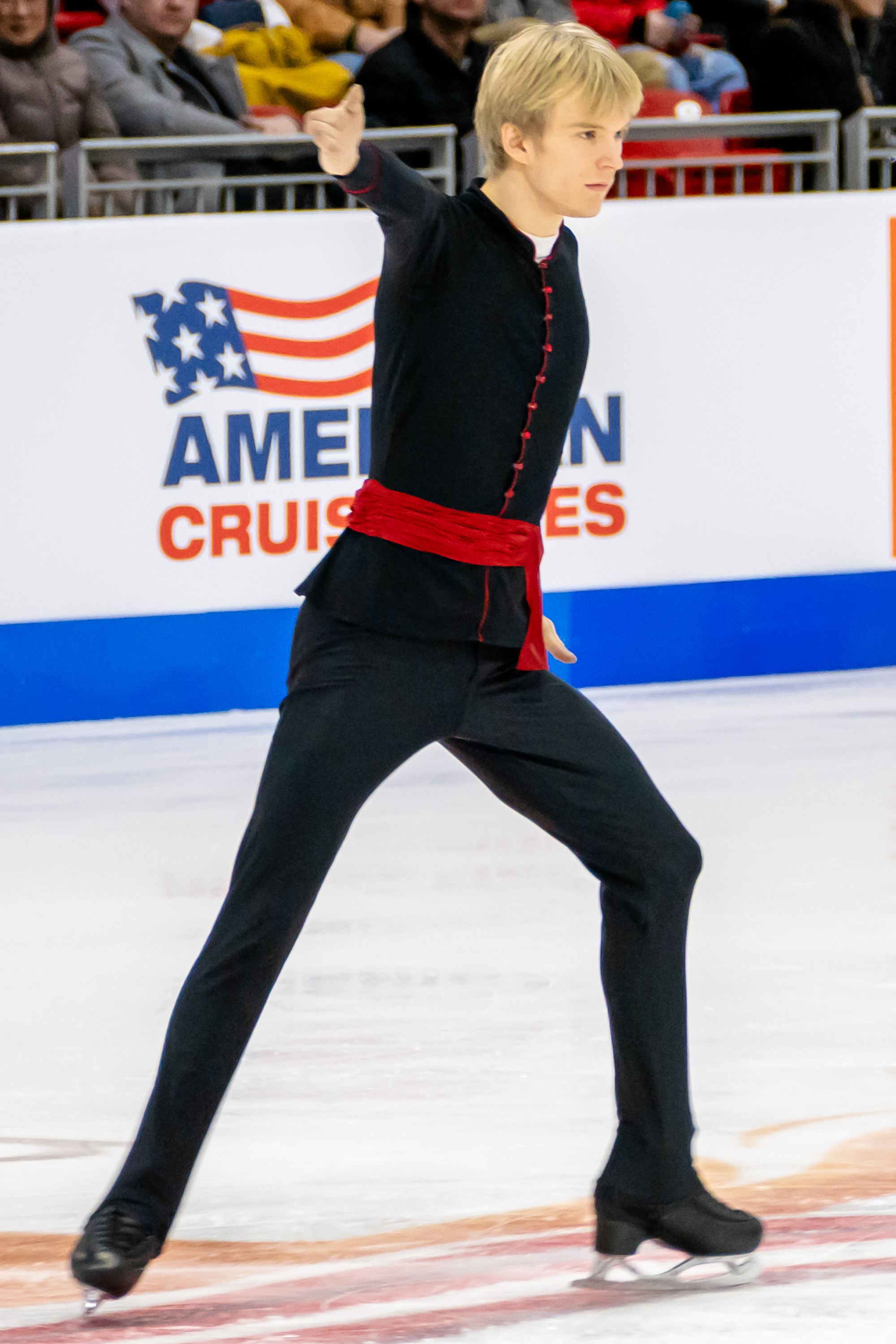
Grassl during his free skate at the 2025 Skate America

After placing eighth at the 2025 European Figure Skating Championships, he competed at the 2025 World Figure Skating Championships, placing thirteenth.

He capped off his season with the 2025 World Team Trophy where Team Italy finished third, taking the bronze medal. “At this competition I was not so much pressured,” said Grassl. “I felt the team event is really a fun competition, but at the same time, I wanted to end this season because for me it's very long.”

=== 2025–2026 season: Milano Cortina Olympics team bronze ===
Grassl opened his season at 2025 CS Nepela Memorial where he earned the bronze. Later in October, he then competed at 2025 Cup of China, winning the silver medal. "I couldn't wait for it to be over," a nervous Grassl said after the free skate. "But then, once I was on the ice, I really enjoyed the moment." He followed up with a fifth-place win at 2025 Skate America, qualifying for the 2025-26 Grand Prix Final.

At the 2025–26 Grand Prix Final, Grassl placed fourth overall. “I'm feeling really good,” said the 23-year-old after the free skate. “I'm very happy how I performed today. It was like amazing, and I'm very happy about this result. I tried to give my best, and also in the steps I really tried to give everything. So, I'm very happy about this.” He went on to win his sixth national title at the 2026 Italian Championships. He was subsequently named to the 2026 Winter Olympic team.

Grassl later placed 13th overall at the 2026 European Figure Skating Championships after a 15th-place finish in the free skate. “This is not what I worked for, but it's okay,” said the 23-year-old. “I'm just going to work for the next one. This will give me much more motivation to get better and do better at the Olympics.”

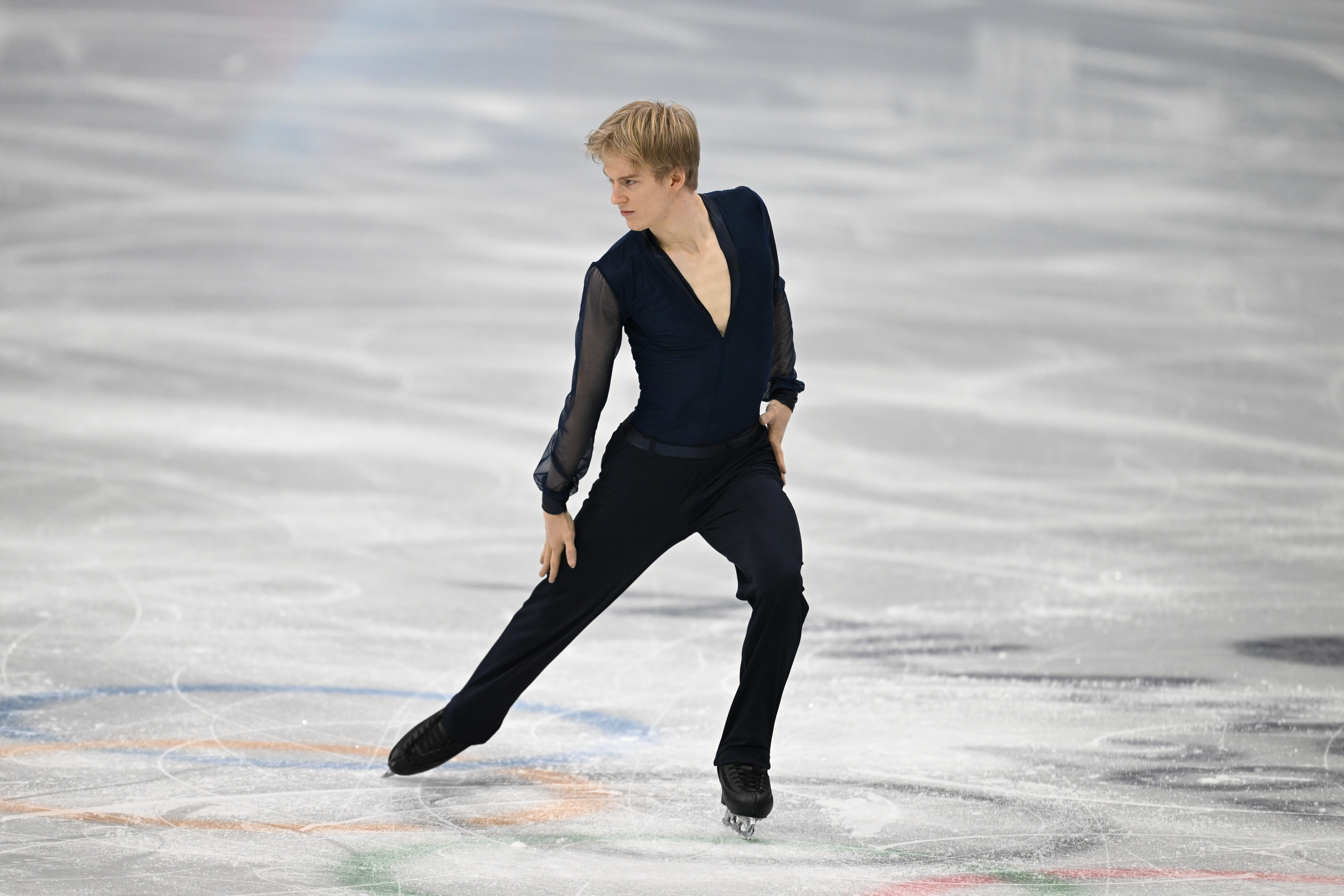
Grassl at the 2026 Winter Olympics

On February 7, Grassl placed fifth in the short program in the 2026 Winter Olympics Figure Skating Team Event. “I'm actually very happy, because skating in the last category is the most pressuring thing,” he said regarding qualifying. “I didn't want to be the black sheep that messes everything up. It was very important because we also know we can fight for a medal."

On February 8, Grassl won a bronze medal at the 2026 Winter Olympics in the team event at the Forum di Milano.

On February 13, Grassl competed in the 2026 Winter Olympics Figure Skating Men's Singles event. He placed fourth in the short program and eighth in the free skate, dropping to ninth overall. "It was very hard today," said Grassl after the event. "Yesterday, I was throwing up all night, so it was very difficult to compete today."

Grassl completed his season at the 2026 World Championships. He placed eighth in short program and ninth in the free skate, finishing eighth overall. After the event, he announced that he would be meeting Pope Leo XIV on April 9.

=== 2026–2027 season ===
Grassl opened his season by winning silver at the 2026 CS Nepela Memorial. He then competed at 2026 Skate America where he placed second after Ilia Malinin for the silver. “I was a little bit stressed, but I trusted my practice,” said Grassl after the free skate. “I’m much more consistent than all the other years.”

== Programs ==
Season	Short program	Free skate	Exhibition	Ref.
2016–17	"Sabre Dance" (from Gayane) By Aram Khachaturian	"Smile" By Charlie Chaplin Performed by Nat King Cole; "City Lights" By Charlie Chaplin	—N/a	
2017–18	"Smile"; "City Lights"	Cirque du Soleil By Benoît Jutras	—N/a	
2018–19	"Rain, In Your Black Eyes" By Ezio Bosso Choreo. by Benoît Richaud	"Dance Pieces" By Philip Glass Choreo. by Benoît Richaud	Mary Poppins By Richard M. Sherman & Robert B. Sherman	
2019–20	"Lacrimosa (Requiem)" By Wolfgang Amadeus Mozart Choreo. by Benoît Richaud	A Single Man By Abel Korzeniowski; Nocturnal Animals By Abel Korzeniowski Choreo. by Benoît Richaud	"Love Is a Bitch" By Two Feet	
2020–21	"Dig Down" By Muse Choreo. by Benoît Richaud	"Joker" By Cédric Tour Choreo. by Benoît Richaud	—N/a	
2021–22	"Nureyev" (from The White Crow) By Ilan Eshkeri Choreo. by Benoît Richaud	Interstellar By Hans Zimmer Arranged by Cédric Tour; "I Don't Want to Miss a Thing" (from Armageddon) By Aerosmith Choreo. by Benoît Richaud	—N/a	
2022–23	"Silhouette" By Aquilo Choreo. by Jason Brown	"Struggling Brain" By Guy Skornik & Zab Skornik; "Korea Town" (from LA 92) By Danny Bensi & Saunder Jurriaans; "Hour of the Ruler" By Joseph Alexander; In The House By Philippe Rombi Choreo. by Benoît Richaud	"I Feel Love"	
2022–23	"I Feel Love" By Donna Summer Performed by Sam Smith Choreo. by Jason Brown	"Struggling Brain" By Guy Skornik & Zab Skornik; "Korea Town" (from LA 92) By Danny Bensi & Saunder Jurriaans; "Hour of the Ruler" By Joseph Alexander; In The House By Philippe Rombi Choreo. by Benoît Richaud	"I Feel Love"	
2024–25	"Nocturne in C-sharp minor" By Frédéric Chopin Choreo. by Benoît Richaud; "Human" By Stefano Lentini & Tom Baxter Choreo. by Edoardo De Bernardis	"Electricity" (from Billy Elliot: The Musical) By Elton John & Lee Hall; "Gnossienne No. 1" By Erik Satie; "Arabesque No. 1" By Claude Debussy; "Born to Boogie" (from Billy Elliot: The Musical) by Elton John & Lee Hall; "A Swan Song (For Nina)" (from Black Swan) By Clint Mansell Choreo. by Edoardo De Bernardis	"Too Sweet" By Hozier	
2025–26	Tango per la libertà; "Canto Muto"; "Tango per la libertà"; "Ballata per Enrico"; "Plaza de Mayo" By Stefano Lentini feat. Orchestra Sinfonica Nazionale della RAI Choreo. by Edoardo De Bernardis	Conclave; "Overture of Conclave"; "Soon Enough"; "Second Day"; "Walk Through Rain"; "Tears"; "Postlude of Conclave" By Volker Bertelmann Choreo. by Edoardo De Bernardis	"Children" by Robert Miles; "Far l'amore" by Bob Sinclar & Raffaella Carrà	

== Competitive highlights ==
- GP – Event of the ISU Grand Prix Series
- JGP – Event of the ISU Junior Grand Prix Series
- CS – Event of the ISU Challenger Series
- C – Event was cancelled
- WD – Withdrew from competition
- Medals at team events are awarded for the team result only. Individual placements at team events are listed in parentheses.

Competition placements at senior level
Season	2017–18	2018–19	2019–20	2020–21	2021–22	2022–23	2024–25	2025–26	2026–27
Winter Olympics					7th			9th	
Winter Olympics (Team event)					7th			3rd	
World Championships			C	12th	7th	12th	13th	8th	
European Championships		6th	4th		2nd	6th	8th	13th	
Grand Prix Final						6th	4th	4th	
Italian Championships	4th	1st	1st	1st	1st	4th	1st	1st	
World Team Trophy		6th (11th)		4th (9th)		4th (6th)	3rd (6th)		
GP Cup of China								2nd	
GP Finland							3rd		
GP Italy					3rd				
GP NHK Trophy							2nd		TBD
GP Skate America					7th	4th		5th	2nd
GP Wilson Trophy						1st			
CS Alpen Trophy		1st							
CS Asian Open			1st						
CS Budapest Trophy				1st					1st
CS Denis Ten Memorial							4th		
CS Golden Spin of Zagreb	10th	5th							
CS Ice Star			1st						
CS Lombardia Trophy					1st				
CS Nepela Memorial							1st	3rd	2nd
CS U.S. Classic						WD			
CS Warsaw Cup		1st			2nd	2nd			
Challenge Cup	2nd								
Egna Spring Trophy	1st								
Golden Bear of Zagreb	1st	1st							
Ice Challenge	1st								
Japan Open						3rd (4th)			
Mentor Toruń Cup	1st								
Merano Cup	3rd								
Winter University Games							2nd		

Competition placements at junior level
Season	2014–15	2015–16	2016–17	2017–18	2018–19	2019–20
World Junior Championships					3rd	4th
Junior Grand Prix Final						6th
Italian Championships	4th	1st	1st			
JGP Australia				6th		
JGP Austria					5th	
JGP France			7th			
JGP Italy				7th		1st
JGP Japan			7th			
JGP Poland						3rd
JGP Slovakia					3rd	
Cup of Tyrol		2nd				
Egna Spring Trophy		1st	1st			
European Youth Olympic Festival			2nd			
Golden Bear of Zagreb		1st	1st			
Hellmut Seibt Memorial		3rd				
Leu Scheu Memorial		2nd				
Lombardia Trophy		3rd				
Mentor Toruń Cup		1st	1st			
Merano Cup		1st	2nd			
Santa Claus Cup		1st	1st			

== Detailed results ==
ISU personal best scores in the +5/-5 GOE System
Segment	Type	Score	Event
Total	TSS	288.72	2025–26 Grand Prix Final
Short program	TSS	99.10	2026 CS Nepela Memorial
Short program	TES	57.85	2026 CS Nepela Memorial
Short program	PCS	42.95	2022 World Championships
Free skating	TSS	194.72	2025–26 Grand Prix Final
Free skating	TES	110.86	2025–26 Grand Prix Final
Free skating	PCS	84.08	2022 Winter Olympics

ISU personal best scores in the +3/-3 GOE System
Segment	Type	Score	Event
Total	TSS	207.12	2017 CS Golden Spin of Zagreb
Short program	TSS	68.25	2017 CS Golden Spin of Zagreb
Short program	TES	38.60	2017 CS Golden Spin of Zagreb
Short program	PCS	29.65	2017 CS Golden Spin of Zagreb
Free skating	TSS	138.87	2017 CS Golden Spin of Zagreb
Free skating	TES	79.87	2017 CS Golden Spin of Zagreb
Free skating	PCS	60.12	2017 JGP Italy

- Small medals for the short program and free skating are only awarded at ISU Championships.
- Medals at team events are awarded for the team result only. Individual placements at team events are listed in parentheses.

=== Senior level ===
Results in the 2017–18 season
Date	Event	SP		FS		Total	
Date	Event	P	Score	P	Score	P	Score
Oct 26–29, 2017	(Croatia) 2017 Golden Bear of Zagreb	1	67.27	1	130.91	1	198.18
Nov 9–12, 2017	(Austria) 2017 Ice Challenge	1	72.34	1	137.54	1	209.88
Nov 15–19, 2017	(Italy) 2017 Merano Cup	1	65.55	2	122.82	3	188.37
Dec 6–9, 2017	(Croatia) 2017 CS Golden Spin of Zagreb	10	68.25	10	138.87	10	207.12
Dec 13–16, 2017	(Italy) 2018 Italian Championships	4	74.28	4	142.79	4	217.07
Feb 22–25, 2018	(Netherlands) 2018 International Challenge Cup	7	64.99	1	145.43	2	210.42
Apr 4–8, 2018	(Italy) 2018 Egna Spring Trophy	1	69.36	1	147.63	1	216.99

Results in the 2018–19 season
Date	Event	SP		FS		Total	
Date	Event	P	Score	P	Score	P	Score
Oct 24–28, 2018	(Croatia) 2018 Golden Bear of Zagreb	1	82.42	1	167.95	1	250.37
Nov 11–18, 2018	(Austria) 2018 CS Alpen Trophy	1	83.42	1	147.08	1	230.50
Nov 23–25, 2018	(Poland) 2018 Warsaw Cup	1	82.27	1	135.64	1	217.91
Dec 5–8, 2018	(Croatia) 2018 CS Golden Spin of Zagreb	6	82.35	4	147.47	5	229.82
Dec 13–16, 2018	(Italy) 2019 Italian Championships	1	81.64	2	164.46	1	246.10
Jan 21–27, 2019	(Belarus) 2019 European Championships	9	81.69	5	155.01	6	236.70
Apr 11–14, 2019	(Japan) 2019 World Team Trophy	10	79.68	11	148.68	6 (11)	228.36

Results in the 2019–20 season
Date	Event	SP		FS		Total	
Date	Event	P	Score	P	Score	P	Score
Oct 18–20, 2019	(Belarus) 2019 CS Ice Star	1	85.42	1	158.40	1	243.82
Oct 30 – Nov 3, 2019	(China) 2019 CS Asian Open Trophy	1	77.09	1	152.99	1	230.08
Dec 12–15, 2019	(Italy) 2020 Italian Championships	2	81.53	1	163.87	1	245.40
Jan 20–26, 2020	(Austria) 2020 European Championships	11	76.61	2	168.27	4	244.88

Results in the 2020–21 season
Date	Event	SP		FS		Total	
Date	Event	P	Score	P	Score	P	Score
Oct 15–17, 2020	(Hungary) 2020 CS Budapest Trophy	1	82.27	1	150.77	1	233.04
Dec 12–13, 2020	(Italy) 2021 Italian Championships	1	96.54	1	176.31	1	272.85
Mar 22–28, 2021	(Sweden) 2021 World Championships	15	79.43	10	163.38	12	242.81
Apr 15–18, 2021	(Japan) 2021 World Team Trophy	10	67.32	7	161.56	4 (9)	228.88

Results in the 2021–22 season
Date	Event	SP		FS		Total	
Date	Event	P	Score	P	Score	P	Score
Sep 10–12, 2021	(Italy) 2021 CS Lombardia Trophy	5	74.26	1	173.54	1	247.80
Oct 22–24, 2021	(United States) 2021 Skate America	8	70.88	6	150.55	7	221.43
Nov 5–7, 2021	(Italy) 2021 Gran Premio d'Italia	2	95.67	3	173.33	3	269.00
Nov 17–20, 2021	(Poland) 2021 CS Warsaw Cup	4	81.74	2	161.22	2	242.96
Dec 4–5, 2021	(Italy) 2022 Italian Championships	1	96.66	1	177.30	1	273.96
Jan 10–16, 2022	(Estonia) 2022 European Championships	5	91.75	2	182.73	2	274.48
Feb 4–7, 2022	(China) 2022 Winter Olympics (Team event)	5	88.10	—N/a	—N/a	7	—N/a
Feb 8–10, 2022	(China) 2022 Winter Olympics	12	90.64	4	187.43	7	278.07
Mar 21–27, 2022	(France) 2022 World Championships	5	97.62	7	169.04	7	266.66

Results in the 2022–23 season
Date	Event	SP		FS		Total	
Date	Event	P	Score	P	Score	P	Score
Oct 8, 2022	2022 Japan Open	—N/a	—N/a	4	166.21	3	—N/a
Oct 21–23, 2022	(United States) 2022 Skate America	3	88.43	4	169.25	4	257.68
Nov 11–13, 2022	(United Kingdom) 2022 MK John Wilson Trophy	2	86.85	1	177.50	1	264.35
Nov 17–20, 2022	(Poland) 2022 CS Warsaw Cup	4	76.44	1	181.32	2	257.76
Dec 8–11, 2022	(Italy) 2022–23 Grand Prix Final	4	80.40	5	164.57	6	244.97
Dec 15–18, 2022	(Italy) 2023 Italian Championships	1	90.85	4	129.84	4	220.69
Jan 25–29, 2023	(Finland) 2023 European Championships	8	77.03	5	153.80	6	230.83
Mar 22–26, 2023	(Japan) 2023 World Championships	8	86.50	14	157.93	12	244.43
Apr 13–16, 2023	(Japan) 2023 World Team Trophy	6	89.81	6	173.53	4 (6)	263.34

Results in the 2024–25 season
Date	Event	SP		FS		Total	
Date	Event	P	Score	P	Score	P	Score
Oct 3–5, 2024	(Kazakhstan) 2024 CS Denis Ten Memorial Challenge	6	66.79	1	170.91	4	237.70
Oct 25–27, 2024	(Slovakia) 2024 CS Nepela Memorial	1	90.36	1	176.72	1	267.08
Nov 8–10, 2024	(Japan) 2024 NHK Trophy	5	83.01	2	181.84	2	264.85
Nov 15-17, 2024	(Finland) 2024 Finlandia Trophy	6	77.91	1	180.64	3	258.55
Dec 5–8, 2024	(France) 2024–25 Grand Prix Final	5	81.76	4	173.20	4	254.96
Dec 19–21, 2024	(Italy) 2025 Italian Championships	1	101.25	2	171.04	1	272.29
Jan 16–18, 2025	(Italy) 2025 Winter World University Games	3	93.82	1	186.74	2	280.56
Jan 28 – Feb 2, 2025	(Estonia) 2025 European Championships	10	78.15	5	159.59	8	237.74
Mar 25–30, 2025	(United States) 2025 World Championships	14	80.47	12	161.84	13	242.31
Apr 17–20, 2025	(Japan) 2025 World Team Trophy	7	87.07	3	172.45	3 (6)	259.52

Results in the 2025–26 season
Date	Event	SP		FS		Total	
Date	Event	P	Score	P	Score	P	Score
Sep 25–27, 2025	(Slovakia) 2025 CS Nepela Memorial	2	85.89	3	155.92	3	241.81
Oct 24–26, 2025	2025 Cup of China	2	90.42	2	179.01	2	269.43
Nov 13–16, 2025	(United States) 2025 Skate America	4	83.68	6	152.76	5	236.44
Dec 4–6, 2025	(Japan) 2025-26 Grand Prix Final	4	94.00	2	194.72	4	288.72
Dec 17–20, 2025	(Italy) 2026 Italian Championships	1	108.17	1	174.57	1	282.74
Jan 13-18, 2026	(United Kingdom) 2026 European Championships	5	84.82	15	130.51	13	215.33
Feb 6–8, 2026	(Italy) 2026 Winter Olympics – Team event	5	87.54	—N/a	—N/a	3	—N/a
Feb 10–13, 2026	(Italy) 2026 Winter Olympics	4	93.46	8	170.25	9	263.71
Mar 24–29, 2026	(Czech Republic) 2026 World Championships	8	88.53	9	166.41	8	254.94

Results in the 2026-27 season
Date	Event	SP		FS		Total	
Date	Event	P	Score	P	Score	P	Score
Sep 24-27, 2026	(Slovakia) 2026 CS Nepela Memorial	2	99.10	2	179.70	2	278.80
Oct 15-18, 2026	(Hungary) 2026 CS Budapest Trophy	1	97.14	1	171.70	1	268.84
Nov 13–15, 2026	(United States) 2026 Skate America	4	86.48	1	188.25	2	274.73

=== Junior level ===
Results in the 2014–15 season
Date	Event	SP		FS		Total	
Date	Event	P	Score	P	Score	P	Score
Feb 7–8, 2015	(Italy) 2015 Italian Championships (Junior)	3	49.53	3	93.49	4	143.02

Results in the 2015–16 season
Date	Event	SP		FS		Total	
Date	Event	P	Score	P	Score	P	Score
Sep 17–20, 2015	(Italy) 2015 Lombardia Trophy	5	46.97	3	103.42	3	150.39
Oct 27–31, 2015	(Austria) 2015 Leo Scheu Memorial	4	50.65	2	107.40	2	158.05
Nov 12–15, 2015	(Italy) 2015 Merano Cup	1	54.03	1	109.72	1	163.75
Nov 19–22, 2015	(Croatia) 2015 Golden Bear of Zagreb	1	54.85	1	109.98	1	164.83
Nov 28 – Dec 4, 2015	(Hungary) 2015 Santa Claus Cup	1	60.60	1	110.90	1	171.50
Dec 16–19, 2015	(Italy) 2016 Italian Championships (Junior)	1	59.03	1	110.90	1	169.93
Jan 6–10, 2016	(Poland) 2016 Mentor Toruń Cup	1	56.09	1	111.89	1	167.98
Feb 23–27, 2016	(Austria) 2016 Hellmut Seibt Memorial	6	49.22	1	105.44	3	154.66
Mar 9–13, 2016	(Austria) 2016 Cup of Tyrol	1	53.06	2	100.20	2	153.26
Apr 15–17, 2016	(Italy) 2016 Egna Spring Trophy	1	60.41	1	120.12	1	180.53

Results in the 2016–17 season
Date	Event	SP		FS		Total	
Date	Event	P	Score	P	Score	P	Score
Aug 24–27, 2016	2016 JGP France	8	56.09	7	115.03	7	171.12
Sep 8–11, 2016	2016 JGP Japan	10	56.10	7	121.26	7	177.36
Oct 27–30, 2016	(Croatia) 2016 Golden Bear of Zagreb	2	58.52	1	124.51	1	183.03
Nov 10–13, 2016	(Italy) 2016 Merano Cup	5	54.15	1	122.50	2	176.65
Dec 6–11, 2016	(Hungary) 2016 Santa Claus Cup	1	56.80	1	112.82	1	169.62
Dec 14–17, 2016	(Italy) 2017 Italian Championships (Junior)	1	66.58	1	135.88	1	202.46
Jan 10–15, 2017	(Poland) 2017 Mentor Toruń Cup	1	61.00	1	116.58	1	177.58
Feb 11–18, 2017	(Turkey) 2017 European Youth Olympic Festival	2	63.35	2	114.89	2	178.24
Apr 6–9, 2017	(Italy) 2017 Egna Spring Trophy	1	60.56	1	120.86	1	181.42

Results in the 2017–18 season
Date	Event	SP		FS		Total	
Date	Event	P	Score	P	Score	P	Score
Aug 23–26, 2017	2017 JGP Australia	5	62.35	8	112.58	6	174.93
Oct 11–14, 2017	2017 JGP Italy	8	61.92	6	126.12	7	188.04

Results in the 2018–19 season
Date	Event	SP		FS		Total	
Date	Event	P	Score	P	Score	P	Score
Aug 22–25, 2018	2018 JGP Slovakia	3	71.86	4	127.40	3	199.26
Aug 29 – Sep 1, 2018	2018 JGP Austria	5	70.17	5	121.21	5	191.38
Mar 4–10, 2019	(Croatia) 2019 World Junior Championships	3	81.19	4	143.48	3	224.67

Results in the 2019–20 season
Date	Event	SP		FS		Total	
Date	Event	P	Score	P	Score	P	Score
Sep 4–7, 2019	2019 JGP Poland	3	81.01	3	147.63	3	228.64
Oct 2–5, 2019	2019 JGP Italy	1	82.77	1	158.76	1	241.53
Dec 5–8, 2019	(Italy) 2019–20 Junior Grand Prix Final	5	71.95	6	123.71	6	195.66
Mar 2–8, 2020	(Estonia) 2020 World Junior Championships	6	78.91	3	150.47	4	229.38
