= Bunny the Killer Thing =

- Theatrical poster
- Directed by: Joonas Makkonen
- Written by: Joonas Makkonen, Miika J. Norvanto
- Produced by: Miika J. Norvanto
- Starring: Hiski Hämäläinen; Enni Ojutkangas; Roope Olenius; Gareth Lawrence; Marcus Massey; Veera W. Vilo
- Cinematography: Tero Saikkonen
- Edited by: Joonas Makkonen
- Music by: Jussi Huhtala
- Production companies: Black Lion Pictures; Jo-Jo the Dog Films; Bottomland Productions
- Release dates: 29 May 2015 (Madrid); 6 November 2015
- Running time: 88 minutes
- Country: Finland
- Languages: Finnish, English

Bunny the Killer Thing is a 2015 Finnish slasher comedy film directed by Joonas Makkonen, based on his similarly titled short film. It was first screened at the Marché du Film in Cannes in May 2015, and released to cinemas in Finland on 6 November 2015.

== Plot ==
A man and a woman arrive at what seems to be their vacation house. The man is taken aback when the woman remarks that the door is unlocked. They are soon greeted inside by a masked intruder with a shotgun. The couple tries to flee, but as they open the front door, they are tased by two other masked intruders. As the woman convulses on the floor, the intruder with the shotgun blows her head off.

In the next scene, we see the man waking up in a dingy laboratory chained to an operating table. Two of the now unmasked men are preparing a syringe with a mysterious, viscous silver liquid. A rabbit is seen in a cage in the background. As the men prepare to inject the syringe, the man on the table exclaims “do you know who I am?“ to which one of the captors replies “you’ll be perfect” before injecting the needle into the bound man’s neck.

The man immediately starts to convulse, and then develops incredible strength, breaking free of the chains. He quickly subdues the two men and runs, nearly naked, out into the snow where he incapacitates the rest of the men. He runs off into the snow before stopping, his limbs constricting and contorting as he convulses further - finally collapsing backward into the snow. His eyes pop open before cutting to the opening credits. The opening credits use drawn imagery to imply that the man turned into some large hybrid man-rabbit creature.

The rest of the film centers around a group of Finnish friends, accompanied by three English speaking men, who are heading for a weekend at a cabin in the middle of nowhere. Soon they are attacked by a strange giant creature who appears to be half man and half rabbit and is after anything that resembles female genitals.

== Cast ==
- Hiski Hämäläinen as Tuomas
- Enni Ojutkangas as Sara
- Roope Olenius as Jari
- Gareth Lawrence as Mr. McRain
- Orwi Manny Ameh as Tim
- Jari Manninen as Mise
- Veera W. Vilo as Nina
- Katja Jaskari as Emma
- Olli Saarenpää as Jesse
- Vincent Tsang as Vincent
- Marcus Massey as Lucas
- Henry Saari as police chief

== Reception ==
The film has received mostly negative reviews in Finland. Juho Rissanen wrote in his review for Iltalehti that even though the film was being marketed as being filled with raw violence and sex, the final product seems somewhat lame. In Keskisuomalainen, Marko Ahonen compared the film to a naughty schoolboy joke that is only funny for friends and not for anyone else. Tarmo Poussu noted in his review for Ilta-Sanomat that with little more work on the screenplay, the film could have achieved the success of another Finnish cult film, Jalmari Helander's Rare Exports: A Christmas Tale. Juha Typpö, a self-declared fan of horror and splatter movies, wrote in his review for Helsingin Sanomat that watching the film was a painful experience and felt like a personal insult.

== Awards ==
- Madness Section – Nocturna, Madrid International Fantastic Film Festival (Madrid, Spain) (2015)
- Best Exploitation Film – Arizona Underground Film Festival (Arizona, USA) (2015)
- Best Film (Audience Choice), Funniest Film, Best Visual Effects – Fright Night Theatre Film Festival (Hamilton, Canada) (2016)
