= Kyrsyä – Tuftland =

- Directed by: Roope Olenius
- Written by: Roope Olenius
- Screenplay by: Roope Olenius
- Based on: Kyrsyä by Neea Viitamäki
- Produced by: Roope Olenius, Veera W. Vilo, Miikka J. Anttila, Sergio Uguet de Resayre
- Starring: Veera W. Vilo; Saara Elina; Miikka J. Anttila
- Cinematography: Mikko Peltonen
- Edited by: Pietari Syväjärvi
- Music by: Jussi Huhtala
- Production company: Bright Fame Pictures
- Release date: 9 December 2017 (Other Worlds Austin)
- Country: Finland

Kyrsyä – Tuftland (English: Tuftland) is a Finnish horror film, directed, produced and written by Roope Olenius that was released in 2017. The film stars Veera W. Vilo, Miikka J. Anttila, Saara Elina and Ria Kataja. It is based on a play Kyrsyä by Neea Viitamäki.

== Plot ==
A headstrong textile student tries to overcome her problems by accepting a summer job offer from an isolated and offbeat village of Kyrsyä.

== Cast ==
- Veera W. Vilo
- Saara Elina
- Miikka J. Anttila
- Ria Kataja
- Neea Viitamäki
- Arja Pekurinen
- Ari Savonen
- Janne-Markus Katila
- Mirja Oksanen
- Jari Manninen
- Katja Jaskari
- Enni Ojutkangas
- Sampo Marjomaa
- Matvei Ojansuu
- Jussi Tuomi
- Niina Ylipahkala

== Production ==
The filming of Kyrsyä – Tuftland took place in the summer 2016 in Espoo, Joensuu, Loimaa, Pori and Tampere. The film was Roope Olenius' directorial debut film and a Bright Fame Pictures production.

== Release ==
The film had its World Premiere in Texas, USA at Other Worlds Austin Film Festival on 9 December 2017, where the film won the Best Feature Director award. Olenius also won the First Look Award at Horrorant Film Festival in Athens, Greece. Tuftland was awarded for the Best Narrative Feature at Arizona Underground Film Festival, Best Feature Film at Cinemafantastique International Genre Film Fest in Canada and Best Domestic Feature at Scandinavian International Film Festival in Finland. It got nominations for Best Film at Horrorant Film Festival, Best International Female Actor (Veera W. Vilo) and Best Nordic Feature Film at Västerås Film Festival in Sweden. Altogether, the film played on 25 international film festivals.

The film was released theatrically in Finland by Bright Fame Pictures on 6 April 2018. A DVD and Blu-ray were released on 17 September 2018 in Finland.

Kyrsyä – Tuftland had a limited theatrical release in Greece on 22 November 2018 and USA on 1 March 2019.

A feature length making-of documentary Kyrsyä – Tuftland: From Stage to Screen was released internationally in 2019.
