= 2017 European Figure Skating Championships =

Figure skating competition

- Type: ISU Championship
- Date: 25–29 January 2017
- Season: 2016–17
- Location: Ostrava, Czech Republic
- Host: Czech Figure Skating Association
- Venue: Ostrava Aréna

Champions
- Men's singles: (Spain) Javier Fernández
- Ladies' singles: (Russia) Evgenia Medvedeva
- Pairs: (Russia) Evgenia Tarasova / Vladimir Morozov
- Ice dance: (France) Gabriella Papadakis / Guillaume Cizeron
- Previous: 2016 European Championships
- Next: 2018 European Championships

The 2017 European Figure Skating Championships were held 25–29 January 2017 in Ostrava, Czech Republic. Medals were awarded in the disciplines of men's singles, ladies' singles, pairs, and ice dancing.

== Records ==
The following new ISU best scores were set during this competition:

Event	Component	Skater(s)	Score	Date	Ref
Ladies	Free skate	(Russia) Evgenia Medvedeva	150.79	27 January 2017	
Ladies	Total score	(Russia) Evgenia Medvedeva	229.71	27 January 2017	

== Eligibility ==
Skaters were eligible for the event if they represented a European member nation of the International Skating Union and had reached the age of 15 before July 1, 2016, in their place of birth. The corresponding competition for non-European skaters is the 2017 Four Continents Championships. National associations selected their entries according to their own criteria but the ISU mandated that their selections achieve a minimum technical elements score (TES) at an international event prior to the European Championships.

=== Minimum TES ===
Minimum technical scores (TES)
Discipline	SP / SD	FS / FD
Men	25	45
Ladies	20	36
Pairs	20	36
Ice dance	19	29
Must be achieved at an ISU-recognized international event in the ongoing or preceding season. SP and FS scores may be attained at different events.

=== Number of entries per discipline ===
Based on the results of the 2016 European Championships, the ISU allows each country one to three entries per discipline.

Spots	Men	Ladies	Pairs	Ice dance
3	Russia; Israel	Russia	Russia; Italy; Germany	Russia; Italy
2	Belgium; Czech Republic; France; Italy; Spain	Finland; France; Germany; Italy; Latvia; Sweden	France; Austria; Belarus	France; Great Britain; Slovakia; Denmark; Israel
If not listed above, one entry is allowed.

== Entries ==
National associations began announcing their selections in December 2016. The ISU published a complete list on 4 January 2017:

Country	Men	Ladies	Pairs	Ice dance
Armenia	Slavik Hayrapetyan	Anastasia Galustyan		Tina Garabedian / Simon Proulx-Sénécal
Austria	Mario-Rafael Ionian	Kerstin Frank	Miriam Ziegler / Severin Kiefer	
Azerbaijan	Larry Loupolover			Varvara Ogloblina / Mikhail Zhirnov
Belarus	Anton Karpuk		Tatiana Danilova / Mikalai Kamianchuk	Viktoria Kavaliova / Yurii Bieliaiev
Belgium	Jorik Hendrickx	Loena Hendrickx		
Bulgaria	Nicky Obreykov	Hristina Vassileva		
Croatia	Nicholas Vrdoljak		Lana Petranović / Antonio Souza-Kordeiru	
Czech Republic	Jiří Bělohradský; Michal Březina	Michaela Lucie Hanzlíková	Anna Dušková / Martin Bidař	Nicole Kuzmichová / Alexandr Sinicyn
Denmark				Laurence Fournier Beaudry / Nikolaj Sørensen
Estonia	Daniel Albert Naurits	Helery Hälvin		Katerina Bunina / Germand Frolov
Finland	Valtter Virtanen	Viveca Lindfors; Emmi Peltonen		Cecilia Törn / Jussiville Partanen
France	Chafik Besseghier; Kévin Aymoz	Laurine Lecavelier; Maé-Bérénice Méité	Vanessa James / Morgan Ciprès; Lola Esbrat / Andrei Novoselov	Marie-Jade Lauriault / Romain Le Gac; Gabriella Papadakis / Guillaume Cizeron
Georgia	Moris Kvitelashvili			Tatiana Kozmava / Oleksii Shumskyi
Germany	Paul Fentz	Nicole Schott; Nathalie Weinzierl	Aliona Savchenko / Bruno Massot; Minerva Fabienne Hase / Nolan Seegert	Kavita Lorenz / Joti Polizoakis
Great Britain	Graham Newberry	Natasha McKay	Zoe Jones / Christopher Boyadji	Robynne Tweedale / Joseph Buckland; Lilah Fear / Lewis Gibson
Hungary	Alexander Borovoj	Ivett Tóth		Hanna Jakucs / Daniel Illes
Israel	Oleksii Bychenko; Daniel Samohin; Mark Gorodnitsky	Aimee Buchanan	Arina Cherniavskaia / Evgeni Krasnopolski	Isabella Tobias / Ilia Tkachenko; Adel Tankova / Ronald Zilberberg
Italy	Ivan Righini; Maurizio Zandron	Carolina Kostner; Roberta Rodeghiero	Valentina Marchei / Ondřej Hotárek; Nicole Della Monica / Matteo Guarise; Rebecca Ghilardi / Filippo Ambrosini	Anna Cappellini / Luca Lanotte; Charlène Guignard / Marco Fabbri; Jasmine Tessari / Francesco Fioretti
Latvia	Deniss Vasiļjevs	Angelīna Kučvaļska		Olga Jakushina / Andrey Nevskiy
Lithuania		Elžbieta Kropa	Goda Butkutė / Nikita Ermolaev	Taylor Tran / Saulius Ambrulevičius
Netherlands	Thomas Kennes			
Norway	Sondre Oddvoll Bøe	Anne Line Gjersem		
Poland	Igor Reznichenko	Colette Coco Kaminski		Natalia Kaliszek / Maksym Spodyriev
Russia	Mikhail Kolyada; Alexander Samarin; Maxim Kovtun	Evgenia Medvedeva; Maria Sotskova; Anna Pogorilaya	Ksenia Stolbova / Fedor Klimov; Evgenia Tarasova / Vladimir Morozov; Natalia Zabiiako / Alexander Enbert	Ekaterina Bobrova / Dmitri Soloviev; Alexandra Stepanova / Ivan Bukin; Victoria Sinitsina / Nikita Katsalapov
Romania		Julia Sauter		
Serbia		Antonina Dubinina		
Slovakia	Michael Neuman	Nicole Rajičová		Lucie Myslivečková / Lukáš Csölley
Slovenia		Daša Grm		
Spain	Javier Fernández; Javier Raya	Valentina Matos		Sara Hurtado / Kirill Khaliavin
Sweden	Alexander Majorov	Matilda Algotsson; Joshi Helgesson		
Switzerland	Stéphane Walker	Yasmine Kimiko Yamada	Ioulia Chtchetinina / Noah Scherer	Victoria Manni / Carlo Röthlisberger
Turkey	Engin Ali Artan	Birce Atabey		Alisa Agafonova / Alper Uçar
Ukraine	Ivan Pavlov	Anna Khnychenkova		Oleksandra Nazarova / Maxim Nikitin

=== Changes to initial assignments ===
Announced	Country	Discipline	Initial	Replacement	Reason/Other notes
January 10, 2017	Germany	Pairs	Mari Vartmann / Ruben Blommaert	N/A	Split
January 11, 2017	Luxembourg	Ladies	Fleur Maxwell	N/A	
January 14, 2017	Ukraine	Pairs	Renata Ohanesian / Mark Bardei	N/A	
January 18, 2017	Czech Republic	Ice Dancing	Cortney Mansour / Michal Češka	Nicole Kuzmich / Alexandr Sinicyn	
January 19, 2017	Netherlands	Ladies	Niki Wories	N/A	

== Results ==
=== Men ===
Fernandez won his fifth European title.

Rank	Name	Nation	Total points	SP		FS	
1	Javier Fernández	Spain	294.84	1	104.25	1	190.59
2	Maxim Kovtun	Russia	266.80	2	94.53	2	172.27
3	Mikhail Kolyada	Russia	250.18	4	83.96	3	166.22
4	Jorik Hendrickx	Belgium	242.56	5	82.50	5	160.06
5	Oleksii Bychenko	Israel	239.24	3	86.68	9	152.56
6	Moris Kvitelashvili	Georgia	238.20	10	76.85	4	161.35
7	Deniss Vasiļjevs	Latvia	235.20	6	79.87	6	155.33
8	Alexander Samarin	Russia	230.87	9	77.26	7	153.61
9	Chafik Besseghier	France	227.59	11	76.19	10	151.40
10	Paul Fentz	Germany	225.85	12	72.68	8	153.17
11	Alexander Majorov	Sweden	217.98	7	78.87	12	139.11
12	Michal Březina	Czech Republic	215.52	8	78.61	13	136.91
13	Ivan Righini	Italy	210.15	14	69.96	11	140.19
14	Ivan Pavlov	Ukraine	202.87	15	68.94	14	133.93
15	Kévin Aymoz	France	199.47	13	71.26	18	128.21
16	Graham Newberry	Great Britain	198.06	16	67.79	16	130.27
17	Stéphane Walker	Switzerland	196.74	19	62.86	15	133.88
18	Javier Raya	Spain	195.54	17	66.67	17	128.87
19	Maurizio Zandron	Italy	186.40	18	63.79	19	122.61
20	Jiří Bělohradský	Czech Republic	181.62	20	60.99	21	120.63
21	Slavik Hayrapetyan	Armenia	180.78	21	60.69	22	120.09
22	Daniel Albert Naurits	Estonia	176.10	24	55.14	20	120.96
23	Valtter Virtanen	Finland	164.09	22	56.52	24	107.57
24	Sondre Oddvoll Bøe	Norway	162.85	23	55.24	23	107.61
Did not advance to free skating
25	Igor Reznichenko	Poland	54.81	25	54.81	—N/a	
26	Nicholas Vrdoljak	Croatia	53.45	26	53.45	—N/a	
27	Alexander Borovoj	Hungary	53.02	27	53.02	—N/a	
28	Thomas Kennes	Netherlands	52.95	28	52.95	—N/a	
29	Anton Karpuk	Belarus	52.26	29	52.26	—N/a	
30	Mark Gorodnitsky	Israel	51.72	30	51.72	—N/a	
31	Larry Loupolover	Azerbaijan	51.30	31	51.30	—N/a	
32	Engin Ali Artan	Turkey	50.38	32	50.38	—N/a	
33	Daniel Samohin	Israel	50.33	33	50.33	—N/a	
34	Michael Neuman	Slovakia	47.67	34	47.67	—N/a	
35	Nicky Obreykov	Bulgaria	44.83	35	44.83	—N/a	
36	Mario-Rafael Ionian	Austria	42.62	36	42.62	—N/a	

=== Ladies ===
Evgenia Medvedeva won her second European title. Medvedeva set a new world record for the free skating (150.79 points) and for the combined total (229.71 points).

Rank	Name	Nation	Total points	SP		FS	
1	Evgenia Medvedeva	Russia	229.71	1	78.92	1	150.79
2	Anna Pogorilaya	Russia	211.39	2	74.39	3	137.00
3	Carolina Kostner	Italy	210.52	3	72.40	2	138.12
4	Maria Sotskova	Russia	192.52	4	72.17	5	120.35
5	Laurine Lecavelier	France	188.10	5	63.81	4	124.29
6	Nicole Rajičová	Slovakia	179.70	7	60.98	6	118.72
7	Loena Hendrickx	Belgium	172.71	11	55.41	7	117.30
8	Ivett Tóth	Hungary	172.65	6	61.49	8	111.16
9	Roberta Rodeghiero	Italy	161.00	8	57.77	12	103.23
10	Nicole Schott	Germany	160.63	9	56.88	10	103.75
11	Emmi Peltonen	Finland	160.57	14	53.52	9	107.05
12	Anastasia Galustyan	Armenia	155.14	10	56.40	14	98.74
13	Matilda Algotsson	Sweden	154.63	18	51.35	11	103.28
14	Joshi Helgesson	Sweden	152.86	13	53.93	13	98.93
15	Helery Hälvin	Estonia	146.68	16	51.72	15	94.96
16	Maé-Bérénice Méité	France	145.07	12	54.96	19	90.11
17	Nathalie Weinzierl	Germany	143.40	22	48.70	17	94.70
18	Natasha McKay	Great Britain	140.85	24	45.97	16	94.88
19	Angelīna Kučvaļska	Latvia	139.63	20	49.05	18	90.58
20	Michaela Lucie Hanzlíková	Czech Republic	138.23	15	52.39	21	85.84
21	Anna Khnychenkova	Ukraine	136.57	21	48.93	20	87.64
22	Kerstin Frank	Austria	132.08	17	51.47	24	80.61
23	Viveca Lindfors	Finland	130.10	19	49.48	22	80.62
24	Anne Line Gjersem	Norway	128.68	23	48.06	23	80.62
Did not advance to free skating
25	Julia Sauter	Romania	45.59	25	45.59	—N/a	
26	Daša Grm	Slovenia	43.48	26	43.48	—N/a	
27	Yasmine Kimiko Yamada	Switzerland	42.33	27	42.33	—N/a	
28	Elžbieta Kropa	Lithuania	41.52	28	41.52	—N/a	
29	Antonina Dubinina	Serbia	41.05	29	41.05	—N/a	
30	Colette Coco Kaminski	Poland	39.83	30	39.83	—N/a	
31	Aimee Buchanan	Israel	38.49	31	38.49	—N/a	
32	Birce Atabey	Turkey	35.59	32	35.59	—N/a	
33	Valentina Matos	Spain	34.79	33	34.79	—N/a	
34	Hristina Vassileva	Bulgaria	24.55	34	24.55	—N/a	

=== Pairs ===
Bronze medalists the previous two years, Tarasova/Morozov won their first European title after placing first in the short program and second in the free skate. Ranked third in the short and first in the free, Savchenko/Massot received silver for the second consecutive year. Bronze medalists James/Ciprès were the first French pair to win a European medal in fourteen years (since 2003, when Sarah Abitbol / Stéphane Bernadis took silver).

Rank	Name	Nation	Total points	SP		FS	
1	Evgenia Tarasova / Vladimir Morozov	Russia	227.58	1	80.82	2	146.76
2	Aliona Savchenko / Bruno Massot	Germany	222.35	3	73.76	1	148.59
3	Vanessa James / Morgan Ciprès	France	220.02	2	74.18	3	145.84
4	Ksenia Stolbova / Fedor Klimov	Russia	216.51	4	73.70	4	142.81
5	Natalia Zabiiako / Alexander Enbert	Russia	200.75	5	72.38	5	128.37
6	Valentina Marchei / Ondřej Hotárek	Italy	191.93	6	66.53	6	125.40
7	Anna Dušková / Martin Bidař	Czech Republic	189.09	7	65.90	7	123.19
8	Nicole Della Monica / Matteo Guarise	Italy	180.99	8	63.97	8	117.02
9	Miriam Ziegler / Severin Kiefer	Austria	165.63	9	57.14	9	108.49
10	Tatiana Danilova / Mikalai Kamianchuk	Belarus	151.55	10	53.27	10	98.28
11	Rebecca Ghilardi / Filippo Ambrosini	Italy	148.48	14	50.71	11	97.77
12	Minerva Fabienne Hase / Nolan Seegert	Germany	147.40	13	51.27	12	96.13
13	Lola Esbrat / Andrei Novoselov	France	145.72	11	52.51	13	93.21
14	Zoe Jones / Christopher Boyadji	Great Britain	143.42	12	52.32	14	91.10
15	Lana Petranović / Antonio Souza-Kordeiru	Croatia	140.09	15	49.25	15	90.84
16	Arina Cherniavskaia / Evgeni Krasnopolski	Israel	133.32	16	47.92	16	85.40
Did not advance to free skating
17	Ioulia Chtchetinina / Noah Scherer	Switzerland	47.52	17	47.52	—N/a	
18	Goda Butkutė / Nikita Ermolaev	Lithuania	44.79	18	44.79	—N/a	

=== Ice dancing ===
Papadakis/Cizeron became European champions for the third consecutive year.

Rank	Name	Nation	Total points	SD		FD	
1	Gabriella Papadakis / Guillaume Cizeron	France	189.67	3	75.48	1	114.19
2	Anna Cappellini / Luca Lanotte	Italy	186.64	2	75.65	2	110.99
3	Ekaterina Bobrova / Dmitri Soloviev	Russia	186.56	1	76.18	3	110.38
4	Isabella Tobias / Ilia Tkachenko	Israel	169.29	5	69.35	4	99.94
5	Alexandra Stepanova / Ivan Bukin	Russia	166.93	6	68.17	5	98.76
6	Charlène Guignard / Marco Fabbri	Italy	163.68	4	70.46	7	93.22
7	Laurence Fournier Beaudry / Nikolaj Sørensen	Denmark	160.68	7	66.02	6	94.66
8	Natalia Kaliszek / Maksym Spodyriev	Poland	156.02	10	63.35	8	92.67
9	Oleksandra Nazarova / Maxim Nikitin	Ukraine	154.65	9	63.36	10	91.29
10	Victoria Sinitsina / Nikita Katsalapov	Russia	154.51	8	64.67	12	89.84
11	Alisa Agafonova / Alper Uçar	Turkey	153.68	11	62.33	9	91.35
12	Marie-Jade Lauriault / Romain Le Gac	France	152.40	12	61.48	11	90.92
13	Sara Hurtado / Kirill Khaliavin	Spain	141.36	13	56.52	15	84.84
14	Kavita Lorenz / Joti Polizoakis	Germany	141.32	15	54.63	13	86.69
15	Lilah Fear / Lewis Gibson	Great Britain	136.99	19	50.75	14	86.24
16	Lucie Myslivečková / Lukáš Csölley	Slovakia	136.64	17	52.84	16	83.80
17	Cecilia Törn / Jussiville Partanen	Finland	131.11	14	54.99	18	76.12
18	Taylor Tran / Saulius Ambrulevičius	Lithuania	129.95	20	49.87	17	80.08
19	Tina Garabedian / Simon Proulx-Sénécal	Armenia	128.05	16	53.00	19	75.05
20	Viktoria Kavaliova / Yurii Bieliaiev	Belarus	125.42	18	52.39	20	73.03
Did not advance to free dance
21	Robynne Tweedale / Joseph Buckland	Great Britain	49.55	21	49.55	—N/a	
22	Jasmine Tessari / Francesco Fioretti	Italy	49.44	22	49.44	—N/a	
23	Olga Jakushina / Andrey Nevskiy	Latvia	49.14	23	49.14	—N/a	
24	Varvara Ogloblina / Mikhail Zhirnov	Azerbaijan	48.45	24	48.45	—N/a	
25	Victoria Manni / Carlo Röthlisberger	Switzerland	47.19	25	47.19	—N/a	
26	Nicole Kuzmichová / Alexandr Sinicyn	Czech Republic	47.16	26	47.16	—N/a	
27	Tatiana Kozmava / Oleksii Shumskyi	Georgia	43.80	27	43.80	—N/a	
28	Hanna Jakucs / Dániel Illés	Hungary	43.50	28	43.50	—N/a	
29	Katerina Bunina / Germand Frolov	Estonia	39.47	29	39.47	—N/a	
30	Adel Tankova / Ronald Zilberberg	Israel	38.49	30	38.49	—N/a	

== Medals summary ==
=== Medals by country ===
Table of medals for overall placement:

Rank	Nation	Gold	Silver	Bronze	Total
1	Russia (RUS)	2	2	2	6
2	France (FRA)	1	0	1	2
3	Spain (ESP)	1	0	0	1
4	Italy (ITA)	0	1	1	2
5	Germany (GER)	0	1	0	1
Totals (5 entries)		4	4	4	12

Table of small medals for placement in the short segment:

Rank	Nation	Gold	Silver	Bronze	Total
1	Russia (RUS)	3	2	0	5
2	Spain (ESP)	1	0	0	1
3	France (FRA)	0	1	1	2
3	Italy (ITA)	0	1	1	2
5	Germany (GER)	0	0	1	1
5	Israel (ISR)	0	0	1	1
Totals (6 entries)		4	4	4	12

Table of small medals for placement in the free segment:

Rank	Nation	Gold	Silver	Bronze	Total
1	Russia (RUS)	1	2	3	6
2	France (FRA)	1	0	1	2
3	Germany (GER)	1	0	0	1
3	Spain (ESP)	1	0	0	1
5	Italy (ITA)	0	2	0	2
Totals (5 entries)		4	4	4	12

=== Medalists ===
Medals for overall placement

Discipline	Gold	Silver	Bronze
Men	(Spain) Javier Fernández	(Russia) Maxim Kovtun	(Russia) Mikhail Kolyada
Ladies	(Russia) Evgenia Medvedeva	(Russia) Anna Pogorilaya	(Italy) Carolina Kostner
Pairs	(Russia) Evgenia Tarasova / Vladimir Morozov	(Germany) Aliona Savchenko / Bruno Massot	(France) Vanessa James / Morgan Ciprès
Ice dance	(France) Gabriella Papadakis / Guillaume Cizeron	(Italy) Anna Cappellini / Luca Lanotte	(Russia) Ekaterina Bobrova / Dmitri Soloviev

Small medals for placement in the short segment

Discipline	Gold	Silver	Bronze
Men	(Spain) Javier Fernández	(Russia) Maxim Kovtun	(Israel) Oleksii Bychenko
Ladies	(Russia) Evgenia Medvedeva	(Russia) Anna Pogorilaya	(Italy) Carolina Kostner
Pairs	(Russia) Evgenia Tarasova / Vladimir Morozov	(France) Vanessa James / Morgan Ciprès	(Germany) Aliona Savchenko / Bruno Massot
Ice dance	(Russia) Ekaterina Bobrova / Dmitri Soloviev	(Italy) Anna Cappellini / Luca Lanotte	(France) Gabriella Papadakis / Guillaume Cizeron

Small medals for placement in the free segment

Discipline	Gold	Silver	Bronze
Men	(Spain) Javier Fernández	(Russia) Maxim Kovtun	(Russia) Mikhail Kolyada
Ladies	(Russia) Evgenia Medvedeva	(Italy) Carolina Kostner	(Russia) Anna Pogorilaya
Pairs	(Germany) Aliona Savchenko / Bruno Massot	(Russia) Evgenia Tarasova / Vladimir Morozov	(France) Vanessa James / Morgan Ciprès
Ice dance	(France) Gabriella Papadakis / Guillaume Cizeron	(Italy) Anna Cappellini / Luca Lanotte	(Russia) Ekaterina Bobrova / Dmitri Soloviev
