= 2016 European Figure Skating Championships =

Figure skating competition

- Type: ISU Championship
- Date: 25–31 January 2016
- Season: 2015–16
- Location: Bratislava, Slovakia
- Host: Slovak Figure Skating Association
- Venue: Ondrej Nepela Arena

Champions
- Men's singles: (Spain) Javier Fernández
- Ladies' singles: (Russia) Evgenia Medvedeva
- Pairs: (Russia) Tatiana Volosozhar / Maxim Trankov
- Ice dance: (France) Gabriella Papadakis / Guillaume Cizeron
- Previous: 2015 European Championships
- Next: 2017 European Championships

The 2016 European Figure Skating Championships were held 25–31 January 2016 in Bratislava, Slovakia. Medals were awarded in the disciplines of men's singles, ladies' singles, pairs, and ice dancing.

== Eligibility ==
Skaters were eligible for the event if they represented a European member nation of the International Skating Union and had reached the age of 15 before July 1, 2015 in their place of birth. The corresponding competition for non-European skaters is the 2016 Four Continents Championships. National associations selected their entries according to their own criteria but the ISU mandated that their selections achieve a minimum technical elements score (TES) at an international event prior to the European Championships.

=== Minimum TES ===
Minimum technical scores (TES)
Discipline	SP / SD	FS / FD
Men	25	45
Ladies	20	36
Pairs	20	36
Ice dance	19	29
Scores had to be achieved at an ISU-recognized international event in the ongoing or preceding season. SP and FS scores could be attained at different events.

=== Number of entries per discipline ===
Based on the results of the 2015 European Championships, the ISU allowed each country one to three entries per discipline.

Spots	Men	Ladies	Pairs	Dance
3	Russia	Russia; Sweden	Russia; Italy	Russia; Italy; France
2	Czech Republic; Spain; France; Germany; Israel; Italy	France; Germany; Latvia; Italy	Austria; France (United Kingdom) Great Britain; Germany	Denmark; Spain; Germany; Slovakia
If not listed above, one entry is allowed.

== Entries ==
National associations began announcing their selections in mid-December 2015. The ISU published a complete list on 5 January 2016:

Country	Men	Ladies	Pairs	Ice dancing
Armenia	Slavik Hayrapetyan	Anastasia Galustyan		Tina Garabedian / Simon Proulx-Sénécal
Austria	Mario-Rafael Ionian	Kerstin Frank	Miriam Ziegler / Severin Kiefer	Barbora Silná / Juri Kurakin
Azerbaijan	Larry Loupolover			
Belarus	Alexei Mialionkhin	Janina Makeenka	Tatiana Danilova / Mikalai Kamianchuk	Viktoria Kavaliova / Yurii Bieliaiev
Belgium	Jorik Hendrickx	Charlotte Vandersarren		
Bulgaria		Daniela Stoeva		
Croatia	Nicholas Vrdoljak			
Czech Republic	Jiří Bělohradský; Michal Březina	Eliška Březinová		Cortney Mansour / Michal Češka
Denmark		Pernille Sørensen		Laurence Fournier Beaudry / Nikolaj Sørensen
Estonia	Daniil Zurav	Helery Hälvin		
Finland	Valtter Virtanen	Viveca Lindfors		Cecilia Törn / Jussiville Partanen
France	Florent Amodio	Laurine Lecavelier; Maé-Bérénice Méité	Vanessa James / Morgan Ciprès	Lorenza Alessandrini / Pierre Souquet; Peroline Ojardias / Michael Bramante; Gabriella Papadakis / Guillaume Cizeron
Georgia	Armen Agaian			
Germany	Franz Streubel; Paul Fentz	Lutricia Bock; Nathalie Weinzierl	Aliona Savchenko / Bruno Massot; Mari Vartmann / Ruben Blommaert	Kavita Lorenz / Panagiotis Polizoakis; Katharina Müller / Tim Dieck
(United Kingdom) Great Britain	Phillip Harris	Danielle Harrison		Penny Coomes / Nicholas Buckland
Hungary	Alexander Maszljanko	Ivett Tóth	Anna Marie Pearce / Mark Magyar	Carolina Moscheni / Balázs Major
Israel	Oleksii Bychenko; Daniel Samohin	Aimee Buchanan	Adel Tankova / Evgeni Krasnopolski	Isabella Tobias / Ilia Tkachenko
Italy	Ivan Righini; Matteo Rizzo	Roberta Rodeghiero; Giada Russo	Nicole Della Monica / Matteo Guarise; Bianca Manacorda / Niccolò Macii; Valentina Marchei / Ondřej Hotárek	Anna Cappellini / Luca Lanotte; Charlène Guignard / Marco Fabbri; Misato Komatsubara / Andrea Fabbri
Latvia	Deniss Vasiļjevs	Angelīna Kučvaļska		Olga Jakushina / Andrey Nevskiy
Lithuania		Aleksandra Golovkina	Goda Butkutė / Nikita Ermolaev	Taylor Tran / Saulius Ambrulevičius
Luxembourg		Fleur Maxwell		
Netherlands	Thomas Kennes	Niki Wories		
Norway	Sondre Oddvoll Bøe	Anne Line Gjersem		
Poland	Patrick Myzyk			Natalia Kaliszek / Maksym Spodyriev
Romania		Julia Sauter		
Russia	Mikhail Kolyada; Maxim Kovtun; Alexander Petrov	Evgenia Medvedeva; Anna Pogorilaya; Elena Radionova	Kristina Astakhova / Alexei Rogonov; Evgenia Tarasova / Vladimir Morozov; Tatiana Volosozhar / Maxim Trankov	Ekaterina Bobrova / Dmitri Soloviev; Victoria Sinitsina / Nikita Katsalapov; Alexandra Stepanova / Ivan Bukin
Slovakia	Michael Neuman	Nicole Rajičová		Federica Testa / Lukáš Csölley
Slovenia	David Kranjec	Daša Grm		
Spain	Javier Fernández; Felipe Montoya	Sonia Lafuente	Marcelina Lech / Aritz Maestu	Celia Robledo / Luis Fenero
Sweden	Alexander Majorov	Matilda Algotsson; Joshi Helgesson; Isabelle Olsson		
Switzerland	Stéphane Walker	Tanja Odermatt	Alexandra Herbríková / Nicolas Roulet	Katarina Paice / Iurii Ieremenko
Turkey	Engin Ali Artan	Birce Atabey		Alisa Agafonova / Alper Uçar
Ukraine	Ivan Pavlov	Anna Khnychenkova		Valeria Haistruk / Oleksiy Oliynyk

Changes:

- Aimee Buchanan replaced Katarina Kulgeyko as Israel's entry in ladies.
- Chafik Besseghier withdrew due to a torn ligament in his right ankle. He was not replaced because France had named no substitutes.
- Yuko Kavaguti / Alexander Smirnov withdrew due to an Achilles tendon injury to Kavaguti. They were replaced by Evgenia Tarasova / Vladimir Morozov.
- Amani Fancy / Christopher Boyadji withdrew from the pairs' event and were not replaced because the Great Britain had no substitute in pairs.
- On 25 January, Ksenia Stolbova / Fedor Klimov withdrew due to Klimov's shoulder injury and were replaced by Kristina Astakhova / Alexei Rogonov.

== Time schedule ==
- Wednesday, January 27
  - Ladies - Short program: 10:15 - 15:25
  - Opening ceremony: 16:45 - 17:05
  - Men - Short program: 17:30 - 22:40
- Thursday, January 28
  - Ice dance - Short dance: 12:25 - 16:55
  - Men - Free program: 17:45 - 21:50
- Friday, January 29
  - Pairs - Short program: 13:45 - 16:50
  - Ladies - Free program: 18:00 - 21:55
- Saturday, January 30
  - Pairs - Free program: 10:00 - 13:00
  - Ice dance - Free dance: 14:30 - 17:50
- Sunday, January 31
  - Gala exhibition: 14:30 - 17:00

== Overview ==
Bratislava hosted the European Figure Skating Championships for the fourth time, having previously hosted in 1958, 1966, and 2001.

In the men's event, Spain's Javier Fernández won his fourth consecutive European title, while silver medalist Oleksii Bychenko won the first-ever European medal for Israel.

In the ladies' event, Russia's Evgenia Medvedeva became the European champion in her first season on the senior international level. Teammates Elena Radionova and Anna Pogorilaya won their second consecutive silver and bronze medals, respectively.

In the pairs' event, Russia's Tatiana Volosozhar / Maxim Trankov won their fourth European title. Germany's Aliona Savchenko / Bruno Massot took silver in their first appearance at Europeans as a pair, while Evgenia Tarasova / Vladimir Morozov repeated as the bronze medalists.

In the ice dancing event, Gabriella Papadakis / Guillaume Cizeron of France won their second consecutive European title. Both Anna Cappellini / Luca Lanotte of Italy and Ekaterina Bobrova / Dmitri Soloviev of Russia stepped onto their fourth European podium.

== Results ==
=== Men ===
Rank	Name	Nation	Total points	SP		FS	
1	Javier Fernández	Spain	302.77	1	102.54	1	200.23
2	Oleksii Bychenko	Israel	242.56	4	84.09	4	158.47
3	Maxim Kovtun	Russia	242.21	2	88.09	6	154.12
4	Florent Amodio	France	240.96	8	78.28	2	162.68
5	Mikhail Kolyada	Russia	236.58	9	77.58	3	159.00
6	Ivan Righini	Italy	236.36	6	82.23	5	154.13
7	Daniel Samohin	Israel	232.08	5	82.73	8	149.35
8	Alexander Petrov	Russia	229.69	10	76.95	7	152.74
9	Jorik Hendrickx	Belgium	221.39	7	79.13	9	142.26
10	Michal Březina	Czech Republic	211.81	3	84.30	13	127.51
11	Alexander Majorov	Sweden	204.27	11	76.34	12	127.93
12	Deniss Vasiļjevs	Latvia	204.24	14	68.32	10	135.92
13	Matteo Rizzo	Italy	200.81	12	74.91	14	125.90
14	Franz Streubel	Germany	196.17	15	68.11	11	128.06
15	Ivan Pavlov	Ukraine	189.65	13	68.78	15	120.87
16	Paul Fentz	Germany	182.59	16	67.97	17	114.62
17	Felipe Montoya	Spain	181.95	17	67.73	19	114.22
18	Phillip Harris	(United Kingdom) Great Britain	180.99	18	63.93	16	117.06
19	Stéphane Walker	Switzerland	171.79	22	57.23	18	114.56
20	Jiří Bělohradský	Czech Republic	168.57	19	60.53	21	108.04
21	Nicholas Vrdoljak	Croatia	167.07	21	59.02	20	108.05
22	David Kranjec	Slovenia	163.98	23	56.99	22	106.99
23	Mario-Rafael Ionian	Austria	160.57	24	54.16	23	106.41
24	Sondre Oddvoll Bøe	Norway	149.60	20	59.12	24	90.48
Did not advance to free skating
25	Thomas Kennes	Netherlands	53.86	25	53.86	—	
26	Valtter Virtanen	Finland	52.07	26	52.07	—	
27	Alexei Mialionkhin	Belarus	50.98	27	50.98	—	
28	Daniil Zurav	Estonia	50.50	28	50.50	—	
29	Armen Agaian	Georgia	49.32	29	49.32	—	
30	Patrick Myzyk	Poland	49.26	30	49.26	—	
31	Slavik Hayrapetyan	Armenia	46.71	31	46.71	—	
32	Larry Loupolover	Azerbaijan	44.46	32	44.46	—	
33	Alexander Maszljanko	Hungary	44.26	33	44.26	—	
34	Michael Neuman	Slovakia	42.03	34	42.03	—	
35	Engin Ali Artan	Turkey	40.60	35	40.60	—	

=== Ladies ===
Rank	Name	Nation	Total points	SP		FS	
1	Evgenia Medvedeva	Russia	215.45	1	72.55	1	142.90
2	Elena Radionova	Russia	209.99	2	70.96	2	139.03
3	Anna Pogorilaya	Russia	187.05	3	63.81	3	123.24
4	Angelīna Kučvaļska	Latvia	176.99	5	58.99	4	118.00
5	Roberta Rodeghiero	Italy	170.76	4	61.01	5	109.75
6	Maé-Bérénice Méité	France	161.23	8	57.35	6	103.88
7	Nathalie Weinzierl	Germany	160.64	7	57.36	7	103.28
8	Viveca Lindfors	Finland	155.49	11	53.92	8	101.57
9	Joshi Helgesson	Sweden	153.29	6	58.13	11	95.16
10	Laurine Lecavelier	France	152.34	13	52.84	9	99.50
11	Ivett Tóth	Hungary	150.65	10	55.54	12	95.11
12	Nicole Rajičová	Slovakia	146.10	9	57.24	18	88.86
13	Matilda Algotsson	Sweden	145.32	18	47.97	10	97.35
14	Giada Russo	Italy	143.40	12	53.52	16	89.88
15	Anastasia Galustyan	Armenia	143.05	16	48.93	13	94.12
16	Aleksandra Golovkina	Lithuania	139.83	15	49.30	15	90.53
17	Anne Line Gjersem	Norway	139.48	14	49.80	17	89.68
18	Fleur Maxwell	Luxembourg	137.76	22	46.55	14	91.21
19	Helery Hälvin	Estonia	135.02	20	47.49	19	87.53
20	Niki Wories	Netherlands	131.87	21	46.82	20	85.05
21	Anna Khnychenkova	Ukraine	128.80	19	47.90	22	80.90
22	Kerstin Frank	Austria	128.08	24	44.85	21	83.23
23	Eliška Březinová	Czech Republic	121.26	17	48.21	23	73.05
24	Isabelle Olsson	Sweden	117.50	23	45.11	24	72.39
Did not advance to free skating
25	Lutricia Bock	Germany	43.77	25	43.77	—	
26	Daša Grm	Slovenia	43.36	26	43.36	—	
27	Julia Sauter	Romania	41.79	27	41.79	—	
28	Tanja Odermatt	Switzerland	41.44	28	41.44	—	
29	Danielle Harrison	(United Kingdom) Great Britain	40.68	29	40.68	—	
30	Charlotte Vandersarren	Belgium	39.93	30	39.93	—	
31	Aimee Buchanan	Israel	39.79	31	39.79	—	
32	Birce Atabey	Turkey	37.55	32	37.55	—	
33	Sonia Lafuente	Spain	37.12	33	37.12	—	
34	Pernille Sørensen	Denmark	34.81	34	34.81	—	
35	Daniela Stoeva	Bulgaria	33.82	35	33.82	—	
36	Janina Makeenka	Belarus	27.62	36	27.62	—	

=== Pairs ===
Rank	Name	Nation	Total points	SP		FS	
1	Tatiana Volosozhar / Maxim Trankov	Russia	222.66	1	79.77	1	142.89
2	Aliona Savchenko / Bruno Massot	Germany	200.78	2	75.54	3	125.24
3	Evgenia Tarasova / Vladimir Morozov	Russia	197.55	3	70.17	2	127.38
4	Vanessa James / Morgan Ciprès	France	185.55	5	62.10	5	123.45
5	Valentina Marchei / Ondřej Hotárek	Italy	182.61	8	58.47	4	124.14
6	Nicole Della Monica / Matteo Guarise	Italy	178.97	6	61.51	6	117.46
7	Kristina Astakhova / Alexei Rogonov	Russia	174.72	7	60.63	7	114.09
8	Mari Vartmann / Ruben Blommaert	Germany	171.30	4	62.90	8	108.40
9	Miriam Ziegler / Severin Kiefer	Austria	149.07	9	52.96	10	96.11
10	Tatiana Danilova / Mikalai Kamianchuk	Belarus	147.36	10	48.72	9	98.64
11	Goda Butkutė / Nikita Ermolaev	Lithuania	139.56	11	46.85	11	92.71
12	Bianca Manacorda / Niccolò Macii	Italy	130.00	12	44.71	12	85.29
13	Adel Tankova / Evgeni Krasnopolski	Israel	114.56	14	37.81	13	76.75
14	Anna Marie Pearce / Mark Magyar	Hungary	110.55	16	36.00	14	74.55
15	Marcelina Lech / Aritz Maestu	Spain	109.11	13	40.46	15	68.65
16	Alexandra Herbríková / Nicolas Roulet	Switzerland	103.47	15	36.38	16	67.09

=== Ice dancing ===
Rank	Name	Nation	Total points	SD		FD	
1	Gabriella Papadakis / Guillaume Cizeron	France	182.71	2	70.74	1	111.97
2	Anna Cappellini / Luca Lanotte	Italy	178.01	1	72.31	3	105.70
3	Ekaterina Bobrova / Dmitri Soloviev	Russia	176.50	3	68.71	2	107.79
4	Victoria Sinitsina / Nikita Katsalapov	Russia	172.65	4	68.33	4	104.32
5	Alexandra Stepanova / Ivan Bukin	Russia	165.55	5	66.65	5	98.90
6	Penny Coomes / Nicholas Buckland	(United Kingdom) Great Britain	162.75	8	64.26	6	98.49
7	Charlène Guignard / Marco Fabbri	Italy	162.58	6	64.87	7	97.71
8	Federica Testa / Lukáš Csölley	Slovakia	158.05	9	64.24	8	95.81
9	Laurence Fournier Beaudry / Nikolaj Sørensen	Denmark	152.79	10	62.19	9	90.60
10	Isabella Tobias / Ilia Tkachenko	Israel	151.67	7	64.46	12	87.21
11	Natalia Kaliszek / Maksym Spodyriev	Poland	147.07	11	59.57	11	87.50
12	Alisa Agafonova / Alper Uçar	Turkey	145.23	12	56.33	10	88.90
13	Cortney Mansour / Michal Češka	Czech Republic	141.36	14	54.97	13	86.39
14	Kavita Lorenz / Panagiotis Polizoakis	Germany	137.99	13	55.06	15	82.93
15	Cecilia Törn / Jussiville Partanen	Finland	134.10	18	51.14	14	82.96
16	Viktoria Kavaliova / Yurii Bieliaiev	Belarus	133.71	17	52.25	16	81.46
17	Barbora Silná / Juri Kurakin	Austria	129.87	15	54.56	17	75.31
18	Tina Garabedian / Simon Proulx-Sénécal	Armenia	125.19	20	50.17	18	75.02
19	Celia Robledo / Luis Fenero	Spain	122.81	19	50.19	19	72.62
20	Lorenza Alessandrini / Pierre Souquet	France	121.43	16	54.37	20	67.06
Did not advance to free dance
21	Misato Komatsubara / Andrea Fabbri	Italy	49.56	21	49.56	—	
22	Olga Jakushina / Andrey Nevskiy	Latvia	49.49	22	49.49	—	
23	Katharina Müller / Tim Dieck	Germany	48.75	23	48.75	—	
24	Peroline Ojardias / Michael Bramante	France	48.36	24	48.36	—	
25	Taylor Tran / Saulius Ambrulevičius	Lithuania	45.09	25	45.09	—	
26	Valeria Haistruk / Oleksiy Oliynyk	Ukraine	44.44	26	44.44	—	
27	Carolina Moscheni / Balázs Major	Hungary	42.87	27	42.87	—	
28	Katarina Paice / Yuri Eremenko	Switzerland	36.23	28	36.23	—	

== Medals summary ==
=== Medals by country ===
Table of medals for overall placement:

Rank	Nation	Gold	Silver	Bronze	Total
1	Russia (RUS)	2	1	4	7
2	France (FRA)	1	0	0	1
2	Spain (ESP)	1	0	0	1
4	Germany (GER)	0	1	0	1
4	Israel (ISR)	0	1	0	1
4	Italy (ITA)	0	1	0	1
Totals (6 entries)		4	4	4	12

Table of small medals for placement in the short segment:

Rank	Nation	Gold	Silver	Bronze	Total
1	Russia (RUS)	2	2	3	7
2	Italy (ITA)	1	0	0	1
2	Spain (ESP)	1	0	0	1
4	France (FRA)	0	1	0	1
4	Germany (GER)	0	1	0	1
6	Czech Republic (CZE)	0	0	1	1
Totals (6 entries)		4	4	4	12

Table of small medals for placement in the free segment:

Rank	Nation	Gold	Silver	Bronze	Total
1	Russia (RUS)	2	3	2	7
2	France (FRA)	1	1	0	2
3	Spain (ESP)	1	0	0	1
4	Germany (GER)	0	0	1	1
4	Italy (ITA)	0	0	1	1
Totals (5 entries)		4	4	4	12

=== Medalists ===
Medals for overall placement

Discipline	Gold	Silver	Bronze
Men	(Spain) Javier Fernández	(Israel) Alexei Bychenko	(Russia) Maxim Kovtun
Ladies	(Russia) Evgenia Medvedeva	(Russia) Elena Radionova	(Russia) Anna Pogorilaya
Pairs	(Russia) Tatiana Volosozhar / Maxim Trankov	(Germany) Aliona Savchenko / Bruno Massot	(Russia) Evgenia Tarasova / Vladimir Morozov
Ice dance	(France) Gabriella Papadakis / Guillaume Cizeron	(Italy) Anna Cappellini / Luca Lanotte	(Russia) Ekaterina Bobrova / Dmitri Soloviev

Small medals for placement in the short segment

Discipline	Gold	Silver	Bronze
Men	(Spain) Javier Fernández	(Russia) Maxim Kovtun	(Czech Republic) Michal Březina
Ladies	(Russia) Evgenia Medvedeva	(Russia) Elena Radionova	(Russia) Anna Pogorilaya
Pairs	(Russia) Tatiana Volosozhar / Maxim Trankov	(Germany) Aliona Savchenko / Bruno Massot	(Russia) Evgenia Tarasova / Vladimir Morozov
Ice dance	(Italy) Anna Cappellini / Luca Lanotte	(France) Gabriella Papadakis / Guillaume Cizeron	(Russia) Ekaterina Bobrova / Dmitri Soloviev

Small medals for placement in the free segment

Discipline	Gold	Silver	Bronze
Men	(Spain) Javier Fernández	(France) Florent Amodio	(Russia) Mikhail Kolyada
Ladies	(Russia) Evgenia Medvedeva	(Russia) Elena Radionova	(Russia) Anna Pogorilaya
Pairs	(Russia) Tatiana Volosozhar / Maxim Trankov	(Russia) Evgenia Tarasova / Vladimir Morozov	(Germany) Aliona Savchenko / Bruno Massot
Ice dance	(France) Gabriella Papadakis / Guillaume Cizeron	(Russia) Ekaterina Bobrova / Dmitri Soloviev	(Italy) Anna Cappellini / Luca Lanotte
