= 2017 CS Ondrej Nepela Trophy =

Figure skating competition

- Type: ISU Challenger Series
- Date: September 21 – 23
- Season: 2017–2018
- Location: Bratislava
- Venue: Ondrej Nepela Ice Rink

Champions
- Men's singles: (Russia) Mikhail Kolyada
- Ladies' singles: (Russia) Evgenia Medvedeva
- Pairs: (Russia) Natalia Zabiiako / Alexander Enbert
- Ice dance: (Russia) Ekaterina Bobrova / Dmitri Soloviev
- Previous: 2016 CS Ondrej Nepela Memorial
- Next: 2018 CS Ondrej Nepela Trophy

The 2017 CS Ondrej Nepela Trophy was held in September 2017. It is an annual senior international figure skating competition held in Bratislava, Slovakia. It was part of the 2017–18 ISU Challenger Series. Medals were awarded in the disciplines of men's singles, ladies' singles, pair skating, and ice dance.

== Entries ==
The International Skating Union published the full preliminary list of entries on 24 August 2017.

Country	Men	Ladies	Pairs	Ice dance
Armenia	Slavik Hayrapetyan			
Australia	Brendan Kerry	Kailani Craine		Kimberley Hew-Low / Timothy McKernan
Austria	Albert Muck	Lara Roth		
Belarus				Viktoria Kavaliova / Yurii Bieliaiev
Canada	Nicolas Nadeau	Larkyn Austman	Natasha Purich / Davin Portz	
Chinese Taipei	Tsao Chih-i			
Czech Republic	Jan Kurnik	Eliška Březinová; Aneta Janiczková		Cortney Mansour / Michal Češka
France	Chafik Besseghier			Angélique Abachkina / Louis Thauron
Germany				Shari Koch / Christian Nüchtern
Hungary	Alexander Maszljanko			Anna Yanovskaya / Ádám Lukács
Italy	Marco Zandron			
Japan	Ryuju Hino; Keiji Tanaka	Rika Hongo		
Latvia		Angelīna Kučvaļska; Diāna Ņikitina		Aurelija Ipolito / Malcolm Jones; Olga Jakushina / Andrey Nevskiy
Lithuania				Allison Reed / Saulius Ambrulevičius
Russia	Mikhail Kolyada; Alexander Samarin; Sergei Voronov	Alena Leonova; Evgenia Medvedeva; Elena Radionova	Kristina Astakhova / Alexei Rogonov; Alisa Efimova / Alexander Korovin; Natalia Zabiiako / Alexander Enbert	Ekaterina Bobrova / Dmitri Soloviev; Betina Popova / Sergey Mozgov
Singapore		Ceciliane Mei Ling Hartmann		
Slovakia	Marco Klepoch; Jakub Krsnak; Michael Neuman	Ema Gabaniova; Alexandra Hagarova; Silvia Hugec; Nina Letenayova; Nicole Rajičová		
South Korea	Kim Jin-seo	Choi Da-bin; Yoon Seo-young		Yura Min / Alexander Gamelin
Switzerland	Lukas Britschgi			
Sweden		Isabelle Olsson		
Turkey	Engin Ali Artan; Burak Demirboga	Birce Atabey; Sıla Saygı		
Ukraine	Ivan Pavlov	Anastasia Hozhva		Yuliia Zhata / Yan Lukouski
United Kingdom		Danielle Harrison; Katie Powell; Karly Robertson		Robynne Tweedale / Joseph Buckland
United States	Grant Hochstein	Gracie Gold; Caroline Zhang	Jessica Pfund / Joshua Santillan; Erika Smith / AJ Reiss	Rachel Parsons / Michael Parsons

Withdrew before starting orders were drawn

- Ice dance: Sofia Evdokimova / Egor Bazin (RUS)

== Results ==
=== Men ===
Rank	Name	Nation	Total points	SP		FS	
1	Mikhail Kolyada	Russia	247.81	10	66.65	1	181.16
2	Sergei Voronov	Russia	234.07	1	80.85	2	153.22
3	Brendan Kerry	Australia	221.21	5	74.71	3	146.50
4	Grant Hochstein	United States	217.52	2	79.98	6	137.54
5	Alexander Samarin	Russia	213.67	3	75.94	5	137.73
6	Nicolas Nadeau	Canada	205.97	8	66.75	4	139.22
7	Chafik Besseghier	France	203.69	7	67.04	7	136.65
8	Keiji Tanaka	Japan	197.18	4	75.81	9	121.37
9	Ivan Pavlov	Ukraine	187.16	9	66.67	10	120.49
10	Kim Jin-seo	South Korea	184.46	14	62.19	8	122.27
11	Ryuju Hino	Japan	184.33	6	67.25	11	117.08
12	Burak Demirboga	Turkey	181.24	11	64.96	13	116.28
13	Slavik Hayrapetyan	Armenia	181.18	12	64.86	12	116.32
14	Chih-I Tsao	Chinese Taipei	178.94	13	63.53	14	115.41
15	Lukas Britschgi	Switzerland	162.06	15	54.19	15	107.87
16	Engin Ali Artan	Turkey	155.15	16	54.03	17	101.12
17	Michael Neuman	Slovakia	147.58	18	46.08	16	101.50
18	Jan Kurnik	Czech Republic	146.58	17	50.10	18	96.48
19	Marco Zandron	Italy	133.49	22	41.49	19	92.00
20	Alexander Maszljanko	Hungary	131.64	21	41.58	20	90.06
21	Marco Klepoch	Slovakia	133.48	20	42.06	21	88.90
22	Jakub Krsnak	Slovakia	121.48	19	43.24	22	78.24
23	Albert Muck	Austria	102.22	23	37.99	23	64.23

=== Ladies ===
Rank	Name	Nation	Total points	SP		FS	
1	Evgenia Medvedeva	Russia	226.72	1	80.00	1	146.72
2	Rika Hongo	Japan	189.98	2	66.49	2	123.49
3	Elena Radionova	Russia	182.21	3	64.42	4	117.79
4	Choi Da-bin	South Korea	178.93	4	56.62	3	122.31
5	Alena Leonova	Russia	170.68	5	54.70	5	115.98
6	Caroline Zhang	United States	167.95	7	53.48	6	114.47
7	Nicole Rajičová	Slovakia	161.13	8	52.87	7	108.26
8	Kailani Craine	Australia	157.84	6	54.14	8	103.70
9	Silvia Hugec	Slovakia	147.14	11	44.97	9	102.17
10	Diāna Ņikitina	Latvia	146.30	9	48.37	10	97.93
11	Eliška Březinová	Czech Republic	138.10	10	46.81	12	91.29
12	Larkyn Austman	Canada	136.82	15	42.51	11	94.31
13	Karly Robertson	United Kingdom	133.18	12	44.94	13	88.24
14	Anastasia Gozhva	Ukraine	128.37	14	42.73	14	85.64
15	Danielle Harrison	United Kingdom	125.62	16	41.62	15	84.00
16	Lara Roth	Austria	119.18	13	42.76	16	76.42
17	Sıla Saygı	Turkey	115.32	18	39.95	17	75.37
18	Aneta Janiczková	Czech Republic	106.95	19	37.37	19	69.58
19	Ceciliane Mei Ling Hartmann	Singapore	103.87	21	33.17	18	70.70
20	Birce Atabey	Turkey	103.48	17	40.04	22	63.44
21	Katie Powell	United Kingdom	100.43	20	36.89	21	63.54
22	Nina Letenayova	Slovakia	97.22	23	29.96	20	67.26
23	Yoon Seo-young	South Korea	93.61	22	30.80	23	62.81

=== Pairs ===
Rank	Name	Nation	Total points	SP		FS	
1	Natalia Zabiiako / Alexander Enbert	Russia	192.58	2	64.52	1	128.06
2	Kristina Astakhova / Alexei Rogonov	Russia	191.12	1	67.18	2	123.94
3	Alisa Efimova / Alexander Korovin	Russia	171.22	3	61.82	3	109.40
4	Jessica Pfund / Joshua Santillan	United States	158.10	4	57.00	4	101.10
5	Natasha Purich / Davin Portz	Canada	147.84	5	52.64	5	95.20
6	Erika Smith / AJ Reiss	United States	134.25	6	45.86	6	88.39

=== Ice dance ===
Rank	Name	Nation	Total points	SD		FD	
1	Ekaterina Bobrova / Dmitri Soloviev	Russia	181.92	1	71.08	1	110.84
2	Rachel Parsons / Michael Parsons	United States	163.14	2	67.48	3	95.66
3	Betina Popova / Sergey Mozgov	Russia	161.92	3	60.98	2	100.94
4	Yura Min / Alexander Gamelin	South Korea	141.78	5	56.66	6	85.12
5	Angélique Abachkina / Louis Thauron	France	140.86	6	55.48	5	85.38
6	Allison Reed / Saulius Ambrulevičius	Lithuania	138.40	8	51.74	4	86.66
7	Shari Koch / Christian Nüchtern	Germany	136.98	4	58.04	8	78.94
8	Cortney Mansour / Michal Češka	Czech Republic	133.76	7	52.28	7	81.48
9	Viktoria Kavaliova / Yurii Bieliaiev	Belarus	125.02	10	50.48	9	74.54
10	Olga Jakushina / Andrey Nevskiy	Latvia	122.70	9	51.38	10	71.32
11	Yuliia Zhata / Yan Lukouski	Ukraine	114.22	11	43.96	11	70.26
12	Aurelija Ipolito / Malcolm Jones	Latvia	93.14	12	38.58	12	54.56
13	Kimberley Hew-Low / Timothy McKernan	Australia	82.16	13	35.18	13	46.98
