= Alper Uçar =

Turkish ice dancer (born 1985)

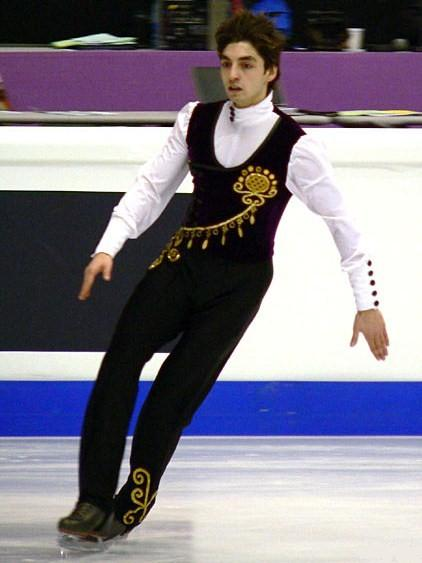
- Uçar at the 2006 European Championships

Personal information
- Born: 19 January 1985 (age 41) Denizli, Turkey
- Height: 1.83 m (6 ft 0 in)

Figure skating career
- Country: Turkey
- Discipline: Ice dance (2009–18); Men's singles (1999–2009)
- Partner: Alisa Agafonova (2010–18); Jenette Maitz (2009–10)
- Began skating: 1991
- Retired: 25 March 2018

Medal record
Turkish Championships
Gold medal – first place	2005 Ankara	Singles
Gold medal – first place	2010 Ankara	Ice dance

Alper Uçar (born 19 January 1985) is a Turkish former competitive ice dancer. With his skating partner, Alisa Agafonova, he competed at two Winter Olympics (2014 and 2018) and won eight international medals, including silver at the 2011 Winter Universiade and three medals on the ISU Challenger Series. They skated in the final segment at six European Championships and four World Championships.

Earlier in his career, Uçar competed in single skating. He is the 2005 Turkish national champion and a four-time junior national champion.

== Career ==
=== Early years ===
Uçar started skating in 1997, after the first ice rink opened in Ankara, Turkey. He competed in single skating until 2009. In 2001, he won the gold medal in the novice men's event at the Balkan Games. He then took gold at a competition in the Netherlands.

In 2009, at the age of 24, Uçar switched to ice dance and teamed up with Jenette Maitz from the United States. They competed together in the 2009–2010 season, winning the Turkish national title and placing 26th at the 2010 World Championships. They were coached by Natalia Dubova and Oleg Voyko in Stamford, Connecticut.

=== First three seasons with Agafonova ===
In 2010, Uçar teamed up with Ukraine's Alisa Agafonova to compete for Turkey. They won a silver medal at the 2011 Winter Universiade, skating in their first season together.

Agafonova/Uçar placed 26th at the 2012 European Championships in Sheffield, England, and 31st at the 2012 World Championships in Nice, France.

Agafonova/Uçar were originally coached by Natalia Dubova and Oleg Voyko in Stamford, Connecticut. They changed coaches in December 2012, deciding to join Alexander Zhulin and Oleg Volkov in Moscow, Russia. They placed 13th at the 2013 European Championships in Zagreb, Croatia, and 28th at the 2013 World Championships in London, Ontario, Canada.

=== 2013–2014 season ===
Agafonova/Uçar began their season at the 2013 Nebelhorn Trophy, the final Olympic qualifying opportunity. By finishing 5th, they earned a spot for Turkey in the ice dancing event at the Olympics. They then won a silver medal at the 2013 NRW Trophy.

Agafonova/Uçar finished 17th at the 2014 European Championships in Budapest, Hungary. In February, the two competed at the 2014 Winter Olympics in Sochi, Russia; their short dance placement, 22nd, was insufficient to advance to the next segment. They qualified to the free dance and finished 20th overall at the 2014 World Championships, which took place in March in Saitama, Japan.

=== 2014–2015 season ===
In December, Agafonova/Uçar won silver at the Santa Claus Cup in Hungary. In January, they took silver at the Toruń Cup in Poland and placed 12th at the 2015 European Championships in Stockholm, Sweden. In March, they achieved their career-best world placement, 16th, at the 2015 World Championships in Shanghai, China.

=== 2015–2016 season ===
Making their Grand Prix debut, Agafonova/Uçar placed 7th at the 2015 Trophée Éric Bompard in November. In December 2015, the two moved to Bloomfield Hills, Michigan to work with Anjelika Krylova and Pasquale Camerlengo due to visa problems which were exacerbated following the 2015 Russian Sukhoi Su-24 shootdown.

They finished 12th at the 2016 European Championships in Bratislava, Slovakia, and 21st at the 2016 World Championships in Boston, United States.

=== 2016–2017 season ===
Agafonova and Uçar received two Grand Prix assignments; they placed 9th at the 2016 Skate America and 8th at the 2016 Rostelecom Cup. They ranked 11th at the 2017 European Championships in Ostrava, Czech Republic. It was the best continental result of their career.

The two finished 17th at the 2017 World Championships in Helsinki, Finland. Due to their result, Turkey qualified a spot in the ice dancing event at the 2018 Winter Olympics.

In March 2017, Uçar was elected to the ISU Athletes Commission as the ice dance representative.

=== 2017–2018 season ===
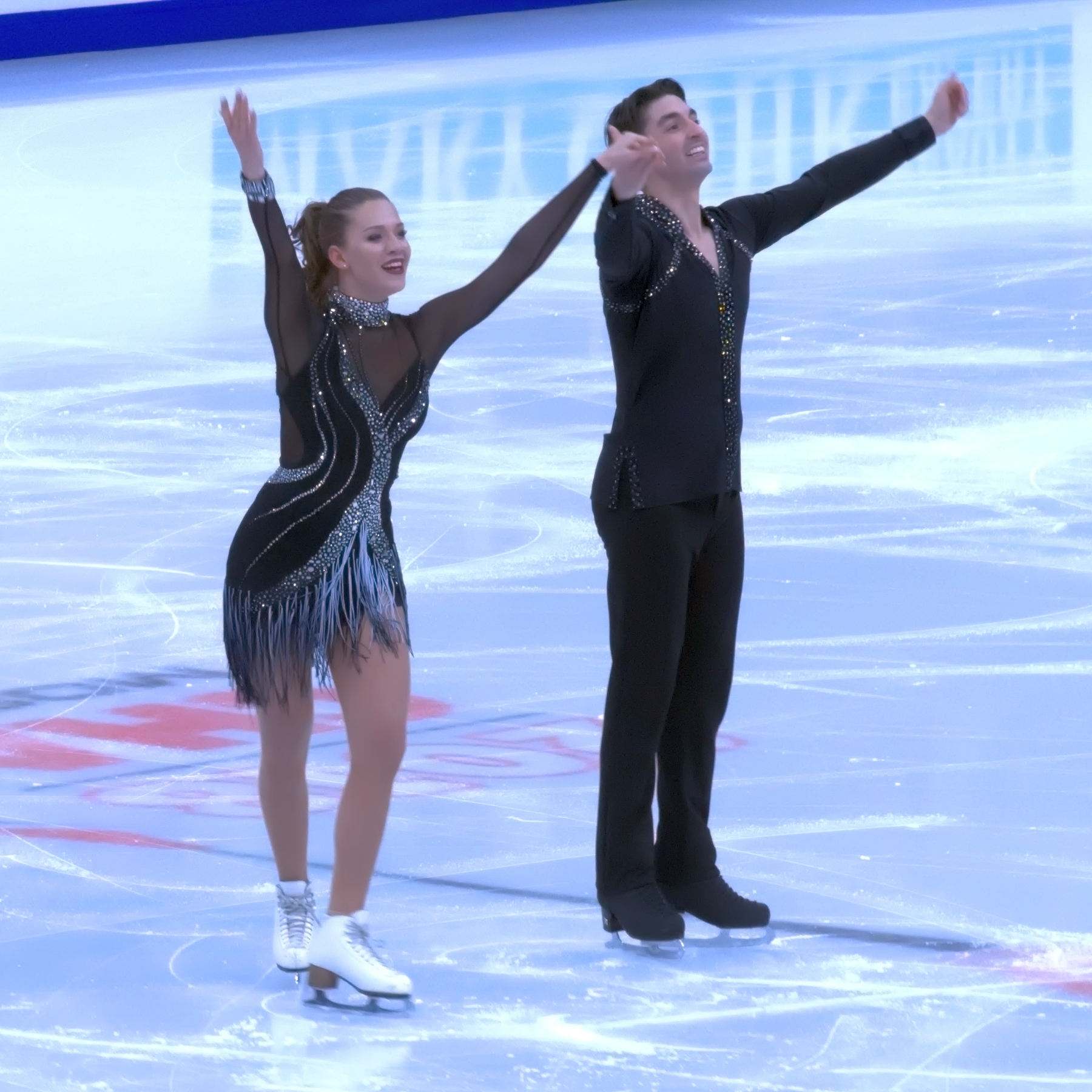
Agafonova and Uçar at the 2018 European Championships

Agafonova and Uçar competed at two Grand Prix events and then won silver at the 2017 CS Tallinn Trophy. In January, they finished 13th at the 2018 European Championships in Moscow, Russia. In February, the two competed at the 2018 Winter Olympics and qualified to the final segment. They ranked 20th in the short dance, 18th in the free dance, and 19th overall in Pyeongchang, South Korea. They had the same result at the 2018 World Championships in Milan, Italy. They announced their retirement from competitive skating on March 25, 2018.

=== Post-competitive career ===
In January 2019, Uçar moved to Estero, Florida, to coach at the Hertz Arena's International Skating Academy.

== Programs ==
=== Ice dance with Alisa Agafonova ===
Season	Short dance	Free dance	Exhibition
2017–18	Samba: Cuba by DJ Rebel ft. Gibson Brothers; Rhumba: How Deep Is Your Love (DJ Maksy Remix) by Sophia Guem; Samba: Cuba by DJ Rebel ft. Gibson Brothers	Marco Polo by Loreena McKennitt; Cleopatra by Maxime Rodriguez; Iron by Woodkid	
2016–17	Blues: Why Don't You Do Right? performed by Amy Irving; Jive: Straight to... Number One by Touch and Go	Near Light by Ólafur Arnalds; Beethoven's Five Secrets by The Piano Guys; Sand by Nathan Lanier	
2015–16	Waltz: Until...; Foxtrot: Moon over Bourbon Street by Sting	Preserved Figs ("Incir Receli") by Engin Bayrak	Say Something by A Great Big World, Christina Aguilera
2014–15	Flamenco: Babaylon by Gaudi; Paso Doble: Fuegos by Puro Latino; Flamenco: Bailando bajo la luna by Chiquita Herrada	Piano Concert No. 23 by Wolfgang Amadeus Mozart; Penser l'impossible (from Mozart Rock Opera)	
2013–14	Quickstep: Stepping Out With My Baby by Frank Devol; Foxtrot; Quickstep	Black and Blue by Dave Brubeck; I Feel Good by James Brown	
2012–13	Fairytale by Alexander Rybak	Muhteşem Yüzyil (Magnificent Century) by Fahir Atakoglu	
2011–12	La vida es un carnaval; Historia de un amor; Baila baila conmigo	Summertime performed by Victoria Pierre-Marie; Istanbul Pas Constantinople by Ayhan Sicimoglu	
2010–11	Waltz; Oblivion Tango by Astor Piazzolla	Be Italian (from Nine) by Fergie	

=== Ice dance with Jenette Maitz ===
Season	Short dance	Free dance
2009–10	Tamally Maak (Turkish folk)	Medley by Louis Armstrong

=== Single skating ===
Season	Short program	Free skating
2008–09	Bolero	Step Up
2006–08	La Vie en Rose by Louis Armstrong, Michael Bublé	Libertango by Astor Piazzolla
2005–06	Anatolian Fire (Sultan of Dance) by Mustafa Erdogan	Libertango by Astor Piazzolla
2004–05	Anatolian Fire (Sultan of Dance) by Mustafa Erdogan	Malaguena by Ernesto Lecuona
2003–04	Schindler's List by John Williams	Malaguena by Ernesto Lecuona
2002–03	Schindler's List by John Williams	The Mummy by Jerry Goldsmith
2001–02	The Tango Lesson	The Mummy by Jerry Goldsmith
2000–01	The Piano by Michael Nyman	The Mask of Zorro by James Horner

== Competitive highlights ==
- GP – Event of the ISU Grand Prix Series
- JGP – Event of the ISU Junior Grand Prix Series
- CS – Event of the ISU Challenger Series

=== Ice dance with Alisa Agafonova ===
Competition placements at senior level
Season	2010–11	2011–12	2012–13	2013–14	2014–15	2015–16	2016–17	2017–18
Winter Olympics				22nd				19th
World Championships		31st	28th	20th	16th	21st	17th	19th
European Championships		26th	13th	17th	12th	12th	11th	13th
GP Rostelecom Cup							8th	9th
GP Skate America							9th	
GP Skate Canada								10th
GP Trophée de France						7th		
CS Denkova-Staviski Cup						1st		
CS Golden Spin of Zagreb		9th		3rd			3rd	7th
CS Ice Challenge	6th		12th		6th			
CS Mordovian Ornament						4th		
CS Nebelhorn Trophy		11th		5th		6th		
CS Tallinn Trophy							4th	2nd
CS U.S. Classic							7th	
CS Warsaw Cup					5th			6th
Bavarian Open			6th					
Crystal Skate of Romania			5th					
Cup of Nice		8th						
Ice Star							2nd	
Istanbul Cup		4th						1st
Mentor Toruń Cup			4th		2nd			
Mont Blanc Trophy	5th							
NRW Trophy	7th	9th	9th	2nd		1st		
Santa Claus Cup					2nd			
Winter Universiade	2nd							

=== Ice dance with Jenette Maitz ===
Competition placements at senior level
Season	2009–10
World Championships	26th
Turkish Championships	1st

=== Single skating ===
Competition placements at senior level
Season	2004–05	2005–06	2006–07	2007–08	2008–09
World Championships	41st	33rd	27th		35th
European Championships	33rd	32nd	25th	29th	
Turkish Championships	1st				
Challenge Cup				11th	
Finlandia Trophy					16th
Golden Spin of Zagreb				21st	
Karl Schäfer Memorial		19th			
Ondrej Nepela Memorial		19th			15th
Triglav Trophy				15th	
Winter Universiade	22nd		30th		30th

Competition placements at junior level
Season	1999–2000	2000–01	2001–02	2002–03	2003–04
World Junior Championships		43rd	35th	33rd	43
Turkish Championships		1st	1st	1st	1st
JGP Bulgaria					17th
JGP Italy				25th	
Golden Bear of Zagreb	5th		2nd	3rd	7th
Triglav Trophy				10th	12th

Olympic Games
Preceded by Kelime Çetinkaya	Flagbearer for Turkey; Sochi 2014	Succeeded by Fatih Arda İpcioğlu
