= Başar Oktar =

Turkish figure skater

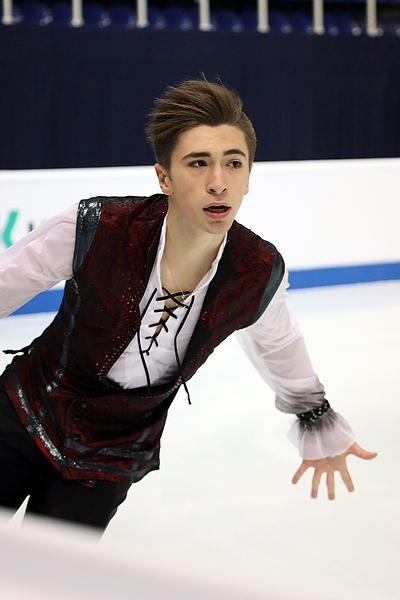
- Oktar at the 2019 World Junior Championships

Personal information
- Born: May 19, 2002 (age 24) Antalya, Turkey
- Home town: Ankara, Turkey
- Height: 1.80 m (5 ft 11 in)

Figure skating career
- Country: Turkey
- Discipline: Men's singles
- Coach: Manuela Silvia Cristudor
- Skating club: Kuzeyin Yıldızları
- Began skating: 2008

Medal record
Turkish Championships
Silver medal – second place	2021 Ankara	Singles
Silver medal – second place	2022 Samsun	Singles
Silver medal – second place	2025 Ankara	Singles

Başar Oktar (born May 19, 2002) is a Turkish figure skater. He is the 2017 Denkova-Staviski Cup silver medalist on the senior level.

== Career ==
=== Early career ===
Oktar began learning to skate in 2008 at a mall. After winning his first junior national title, he was selected to compete at the 2016 World Junior Championships in Debrecen, Hungary. His short program placement, 31st, was not enough to qualify to the free skate.

=== 2016–17 season ===
Oktar debuted on the ISU Junior Grand Prix (JGP) series in August 2016 in France. He placed 18th at the French event and later 14th in Estonia. In February 2017, he finished fourth at the European Youth Olympic Winter Festival in Erzurum, Turkey. A month later, he placed 26th in the short program at the 2017 World Junior Championships in Taipei, Taiwan.

=== 2017–18 season ===
In September, Oktar competed at two 2017 JGP events, finishing fourth in Austria and sixth in Croatia. His senior international debut came in November at the Denkova-Staviski Cup in Bulgaria. He won the silver medal behind Kevin Aymoz from France. He finished the 2017-18 season at 51st in the world ranking.

=== 2018–19 season ===
Oktar opened his season on the ISU Junior Grand Prix series, placing 13th in Canada and 11th in Slovenia. In December, he received bronze medals at Bosphorus Cup in Istanbul behind Morisi Kvitelashvili and Ivan Shmuratko.

In March, Oktar qualified to the final segment at the 2019 World Junior Championships in Zagreb, Croatia. He was the first male skater that qualified for the free program. He ranked 19th in the short program, 16th in the free skate, and 19th overall.

=== 2019–20 season ===
Oktar changed his coach before the season and moved to Ankara. He finished tenth at Junior Grand Prix events in both Riga and Zagreb. He won the silver medal at Bosphorus Cup in Istanbul, earning a national record of 209.54 points. In March, Oktar qualified to the final segment at the 2020 World Junior Championships in Tallinn, Estonia, and again finished the competition in 19th.

=== 2020–21 season ===
In October, after the COVID-19 pandemic required a lockdown for all sports activities, Oktar made his senior national debut at Atatürk Cup in Kocaeli and won the gold medal. Competing at the 2021 Turkish Championships, he took the silver medal. He competed in his first ISU Challenger Series event, the 2020 CS Budapest Trophy, where he placed fourth. He also placed fifth at the 2021 Challenge Cup in the Netherlands, setting a national record of 217.05 points in total. Oktar was selected to compete for the Turkish Figure Skating Federation at the 2021 World Championships in Stockholm, where he placed twenty-eighth.

=== 2021–22 season ===
Oktar was the designated Turkish qualifying entry at the 2021 Nebelhorn Trophy to try to secure a berth for the 2022 Winter Olympics. He finished in tenth place, 0.06 points behind fellow Turkish skater Burak Demirboğa and making Turkey the first alternate for the Olympic Games. He went on to place twentieth at the 2021 Cup of Austria.

== Programs ==
Season	Short program	Free skating
2021–22	Time Lapse by Michael Nyman	Notre Dame de Paris by Riccardo Cocciante
2020–21	Cry Me a River by Michael Bublé	Notre Dame de Paris by Riccardo Cocciante
2019–20	Cry Me a River by Michael Bublé	E lucevanle stelle (from Tosca) by Giacomo Puccini
2018–19	Dream On by Aerosmith	E lucevanle stelle (from Tosca) by Giacomo Puccini
2017–18	This Place Was A Shelter by Ólafur Arnalds	The Great Gatsby Ballet by Konstantin Meladze
2016–17	This Place Was A Shelter by Ólafur Arnalds	Whole Lotta Love; Shape of My Heart by 2Cellos
2015–16	Ain't No Sunshine by Bill Withers	Once Upon a Time in America by Ennio Morricone
2014–15	Minnie the Moocher by Big Bad Voodoo Daddy	Nyah (from Mission: Impossible 2) by Hans Zimmer
2013–14	Minnie the Moocher by Big Bad Voodoo Daddy	Nyah (from Mission: Impossible 2) by Hans Zimmer

== Competitive highlights ==
- JGP – Event of the ISU Junior Grand Prix Series
- CS – Event of the ISU Challenger Series
- WD – Withdrew from competition

Competition placements at senior level
Season	2017–18	2018–19	2019–20	2020–21	2021–22	2022–23	2023–24	2024–25	2025-26
World Championships				28th					
Turkish Championships				2nd	2nd	WD	WD	2nd	
CS Budapest Trophy				4th					
CS Cup of Austria					20th				
CS Denis Ten Memorial							12th		
CS Golden Spin of Zagreb					22nd				
CS Nebelhorn Trophy					10th				
CS Nepela Memorial								11th	
Bosphorus Cup	3rd	3rd	2nd					WD	WD
Challenge Cup				5th	6th				
Cup of Tyrol	11th								
Denkova-Staviski Cup	2nd					2nd			
Dragon Trophy		5th							
Skate Victoria		5th							
Winter University Games								24th	

Competition placements at junior level
Season	2015–16	2016–17	2017–18	2018–19	2019–20
World Junior Championships	31st	26th	25th	10th	19th
Turkish Championships	1st	1st	1st	1st	1st
JGP Austria			4th		
JGP Canada				13th	
JGP Croatia			6th		10th
JGP Estonia		14h			
JGP France		18th			
JGP Latvia					10th
JGP Slovenia				11th	
Cup of Nice			3rd		
Denkova-Staviski Cup	3rd	2nd			
Dragon Trophy			2nd		
European Youth Olympic Festival		4th			
Gardena Spring Trophy	4th				
Halloween Cup					1st
NRW Trophy		16th			
Santa Claus Cup	6th	4th			
Sarajevo Open	1st				
Skate Celje	3rd				
Skate Helena	1st	WD			
Sofia Trophy	1st				1st

== Detailed results ==
ISU personal best scores in the +5/-5 GOE System
Segment	Type	Score	Event
Total	TSS	203.22	2021 CS Nebelhorn Trophy
Short program	TSS	74.77	2021 CS Nebelhorn Trophy
Short program	TES	42.23	2021 CS Nebelhorn Trophy
Short program	PCS	32.54	2021 CS Nebelhorn Trophy
Free skating	TSS	134.01	2020 CS Budapest Trophy
Free skating	TES	70.61	2020 CS Budapest Trophy
Free skating	PCS	68.58	2021 CS Nebelhorn Trophy

Results in the 2022–23 season
Date	Event	SP		FS		Total	
Date	Event	P	Score	P	Score	P	Score
Nov 1–6, 2022	(Bulgaria) 2022 Denkova-Staviski Cup	1	77.97	3	118.24	2	196.21
Dec 23–25, 2022	(Turkey) 2023 Turkish Championships	3	72.12	—N/a	—N/a	–	WD

Results in the 2023–24 season
Date	Event	SP		FS		Total	
Date	Event	P	Score	P	Score	P	Score
Nov 2–5, 2023	(Kazakhstan) 2023 CS Denis Ten Memorial Challenge	10	65.72	12	105.88	12	171.60
Dec 15–17, 2023	(Turkey) 2024 Turkish Championships	3	64.13	—N/a	—N/a	–	WD

Results in the 2024–25 season
Date	Event	SP		FS		Total	
Date	Event	P	Score	P	Score	P	Score
Oct 25–27, 2024	(Slovakia) 2024 CS Nepela Memorial	7	66.36	12	99.48	11	165.84
Nov 28 – Dec 1, 2024	(Turkey) 2024 Bosphorus Cup	5	66.91	—N/a	—N/a	–	WD
Dec 19–22, 2024	(Turkey) 2025 Turkish Championships	1	69.31	2	126.30	2	195.61
Jan 16–18, 2025	(Italy) 2025 Winter World University Games	22	56.44	24	72.14	24	128.58

Results in the 2025-26 season
Date	Event	SP		FS		Total	
Date	Event	P	Score	P	Score	P	Score
Nov 24-30, 2025	(Turkey) 2025 Bosphorus Cup	7	51.42	—N/a	—N/a	–	WD
