= Sıla Saygı =

Turkish figure skater

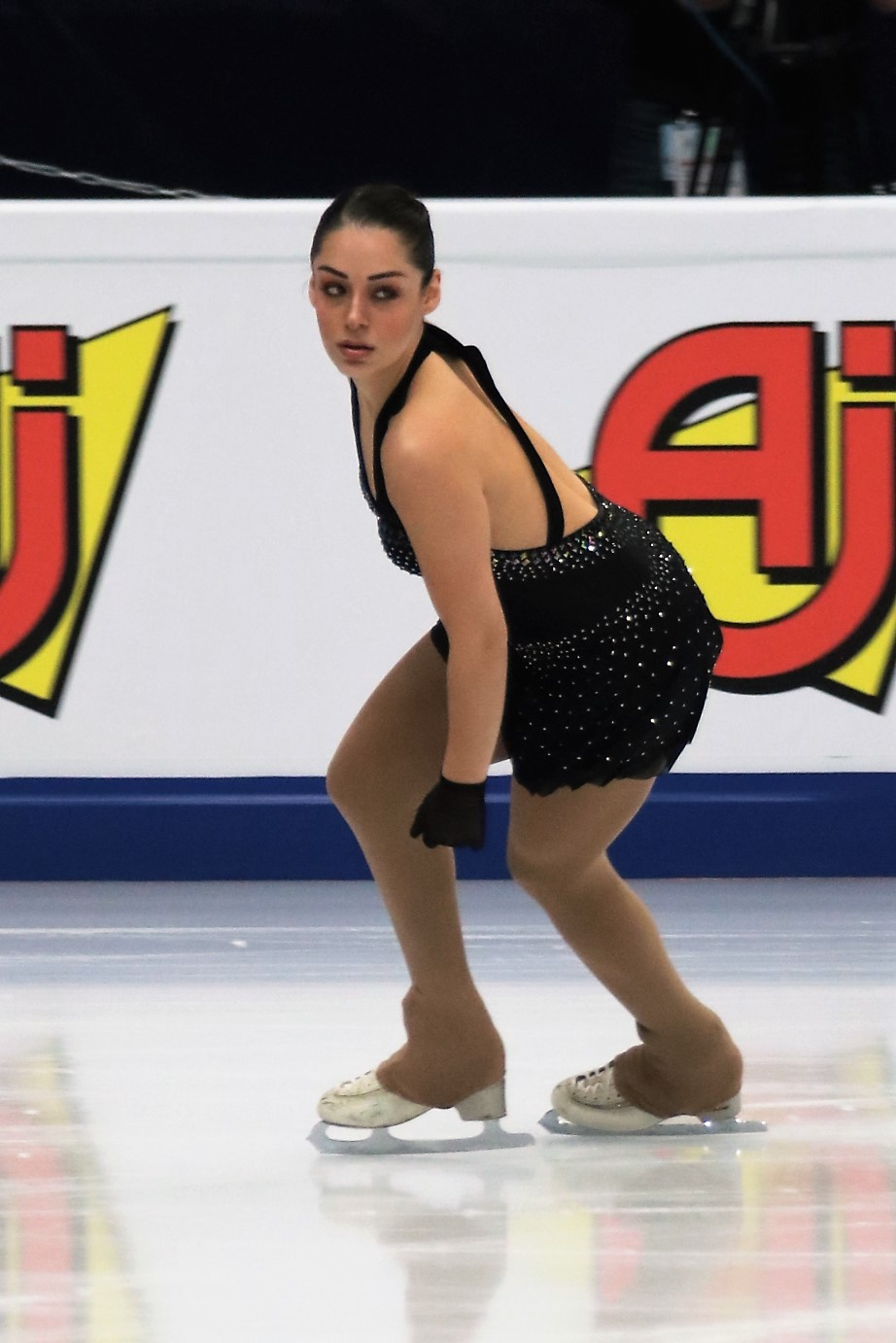
- Saygı in 2018

Personal information
- Born: 2 January 1996 (age 30) Ankara, Turkey
- Height: 1.63 m (5 ft 4 in)

Figure skating career
- Country: Turkey
- Coach: Kutay Eryoldas
- Skating club: Vizyon Skating Club Ankara
- Began skating: 2001

Sıla Saygı (born 2 January 1996) is a Turkish figure skater. She is a four-time Turkish national champion (2014, 2018–20) and qualified for the free skate at two ISU Championships – the 2010 World Junior Championships, where she finished 14th, and at the 2013 European Championships, where she finished 23rd.

== Programs ==
| Season | Short program | Free skating |
|---|---|---|
| 2017–18 | Night Train performed by Alvino Rey | Frida by Elliot Goldenthal |
| 2013–14 | Baghdad by Jesse Cook | Carmen Suite by Georges Bizet |
| 2012–13 | Baghdad by Jesse Cook | Valse Sentimentale by Pyotr Ilyich Tchaikovsky |
| 2011–12 | Libertango by Astor Piazzolla | August Rhapsody (from August Rush) |
| 2010–11 | The Entertainer by Scott Joplin | Rhapsodia Cubana by Ernesto Lecuona |
| 2009–10 | Naval (from Tabarly) by Yann Tiersen | Raymonda by Alexander Glazunov |

== Competitive highlights ==
CS: Challenger Series; JGP: Junior Grand Prix

International
| Event | 06–07 | 07–08 | 08–09 | 09–10 | 10–11 | 11–12 | 12–13 | 13–14 | 14–15 | 15–16 | 16–17 | 17–18 | 18–19 | 19–20 |
|---|---|---|---|---|---|---|---|---|---|---|---|---|---|---|
| Worlds | | | | | | 33rd | | | | | | | | |
| Europeans | | | | | | | 23rd | 37th | | | | 32nd | | |
| CS Nebelhorn | | | | | | | | | | | | 21st | | |
| CS Ondrej Nepela | | | | | | | | | | | | 17th | WD | |
| Crystal Skate | | | | | 2nd | | 7th | | | | | | | |
| Denkova-Staviski | | | | | | | 4th | 15th | | | | | | |
| Int. Challenge Cup | | | | | | | 14th | | | | | | | |
| Istanbul Cup | | | | | | | | | | | | | 9th | 7th |
| Slovenia Open | | | | | | | | 7th | | | | | | |
| Sofia Trophy | | | | | | | | | | | | | | 14th |
| Winter Universiade | | | | | | | | | | | 19th | | | |
International: Junior
| Junior Worlds | | | | 14th | 26th | 34th | | | | | | | | |
| JGP Croatia | | | | | | | 10th | | | | | | | |
| JGP France | | | | | 13th | | | | | | | | | |
| JGP Hungary | | | | 6th | | | | | | | | | | |
| JGP Latvia | | | | | | 27th | | | | | | | | |
| JGP Romania | | | | | 12th | | | | | | | | | |
| JGP Turkey | | | | 10th | | | 18th | | | | | | | |
| Bavarian Open | | | | | | 6th | | | | | | | | |
| Istanbul Cup | | | | | | 1st | | | | | | | | |
| Triglav Trophy | | | | 1st | | | | | | | | | | |
International: Novice
| Triglav Trophy | 5th | 6th | 2nd | | | | | | | | | | | |
National
| Turkish Champ. | | | | | 1st J | | | 1st | 2nd | 2nd | 2nd | 1st | 1st | 1st |
Levels: N = Novice; J = Junior
