= Turkish Figure Skating Championships =

Recurring figure skating competition

- Status: Active
- Genre: National championships
- Frequency: Annual
- Country: Turkey
- Organiser: Turkish Ice Skating Federation

The Turkish Figure Skating Championships (Turkish: Artistik Buz Pateni Türkiye Şampiyonası) are held annually to determine the national champions of Turkey. Skaters compete in men's singles, women's singles, pair skating, and ice dance at the senior and junior levels, although not every discipline is held every year due to a lack of participants. The event is organized by the Turkish Ice Skating Federation, the sport's national governing body.

== Senior medalists ==
=== Men's singles ===
Men's event medalists
Year	Location	Gold	Silver	Bronze	Ref.
2001		Deniz Atak	No other competitors		
2002					
2003–04	No men's competitors				
2005		Alper Uçar	No other competitors		
2010	Ankara	Ali Demirboğa	Kutay Eryoldaş	Eray Özbal	
2011	Ankara	Ali Demirboğa	Kutay Eryoldaş	Eray Özbal	
2012	Ankara	Ali Demirboğa	Kutay Eryoldaş	No other competitors	
2013	Ankara	Ali Demirboğa	Osman Akgün	Engin Ali Artan	
2014	Istanbul	Ali Demirboğa	Osman Akgün	Engin Ali Artan	
2015	Ankara	Engin Ali Artan	Ali Demirboğa	Osman Akgün	
2016	İzmir	Engin Ali Artan	Ali Demirboğa	Burak Demirboğa	
2017	İzmir	Engin Ali Artan	Ali Demirboğa	Mehmet Çakır	
2018	Ankara	Burak Demirboğa	Engin Ali Artan	Mehmet Çakır	
2019	Kocaeli	Burak Demirboğa	No other competitors		
2020	Samsun	Burak Demirboğa	No other competitors		
2021	Ankara	Burak Demirboğa	Başar Oktar	No other competitors	
2022	Samsun	Burak Demirboğa	Başar Oktar	No other competitors	
2023	Ankara	Burak Demirboğa		No other competitors	
2024	Kocaeli	Burak Demirboğa		Alp Töre Ovalioğlu	
2025	Ankara	Alp Eren Özkan	Başar Oktar	Burak Demirboğa	
2026	Kocaeli	Alp Eren Özkan	Burak Demirboğa	Enes Demirci	

=== Women's singles ===
Women's event medalists
Year	Location	Gold	Silver	Bronze	Ref.
2001		Nil Şirikçi	Gamze İyiiş	No other competitors	
2002					
2003		Gamze İyiiş	No other competitors		
2004		Gamze İyiiş	No other competitors		
2005		Gamze İyiiş	No other competitors		
2010	Ankara	Gamze İyiiş	Ekin Doğanay	No other competitors	
2011	Ankara	Birce Atabey	Beril Bektas	Renk Kemaloğlu	
2012	Ankara	Birce Atabey	Renk Kemaloğlu	Aybike Kahrimanceren Üstün	
2013	Ankara	Sıla Saygı	Birce Atabey	Dilan Baytan	
2014	Istanbul	Sıla Saygı	Birce Atabey	Melisa Sema Atik	
2015	Ankara	Birce Atabey	Sıla Saygı	Sinem Kuyucu	
2016	İzmir	Birce Atabey	Sıla Saygı	Sinem Kuyucu	
2017	İzmir	Birce Atabey	Sıla Saygı	Sinem Kuyucu	
2018	Ankara	Sıla Saygı	Sinem Kuyucu	Zeynep Yigit	
2019	Kocaeli	Sıla Saygı	Sinem Kuyucu	Selin Hafizoglu	
2020	Samsun	Sıla Saygı	İlayda Bayar	Sinem Kuyucu	
2021	Ankara	Zeynep Dilruba Sanoğlu	Sinem Pekder	Yasemin Seki	
2022	Samsun	Yasemin Zeki	Sinem Pekder	Ozlem Dizmen	
2023	Ankara	Salma Agamova	Ozlem Dizmen	No other competitors	
2024	Kocaeli	Ceren Karaş	Ceyda Saglam	Salma Agamova	
2025	Ankara	Ceren Karaş	Yagmur Derin Kevinc	Ceyda Saglam	
2026	Kocaeli	Salma Agamova	Selin Akbulut	Ceren Karas	

=== Pairs ===
Year	Location	Gold	Silver	Bronze	Ref.
2010	Ankara	No pairs competitors			
2013	Ankara	No pairs competitors			
2014	Istanbul	No pairs competitors			
2015	Ankara	Oľga Beständigová & İlhan Mansız	No other competitors		
2016	İzmir	Asiye Cagla Demirsal & Berk Akalin	No other competitors		
2017–26	No pairs competitors				

=== Ice dance ===
Year	Location	Gold	Silver	Bronze	Ref.
2010	Ankara	Jenette Maitz; Alper Uçar	No other competitors		
2012	Ankara	No ice dance competitors			
2013	Ankara	No ice dance competitors			
2014	Istanbul				
2015	Ankara	No ice dance competitors			
2016	İzmir	Rumeysa Odebas & Emirhan Ercan	No other competitors		
2017	İzmir	Rumeysa Odebas & Emirhan Ercan	No other competitors		
2018	Ankara	Alisa Agafonova & Alper Uçar	No other competitors		
2019					
2020-2026	Samsun	No ice dance competitors			

== Junior medalists ==
=== Men's singles ===
Year	Location	Gold	Silver	Bronze	Ref.
2014	Istanbul	Burak Demirboga	Mehmet Cakir	Oguzhan Selimoglu	
2015	Ankara	Efe Görkmen	Mehmet Çakır	Anıl Çetinbaş	
2016	İzmir	Başar Oktar	Mehmet Çakır	Efe Görkmen	
2017	İzmir	Başar Oktar	No other competitors		
2018	Ankara	Başar Oktar	Alp Eren Özkan	Ömer Efe Sayıcı	
2019	Kocaeli	Başar Oktar	Alp Eren Özkan	Ömer Efe Sayıcı	
2020	Samsun	Başar Oktar	Alp Tore Ovalioglu	No other competitors	
2021	Ankara	Ali Efe Günes	Alp Tore Ovalioglu	No other competitors	
2022	Samsun	Alp Eren Azkan	Ali Efe Günes	Efe Ergin Dincer	
2023	Ankara	Ali Efe Günes	Furkan Emre Incel	Efe Ergin Dincer	
2024	Kocaeli	Ali Efe Günes	Efe Ergin Dincer	Furkan Emre Incel	
2025	Ankara	Furkan Emre Incel	Efe Ergin Dincer	Atilla Arda Sahinolanlar	
2026	Kocaeli	Furkan Emre Incel	Mehmet Cenkay Karlikli	Ege Alacan	

=== Women's singles ===
Year	Location	Gold	Silver	Bronze	Ref.
2014	Istanbul	Elif Erdem	Selin Hafızoğlu	Ecem Ülker	
2015	Ankara	Elif Erdem	Selin Hafızoğlu	Zeynep Dilruba Sanoğlu	
2016	İzmir	Elif Erdem	İlayda Bayar	Zeynep Dilruba Sanoğlu	
2017	İzmir	Güzide Irmak Bayır	Elif Erdem	Ekin Saygı	
2018	Ankara	Güzide Irmak Bayır	İlayda Bayar	Ekin Saygı	
2019	Kocaeli	Güzide Irmak Bayır	İlayda Bayar	Ekin Saygı	
2020	Samsun	Güzide Irmak Bayır	Ceren Karaş	Elif Su Erol	
2021	Ankara	Barra Iffat	Elif Su Erol	Fatma bin Omer	
2022	Samsun	Ceren Karaş	Anna Deniz Ozdemir	Fatma Yade Karlikli	
2023	Ankara	Azra Ulus	Anna Deniz Ozdemir	Sena Lidya Bayraktaroglu	
2024	Kocaeli	Selin Akbulut	Zeynep Naz Dogan	Derya Taygan	
2025	Ankara	Azra Saglam	Zeynep Naz Dogan	Selin Akbulut	
2026	Kocaeli	Leyla Cetin	Deniz Tarim	Azra Saglam	
