= Birce Atabey =

Turkish figure skater

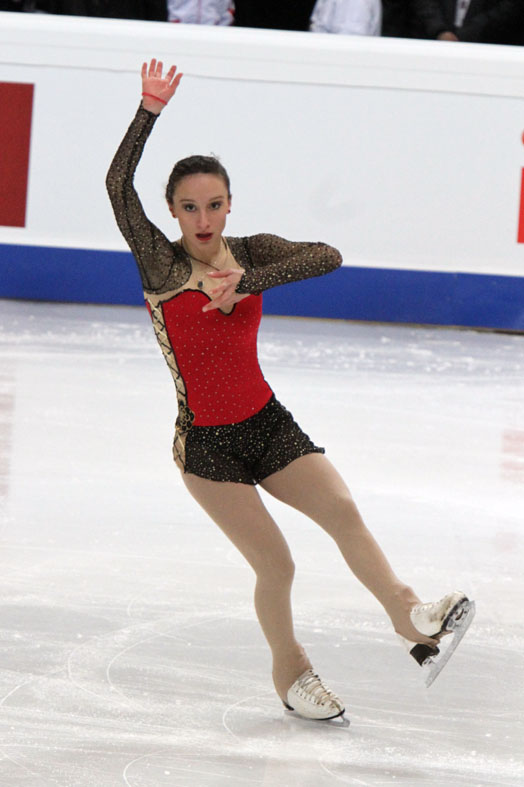
- Atabey in 2011

Personal information
- Born: 26 January 1993 (age 33) Kocaeli Province, Turkey
- Home town: Derince, Turkey
- Height: 1.58 m (5 ft 2 in)

Figure skating career
- Country: Turkey
- Coach: Rana Belkıs Göçmen
- Skating club: Gençlik Hizmetleri SC
- Began skating: 2000

Birce Atabey (born 26 January 1993) is a Turkish figure skater. She is a five-time Turkish national champion and the 2015 Sarajevo Open silver medalist.

== Programs ==
Season	Short program	Free skating
2017-18	Exogenesis: Symphony Part II by Muse	Mercy on Me by Christina Aguilera
2016-17	Malagueña by Ernesto Lecuona performed by Pepe Romero	Mercy on Me by Christina Aguilera
2015–16	Malagueña by Ernesto Lecuona performed by Pepe Romero	All of Me
2014–15	Try by Asher Book	Music by Two Steps from Hell
2013–14	Totentanz by Maksim Mrvica	Ball of the Dance
2011–12	Piano medley	Big Love Adagio by Bond
2010–11	Tango Kore	Music by Pyotr Ilyich Tchaikovsky
2009–10	Chicago by John Kander	Guitarra Latina by Edvin Marton
2008–09	Butterfly Dance	Guitarra Latina by Edvin Marton
2007–08	Amélie by Yann Tiersen	Guitarra Latina by Edvin Marton; Romeo and Juliet performed by Edvin Marton

== Competitive highlights ==
CS: Challenger Series; JGP: Junior Grand Prix

International
Event	06–07	07–08	08–09	09–10	10–11	11–12	12–13	13–14	14–15	15–16	16–17	17–18
Worlds					34th							
Europeans				30th	28th	29th			25th	32nd		
CS Denkova-Staviski										10th		
CS Golden Spin									22nd			
CS Ondrej Nepela												20th
Challenge Cup							21st					
Crystal Skate							6th					
Cup of Nice						24th						
Cup of Tyrol											13th	
DS Cup								11th				
Ice Challenge					16th							
Istanbul Cup						6th						
Nebelhorn Trophy								32nd				
Santa Cup										12th	8th	
Sarajevo Open								5th	2nd			
Slovenia Open								4th				
Triglav Trophy				19th	8th	20th	6th					
Universiade								20th	20th			
International: Junior
Junior Worlds		46th	51st									
JGP Austria					22nd							
JGP Belarus			30th	23rd								
JGP Estonia		26th										
JGP Germany					24th							
JGP Turkey				29th								
EYOF			21st									
Triglav Trophy	3rd J	7th J										
National
Turkey				1st J	1st	1st		2nd	1st	1st	1st	
J = Junior level
