= Burak Demirboğa =

Turkish figure skater (born 1996)

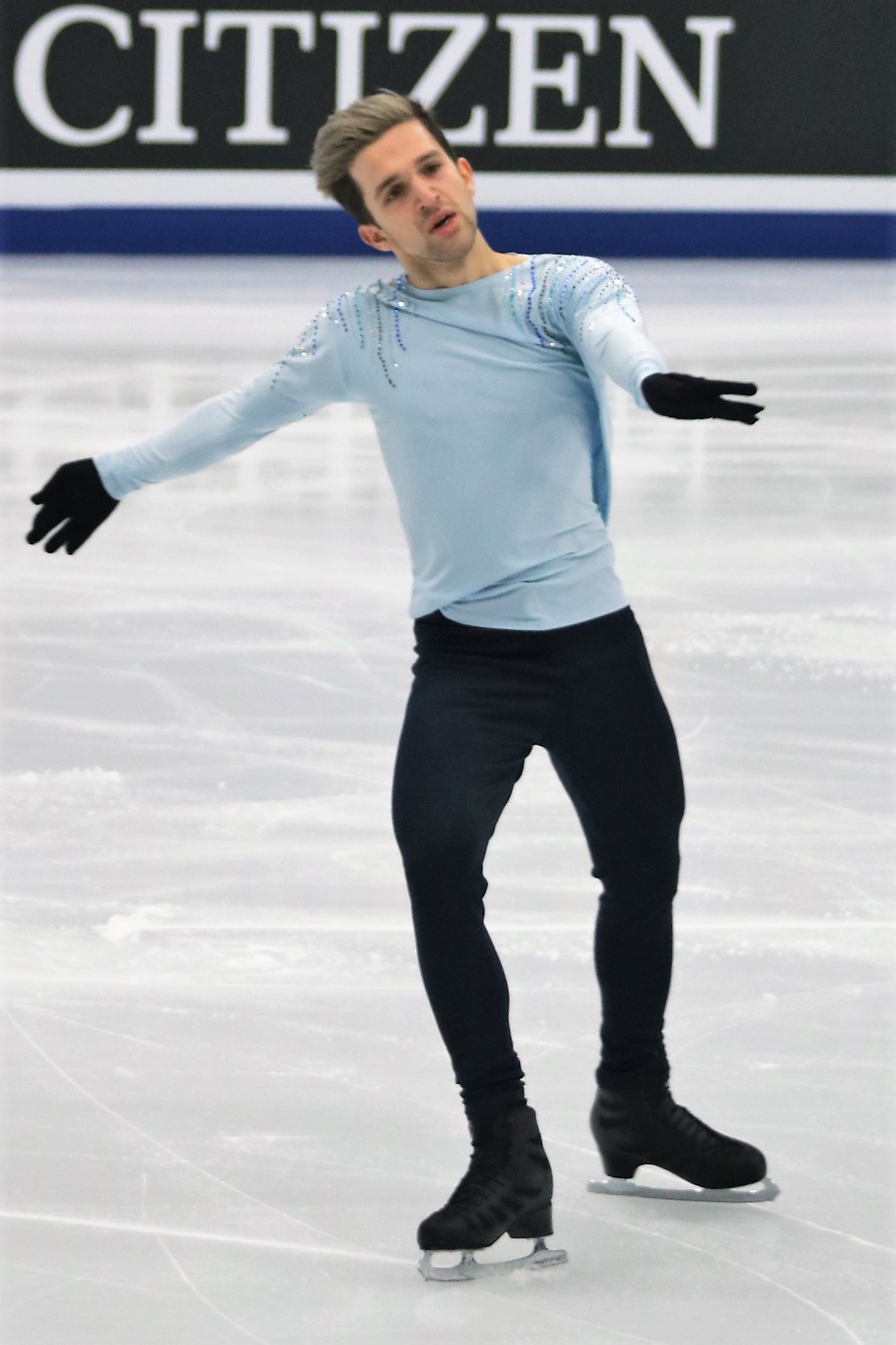
- Burak Demirboğa at the 2018 European Championships

Personal information
- Born: 7 June 1996 (age 30) Kocaeli, Turkey
- Height: 1.78 m (5 ft 10 in)

Figure skating career
- Country: Turkey
- Discipline: Men's singles
- Coach: Rana Belkıs Göçmen
- Skating club: Buz 41 Skating Club
- Began skating: 2002
- Retired: December 22, 2025

Medal record
Turkish Championships
Gold medal – first place	2018 Ankara	Singles
Gold medal – first place	2019 Kocaeli	Singles
Gold medal – first place	2020 Samsun	Singles
Gold medal – first place	2021 Ankara	Singles
Gold medal – first place	2022 Samsun	Singles
Gold medal – first place	2023 Ankara	Singles
Gold medal – first place	2024 Aralik	Singles
Silver medal – second place	2017 İzmir	Singles
Silver medal – second place	2026 Kocaeli	Singles
Bronze medal – third place	2016 İzmir	Singles
Bronze medal – third place	2025 Ankara	Singles

Burak Demirboğa (born 7 June 1996) is a retired Turkish figure skater. He has won three senior international medals and is a seven-time Turkish national champion (2018–24). He competed in the final segment at two European Championships (2018, 2020).

== Personal life ==
Demirboğa was born on 7 June 1996 in Kocaeli, Turkey. His older brother, Ali Demirboğa, has also competed in figure skating and contributes to his choreography.

== Career ==
=== Early years and junior international career ===
Demirboğa began learning to skate in 2002. His first junior international competition, the European Youth Olympic Festival, took place in February 2011 in Trabzon, Turkey. He debuted on the ISU Junior Grand Prix (JGP) series in September of the same year.

=== 2015–2016 and 2016–2017 seasons ===
Demirboğa's senior international debut came in December 2015 at the Santa Claus Cup in Hungary. He took bronze at the Turkish Championships. In January 2016, he won his first senior international medal – bronze at Skate Helena.

The following season, he became the Turkish national silver medalist.

=== 2017–2018 season ===
Demirboğa won the bronze medal at the Denkova-Staviski Cup in November 2017. In December, he won silver at the Istanbul Bosphorous Cup and then gold at the Turkish Championships; it was his first national title on the senior level. In January, he represented Turkey at his first ISU Championship – the 2018 European Championships in Moscow, Russia. He qualified to the free skate and finished 23rd overall. He was also named in Turkey's team to the 2018 World Championships in Milan, Italy, finishing twenty-eighth.

=== 2018–2019 season ===
Demirboğa began the season with finishing ninth at the 2018 CS Ondrej Nepela Trophy. He then went on to win his second consecutive title at the 2019 Turkish Championships.

Selected to compete at the 2019 European Championships in Minsk, Belarus, Demirboğa placed twenty-eighth. He also went on to win the bronze medal at the 2019 Dragon Trophy. Demirboğa ended his season with finishing thirtieth at the 2019 World Championships in Saitama, Japan.

=== 2019–20 season ===
Demirboğa started his season at the 2019 CS Nebelhorn Trophy, placing ninth. He also went on to win the bronze medal at the 2019 Halloween Cup.

At the 2020 Turkish Championships, Demirboğa won the gold medal. He then competed at the 2020 Sofia Trophy, winning the silver medal.

Competing at the 2020 European Championships in Graz, Austria, where he finished twenty-fourth.

While Demirboğa was assigned to compete at the 2020 World Championships in Montreal, Quebec, the event was ultimately cancelled due to rising concerns regarding the COVID-19 pandemic.

=== 2020–21 season ===
Demirboğa began the season with a tenth-place finish at the 2020 CS Nebelhorn Trophy, before going on to win the silver medal at the 2020 CS Budapest Trophy.

He then won his fourth national title at the 2021 Turkish Championships. Demirboğa ended the season at the 2021 International Challenge Cup, finishing sixth.

=== 2021–22 season ===
Demirboğa started the season by competing at the 2021 CS Nebelhorn Trophy, finishing ninth, before going on to compete at the 2021 CS Cup of Austria where he placed fourteenth.

At the 2022 Turkish Championships, Demirboğa won the gold medal. He then went on to compete at the 2021 CS Golden Spin of Zagreb, finishing seventeenth.

Demirboğa competed at the 2022 European Championships in Tallinn, Estonia, finishing twenty-third, before going on to compete at the 2022 Sofia Trophy where he placed fourth.

At the 2022 World Championships in Montpellier, France, Demirboğa finished twenty-eighth.

=== 2022–23 season ===
Beginning the season at the 2022 Cup of Nice, Demirboğa finished fourth. Going on to compete at the 2022 Denkova-Staviski Cup, Demirboğa won the gold medal.

At the 2022 Bosphorus Cup, Demirboğa won the silver medal. He then went on to win his sixth national title at the 2023 Turkish Championships.

Competing at the 2023 European Championships in Espoo, Finland, Demirboğa finished twentieth, before going on to compete at the 2023 World Championships in Saitama, Japan, where Demirboğa finished twenty-eighth.

== Programs ==
Season	Short program	Free skating
2025–26	LA TROMPETAS by Auto Beats choreo. by Adam Solya	Belle (from Notre-Dame de Paris) by Riccardo Cocciante choreo. by Ali Demirboga
2024–25	No Man No Cry by Jimmy Sax choreo. by Adam Solya	İnsan İnsan (People People) by Fazıl Say choreo. by Ali Demirboga
2023–24	Bones by Imagine Dragons choreo. by Adam Solya	Who Wants to Live Forever by Queen choreo. by Ali Demirboga
2022–23	No Man No Cry by Jimmy Sax	Moulin Rouge!: Nature Boy performed by David Bowie; The Show Must Go On performed by Jim Broadbent, Nicole Kidman
2021–22	No Man No Cry by Jimmy Sax	Diego, libre dans sa tête by Johnny Hallyday
2020–21	He Lives in You performed by Samuel E. Wright	Who Wants to Live Forever by Queen
2019–20	He Lives in You performed by Samuel E. Wright	Who Wants to Live Forever by Queen
2018–19	I'm Not the Only One by Sam Smith	You Raise Me Up performed by Josh Groban
2017–18	Another Love by Tom Odell	Grande amore
2014–15	Charleston Copenhagen	Ezel by Toygar Işıklı
2013–14	Mario (soundtrack)	Dubstep Violin by Lindsey Stirling
2012–13	Nostalgia by Yanni	Dubstep Violin by Lindsey Stirling
2011–12	Charlie Chaplin movies	

== Competitive highlights ==
- JGP – Event of the ISU Junior Grand Prix Series
- CS – Event of the ISU Challenger Series
- TBD – Assigned
- WD – Withdrew from competition
- C – Event was cancelled

Competition placements at senior level
Season	2015–16	2016–17	2017–18	2018–19	2019–20	2020–21	2021–22	2022–23	2023–24	2024–25	2025–26
World Championships			28th	30th	C		28th	28th	30th	38th	
European Championships			23rd	28th	24th		23rd	20th	26th		
Turkish Championships	3rd	2nd	1st	1st	1st	1st	1st	1st	1st	3rd	2nd
CS Budapest Trophy						2nd				9th	
CS Cup of Austria							14th				
CS Denis Ten Memorial									9th		
CS Golden Spin of Zagreb							17th				
CS Nebelhorn Trophy			22nd		9th	10th	9th			17th	
CS Nepela Memorial			12th	9th							
Bosphorus Cup			2nd	5th				2nd	2nd	2nd	6th
Challenge Cup						6th					
Cup of Nice			12th					4th			
Cup of Tyrol		18th	4th								
Denkova-Staviski Cup			3rd					1st	2nd	3rd	
Dragon Trophy				3rd							
Ephesus Cup									1st		
Halloween Cup					3rd						
Mentor Toruń Cup				5th							
Santa Claus Cup	12th	7th									
Skate Helena	3rd										
Skate to Milano											20th
Slovenia Open			4th								
Sofia Trophy					2nd		4th		2nd		
Winter Universiade		21st		14th							

Competition placements at junior level
Season	2010–11	2011–12	2012–13	2013–14	2014–15
Turkish Championships				1st	
JGP Austria		21st			
JGP Croatia					23rd
JGP Czech Republic				20th	
JGP Turkey			18th		
European Youth Olympic Festival	13th				
Crystal Skate of Romania			10th		
Denkova-Staviski Cup				7th	
Hellmut Seibt Memorial				16th	
Istanbul Cup		3rd			
Sarajevo Open				3rd	
Triglav Trophy	10th	12th	6th		

== Detailed results ==
ISU personal best scores in the +5/-5 GOE System
Segment	Type	Score	Event
Total	TSS	213.39	2020 CS Budapest Trophy
Short program	TSS	73.56	2021 CS Nebelhorn Trophy
Short program	TES	39.46	2021 CS Nebelhorn Trophy
Short program	PCS	34.10	2021 CS Nebelhorn Trophy
Free skating	TSS	142.50	2020 CS Budapest Trophy
Free skating	TES	76.90	2020 CS Budapest Trophy
Free skating	PCS	68.92	2021 CS Nebelhorn Trophy

ISU personal best scores in the +3/-3 GOE System
Segment	Type	Score	Event
Total	TSS	181.24	2017 CS Ondrej Nepela Trophy
Short program	TSS	65.43	2018 World Championships
Short program	TES	36.54	2018 World Championships
Short program	PCS	28.89	2018 World Championships
Free skating	TSS	116.28	2017 CS Ondrej Nepela Trophy
Free skating	TES	57.38	2017 CS Ondrej Nepela Trophy
Free skating	PCS	58.90	2017 CS Ondrej Nepela Trophy

=== Senior level ===
Results in the 2024–25 season
Date	Event	SP		FS		Total	
Date	Event	P	Score	P	Score	P	Score
Sep 19–21, 2024	(Germany) 2024 CS Nebelhorn Trophy	17	59.98	15	117.92	17	177.90
Oct 11–13, 2024	(Hungary) 2024 CS Budapest Trophy	10	55.02	9	111.60	9	166.62
Nov 5–10, 2024	(Bulgaria) 2024 Denkova-Staviski Cup	2	71.21	4	139.85	3	211.06
Nov 28 – Dec 1, 2024	(Turkey) 2024 Bosphorus Cup	2	73.78	2	142.21	2	215.99
Dec 19-22, 2024	(Turkey) 2025 Turkish Championships	3	57.51	3	122.60	3	180.11

Results in the 2025–26 season
Date	Event	SP		FS		Total	
Date	Event	P	Score	P	Score	P	Score
Sep 18–21, 2025	(China) 2025 ISU Skate to Milano	19	61.02	22	102.95	20	163.97
Nov 24-30, 2025	(Turkey) 2025 Bosphorus Cup	4	63.39	6	98.30	6	161.69
December 19-21, 2025	(Turkey) 2026 Turkish Championships	2	70.18	2	116.59	2	186.77
