= Denkova-Staviski Cup =

International figure skating competition

- Status: Active
- Genre: International competition
- Frequency: Annual
- Venue: Winter Sports Palace
- Location: Sofia
- Country: Bulgaria
- Inaugurated: 2012
- Previous event: 2025
- Next event: 2026
- Organizer: Bulgarian Skating Federation; Denkova-Staviski Figure Skating Club

The Denkova-Staviski Cup is an annual figure skating competition sanctioned by the International Skating Union (ISU), organized and hosted by the Bulgarian Skating Federation (Bulgarian: Българска федерация по фигурно пързаляне) and the Denkova-Staviski Skating Club (Bulgarian: Кънки клуб Денкова - Стависки) at the Winter Sports Palace in Sofia, Bulgaria. The competition debuted in 2012 and is named in honor of Albena Denkova and Maxim Staviski, who competed internationally in ice dance for Bulgaria.

Medals may be awarded in men's singles, women's singles, and ice dance at the senior and junior levels, although not every discipline is held every year. Misha Ge of Uzbekistan holds the record for winning the most Denkova-Staviski Cup titles in men's singles (with three), while Alexandra Feigin of Bulgaria holds the record in women's singles (with four).

== History ==
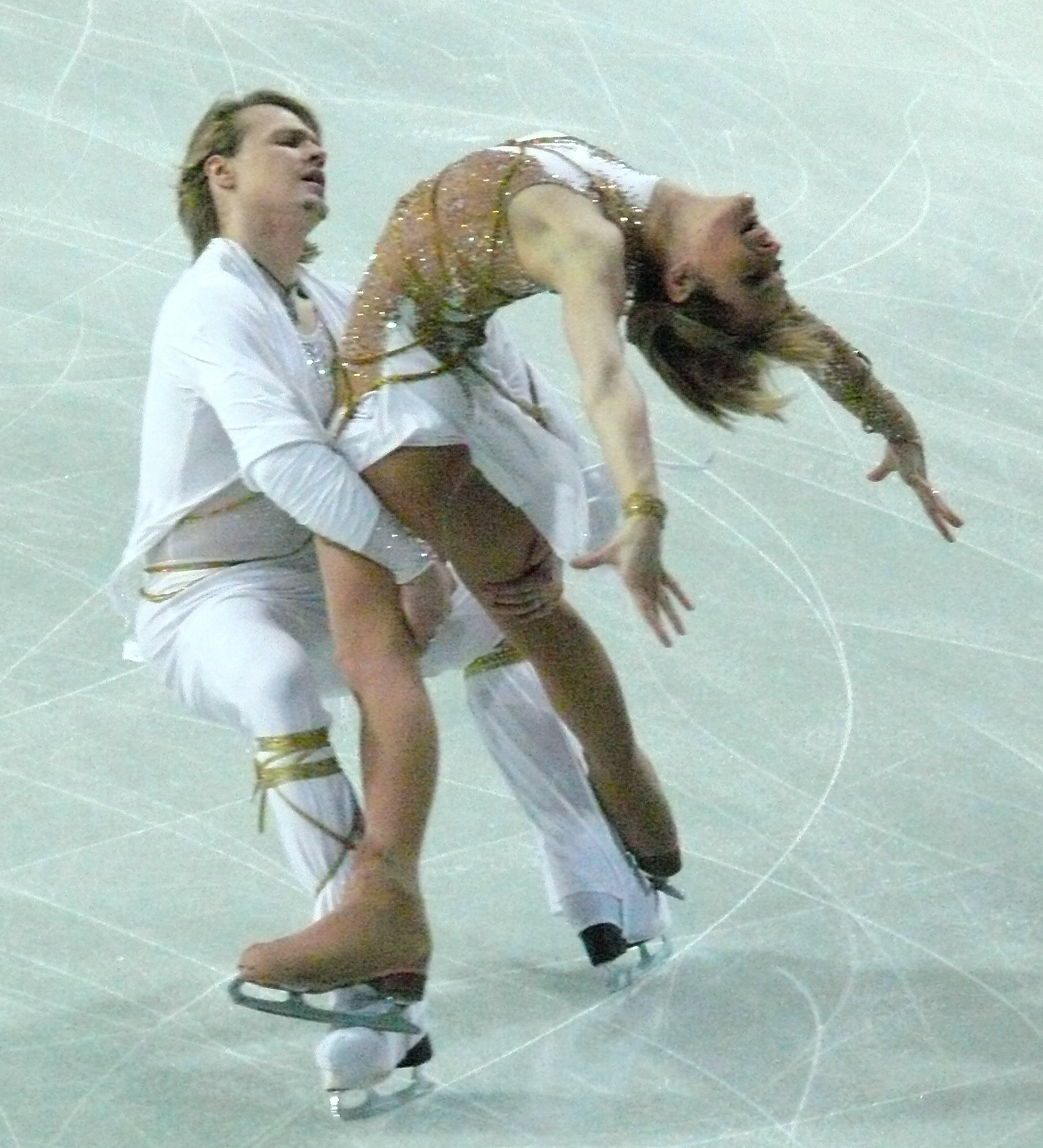
Albena Denkova and Maxim Staviski compete at the 2007 European Championships.

The Denkova-Staviski Cup is named in honor of Albena Denkova and Maxim Staviski, figure skaters who competed internationally in ice dance for Bulgaria. Denkova and Staviski are two-time World Championship gold medalists (2006–07), two-time European Championship silver medalists (2003–04), and eleven-time Bulgarian national champions (1997–2007). They were the first skaters from Bulgaria to win medals at an International Skating Union (ISU) championship event (the 2003 European Championships), as well as the first skaters from Bulgaria to win gold medals at the World Figure Skating Championships (in 2006). Having spoken about the lack of skating facilities and coaches in Bulgaria, Denkova and Staviski opened a skating club in 2003 in Sofia: the Denkova-Staviski Skating Club. They retired from competitive skating in 2007. Georgi Parvanov, President of Bulgaria, bestowed upon Denkova and Staviski the Order of Stara Planina, the highest recognition that Bulgarian civilians can receive, in April 2007 for their contributions to sport in Bulgaria.

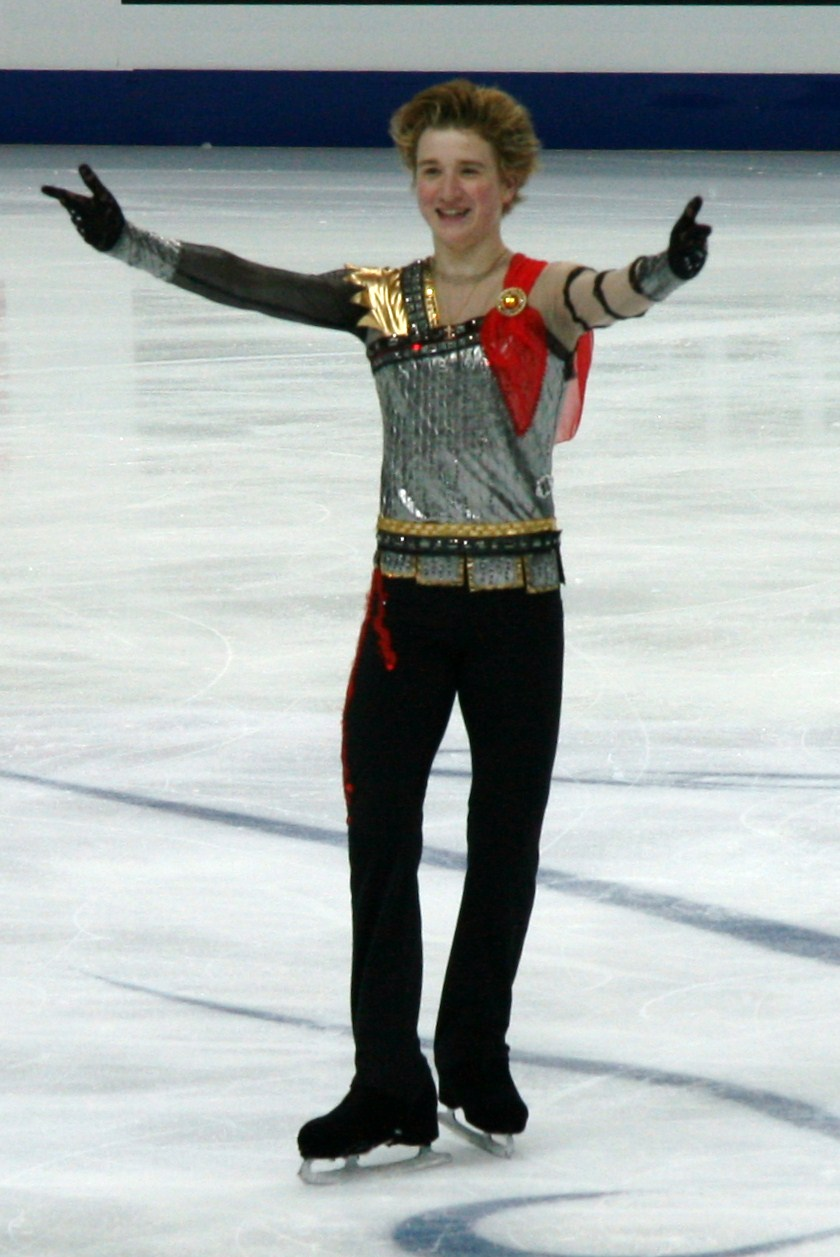
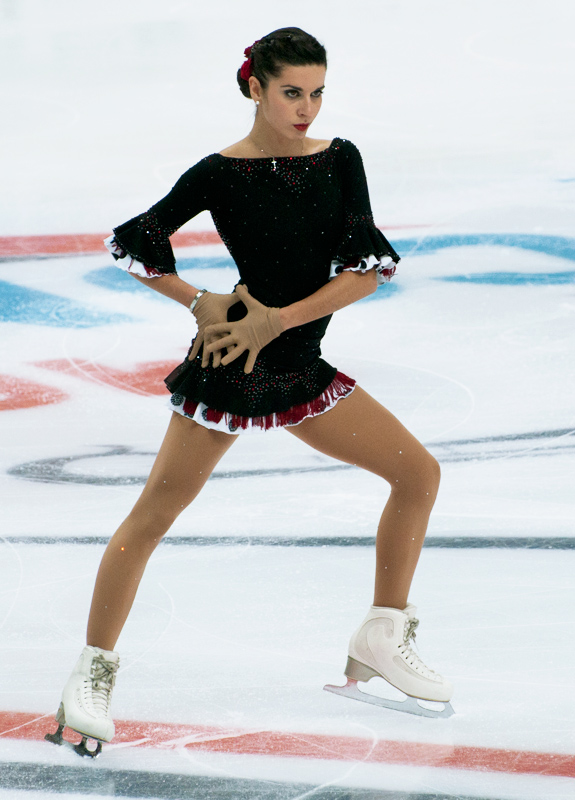
The inaugural Denkova-Staviski Cup champions: Misha Ge of Uzbekistan (men's singles) and Valentina Marchei of Italy (women's singles)

The Denkova-Staviski Cup was held for the first time in 2012 at the Winter Sports Palace in Sofia. Misha Ge of Uzbekistan won the men's event and Valentina Marchei of Italy won the women's event. In 2015, the Denkova-Staviski Cup was the sixth event of the ISU Challenger Series, a series of international figure skating competitions sanctioned by the International Skating Union and organized by ISU member nations. The objective is to ensure consistent organization and structure within a series of international competitions linked together, providing opportunities for senior-level skaters to compete at the international level and also earn points towards the World Standings and Season's World Ranking. The Denkova-Staviski Cup has been held every year since 2012, except for 2020 and 2021, when it was cancelled due to the COVID-19 pandemic.

== Senior medalists ==
The 2026 Denkova-Staviski Cup champions (from left to right): Viktoriia Safonova of Belarus (women's singles), and Giulia Isabella Paolino and Andrea Tuba of Italy (ice dance)
Not pictured: Daniil Samsonov of Russia (men's singles)

CS: Challenger Series event

=== Men's singles ===
Senior men's event medalists
Year	Gold	Silver	Bronze	Ref.
2012	(Uzbekistan) Misha Ge	(Italy) Maurizio Zandron	(Bulgaria) Manol Atanassov	
2013	(Uzbekistan) Misha Ge	(France) Chafik Besseghier	(France) Noël-Antoine Pierre	
2014	(Italy) Matteo Rizzo	(Denmark) Justus Strid	(Italy) Adrien Bannister	
2015 CS	(Uzbekistan) Misha Ge	(Malaysia) Julian Yee	(Italy) Matteo Rizzo	
2016	(Italy) Maurizio Zandron	(United Kingdom) Graham Newberry	(Italy) Dario Betti	
2017	(France) Kévin Aymoz	(Turkey) Başar Oktar	(Turkey) Burak Demirboğa	
2018	(Italy) Matteo Rizzo	(Bulgaria) Nicky-Leo Obreykov	(Norway) Sondre Oddvoll Bøe	
2019	(Austria) Maurizio Zandron	(United Kingdom) Graham Newberry	(Italy) Mattia Dalla Torre	
2020	Competitions cancelled due to the COVID-19 pandemic			
2021	Competitions cancelled due to the COVID-19 pandemic			
2022	(Turkey) Burak Demirboğa	(Turkey) Başar Oktar	(Kazakhstan) Dias Jirenbayev	
2023	(Austria) Maurizio Zandron	(Turkey) Burak Demirboğa	(Bulgaria) Alexander Zlatkov	
2024	(Israel) Lev Vinokur	(Austria) Maurizio Zandron	(Turkey) Burak Demirboğa	
2025	(Israel) Tamir Kuperman	(Turkey) Alp Eren Özkan	(Czech Republic) Tadeas Vaclavik	
2026	(Individual Neutral Athletes) Daniil Samsonov	(France) Corentin Spinar	(Individual Neutral Athletes) Alex Labovich	

=== Women's singles ===
Senior women's event medalists
Year	Gold	Silver	Bronze	Ref.
2012	(Italy) Valentina Marchei	(Italy) Francesca Rio	(Italy) Roberta Rodeghiero	
2013	(Italy) Roberta Rodeghiero	(Sweden) Joshi Helgesson	(Italy) Francesca Rio	
2014	(Denmark) Pernille Sorensen	(Luxembourg) Fleur Maxwell	(Italy) Micol Cristini	
2015 CS	(Sweden) Isabelle Olsson	(Latvia) Angelīna Kučvaļska	(Norway) Anne Line Gjersem	
2016	(Austria) Natalie Klotz	(United Kingdom) Kristen Spours	(United Kingdom) Anna Litvinenko	
2017	(Italy) Micol Cristini	(France) Léa Serna	(United Kingdom) Natasha McKay	
2018	(Bulgaria) Alexandra Feigin	(Italy) Lucrezia Gennaro	(Italy) Sara Conti	
2019	(Bulgaria) Alexandra Feigin	(United Kingdom) Natasha McKay	(Italy) Chenny Paolucci	
2020	Competitions cancelled due to the COVID-19 pandemic			
2021	Competitions cancelled due to the COVID-19 pandemic			
2022	(Bulgaria) Alexandra Feigin	(Norway) Mia Risa Gomez	(Italy) Elena Agostinelli	
2023	(Bulgaria) Alexandra Feigin	(Ukraine) Anastasia Gozhva	(United Kingdom) Nina Povey	
2024	(United Kingdom) Kristen Spours	(Bulgaria) Alexandra Feigin	(Italy) Carlotta Maria Gardini	
2025	(Spain) Ariadna Gupta Espada	(Bulgaria) Alexandra Feigin	(Italy) Elena Agostinelli	
2026	(Individual Neutral Athletes) Viktoriia Safonova	(South Africa) Gian-Quen Isaacs	(Bulgaria) Alexandra Feigin	

=== Pairs ===
Senior pairs event medalists
Year	Gold	Silver	Bronze	Ref.
2012	No pairs competition			
2013	(France); Vanessa James; Morgan Ciprès	No other competitors		
No pairs competitions since 2013

=== Ice dance ===
Senior ice dance event medalists
Year	Gold	Silver	Bronze	Ref.
No ice dance competitions prior to 2015
2015 CS	(Turkey); Alisa Agafonova; Alper Uçar	(Belarus); Viktoria Kavaliova; Yurii Bieliaiev	(Russia); Ludmila Sosnitskaia; Pavel Golovishnikov	
2016–23	No ice dance competitions			
2024	(Slovakia); Mária Sofia Pucherová; Nikita Lysak	(Italy); Victoria Manni; Carlo Röthlisberger	(Ukraine); Zoe Larson; Andrii Kapran	
2025	(Italy); Victoria Manni; Carlo Röthlisberger	(Ukraine); Zoe Larson; Andrii Kapran	(China); Ren Junfei; Xing Jianing	
2026	(Italy); Giulia Isabella Paolino; Andrea Tuba	(Individual Neutral Athletes); Vasilisa Grigoreva; Evgenii Artiushchenko	(Individual Neutral Athletes); Elizaveta Shichina; Pavel Drozd	

== Junior medalists ==
=== Men's singles ===
Junior men's event medalists
Year	Gold	Silver	Bronze	Ref.
2012	(Bulgaria) Ivo Gatovski	(Malaysia) Bryan Christopher Tan	(Turkey) Oguzhan Selimoglu	
2013	(Latvia) Deniss Vasiļjevs	(Russia) Alexei Krasnozhon	(Italy) Matteo Rizzo	
2014	(Italy) Marco Bozzuto	(Ukraine) Mikhail Medunitsa	(Bulgaria) Ivo Gatovski	
2015	(Russia) Leonid Sviridenko	(Italy) Marko Bozzuto	(Turkey) Başar Oktar	
2016	(Italy) Gabriele Frangipani	(Turkey) Başar Oktar	(Bulgaria) Nikola Zlatanov	
2017	(Republic of Ireland) Samuel Mcallister	(France) Tom Bouvart	(Bulgaria) Vassil Dimitrov	
2018	(Bulgaria) Tobija Harms	No other competitors		
2019	(Bulgaria) Vassil Dimitrov	(United Kingdom) Connor Bray	(Italy) Matteo Nalbone	
2020	Competitions cancelled due to the COVID-19 pandemic			
2021	Competitions cancelled due to the COVID-19 pandemic			
2022	(Israel) Michael Moshaev	(Bulgaria) Rosen Peev	(Bulgaria) Alexander Kachamakov	
2023	(Israel) Tamir Kuperman	(Bulgaria) Deyan Mihaylov	(Ukraine) Mark Kulish	
2024	(France) Ilia Gogitidze	(Ukraine) Yehor Kurtsev	(United Kingdom) Jack Donovan	
2025	(China) Li Yingrui	(Czech Republic) Jakub Tykal	(Bulgaria) Deyan Mihaylov	
2026	(Czech Republic) Jakub Tykal	(Individual Neutral Athletes) Pavel Gavdis	(United Kingdom) Edward Solovyov	

=== Women's singles ===
Junior women's event medalists
Year	Gold	Silver	Bronze	Ref.
2012	(Bulgaria) Anna Afonkina	(Turkey) Melisa Sema Atik	(Serbia) Sandra Ristivojević	
2013	(Russia) Ekaterina Vysotina	(Russia) Bogdana Lukashevich	(Italy) Micol Cristini	
2014	(Italy) Rebecca Ghilardi	(Turkey) Zeynep Dilruba Sanoglu	(Bulgaria) Teodora Markova	
2015	(Russia) Alisa Lozko	(Germany) Lea Johanna Dastich	(France) Pauline Wanner	
2016	(Bulgaria) Alexandra Feigin	(Singapore) Céciliane Hartmann	(Turkey) Ilayda Bayar	
2017	(Bulgaria) Alexandra Feigin	(Austria) Olga Mikutina	(Finland) Sofia Sula	
2018	(Italy) Lucrezia Beccari	(Bulgaria) Maria Levushkina	(Italy) Federica Grandesso	
2019	(Bulgaria) Maria Levushkina	(Bulgaria) Ivelina Baicheva	(Bulgaria) Maria Manova	
2020	Competitions cancelled due to the COVID-19 pandemic			
2021	Competitions cancelled due to the COVID-19 pandemic			
2022	(Bulgaria) Chiara Hristova	(Turkey) Fatma Yade Karlikli	(Turkey) Anna Deniz Ozdemir	
2023	(Bulgaria) Chiara Hristova	(Italy) Matilde Petracchi	(Bulgaria) Lia Lyubenova	
2024	(Estonia) Elina Goidina	(Latvia) Kira Baranovska	(Cyprus) Varvara Abramkina	
2025	(Estonia) Elina Goidina	(Italy) Beatrice Soldati	(Bulgaria) Lia Lyubenova	
2026	(Individual Neutral Athletes) Yaraslava Kniazeva	(Individual Neutral Athletes) Varvara Stahovich	(Italy) Beatrice Soldati	

=== Pairs ===
Junior pairs event medalists
Year	Gold	Silver	Bronze	Ref.
2012	No junior pairs competition			
2013	(Italy); Bianca Manacorda; Niccolò Macii	(Hong Kong); Marin Ono; Hon Lam To	No other competitors	
No junior pairs competitions since 2013

=== Ice dance ===
Junior ice dance event medalists
Year	Gold	Silver	Bronze	Ref.
No junior ice dance competitions prior to 2015
2015	(Russia); Anastasia Shpilevaya; Grigory Smirnov	(Hungary); Kimberly Wei; Iliász Fourati	(Bulgaria); Yana Bozhilova; Kaloyan Georgiev	
2016–23	No junior ice dance competitions			
2024	(Turkey); Irma Yucel; Danil Pak	(Ukraine); Tetiana Bielodonova; Ivan Kachur	(Poland); Zofia Grzegorzewska; Oleg Muratov	
2025	(Ukraine); Iryna Pidgaina; Artem Koval	(Italy); Zoe Bianchi; Daniel Basile	(Italy); Arianna Soldati; Nicholas Tagliabue	
2026	(Italy); Arianna Soldati; Nicholas Tagliabue	(Individual Neutral Athletes); Polina Zharova; Aleksei Stoliarov	(France); Kira Listkova; Tahory Taddei-Dugue	

== Records ==
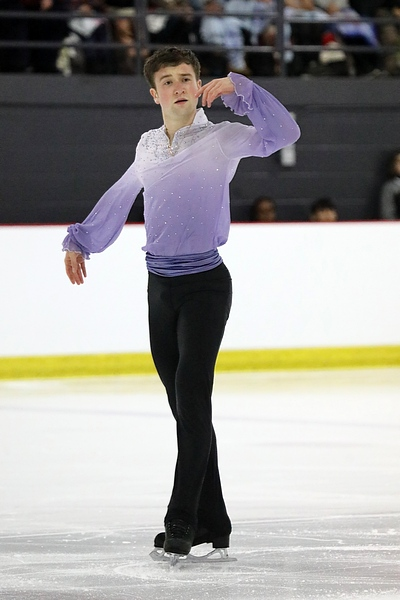
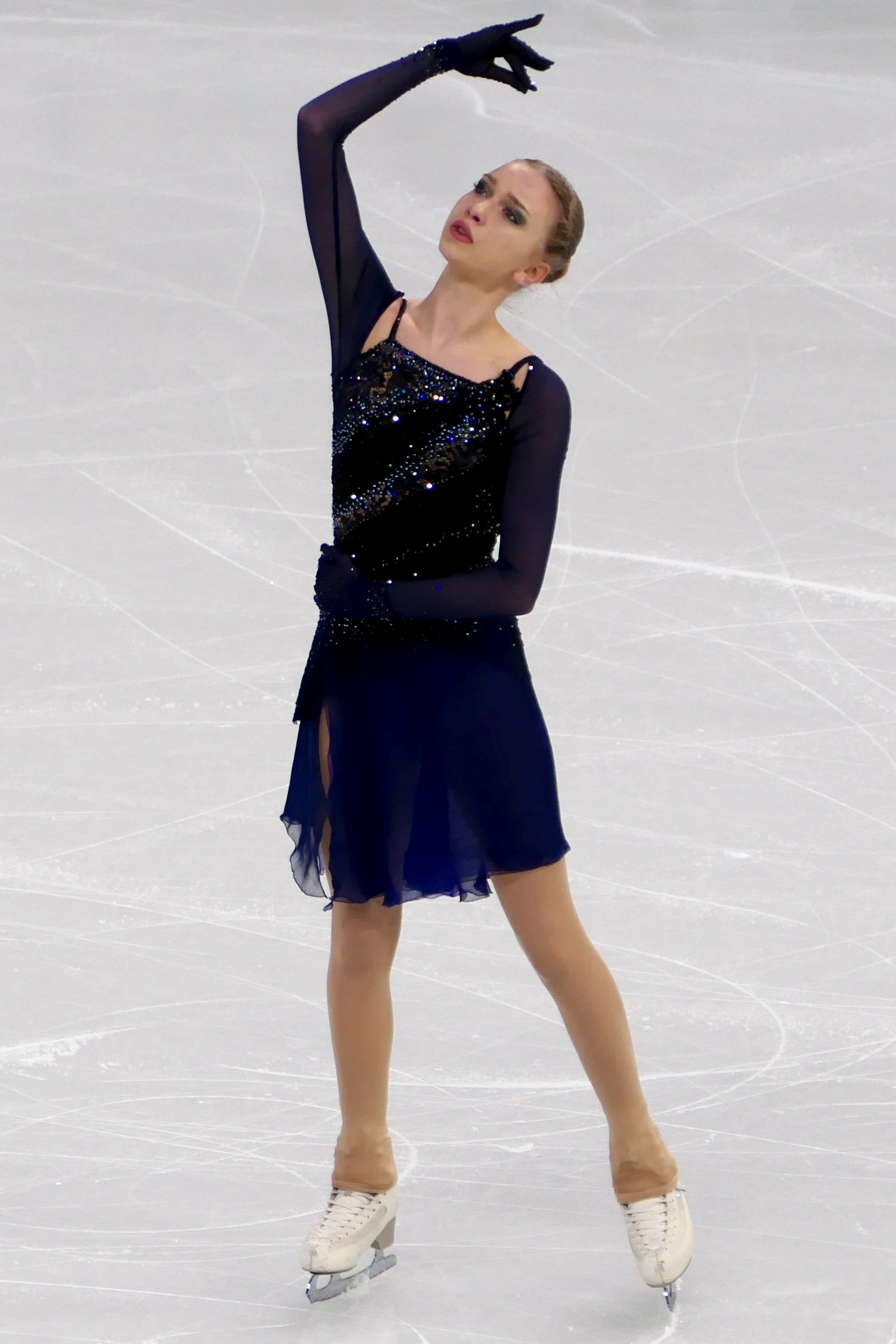
From left to right: Misha Ge of Uzbekistan has won three Denkova-Staviski Cup titles in men's singles, while Alexandra Feigin of Bulgaria has won four Denkova-Staviski Cup titles in women's singles.

Records
Discipline	Most titles			
Discipline	Skater(s)	No.	Years	Ref.
Men's singles	(Uzbekistan) Misha Ge	3	2012–13; 2015	
Women's singles	(Bulgaria) Alexandra Feigin	4	2018–19; 2022–23	

== Cumulative medal count (senior medalists) ==
=== Men's singles ===
Total number of Denkova-Staviski Cup medals in men's singles by nation
Rank	Nation	Gold	Silver	Bronze	Total
1	Italy	3	1	4	8
2	Uzbekistan	3	0	0	3
3	Austria	2	1	0	3
4	Israel	2	0	0	2
5	Turkey	1	4	2	7
6	France	1	2	1	4
7	Individual Neutral Athletes	1	0	1	2
8	Great Britain	0	2	0	2
9	Bulgaria	0	1	2	3
10	Denmark	0	1	0	1
10	Malaysia	0	1	0	1
12	Czech Republic	0	0	1	1
12	Kazakhstan	0	0	1	1
12	Norway	0	0	1	1
Totals (14 entries)		13	13	13	39

=== Women's singles ===
Total number of Denkova-Staviski Cup medals in women's singles by nation
Rank	Nation	Gold	Silver	Bronze	Total
1	Bulgaria	4	2	1	7
2	Italy	3	2	8	13
3	Great Britain	1	2	3	6
4	Sweden	1	1	0	2
5	Austria	1	0	0	1
5	Denmark	1	0	0	1
5	Individual Neutral Athletes	1	0	0	1
5	Spain	1	0	0	1
9	Norway	0	1	1	2
10	France	0	1	0	1
10	Latvia	0	1	0	1
10	Luxembourg	0	1	0	1
10	South Africa	0	1	0	1
10	Ukraine	0	1	0	1
Totals (14 entries)		13	13	13	39

=== Ice dance ===
Total number of Denkova-Staviski Cup medals in ice dance by nation
Rank	Nation	Gold	Silver	Bronze	Total
1	Italy	2	1	0	3
2	Slovakia	1	0	0	1
2	Turkey	1	0	0	1
4	Individual Neutral Athletes	0	1	1	2
4	Ukraine	0	1	1	2
6	Belarus	0	1	0	1
7	China	0	0	1	1
7	Russia	0	0	1	1
Totals (8 entries)		4	4	4	12

=== Total medals ===
This table includes one gold medal win by Vanessa James and Morgan Ciprès of France in pair skating in 2013: the only pairs entrants in the competition that year.

Total number of Denkova-Staviski Cup medals by nation
Rank	Nation	Gold	Silver	Bronze	Total
1	Italy	8	4	12	24
2	Bulgaria	4	4	3	11
3	Austria	3	1	0	4
4	Uzbekistan	3	0	0	3
5	Turkey	2	4	2	8
6	France	2	3	1	6
7	Individual Neutral Athletes	2	1	2	5
8	Israel	2	0	0	2
9	Great Britain	1	4	3	8
10	Denmark	1	1	0	2
10	Sweden	1	1	0	2
12	Slovakia	1	0	0	1
12	Spain	1	0	0	1
14	Ukraine	0	2	1	3
15	Norway	0	1	2	3
16	Latvia	0	1	0	1
16	Luxembourg	0	1	0	1
16	Malaysia	0	1	0	1
16	South Africa	0	1	0	1
20	China	0	0	1	1
20	Czech Republic	0	0	1	1
20	Kazakhstan	0	0	1	1
20	Russia	0	0	1	1
Totals (23 entries)		31	30	30	91
