= Bosphorus Cup (figure skating) =

International figure skating competition

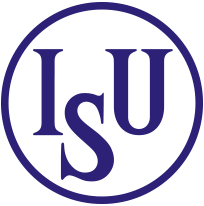
- Location: Turkey

The Bosphorus Cup (formerly called the Istanbul Cup) is an international figure skating competition held in December in Istanbul, Turkey. Medals may be awarded in men's singles, women's singles, and ice dance at the senior, junior, and novice levels.

== Senior results ==
=== Men's singles ===
Year	Gold	Silver	Bronze	Ref.
2011	(Kazakhstan) Denis Ten	(Uzbekistan) Misha Ge	(Monaco) Kim Lucine	
2018	(Georgia (country)) Morisi Kvitelashvili	(Ukraine) Ivan Shmuratko	(Turkey) Başar Oktar	
2019	(Russia) Mark Kondratyuk	(Turkey) Başar Oktar	(Austria) Maurizio Zandron	
2022	(Azerbaijan) Vladimir Litvintsev	(Turkey) Burak Demirboğa	(Turkey) Alp Eren Özkan	
2023	(Azerbaijan) Vladimir Litvintsev	(Turkey) Burak Demirboğa	(Kazakhstan) Rakhat Bralin	
2024	(Azerbaijan) Vladimir Litvintsev	(Turkey) Burak Demirboğa	(Turkey) Alp Eren Özkan	
2025	(Turkey) Alp Eren Özkan	(Kazakhstan) Nikita Krivosheyev	(Czech Republic) Tadeas Vaclavik	

=== Women's singles ===
Year	Gold	Silver	Bronze	Ref.
2011	(Slovenia) Patricia Gleščič	(Luxembourg) Fleur Maxwell	(Belgium) Isabelle Pieman	
2018	(Philippines) Alisson Krystle Perticheto	(Italy) Lara Naki Gutmann	(Netherlands) Niki Wories	
2019	(Austria) Olga Mikutina	(Georgia (country)) Alina Urushadze	(Turkey) Güzide Irmak Bayır	
2022	(Moldova) Anastasia Gracheva	(Romania) Julia Sauter	(Czech Republic) Eliška Březinová	
2023	(Chinese Taipei) Tzu-Han Ting	(Lithuania) Meda Variakojytė	(Czech Republic) Eliška Březinová	
2024	(Bulgaria) Alexandra Feigin	(Moldova) Anastasia Gracheva	(Czech Republic) Eliška Březinová	
2025	(Azerbaijan) Nargiz Süleymanova	(India) Tara Prasad	(Slovenia) Julija Lovrenčič	

=== Ice dance ===
Year	Gold	Silver	Bronze	Ref.
2011	(Azerbaijan); Julia Zlobina; Alexei Sitnikov	(Russia); Valeria Starygina; Ivan Volobuiev	(Germany); Tanja Kolbe; Stefano Caruso	
2018	(Russia); Sofia Evdokimova; Egor Bazin	(Germany); Shari Koch; Christian Nuchtern	(France); Adelina Galyavieva; Louis Thauron	
2019	(Poland); Natalia Kaliszek; Maksym Spodyriev	(Ukraine); Oleksandra Nazarova; Maksym Nikitin	(Russia); Sofia Evdokimova; Egor Bazin	
2022	(Poland); Anastasia Polibina; Pavel Golovishnikov	(Ukraine); Mariia Pinchuk; Mykyta Pogorielov	(France); Lou Terreaux; Noé Perron	
2023	(France); Marie Dupayage; Thomas Nabais	(Switzerland); Gina Zehnder; Beda Leon Sieber	(Spain); Sofía Val; Asaf Kazimov	
2024	(France); Marie Dupayage; Thomas Nabais	(Lithuania); Paulina Ramanauskaite; Deividas Kizala	(Ukraine); Zoe Larson; Andrii Kapran	
2025	(Cyprus); Angelina Kudryavtseva; Ilia Karankevich	(Ukraine); Mariia Pinchuk; Mykyta Pogorielov	(Georgia (country)); Maria Kazakova; Vladislav Kasinskij	

== Junior results ==
=== Men's singles ===
Year	Gold	Silver	Bronze	Ref.
2011	(Turkey) Engin Ali Artan	(Romania) Vlad Ionescu	(Turkey) Burak Demirboga	
2018	(Russia) Mark Kondratiuk	(Kazakhstan) Mikhail Shaidorov	(Ukraine) Serhii Sokolov	
2019	(Russia) Grigory Fedorov	(Turkey) Alp Eren Özkan	(Poland) Egor Khlopkov	
2022	(Georgia (country)) Konstantin Supatashvili	(Turkey) Furkan Emre İncel	(Kazakhstan) Oleg Melnikov	
2023	(Turkey) Ali Efe Günes	(Georgia (country)) Konstantin Supatashvili	(Turkey) Furkan Emre İncel	
2024	(Ukraine) Yehor Kurtsev	(Kazakhstan) Nikita Krivosheyev	(Turkey) Furkan Emre İncel	
2025	(Ukraine) Yehor Kurtsev	(Georgia (country)) Konstantin Supatashvili	(Turkey) Furkan Emre İncel	

=== Women's singles ===
Year	Gold	Silver	Bronze	Ref.
2011	(Turkey) Sıla Saygı	(Belgium) Anais Claes	(Grenada) Oliya Clarkson	
2018	(Ukraine) Anastasiia Arkhipova	(Georgia (country)) Alina Urushadze	(Italy) Ester Schwarz	
2019	(Russia) Sofia Baranova	(Ukraine) Nicole Nayda	(Kazakhstan) Sofia Farafonova	
2022	(Latvia) Nikola Fomchenkova	(Georgia (country)) Inga Gurgenidze	(Cyprus) Stefania Yakovleva	
2023	(Georgia (country)) Inga Gurgenidze	(France) Stefania Gladki	(Czech Republic) Barbora Tykalová	
2024	(Serbia) Alicia Lengyelova	(Georgia (country)) Inga Gurgenidze	(Latvia) Kira Baranovska	
2025	(France) Stefania Gladki	(Georgia (country)) Inga Gurgenidze	(Slovakia) Olivia Lengyelova	

=== Ice dance ===
Year	Gold	Silver	Bronze	Ref.
2011	(Russia); Valeria Zenkova; Valerie Sinitsin	(Russia); Evgenia Kosigina; Nikolai Moroshkin	(Turkey); Cagla Demirsal; Berk Akalin	
2018	(Italy); Francesca Righi; Aleksei Dubrovin	(Italy); Carolina Portesi Peroni; Michael Chrastecky	(Germany); Charise Matthaei; Maximilian Pfisterer	
2019	(Ukraine); Mariia Holubtsova; Kyryl Bielobrov	(Russia); Elizaveta Shichina; Gordey Khubulov	(Russia); Angelina Lazareva; Maksim Prokofev	
2022	(Cyprus); Angelina Kudryavtseva; Ilia Karankevich	(Poland); Sofiia Dovhal; Wiktor Kulesza	(Ukraine); Iryna Pidgaina; Artem Koval	
2023	(Ukraine); Iryna Pidgaina; Artem Koval	(Czech Republic); Andrea Psurna; Jáchym Novák	(Turkey); Irmak Yucel; Danil Pak	
2024	(Ukraine); Iryna Pidgaina; Artem Koval	(France); Louise Bordet; Martin Chardain	(Slovakia); Aneta Václavíková; Ivan Morozov	
2025	(Italy); Arianna Soldati; Nicholas Tagliabue	(Germany); Mia Lee Mayer; Atl Ongay-Perez	(France); Lou Koch; Lucas Chataignoux	
