= Engin Ali Artan =

Turkish figure skater

Personal information
- Born: 12 September 1992 (age 34) Kocaeli, Turkey
- Home town: Ankara, Turkey
- Height: 1.74 m (5 ft 8 1/2 in)

Figure skating career
- Country: Turkey
- Discipline: Men's singles
- Began skating: 2000

Medal record
Turkish Championships
Gold medal – first place	2015 Ankara	Singles
Gold medal – first place	2016 Izmir	Singles
Gold medal – first place	2017 Izmir	Singles
Silver medal – second place	2018 Ankara	Singles
Bronze medal – third place	2013 Ankara	Singles
Bronze medal – third place	2014 Istanbul	Singles

Engin Ali Artan (born 12 September 1992) is a Turkish figure skater. He is a three-time Turkish national champion and the 2015 Sarajevo Open champion.

== Programs ==
Season	Short program	Free skating
2016-17	Nessun Dorma Giacomo Puccini	The Mission (soundtrack) by Ennio Morricone
2015–16	Melodrama by Andrea Bocelli	Moulin Rouge!; Your Song; Come What May
2014–15	Primavera Porteña (from Estaciones Porteñas) by Astor Piazzolla	Otoñal by Raúl Di Blasio
2011–12	Protectors of the Earth (from Invincible) by Two Steps from Hell	
2010–11	Armageddon	Sihirbaz (The Illusionist)
2008–10	Gladiator by Hans Zimmer	The Man in the Iron Mask by Nick Glennie-Smith
2007–08	Irish medley by Edvin Marton	

== Competitive highlights ==
- JGP – Event of the ISU Junior Grand Prix Series
- CS – Event of the ISU Challenger Series

Competition placements at senior level
Season	2010–11	2011–12	2012–13	2013–14	2014–15	2015–16	2016–17	2017–18
European Championships					27th	35th	32nd	
Turkish Championships		2nd	3rd	3rd	1st	1st	1st	2nd
CS Ondrej Nepela Trophy								16th
Bosphorus Cup								1st
Crystal Skate of Romania			10th					
Cup of Nice								13th
Cup of Tyrol							20th	10th
Merano Cup					5th			
Santa Claus Cup						11th	11th	
Sarajevo Open					1st			
Slovenia Open								5th
Triglav Trophy		11th						
Winter Universiade	21st				22nd			

Competition placements at junior level
Season	2007–08	2008–09	2009–10	2010–11	2011–12
World Junior Championships	46th	31st		40th	
Turkish Championships				1st	
JGP Belarus		20th	17th		
JGP Germany				23rd	
JGP Romania				16th	16th
JGP Turkey			19th		
European Youth Olympic Festival		10th			
Istanbul Cup					1st
Triglav Trophy	3rd			2nd	

== Detailed results ==
ISU personal best scores in the +3/-3 GOE System
Segment	Type	Score	Event
Total	TSS	155.15	2017 CS Ondrej Nepela Trophy
Short program	TSS	54.03	2017 CS Ondrej Nepela Trophy
Short program	TES	29.03	2017 CS Ondrej Nepela Trophy
Short program	PCS	25.00	2017 CS Ondrej Nepela Trophy
Free skating	TSS	101.12	2017 CS Ondrej Nepela Trophy
Free skating	TES	49.52	2017 CS Ondrej Nepela Trophy
Free skating	PCS	53.60	2017 CS Ondrej Nepela Trophy
