= Sofja Stepčenko =

Latvian figure skater (born 2006)

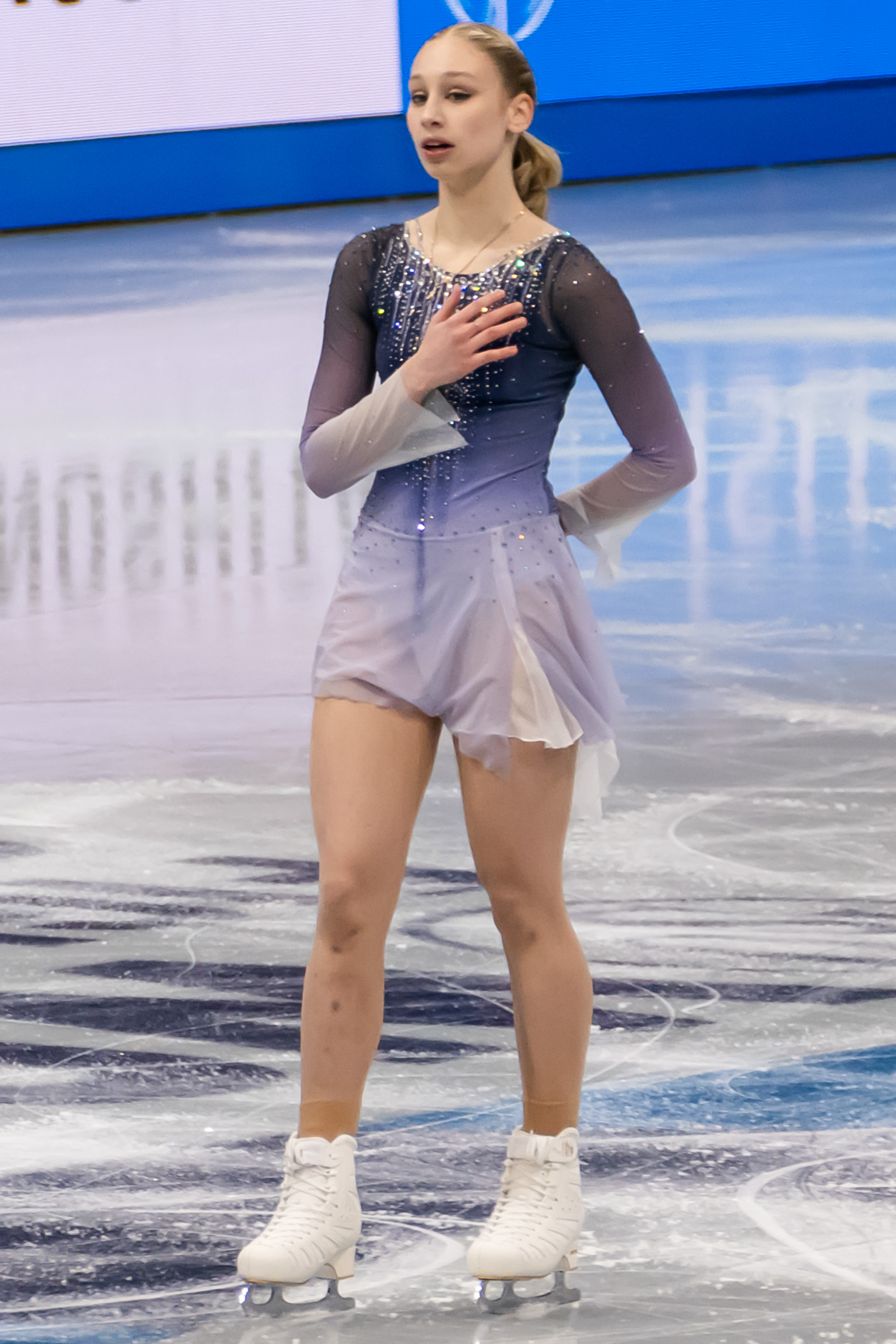
- Sofja Stepčenko at the 2025 World Championships

Personal information
- Born: 21 December 2006 (age 19) Riga, Latvia
- Height: 1.62 m (5 ft 4 in)

Figure skating career
- Country: Latvia
- Discipline: Women's singles
- Coach: Stéphane Lambiel; Angelo Dolfini; Giulia Isceri; Gerli Liinamäe
- Skating club: Kristal Ice
- Began skating: 2010

Medal record
Latvian Championships
Gold medal – first place	2023 Riga	Singles
Gold medal – first place	2024 Riga	Singles
Silver medal – second place	2025 Riga	Singles

Sofja Stepčenko (born 21 December 2006) is a Latvian figure skater. She is a two-time Latvian national champion (2022-23) and 2023 Volvo Open Cup champion. She placed eleventh at the 2023 European Championships.

== Career ==
=== Early years ===
Stepčenko began figure skating in 2010. She competed in the advanced novice category for two seasons and then moved up to the junior ranks in 2020.

=== 2021–22 season ===
Stepčenko made her ISU Junior Grand Prix (JGP) debut in September, finishing seventeenth at 2021 JGP Poland. She followed this up with a twenty-sixth place finish at 2021 JGP Austria. She competed at her assignments with pain in her hip, and she learned in December that she had developed a stress fracture with necrosis.

She subsequently won silver on the junior level at the 2021 Victor Petrenko Cup, at the 2021 Volvo Open Cup, and at the 2022 Kurbada Cup.

=== 2022–23 season ===
Stepčenko began her season on the Junior Grand Prix series, finishing twenty-first at the 2022 JGP France and twelfth at the 2022 JGP Latvia. In November, making her senior international debut, she placed fourth at the Volvo Open Cup and seventh at the Tallinn Trophy. Her first senior international medal, gold, came in December at the Latvia Trophy. The second-best Latvian woman at the event was Angelīna Kučvaļska, who finished in fifth place.

Stepčenko was nominated to represent Latvia at the 2023 European Championships, which took place in January in Helsinki, Finland. Ranked fourteenth in the short program, she qualified to the free skate and climbed to eleventh overall. This was the best European result by a Latvian woman since Angelina Kučvaļska's fourth place at the 2016 edition. Stepčenko came twenty-third at the 2023 World Championships. She competed at the event after badly spraining her ankle a week beforehand; she later said she was pressured by her coaches to compete despite her injury.

=== 2023–24 season ===
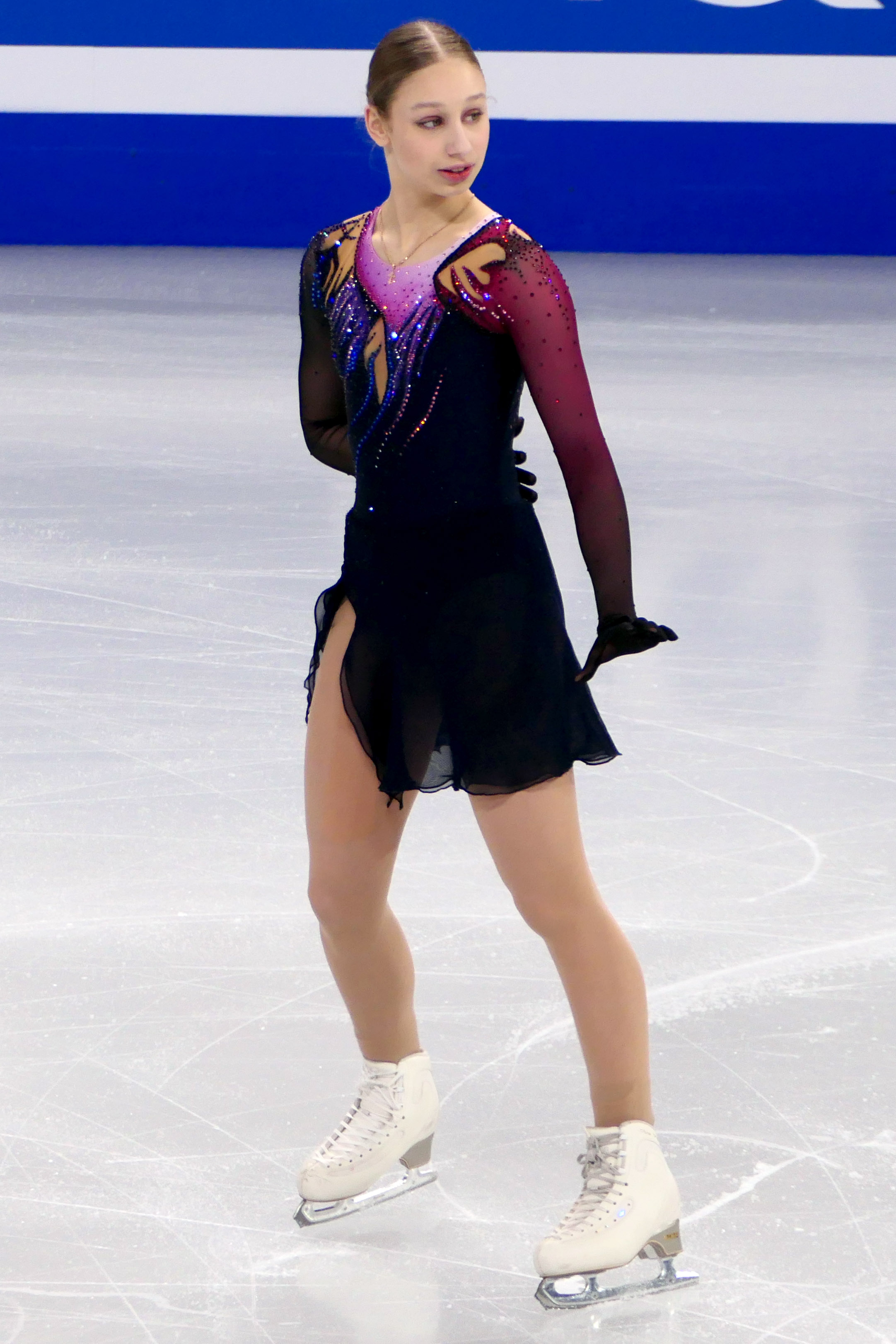
Stepčenko at the 2024 World Championships

Stepčenko started the season by competing on the Junior Grand Prix series, finishing sixth at the 2023 JGP Turkey. She went on to compete on the senior international level as well, winning the 2023 Jelgava Cup and placing twelfth at the 2023 CS Nepela Memorial.

Appearing again on the Junior Grand Prix, Stepčenko finished tenth at the 2023 JGP Armenia. Her next event was the 2023 CS Budapest Trophy, where she finished eleventh. Going on to compete at two events in Latvia, Stepčenko won silver at the 2023 Volvo Open Cup and gold at the 2023 Latvia Trophy.

Selected to compete at the 2024 European Championships in Kaunas, Lithuania, Stepčenko placed twenty-first in the short program and thirteenth in the free skate, finishing thirteenth overall. At this event, Stepčenko scored a new personal best free skate score. Soon after, Stepčenko competed on the junior level at the 2024 Volvo Open Cup, winning the gold medal.

Competing at the 2024 Youth Olympics, Stepčenko finished sixteenth. She then competed at the 2024 World Championships, where she placed thirty-first.

=== 2024–25 season ===
In July, it was announced that Stepčenko had left longtime coach, Olga Kovalkova and had relocated to Champéry, Switzerland to train under Stéphane Lambiel. Competing at the 2024 CS Nebelhorn Trophy, Stepčenko finished twelfth. Debuting on the 2024–25 Grand Prix circuit, Stepčenko finished twelfth at 2024 Skate America. She then went on to finish ninth at the 2024 CS Tallinn Trophy and at the 2024 Santa Claus Cup.

In December, Stepčenko won the silver medal at the 2025 Latvian Championships behind Anastasija Konga. She subsequently finished sixth at the 2025 Bavarian Open and won the bronze medal at the 2025 Skate Helena. Although she completed the short program at the 2025 Dragon Trophy, she withdrew before the event's free skate.

In February, Stepčenko sought psychological care and was diagnosed with depression and complex post-traumatic stress disorder. Lambiel advised her to withdraw from the upcoming World championships, but he left the final decision up to her, and she decided to compete.

In March, Stepčenko competed at the 2025 Daugava Open Cup, where she finished in fourth place. The following week, she competed at the 2025 World Championships in Boston, Massachusetts, United States. She placed thirtieth in the short program and did not advance to the free skate segment.

=== 2025–26 season: Hiatus ===
In July, Stepčenko announced that she would skip the 2025–26 season to focus on her mental health.

=== 2026–27 season ===
Stepčenko returned to competition at the 2026 Nebelhorn Trophy placing ninth overall.

== Scandals and controversies ==
In August, Stepčenko became one of several skaters to accuse the leaders of her former training base, Kristal Ice in Riga, of abuse, namely her longtime coaches, Olga Kovalkova and Raimo Reinsalu. She said that she had been through several stays in mental hospitals to deal with the effects of the training under them, which caused her to become suicidal, and their comments had exacerbated an eating disorder she had struggled with for years. She alleged that she had been pushed to train and compete on severe injuries, that she was told that she was lying when she said she was in pain, and that her injuries were blamed on her weight. The coaches denied encouraging her to compete while injured and accused of her being manipulative and lying to gain donations. In late September, it was reported that the Latvian Skating Association had not yet reimbursed her for her travel expenses for her Grand Prix series events in the 2024–25 season; these expenses are paid by the competition organizers to the national federations, which are supposed to then disburse the funds to the skaters.

== Programs ==
Season	Short program	Free skating	Exhibition
2026–2027	Bridges by Alika Milova choreo. by Giulia Isceri		
2025–2026	Did not compete this season		
2024–2025	Bridges by Alika Milova choreo. by Giulia Isceri	Le Bal des folles by Asaf Avidan choreo. by Stéphane Lambiel	
2023–2024	All Eyes On Me by Victor McKnight, SquigglyDigg choreo. by Ruslan Kuzlovich	Il est oú le bonheur by Christophe Maé choreo. by Ruslan Kuzlovich	We Are Number One (from LazyTown) by Máni Svavarsson & Stefán Karl Stefánsson
2022–2023	All Eyes On Me by Victor McKnight, SquigglyDigg choreo. by Ruslan Kuzlovich	Il est oú le bonheur by Christophe Maé choreo. by Ruslan Kuzlovich	
2021–2022	All Eyes On Me by Victor McKnight, SquigglyDigg choreo. by Ruslan Kuzlovich	Il est oú le bonheur by Christophe Maé choreo. by Ruslan Kuzlovich	

== Competitive highlights ==
- GP – Event of the ISU Grand Prix Series
- JGP – Event of the ISU Junior Grand Prix Series
- CS – Event of the ISU Challenger Series
- TBD – Assigned
- WD – Withdrew from competition

Competition placements at senior level
Season	2022–23	2023–24	2024–25	2026–27
World Championships	23rd	31st	30th	
European Championships	11th	13th		
Latvian Championships	1st	1st	2nd	
GP Skate America			12th	
CS Budapest Trophy		11th		30th
CS Nebelhorn Trophy			12th	9th
CS Nepela Memorial		12th		
CS Tallinn Trophy	7th		9th	
Bavarian Open			6th	
Daugava Open Cup			4th	
Dragon Trophy			WD	
Jelgava Cup		1st		
Latvia Trophy	1st	1st		
Santa Claus Cup			9th	
Skate Helena			3rd	
Volvo Open Cup (Note: 47th Volvo Cup Open)	4th			
Volvo Open Cup (Note: 48th Volvo Cup Open)	1st	2nd		
Wolmar Spring Cup	1st			

Competition placements at junior level
Season	2020–21	2021–22	2022–23	2023–24
Winter Youth Olympics				16th
JGP Armenia				10th
JGP Austria		26th		
JGP France			21st	
JGP Latvia			12th	
JGP Poland		17th		
JGP Turkey				6th
Kurbada Cup		2nd		
Petrenko Cup		2nd		
Volvo Open Cup	5th	2nd		1st

== Detailed results ==
ISU personal best scores in the +5/-5 GOE System
Segment	Type	Score	Event
Total	**TSS**	**159.34**	2023 European Championships
Short program	**TSS**	**58.87**	2023 World Championships
Short program	TES	34.84	2023 World Championships
Short program	PCS	25.67	2024 CS Nebelhorn Trophy
Free skating	**TSS**	**105.16**	2024 European Championships
Free skating	TES	56.06	2024 European Championships
Free skating	PCS	52.07	2024 CS Nebelhorn Trophy

Current personal best scores are highlighted in bold.

=== Senior results ===
2026–27 season
Date	Event	SP	FS	Total
September 24–26, 2026	2026 Nebelhorn Trophy	8 38.88	9 50.95	9 89.83

2024–25 season
Date	Event	SP	FS	Total
March 24–30, 2025	2025 World Championships	30; 45.93	–	30; 45.93
March 14–16, 2025	2025 Daugava Open Cup	3; 52.30	6; 80.11	4; 132.41
February 6–9, 2025	2025 Dragon Trophy	9; 43.30	WD	WD
January 31–February 2, 2025	2025 Skate Helena	3; 43.55	3; 82.22	3; 125.77
January 20–26, 2025	2025 Bavarian Open	10; 43.61	4; 103.11	6; 1346.72
December 6–7, 2024	2025 Latvian Championships	2; 50.93	2; 100.90	2; 151.83
November 27–December 2, 2024	2024 Santa Claus Cup	11; 45.88	6; 93.08	9; 138.96
November 12–17, 2024	2024 CS Tallinn Trophy	16; 42.34	8; 93.13	9; 135.47
October 18–20, 2024	2024 Skate America	11; 44.56	12; 93.36	12; 137.92
September 19–21, 2024	2024 CS Nebelhorn Trophy	11; 53.29	13; 91.98	12; 145.27
2023–24 season
Date	Event	SP	FS	Total
March 18–24, 2024	2024 World Championships	31; 46.74	–	31; 46.74
January 10–14, 2024	2024 European Championships	21; 52.53	13; **105.16**	13; 157.69
December 8–10, 2023	2023 Latvia Trophy	1; 60.01	1; 110.75	1; 170.76
November 2–5, 2023	2023 Volvo Open Cup	2; 53.60	1; 110.77	2; 164.37
October 13–15, 2023	2023 CS Budapest Trophy	7; 56.81	18; 91.38	11; 148.19
September 28–30, 2023	2023 CS Nepela Memorial	15; 47.48	11; 94.75	12; 142.23
September 16–17, 2023	2023 Jelgava Cup	1; 62.05	1; 109.85	1; 171.90
2022–23 season
Date	Event	SP	FS	Total
April 7–9, 2023	2023 Wolmar Spring Cup	1; 60.80	2; 99.07	1; 159.87
March 22–26, 2023	2023 World Championships	18; **58.87**	24; 99.51	23; 158.38
January 25–29, 2023	2023 European Championships	14; 55.32	11; 104.02	11; **159.34**
January 19–22, 2023	2023 Volvo Open Cup	3; 56.10	1; 118.56	1; 174.66
December 16–18, 2022	2022 Latvia Trophy	2; 58.64	1; 119.07	1; 177.71
November 24–27, 2022	2022 Tallinn Trophy	9; 47.80	4; 97.66	7; 145.46
November 3–4, 2022	2022 Volvo Open Cup	10; 48.65	2; 111.62	4; 160.27

=== Junior results ===
2023–24 season
Date	Event	SP	FS	Total
January 28–30, 2024	2024 Winter Youth Olympics	16; 44.77	16; 76.02	16; 120.79
January 10–14,2024	2024 Volvo Open Cup	1; 56.67	2; 103.31	1; 159.98
October 4–7, 2023	2023 JGP Armenia	13; 46.23	10; 93.78	10; 140.01
September 6–8, 2023	2023 JGP Turkey	15; 56.78	11; 100.63	12; 157.41
2022–23 season
Date	Event	SP	FS	Total
September 7–10, 2022	2022 JGP Latvia	18; 43.24	9; 96.75	12; 139.99
August 24–27, 2022	2022 JGP France	22; 34.11	20; 66.07	21; 100.18
2021–22 season
Date	Event	SP	FS	Total
April 8–10, 2022	2022 Kurbada Cup	3; 44.83	2; 90.73	2; 135.56
November 3–7, 2021	2021 Volvo Open Cup	2; 48.51	6; 78.36	2; 126.87
October 20–23, 2021	2021 Petrenko Cup	2; 48.55	2; 97.23	2; 145.78
October 6–9, 2021	2021 JGP Austria	16; 46.16	31; 60.48	26; 106.64
September 29–October 2, 2021	2021 JGP Poland	22; 35.38	14; 74.18	17; 109.56
2020–21 season
Date	Event	SP	FS	Total
November 7–8, 2020	2020 Volvo Open Cup	5; 41.20	5; 66.32	5; 107.52
