= Anete Lāce =

Latvian figure skater (born 2003)

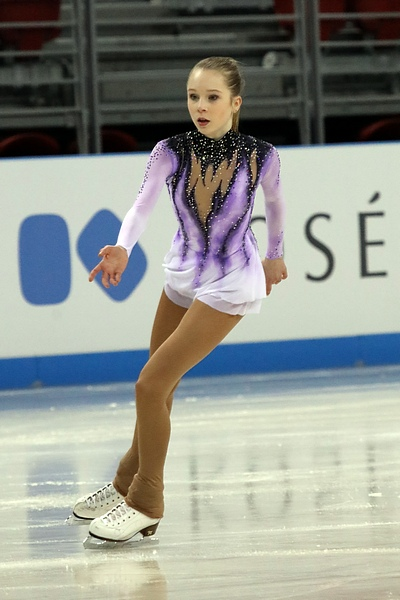
- Lāce at the 2018 World Junior Championships

Personal information
- Born: 13 July 2003 (age 22) Riga, Latvia
- Home town: Riga
- Height: 1.72 m (5 ft 7 1/2 in)

Figure skating career
- Country: Latvia
- Coach: Alexei Urmanov; Alma Lepina-Lāce
- Skating club: Slidošanas Studijas Alma
- Began skating: 2006

Anete Lāce (born 13 July 2003) is a Latvian figure skater. She is the 2020 Volvo Open Cup silver medalist, a three-time Latvian junior national champion (2018–20), and competed in the final segment at the 2020 World Junior Championships.

== Personal life ==
Lāce was born on 13 July 2003 in Riga. She is the daughter of 1992 Olympian Alma Lepina, the first figure skater to represent Latvia at the Olympics.

== Programs ==
Season	Short program	Free skating
2021–2022	Can't Help Falling in Love performed by Tommee Profitt choreo. by Oleg Purtov	Danse macabre by Camille Saint-Saëns choreo. by Oleg Purtov
2019–2021	Dollhouse by Melanie Martinez choreo. by Aija Gierkeva	Une Voix; I Wanna by Marija Naumova choreo. by Aija Gierkeva
2018–2019	Dollhouse by Melanie Martinez; Dead Silence by Charlie Clouser choreo. by Aija Gierkeva	Crazy in Love by Beyoncé performed by Sofia Karlberg; Crazy in Love by Beyoncé performed by Swing Republic choreo. by Aija Gierkeva
2017–2018	Clair de Lune by Claude Debussy choreo. by Jūlija Tepliha	Crazy in Love by Beyoncé performed by Sofia Karlberg; Crazy in Love by Beyoncé performed by Swing Republic choreo. by Aija Gierkeva

== Competitive highlights ==
CS: Challenger Series; JGP: Junior Grand Prix

International
Event	17–18	18–19	19–20	20–21	21–22	22–23
Worlds					33rd	
Europeans					24th	
CS Autumn Classic					WD	
CS Golden Spin					WD	
CS Ice Star			16th			
CS Lombardia Trophy					23rd	
CS Nebelhorn Trophy					17th	
CS Warsaw Cup				C		WD
Challenge Cup				14th		
NRW Trophy				8th		
Tallink Hotels Cup				15th		
Toruń Cup			10th			
Victor Petrenko Cup					1st	
Volvo Open Cup				2nd		
International: Junior
Junior Worlds	37th		21st			
JGP Czech Rep.		23rd				
JGP France			22nd			
JGP Latvia	19th		16th			
EYOF		11th				
Cup of Tyrol		5th				
Kaunas Cup	4th					
Tallinn Trophy		12th				
Volvo Open Cup	3rd	12th				
National
Latvian Champ.	1st J	1st J	1st J			
