= 2014 CS Volvo Open Cup =

- Type: ISU Challenger Series
- Date: November 5–9
- Season: 2014–15
- Location: Riga, Latvia
- Venue: Volvo Ice Rink

The 2014 CS Volvo Open Cup was a senior international figure skating competition held in November 2014 at the Volvo Ice Rink in Riga, Latvia. It was part of the 2014–15 ISU Challenger Series. Medals were awarded in the disciplines of men's singles, ladies' singles, pair skating, and ice dance.

== Results ==
=== Medal summary ===
Discipline	Gold	Silver	Bronze
Men	(Russia) Alexander Petrov	(Russia) Gordei Gorshkov	(Russia) Artur Dmitriev Jr.
Ladies	(Latvia) Angelīna Kučvaļska	(Germany) Lutricia Bock	(Finland) Jenni Saarinen
Pairs	(Russia) Kristina Astakhova / Alexei Rogonov	(Russia) Maria Vigalova / Egor Zakroev	(Belarus) Maria Paliakova / Nikita Bochkov
Ice dancing	(Slovakia) Federica Testa / Lukáš Csölley	(Belarus) Viktoria Kavaliova / Yurii Bieliaiev	(South Korea) Rebeka Kim / Kirill Minov

=== Men ===
Rank	Name	Nation	Total	SP		FS	
1	Alexander Petrov	Russia	218.78	1	74.49	1	144.29
2	Gordei Gorshkov	Russia	205.08	2	72.17	2	132.91
3	Artur Dmitriev Jr.	Russia	189.28	6	58.67	3	130.61
4	Daniel Samohin	Israel	183.47	3	61.91	4	121.56
5	Andrei Lazukin	Russia	174.41	4	61.66	5	112.75
6	Sergei Borodulin	Russia	160.57	7	55.73	6	104.84
7	Harry Mattick	Great Britain	153.55	9	51.72	8	101.83
8	Graham Newberry	Great Britain	153.45	5	59.87	11	93.58
9	Franz Streubel	Germany	152.97	8	55.69	10	97.28
10	Florian Lejeune	France	152.12	10	50.83	9	101.29
11	Gaylord Lavoisier	France	151.23	15	47.24	7	103.99
12	Jack Newberry	Great Britain	139.88	11	50.46	13	89.42
13	Lewis Gibson	Great Britain	139.10	12	49.92	14	89.18
14	Charlie Parry-Evans	Great Britain	133.25	14	48.98	15	84.27
15	Nicolas Dubois	Switzerland	132.69	18	42.79	12	89.90
16	Mark Webster	Australia	112.74	17	42.93	17	69.81
17	Marco Klepoch	Slovakia	108.94	19	41.30	18	67.64
18	Alexander Betke	Germany	107.65	16	46.06	19	61.59
19	Conor Stakelum	Ireland	105.46	20	29.62	16	75.84
WD	Paul Fentz	Germany	withdrew	13	48.99	withdrew from competition	

=== Ladies ===
Rank	Name	Nation	Total	SP		FS	
1	Angelīna Kučvaļska	Latvia	146.08	5	47.12	1	98.96
2	Lutricia Bock	Germany	143.21	2	49.07	2	94.14
3	Jenni Saarinen	Finland	141.30	1	50.05	4	91.25
4	Camilla Gjersem	Norway	139.35	4	47.43	3	91.92
5	Aleksandra Golovkina	Lithuania	130.77	3	48.36	8	82.41
6	Anastasia Galustyan	Armenia	129.48	7	45.42	6	84.06
7	Karly Robertson	Great Britain	126.89	11	42.56	5	84.33
8	Isadora Williams	Brazil	124.03	6	45.44	9	78.59
9	Gerli Liinamäe	Estonia	117.94	14	41.69	10	76.25
10	Helery Hälvin	Estonia	115.88	21	33.11	7	82.77
11	Sara Casella	Italy	114.82	12	42.36	11	72.46
12	Pernille Sørensen	Denmark	114.69	9	43.12	13	71.57
13	Kristine Gaile	Latvia	113.47	10	42.88	15	70.59
14	Guia Maria Tagliapietra	Italy	111.31	16	40.63	14	70.68
15	Ieva Gaile	Latvia	111.04	17	39.35	12	71.69
16	Anine Rabe	Norway	109.76	13	41.88	17	67.88
17	Netta Schreiber	Israel	104.15	19	35.73	16	68.42
18	Alexandra Kunova	Slovakia	98.39	15	40.79	21	57.60
19	Aimee Buchanan	Israel	97.21	18	37.61	18	59.60
20	Olivia Tuuva	Finland	93.29	20	35.20	20	58.09
21	Christina Grill	Austria	85.12	24	26.43	19	58.69
22	Emilia Toikkanen	Finland	82.77	22	30.47	23	52.30
23	Sindra Kriisa	Estonia	76.57	23	28.42	24	48.15
24	Victoria Huebler	Austria	76.53	25	24.13	22	52.40
WD	Janina Makeenka	Belarus	withdrew	8	45.23	withdrew from competition	
WD	Kim Tae-kyung	South Korea	withdrew from competition				
WD	Anna Ovcharova	Switzerland	withdrew from competition				

=== Pairs ===
Rank	Name	Nation	Total	SP		FS	
1	Kristina Astakhova / Alexei Rogonov	Russia	170.34	1	60.28	1	110.06
2	Maria Vigalova / Egor Zakroev	Russia	162.68	2	53.18	2	109.50
3	Maria Paliakova / Nikita Bochkov	Belarus	126.70	3	43.28	3	83.42
4	Alessandra Cernuschi / Filippo Ambrosini	Italy	112.00	4	38.84	4	72.83

=== Ice dancing ===
Rank	Name	Nation	Total	SD		FD	
1	Federica Testa / Lukáš Csölley	Slovakia	140.84	1	59.64	1	81.20
2	Viktoria Kavaliova / Yurii Bieliaiev	Belarus	135.10	2	55.32	2	79.78
3	Rebeka Kim / Kirill Minov	South Korea	132.86	4	53.28	3	79.58
4	Laurence Fournier Beaudry / Nikolaj Sørensen	Denmark	129.36	3	53.58	4	75.78
5	Olga Jakushina / Andrey Nevskiy	Latvia	120.86	5	48.90	6	71.96
6	Allison Reed / Vasili Rogov	Israel	120.18	7	44.66	5	75.52
7	Federica Bernardi / Saverio Giacomelli	Italy	114.28	6	45.38	8	68.90
8	Ludmila Sosnitskaia / Pavel Golovishnikov	Russia	114.26	8	43.64	7	70.62
9	Elizaveta Tretiakov / Vadim Vilegzanin	Uzbekistan	101.30	9	40.10	9	61.20
