= Maria Balaba =

Latvian figure skater

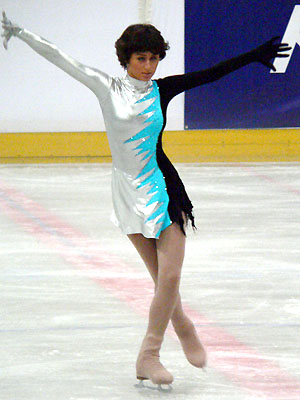
- Balaba in 2006.

Personal information
- Born: 1 May 1988 (age 38)
- Height: 1.68 m (5 ft 6 in)

Figure skating career
- Country: Latvia
- Coach: Galina Efremenko
- Skating club: FSC Riga

Maria Balaba (born 1 May 1988) is a Latvian figure skater. She is the 2004–2005 Latvian national champion. Balaba was born in Riga, and is coached by Galina Efremenko.

== Competitive highlights ==
Event	2000–2001	2001–2002	2002–2003	2003–2004	2004–2005	2005–2006	2006–2007
World Junior Championships				42nd	18th QR	22nd QR	
Latvian Championships	3rd	3rd	2nd	1st	1st	2nd	2nd
Nebelhorn Trophy							11th
Junior Grand Prix, The Hague							28th
Junior Grand Prix, Poland						31st	
Junior Grand Prix, Ukraine					25th		
Junior Grand Prix, Ostrava				23rd			
European Youth Olympic Days			19th J.				

- J = Junior level; QR = Qualifying Round
