= Artur Dmitriev Jr. =

Russian-American figure skater

Artur Dmitriev
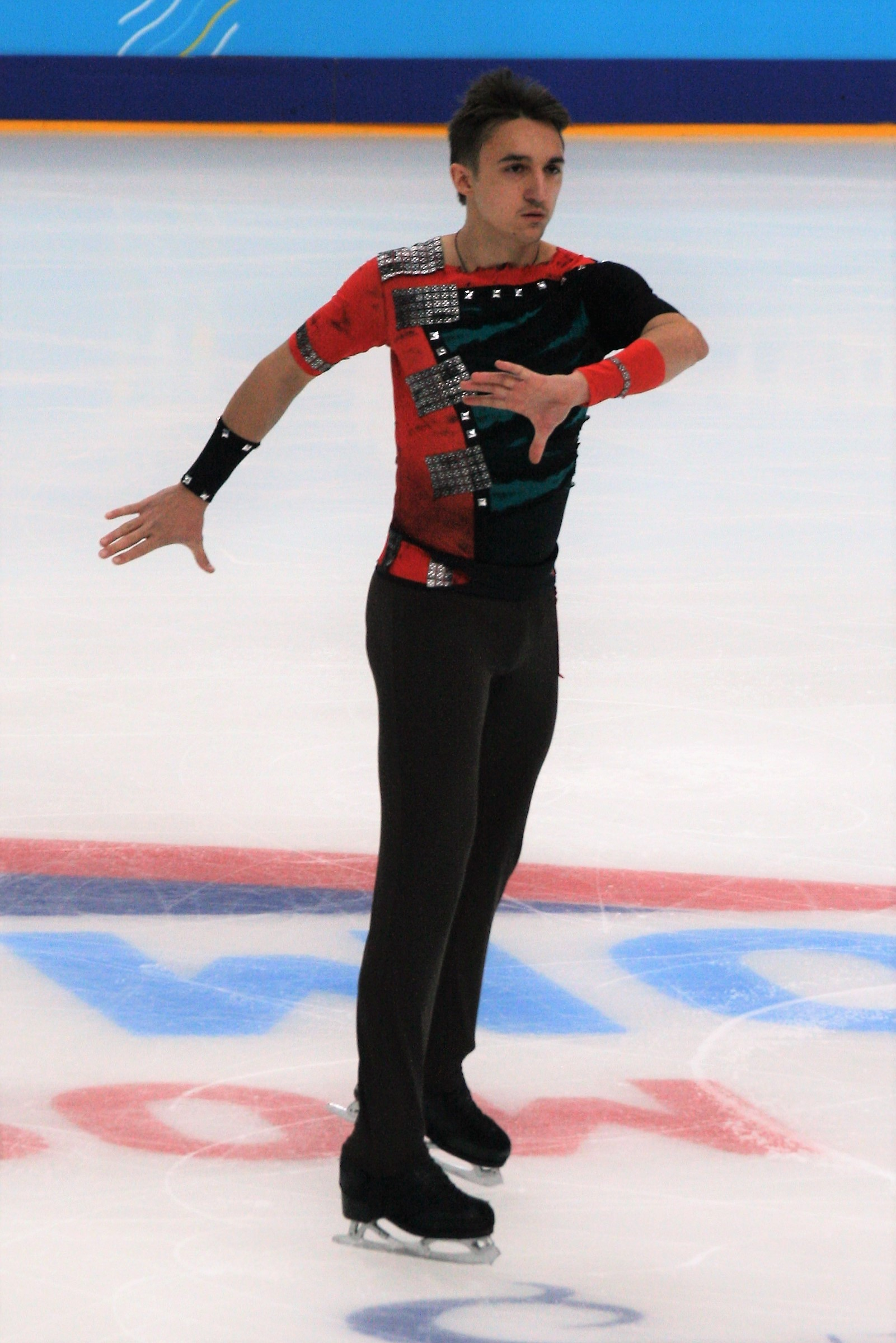
- Dmitriev at the 2016 Rostelecom Cup

Personal information
- Native name: Артур Артурович Дмитриев
- Full name: Artur Arturovich Dmitriev
- Born: 7 September 1992 (age 34) Saint Petersburg, Russia
- Height: 1.75 m (5 ft 9 in)

Figure skating career
- Country: United States
- Coach: Ekaterina Dmitrieva (Ukolova)
- Skating club: Yubileyny
- Began skating: 1999

Artur Arturovich Dmitriev (Russian: Артур Артурович Дмитриев; born 7 September 1992) is a Russian figure skater, who currently competes for the United States. He is the 2015 CS Ice Challenge champion, 2014 Cup of Nice silver medalist, and competed at three World Junior Championships, twice finishing in the top ten. He was the first skater ever to attempt a quadruple axel in international competition.

As of October 2021, he competes for the U.S.

== Personal life ==
Artur Dmitriev Jr. was born in Saint Petersburg, Russia, the son of Tatiana Druchinina, a World champion in rhythmic gymnastics, and Artur Dmitriev, a two-time Olympic champion in pair skating. At around age seven, he moved with his family to the United States and lived there for seven years. His parents divorced in 2006. Dmitriev Jr. has a half-brother, Artiom, from his father's second marriage. He speaks Russian and English.

Dmitriev Jr. married former figure skater Ekaterina Dmitrieva (Ukolova) in August 2020.

== Career ==
Dmitriev began skating seriously at about the age of seven or eight in Hackensack, New Jersey. At age 11, he received 280 stitches after his face was cut by another skater's blade in Hackensack. Around 2007, he began working with Alexei Mishin at the Yubileyny Sports Palace in Saint Petersburg.

At the 2010 World Junior Championships, Dmitriev was the only skater to land a quad toe loop in the long program, which he did in combination with a double toe. He rose from 15th after the short program to finish 7th overall. He continued to work on his quads and practiced a quad salchow and loop in May 2010 but was hampered by back problems during the 2010-11 season.

In late 2010, Dmitriev moved to Moscow to train with Elena Vodorezova (Buianova). In the 2012–13 season, he switched to Nikolai Morozov but missed most of the season after breaking two bones, in his knee and foot.

In March 2014, Dmitriev moved back to Saint Petersburg and rejoined Mishin. In the 2014–15 season, he won the silver medal at the International Cup of Nice and bronze at his first ISU Challenger Series (CS) event, the Volvo Open Cup. At the 2015 Russian Championships he withdrew after the short program.

In the 2015–16 season, he won a CS competition, the Ice Challenge, with a total score 6.92 points greater than the silver medalist, Jason Brown. A week later he won the 2015 Volvo Open Cup. On December 24–27, he finished 10th at the 2016 Russian Championships.

In November 2016 Dmitriev made his Grand Prix debut at the 2016 Rostelecom Cup where he placed 10th. A week later he skated his 2nd GP event at the 2016 Trophée de France where he placed 9th. In December 2016 he placed 8th at the 2017 Russian Championships. In February 2017 he competed at the 2017 Winter Universiade where he finished 4th.

In the 2017–18 season, he won the bronze medal at the 2017 CS Golden Spin of Zagreb and finished 5th at the 2018 Russian Championships.

In the 2018–19 season, he started his season at the 2018 CS Nebelhorn Trophy where he won the bronze medal. At the 2018 Rostelecom Cup, he placed eleventh overall after falling on his quadruple axel attempt in the free program.

In 2021, Dmitriev announced his intention to compete for the United States. He competed in the US Championship Series, the qualifying series for the 2022 U.S. Figure Skating Championships. He competed at the event in Leesburg, Virginia. He was fourth after the short, second in the free and third overall among four skaters. He is also scheduled to compete at the event in Alpharetta, Georgia.

== Skating technique ==
Dmitriev was the first man to land a 3Lz+3F cleanly in competition at the 2018 CS Nebelhorn Trophy. At the 2018 Rostelecom Cup, Dmitriev attempted a quadruple axel; this made him the first skater ever to attempt a quadruple axel in international competition.

== Programs ==
Season	Short program	Free skating
2018–19	Gladiator by Hans Zimmer	Crusadors of the Light; La Coronacion; Manuela by Globus
2017–18	Maybe I Maybe You by Scorpions	Crusadors of the Light; La Coronacion; Manuela by Globus
2016–17	Adagio in G minor by Remo Giazotto, Tomaso Albinoni	Polovtsian Dances by Alexander Borodin
2013–14	Sarabande by George Frideric Handel arranged by Alex Goldstein	D'Artagnan by Maxime Rodriguez
2011–12	Beetlejuice by Danny Elfman	Piano Fantasy by William Joseph
2010–11	Nostradamus by Maksim Mrvica choreo. by Tatiana Druchinina	Gypsy Dance by unknown choreo. by Tatiana Druchinina
2009–10	Nostradamus by Maksim Mrvica choreo. by Tatiana Druchinina	Pirates of the Caribbean by Klaus Badelt, Hans Zimmer choreo. by Tatiana Druchinina

== Competitive highlights ==
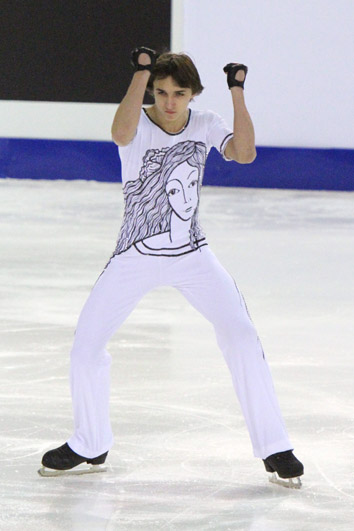
DMITRIEV at the 2010 World Junior Championships

GP: Grand Prix; CS: Challenger Series; JGP: Junior Grand Prix

=== For the U.S. ===
National
Event	21–22
U.S. Nationals	11th

=== For Russia ===
International
Event	09–10	10–11	11–12	12–13	13–14	14–15	15–16	16–17	17–18	18–19
GP France								9th		
GP NHK Trophy										
GP Rostelecom								10th		11th
CS Golden Spin								9th	3rd	
CS Ice Challenge							1st			
CS Nebelhorn								6th		3rd
CS Volvo Cup						3rd				
Universiade								4th		
Cup of Nice			7th			2nd				
Nebelhorn					4th					
Sarajevo Open							1st			
Volvo Open Cup							1st			
International: Junior
Junior Worlds	7th	8th	14th							
JGP Czech Rep.		2nd								
JGP Germany		4th								
JGP Italy			4th							
JGP Poland			2nd							
Cup of Nice	2nd									
National
Russia	14th	7th	5th	9th	9th	WD	10th	8th	5th	9th
Russia, Junior	2nd	1st	2nd							
TBD = Assigned; WD = Withdrew

== Detailed results ==
Small medals for short and free programs awarded only at ISU Championships.

2018–19 season
Date	Event	SP	FS	Total
19–23 December 2018	2019 Russian Championships	6; 79.75	10; 136.06	9; 215.81
16–18 November 2018	2018 Rostelecom Cup	9; 67.58	11; 122.00	11; 189.58
26–29 September 2018	2018 CS Nebelhorn Trophy	2; 81.06	3; 144.25	3; 225.31
2017–18 season
Date	Event	SP	FS	Total
21–24 December 2017	2018 Russian Championships	7; 83.66	5; 154.85	5; 238.51
6–9 December 2017	2017 CS Golden Spin of Zagreb	5; 77.35	4; 152.39	3; 229.74
2016–17 season
Date	Event	SP	FS	Total
1–5 February 2017	2017 Winter Universiade	3; 87.18	7; 150.64	4; 237.82
20–26 December 2016	2017 Russian Championships	5; 80.97	10; 145.80	8; 226.77
7–10 December 2016	2016 CS Golden Spin of Zagreb	9; 71.71	9; 142.90	9; 214.61
11–13 November 2016	2016 Trophée de France	11; 64.48	7; 154.22	9; 218.70
4–6 November 2016	2016 Rostelecom Cup	7; 76.06	9; 145.46	10; 221.52
22–24 September 2016	2016 CS Nebelhorn Trophy	6; 71.36	6; 137.83	6; 209.19
2015–16 season
Date	Event	SP	FS	Total
4–6 February 2016	2016 Sarajevo Open	1; 70.75	1; 146.55	1; 217.30
23–27 December 2015	2016 Russian Championships	12; 72.67	9; 150.60	10; 223.27
4–8 November 2015	2015 Volvo Open Cup	1; 86.18	1; 165.26	1; 251.44
27–31 October 2015	2015 CS Ice Challenge	2; 84.46	2; 163.11	1; 247.57
2014–15 season
Date	Event	SP	FS	Total
24–28 December 2014	2015 Russian Championships	15; 60.82		WD
5–9 November 2014	2014 CS Volvo Open Cup	6; 58.67	3; 130.61	3; 189.28
15–19 October 2014	2014 Cup of Nice	2; 74.20	3; 126.94	2; 201.14
2013–14 season
Date	Event	SP	FS	Total
24–27 December 2013	2014 Russian Championships	8; 71.32	11; 130.71	9; 202.03
26–28 September 2013	2013 Nebelhorn Trophy	4; 73.39	7; 128.35	4; 201.74
