= Volvo Open Cup =

Annual figure skating competition

The Volvo Open Cup is an annual international figure skating competition held in Riga, Latvia. In some years, the event is part of the ISU Challenger Series. Medals may be awarded in men's singles, women's singles, pair skating, and ice dance.

== Senior results ==
CS: Challenger Series event

=== Men's singles ===
Men's event medalists
| Edition | Date | Gold | Silver | Bronze | Ref. |
|---|---|---|---|---|---|
| 20th | January 2013 | (Kazakhstan) Denis Ten | (Russia) Mikhail Kolyada | (Hong Kong) Ronald Lam | |
| 21st | May 2013 | (Russia) Evgeny Pozhidaev | No other competitors | | |
| 22nd | November 2013 | (Russia) Evgeni Plushenko | (Russia) Alexander Petrov | (Russia) Sergei Borodulin | |
| 25th CS | November 2014 | (Russia) Alexander Petrov | (Russia) Gordei Gorshkov | (Russia) Artur Dmitriev Jr. | |
| 28th | November 2015 | (Russia) Artur Dmitriev Jr. | (Sweden) Alexander Majorov | (Germany) Martin Rappe | |
| 31st | November 2016 | (Russia) Alexander Samarin | (Russia) Igor Efimchuk | (Russia) Artem Lezheev | |
| 34th | November 2017 | (Italy) Ivan Righini | (Italy) Maurizio Zandron | (United Kingdom) Phillip Harris | |
| 37th | November 2018 | (Azerbaijan) Vladimir Litvintsev | (Israel) Mark Gorodnitsky | (Ukraine) Ivan Shmuratko | |
| 40th | November 2019 | (Russia) Artem Kovalev | (Georgia (country)) Irakli Maysuradze | (Azerbaijan) Vladimir Litvintsev | |
| 44th | November 2021 | (Georgia (country)) Irakli Maysuradze | (Estonia) Aleksandr Selevko | (Georgia (country)) Nika Egadze | |
| 47th | November 2022 | (Poland) Vladimir Samoilov | (Estonia) Arlet Levandi | (Ukraine) Kyrylo Marsak | |
| 48th | January 2023 | (Estonia) Arlet Levandi | (Estonia) Jegor Martsenko | (Germany) Louis Weissert | |
| 49th | May 2023 | No men's competitors | | | |
| 50th | November 2023 | (Poland) Vladimir Samoilov | (Spain) Tomàs-Llorenç Guarino Sabaté | (Hungary) Aleksandr Vlasenko | |
| 51st | January 2024 | (Estonia) Arlet Levandi | (Israel) Lev Vinokur | (Finland) Arttu Juusola | |
| 52nd | May 2024 | No men's competitors | | | |
| 53rd | November 2024 | (Ukraine) Kyrylo Marsak | (France) Samy Hammi | (France) Landry Le May | |
| 54th | January 2025 | (Latvia) Fedirs Kuļišs | (Poland) Vladimir Samoilov | (Croatia) Jari Kessler | |
| 55th | May 2025 | | | | |
| 56th | November 2025 | (Estonia) Arlet Levandi | (Ukraine) Kyrylo Marsak | (Latvia) Fedirs Kuļišs | |
| 57th | January 2026 | (Estonia) Arlet Levandi | (Latvia) Fedirs Kuļišs | (Finland) Valtter Virtanen | |

=== Women's singles ===
Women's event medalists
| Edition | Date | Gold | Silver | Bronze | Ref. |
|---|---|---|---|---|---|
| 20th | January 2013 | (China) Li Zijun | (China) Zhao Ziquan | (Slovenia) Daša Grm | |
| 21st | May 2013 | | | | |
| 22nd | November 2013 | (Australia) Brooklee Han | (United Kingdom) Jenna McCorkell | (Finland) Juulia Turkkila | |
| 25th CS | November 2014 | (Latvia) Angelīna Kučvaļska | (Germany) Lutricia Bock | (Finland) Jenni Saarinen | |
| 28th | November 2015 | (Sweden) Matilda Algotsson | (Austria) Kerstin Frank | (South Korea) Byun Ji-hyun | |
| 31st | November 2016 | (Latvia) Angelīna Kučvaļska | (Hungary) Ivett Tóth | (Australia) Kailani Craine | |
| 34th | November 2017 | (Estonia) Gerli Liinamäe | (Brazil) Isadora Williams | (United Kingdom) Danielle Harrison | |
| 37th | November 2018 | (Hungary) Ivett Tóth | (United Kingdom) Karly Robertson | (United Kingdom) Kristen Spours | |
| 40th | November 2019 | (Belarus) Viktoria Safonova | (Azerbaijan) Ekaterina Ryabova | (Georgia (country)) Alina Urushadze | |
| 43rd | November 2020 | (Latvia) Angelīna Kučvaļska | (Latvia) Anete Lāce | No other competitors | |
| 44th | November 2021 | (Georgia (country)) Alina Urushadze | (Switzerland) Livia Kaiser | (Finland) Oona Ounasvuori | |
| 47th | November 2022 | (Finland) Janna Jyrkinen | (Estonia) Kristina Škuleta-Gromova | (Finland) Emmi Peltonen | |
| 48th | January 2023 | (Latvia) Sofja Stepčenko | (Estonia) Nataly Langerbaur | (Finland) Olivia Lisko | |
| 49th | May 2023 | No women's competitors | | | |
| 50th | November 2023 | (Sweden) Josefin Taljegård | (Latvia) Sofja Stepcenko | (United Kingdom) Kristen Spours | |
| 51st | January 2024 | (Latvia) Anastasija Konga | (Estonia) Kristina Lisovskaja | (Finland) Oona Ounasvuori | |
| 52nd | May 2024 | (Sweden) Alice Nyman | (Estonia) Martaliis Kuslap | No other competitors | |
| 53rd | November 2024 | (Sweden) Josefin Taljegård | (Finland) Olivia Lisko | (Belgium) Jade Hovine | |
| 54th | January 2025 | (Finland) Olivia Lisko | (Lithuania) Meda Variakojytė | (Norway) Mia Risa Gomez | |
| 55th | May 2025 | | | | |
| 56th | November 2025 | (Finland) Iida Karhunen | (Sweden) Josefin Taljegård | (Lithuania) Meda Variakojytė | |
| 57th | January 2026 | (Estonia) Nataly Langerbaur | (Lithuania) Meda Variakojytė | (Israel) Elizabet Gervits | |

=== Pairs ===
Pairs event medalists
| Edition | Date | Gold | Silver | Bronze | Ref. |
|---|---|---|---|---|---|
| 25th CS | November 2014 | (Russia) Kristina Astakhova / Alexei Rogonov | (Russia) Maria Vigalova / Egor Zakroev | (Belarus) Maria Paliakova / Nikita Bochkov | |
| 31st | November 2016 | (Israel) Arina Cherniavskaia / Evgeni Krasnopolski | (Australia) Paris Stephens / Matthew Dodds | No other competitors | |
| 34th | November 2017 | (United Kingdom) Zoe Jones / Christopher Boyadji | (Azerbaijan) Sofiya Karagodina / Semen Stepanov | (Switzerland) Ioulia Chtchetinina / Mikhail Akulov | |
| 37th | November 2018 | (France) Cléo Hamon / Denys Strekalin | (France) Camille Mendoza / Pavel Kovalev | (France) Coline Keriven / Antoine Noel Pierre | |
| 40th | November 2019 | (Italy) Rebecca Ghilardi / Filippo Ambrosini | (Russia) Karina Akopova / Maksim Shagalov | (Israel) Anna Vernikov / Evgeni Krasnapolski | |
| 48th | January 2023 | No pairs competitors | | | |
| 51st | January 2024 | No pairs competitors | | | |
| 52nd | May 2024 | No pairs competitors | | | |
| 54th | January 2025 | No pairs competitors | | | |
| 55th | May 2025 | No pairs competitors | | | |
| 56th | November 2025 | No pairs competitors | | | |
| 57th | January 2026 | No pairs competitors | | | |

=== Ice dance ===
Ice dance event medalists
| Edition | Date | Gold | Silver | Bronze | Ref. |
|---|---|---|---|---|---|
| 20th | January 2013 | (Russia); Victoria Sinitsina; Ruslan Zhiganshin | (Estonia); Irina Štork; Taavi Rand | (Germany); Tanja Kolbe; Stefano Caruso | |
| 21st | May 2013 | No ice dance competitors | | | |
| 22nd | November 2013 | (Azerbaijan); Julia Zlobina; Alexei Sitnikov | (Germany); Nelli Zhiganshina; Alexander Gazsi | (Italy); Lorenza Alessandrini; Simone Vaturi | |
| 25th CS | November 2014 | (Slovakia) Federica Testa / Lukáš Csölley | (Belarus) Viktoria Kavaliova / Yurii Bieliaiev | (South Korea) Rebeka Kim / Kirill Minov | |
| 28th | November 2015 | (South Korea) Rebeka Kim / Kirill Minov | (Latvia) Olga Jakušina / Andrey Nevskiy | (Norway) Thea Rabe / Timothy Koleto | |
| 31st | November 2016 | (Slovakia) Lucie Myslivečková / Lukáš Csölley | (Germany) Kavita Lorenz / Joti Polizoakis | (Azerbaijan) Varvara Ogloblina / Mikhail Zhirnov | |
| 34th | November 2017 | (Germany) Katharina Müller / Tim Dieck | (Ukraine) Darya Popova / Volodymyr Byelikov | (Hungary) Anna Yanovskaya / Ádám Lukács | |
| 37th | November 2018 | (Russia) Betina Popova / Sergey Mozgov | (Germany) Katharina Müller / Tim Dieck | (Ukraine) Darya Popova / Volodymyr Byelikov | |
| 40th | November 2019 | (Russia) Sofia Shevchenko / Igor Eremenko | (Georgia (country)) Maria Kazakova / Georgy Reviya | (Finland) Yuka Orihara / Juho Pirinen | |
| 44th | November 2021 | (Russia) Elizaveta Khudaiberdieva / Egor Bazin | (Hungary) Mariia Ignateva / Danijil Szemko | (Azerbaijan) Ekaterina Kuznetsova / Oleksandr Kolosovskyi | |
No ice dance competitors since the 44th Volvo Open Cup

== Junior results ==
=== Men's singles ===
Junior men's event medalists
| Edition | Date | Gold | Silver | Bronze | Ref. |
|---|---|---|---|---|---|
| 20th | January 2013 | (Russia) Alexander Petrov | (Russia) Vladislav Smirnov | (Finland) Viktor Zubik | |
| 21st | May 2013 | (Lithuania) Laurynas Vonžodas | (Russia) Iliya Chernih | No other competitors | |
| 22nd | November 2013 | (Latvia) Deniss Vasiļjevs | (United Kingdom) Graham Newberry | (Russia) Igor Efimchuk | |
| 25th | November 2014 | (Russia) Dmitri Aliev | (Israel) Artem Tsoglin | (France) Daniel Albert Naurits | |
| 28th | November 2015 | (Russia) Petr Gumennik | (United Kingdom) Josh Brown | (Estonia) Jegor Zelenjak | |
| 31st | November 2016 | (Russia) Andrei Mozalev | (Estonia) Daniel Albert Naurits | (Germany) Denis Gurdzhi | |
| 34th | November 2017 | (Russia) Vladislav Chashkov | (Russia) Alexander Bibikov | (France) Xavier Vauclin | |
| 37th | November 2018 | (Kazakhstan) Rakhat Bralin | (Switzerland) Noah Bodenstein | (Germany) Florian Paschke | |
| 40th | November 2019 | (Russia) Aleksander Golubev | (Russia) Matvei Gilev | (Belarus) Yakau Zenko | |
| 43rd | November 2020 | (Estonia) Jegor Martchenko | (Latvia) Daniel Kockers | (Latvia) Antons Trofimovs | |
| 44th | November 2021 | (Estonia) Jegor Martchenko | (Israel) Iakov Pogrebinskii | (France) Axel Ahmed | |
| 47th | November 2022 | (Ukraine) Glib Smotrov | (Israel) Nikita Sheiko | (Israel) Iakov Pogrebinskii | |
| 48th | January 2023 | (United Kingdom) Edward Appleby | (Ukraine) Glib Smotrov | (Germany) Luca Fünfer | |
| 49th | May 2023 | (Latvia) Fedirs Kuļišs | (Latvia) Ratmirs Bekisbajevs | No other competitors | |
| 50th | November 2023 | (Latvia) Fedirs Kuļišs | (Israel) Nikita Sheiko | (Italy) Matteo Nalbone | |
| 51st | January 2024 | (Ukraine) Kyrylo Marsak | (Chinese Taipei) Li Yu-Hsiang | (Ukraine) Kyrylo Lishenko | |
| 52nd | May 2024 | (Latvia) Nikolajs Krivoseja | (Sweden) Liam Gao | No other competitors | |
| 53rd | November 2024 | (Belgium) Denis Krouglov | (Poland) Oscar Oliver | (United Kingdom) Lucas Fitterer | |
| 54th | January 2025 | (Sweden) Casper Johansson | (Estonia) Vladislav Churakov | (Latvia) Nikolajs Krivosheja | |
| 55th | May 2025 | | | | |
| 56th | November 2025 | (Belgium) Denis Krouglov | (Lithuania) Luka Imedashvili | (Estonia) Vladislav Churakov | |
| 57th | January 2026 | (Israel) Nikita Sheiko | (Kazakhstan) Artur Smagulov | (Lithuania) Luka Imedashvili | |

=== Women's singles ===
Junior women's event medalists
| Edition | Date | Gold | Silver | Bronze | Ref. |
|---|---|---|---|---|---|
| 20th | January 2013 | (Russia) Maria Stavitskaia | (Ukraine) Anna Khnychenkova | (Latvia) Angelīna Kučvaļska | |
| 21st | May 2013 | (Latvia) Samanta Kovalkova | (Latvia) Elizabete Pujate | (Russia) Alina Anisimova | |
| 22nd | November 2013 | (Russia) Serafima Sakhanovich | (Russia) Maria Gorokhova | (Lithuania) Deimantė Kizalaitė | |
| 23rd | January 2014 | (Latvia) Samanta Kovalkova | (Latvia) Karlina Monika Pole | (Lithuania) Ugnė Pečiukaitytė | |
| 25th | November 2014 | (Latvia) Diāna Ņikitina | (Germany) Lea Johanna Dastich | (South Korea) Son Suh-hyun | |
| 27th | May 2015 | (Estonia) Sindra Kriisa | (Estonia) Kart Jodsche | (Estonia) Ethel Enniko | |
| 28th | November 2015 | (Latvia) Diāna Ņikitina | (Germany) Annika Hocke | (Ukraine) Kim Cheremsky | |
| 31st | November 2016 | Group I: (Russia) Anastasiia Gubanova | Group I: (Australia) Holly Harris | Group I: (Russia) Augusta-Anastasia Evseeva | |
| 31st | November 2016 | Group II: (Switzerland) Polina Ustinkova | Group II: (Estonia) Annely Vahi | Group II: (Germany) Jennifer Schmidt | |
| 34th | November 2017 | (Russia) Anastasia Guliakova | (Estonia) Nastasya Eremina | (Latvia) Anete Lace | |
| 37th | November 2018 | (Austria) Olga Mikutina | (Switzerland) Emelie Ling | (Estonia) Niina Petrokina | |
| 40th | November 2019 | (Russia) Kseniia Sinitsyna | (Ukraine) Anastasiia Shabotova | (Latvia) Mariia Bolsheva | |
| 43rd | November 2020 | (Finland) Janna Jyrkinen | (Latvia) Mariia Bolsheva | (Estonia) Marianne Must | |
| 44th | November 2021 | (Finland) Iida Karhunen | (Latvia) Sofja Stepchenko | (Estonia) Marianne Must | |
| 47th | November 2022 | (Finland) Iida Karhunen | (Finland) Petra Lahti | (Estonia) Maria Eliise Kaljuvere | |
| 48th | January 2023 | (Denmark) Anna-Flora Colmor Jepsen | (Israel) Anna Sheniuk | (Finland) Petra Lahti | |
| 49th | May 2023 | (Estonia) Helina Kull | (Latvia) Paula Nelsone | (Estonia) Elizabeta Victorija Ravinskaja | |
| 50th | November 2023 | (Finland) Iida Karhunen | (Latvia) Kira Baranovska | (Estonia) Nataly Langerbaur | |
| 51st | January 2024 | (Latvia) Sofja Stepčenko | (Estonia) Nataly Langerbaur | (Lithuania) Meda Variakojytė | |
| 52nd | May 2024 | (Latvia) Kira Baranovska | (Latvia) Jelizaveta Derechina | (Estonia) Lara Isabel Koppel | |
| 53rd | November 2024 | (Estonia) Elina Goidina | (Finland) Iida Karhunen | (Latvia) Kira Baranovska | |
| 54th | January 2025 | (Finland) Iida Karhunen | (Latvia) Kira Baranovska | (Armenia) Sofya Titova | |
| 55th | May 2025 | | | | |
| 56th | November 2025 | (Latvia) Kira Baranovska | (Lithuania) Milana Siniaskytė | (Finland) Venla Sinisalo | |
| 57th | January 2026 | (Estonia) Elina Goidina | (Israel) Sophia Shifrin | (Israel) Simona Tkachman | |

=== Pairs ===
Junior pairs' event medalists
| Edition | Date | Gold | Silver | Bronze | Ref. |
|---|---|---|---|---|---|
| 25th | November 2014 | (Italy) Irma Caldara / Edoardo Caputo | No other competitors | | |
| 28th | November 2015 | (United States) Meiryla Findley / Austin Hale | (United States) Jacquelin Green / Rique Newby-Estrella | No other competitors | |
| 31st | November 2016 | (Russia) Nika Osipova / Aleksandr Galiamov | (Russia) Kseniia Akhanteva / Valerii Kolesov | (Israel) Hailey Kops / Artem Tsoglin | |
| 34th | November 2017 | (Italy) Irma Caldara / Edoardo Caputo | No other competitors | | |
| 37th | November 2018 | (Israel) Hailey Kops / Artem Tsoglin | (Belarus) Darya Rabkova / Vladyslav Gresko | (Ukraine) Sofiia Holichenko / Ivan Pavlov | |
| 40th | November 2019 | (Russia) Apollinariia Panfilova / Dmitry Rylov | (Russia) Diana Mukhametzianova / Ilia Mironov | (Georgia (country)) Alina Butaeva / Luka Berulava | |
| 48th | January 2023 | No junior pairs competitors | | | |
| 51st | January 2024 | No junior pairs competitors | | | |
| 54th | January 2025 | No junior pairs competitors | | | |
| 56th | November 2025 | No junior pairs competitors | | | |
| 57th | January 2026 | No junior pairs competitors | | | |

=== Ice dance ===
Junior ice dance event medalists
| Edition | Date | Gold | Silver | Bronze | Ref. |
|---|---|---|---|---|---|
| 20th | January 2013 | (Russia); Anna Yanovskaya; Sergey Mozgov | (Belarus); Viktoria Kavaliova; Yurii Bieliaiev | (Italy); Valentina Gabusi; Nik Mirzakani | |
| 21st | May 2013 | No junior ice dance competitors | | | |
| 22nd | November 2013 | (Russia); Anna Yanovskaya; Sergey Mozgov | (Ukraine); Oleksandra Nazarova; Maksym Nikitin | (Russia); Ekaterina Bocharova; Anton Shibnev | |
| 25th | November 2014 | (Russia) Anastasia Shpilevaya / Grigory Smirnov | (Poland) Natalia Kaliszek / Maksym Spodyriev | (Russia) Yulia Dolgikh / Dmitry Mikhailov | |
| 28th | November 2015 | (Russia) Polina Ivanenko / Daniil Karpov | (Belarus) Emilia Kalehanava / Uladzislau Palkhouski | (Russia) Arina Vakulenko / Egor Tarasenko | |
| 31st | November 2016 | (Russia) Sofia Litvinova / Alexandre Balikov | (Belarus) Emilia Kalehanava / Uladzislau Palkhouski | (France) Julia Wagret / Mathieu Couyras | |
| 34th | November 2017 | (Russia) Sofia Shevchenko / Igor Eremenko | (Russia) Sofya Litvinova / Aleksandr Balykov | (Russia) Aleksandra Kravchenko / Gordey Khubulov | |
| 37th | November 2018 | (Georgia (country)) Maria Kazakova / Georgy Reviya | (Russia) Elizaveta Shanaeva / Devid Naryzhnyy | (Russia) Diana Davis / Gleb Smolkin | |
| 40th | November 2019 | (Russia) Diana Davis / Gleb Smolkin | (Russia) Ekaterina Katashinskaia / Aleksandr Vaskovich | (Russia) Sofia Leontieva / Daniil Gorelkin | |
| 44th | November 2021 | (Russia) Polina Kocherigina / Evgeny Artuschenko | (Italy) Giorgia Galimberti / Matteo Libasso Mandelli | (Switzerland) Kayleigh Maksymec / Maximilien Rahier | |
No junior ice dance competitors since the 44th Volvo Open Cup
