= Stasija Rage =

Latvian figure skater (born 1991)

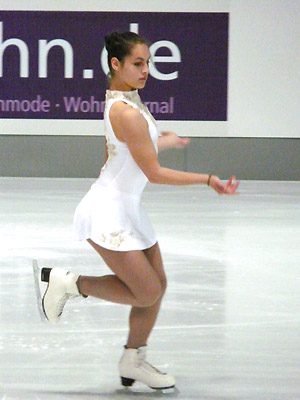
- Rage in 2007.

Personal information
- Other names: Stasia Rage
- Born: 9 May 1991 (age 35) Riga, Latvia
- Height: 1.62 m (5 ft 4 in)

Figure skating career
- Country: Latvia
- Coach: Marika Nugumanova
- Skating club: FSC MDK
- Began skating: 1995

Stasija Rage (born 9 May 1991) is a Latvian former competitive figure skater. She was born in Riga, and was the 2008 Latvian national champion. She started skating at age four.

== Programs ==
Season	Short program	Free skating
2009–10	Argentina Caso	Music by Pyotr Ilyich Tchaikovsky
2007–08	Séance Rondo	Music by Pyotr Ilyich Tchaikovsky

== Competitive highlights ==
JGP: Junior Grand Prix

International
Event	03–04	04–05	05–06	06–07	07–08	08–09	09–10	10–11
Worlds					48th			
Europeans					35th			
Nebelhorn					23rd			
International: Junior
Junior Worlds				46th				
JGP Bulgaria					23rd			
JGP France				16th		32nd		
JGP Norway				25th				
JGP Slovakia			26th					
JGP U.K.					19th			
EYOF				16th				
National
Latvian Champ.	5th	5th	3rd	3rd	1st			2nd
