= Fedirs Kuļišs =

Ukrainian-Latvian figure skater (born 2005)

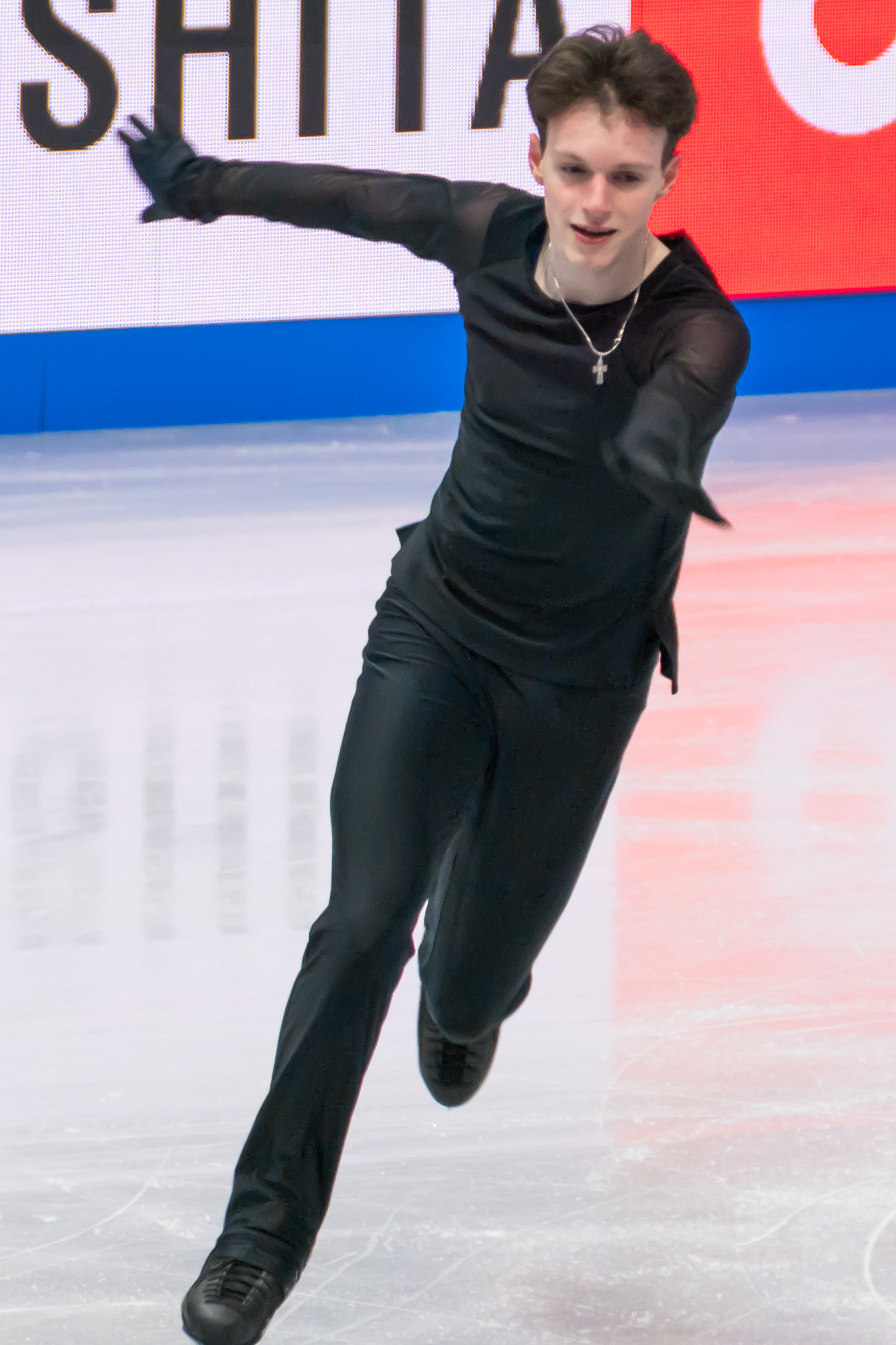
- Fedirs Kuļišs at the 2025 World Championships

Personal information
- Native name: Федір Куліш
- Other names: Fedir Kulish; Fedor
- Born: 26 March 2005 (age 21) Kyiv, Ukraine
- Home town: Riga, Latvia
- Height: 1.73 m (5 ft 8 in)

Figure skating career
- Country: Latvia (since 2023); Ukraine (2016–22)
- Discipline: Men's singles
- Coach: Olga Kovalkova
- Skating club: Kristal Ice
- Began skating: 2010

Medal record
Representing Latvia
Latvian Championships
Silver medal – second place	2024 Riga	Singles
Silver medal – second place	2025 Riga	Singles
Gold medal – first place	2026 Riga	Singles
Representing Ukraine
Ukrainian Championships
Bronze medal – third place	2021 Kyiv	Singles

Fedirs Kuļišs (Ukrainian: Федір Куліш, romanized: Fedir Kulish; born 26 March 2005) is a Ukrainian-Latvian figure skater. He is the 2026 Latvian national champion, 2025 Volvo Open Cup champion, and two-time Daugava Open Cup champion (2025–26). On the junior level, he is the 2023 JGP Armenia bronze medalist.

Additionally, while competing for Ukraine, he won the 2021 Ukrainian national bronze medal.

Kuļišs represented Latvia at the 2026 Winter Olympics.

== Personal life ==
Kuļišs was born on 26 March 2005, in Kyiv, Ukraine. Both his parents died from COVID-19 during the height of the pandemic.

In March 2022, he fled Ukraine following the country's Russian invasion and settled in Riga, Latvia. Kuļišs, who was sixteen at the time, was legally adopted by his figure skating coach, Olga Kovalkova. In December 2025, he became a citizen of Latvia and subsequently adopted the Latvianized spelling of his name.

== Career ==
=== Early years ===
Kuļišs' parents signed him up for figure skating when he was five years old as a way to improve his weak immune system. His first figure skating coach was Dmitri Shkidchenko.

Kuļišs made his junior national debut at the 2019 Ukrainian Junior Championships, finishing in eleventh place.

=== 2019–20 season: Junior international debut ===
Making his junior international debut at the 2019 Ice Star, Kuļišs finished the event in eighth place.

He subsequently finished eighth on the senior level at the 2020 Ukrainian Championships and eighth on the junior level.

=== 2020–21 season ===
Due to the COVID-19 pandemic, the 2020–21 ISU Junior Grand Prix series was cancelled. As a result, Kuļišs only competed in domestic events.

In February, he won the silver medal on the junior level at the 2021 Ukrainian Championships and bronze on the senior level.

=== 2021–22 season: Senior international debut ===
Coached by Alexander Artyshchenko, Kuļišs made his ISU Junior Grand Prix debut at 2021 JGP Slovenia, finishing in eighth place. He then went on to debut on the senior international level at the 2021 Autumn Talents Cup, placing fifth.

In December, he finished sixth at the 2022 Ukrainian Championships and a couple weeks later, placed seventh at the 2022 Ukrainian Junior Championships.

On 24 February 2022, Russia launched a massive invasion of Ukraine. As a result, Kuļišs fled to Latvia the following month. Learning of Kuļišs' situation, Riga-based figure skating coach, Olga Kovalkova, invited him to train under her at the Kristal Ice Skating Club and ultimately finance his skating career.

Deciding to switch countries and compete for Latvia, Kuļišs was required to sit out of competitions for a year and a half pending his release from the Ukrainian Figure Skating Federation.

=== 2023–24 season: Debut for Latvia ===
Making his return to competition, Kuļišs competed on the 2023–24 ISU Junior Grand Prix, finishing fifth at the 2023 JGP Turkey and winning the bronze medal at 2023 JGP Armenia. Between the two events, he competed on the senior level, winning the silver medal at the 2023 Jelgava Cup and finishing fifteenth at the 2023 CS Nepela Memorial.

Following a fourteenth-place finish at the 2023 CS Budapest Trophy, Kuļišs went on to win the gold medal on the junior level at the 2023 Volvo Open Cup and bronze on the senior level 2023 Latvia Trophy.

Selected to compete at the 2024 European Championships in Kaunas, Lithuania, Kuļišs placed twenty-ninth in the short program and did not advance to the free skate segment of the competition. He followed this up by finishing fourth on the junior level at the 2024 Volvo Open Cup.

Kuļišs finished the season by competing at the 2024 World Junior Championships in Taipei, Taiwan. He placed twenty-fifth in the short program and did not advance to the free skate segment of the competition.

=== 2024–25 season: World Championships debut ===
Kuļišs started the season by finishing fourth at the 2024 Volvo Open Cup and fifth at the 2024 Denkova-Staviski Cup. In December, at the 2025 Latvian Championships, Kuļišs won the silver medal behind Deniss Vasiļjevs.

Following a gold medal win at the 2025 Volvo Open Cup, Kuļišs went on to compete at the 2025 European Championships in Tallinn, Estonia. He placed fifteenth in the short program and fourteenth in the free skate, finishing fourteenth overall.

Kuļišs subsequently placed seventh at the 2025 Sonja Henie Trophy and won the gold medal at the 2025 Daugava Open.

Due to Deniss Vasiļjevs's top ten finish at the 2024 World Championships, Latvia was granted two berths for men's singles skating at the 2025 edition in Boston, Massachusetts, United States. Kuļišs was thus named to the World team. This marked the first time in history two Latvian men's singles skaters competing at a World Championships. At the event, Kuļišs placed twenty-third in the short program and twenty-fourth in the free skate, finishing twenty-fourth overall. His placement, in addition to Vasiļjevs's eleventh-place finish won Latvia two quotas for men's singles skating at the 2026 Winter Olympics.

=== 2025–26 season: Milano Cortina Olympics and first national title ===
Kuļišs began his season by winning gold at the 2025 Jelgava Cup and bronze at the 2025 Volvo Open Cup (Fall). In December, he won his first national title at the 2025 Latvian Championships.

In January, Kuļišs competed at the 2026 European Championships in Sheffield, England, United Kingdom, where he placed fifteenth overall. The following week, he won the silver medal at the 2026 Volvo Open Cup (Spring) and gold at the 2026 Silver Skate Winter Cup the week after.

On 10 February, Kuļišs competed in the short program segment at the 2026 Winter Olympics, placing twenty-eighth. He did not advance to the free skate segment.

In March, Kuļišs competed at the 2026 World Championships. He placed thirty-sixth in the short program and did not advance to the free skate.

== Programs ==
Season	Short program	Free skating
2025–2026	It's Wonderful by Roberto Danova & Angelo Camassa choreo. by Olga Kovalkova	Quando l'amore diventa poesia; L'immensità by Il Volo choreo. by Olga Kovalkova
2024–2025	It's Wonderful by Roberto Danova & Angelo Camassa choreo. by Olga Kovalkova	Quando l'amore diventa poesia; L'immensità by Il Volo choreo. by Olga Kovalkova
2023–2024	Exogenesis: Symphony (Part 2) by Muse choreo. by Olga Kovalkova	Quando l'amore diventa poesia; L'immensità by Il Volo choreo. by Olga Kovalkova
2021–2022	Hasta Que Te Conocí by Juan Gabriel & Raúl Di Blasio choreo. by Maria Podoprikhina	Вечная призрачная встречная; Ля-ля тополя by Bi-2 choreo. by Maria Podoprikhina

== Competitive highlights ==
- JGP – Event of the ISU Junior Grand Prix Series
- CS – Event of the ISU Challenger Series
- TBD – Assigned

=== For Latvia ===
Competition placements at senior level
Season	2023–24	2024–25	2025–26	2026–27
Winter Olympics			28th	
World Championships		24th	36th	
European Championships	29th	14th	15th	
Latvian Championships		2nd	1st	
CS Budapest Trophy	14th			
CS Lombardia Trophy				8th
CS Nepela Memorial	15th			
Daugava Open Cup		1st	1st	
Denkova-Staviski Cup		4th		
Jelgava Cup	2nd		1st	
Latvia Trophy	3rd			
Silver Skate Cup			1st	
Sonja Henie Trophy		7th		
Volvo Open Cup (Note: Volvo Open Cup Fall)		5th	3rd	3rd
Volvo Open Cup (Note: Volvo Open Cup Spring)		1st	2nd	

Competition placements at junior level
Season	2023–24
World Junior Championships	25th
JGP Armenia	3rd
JGP Turkey	5th
Volvo Open Cup (Note: 50th Volvo Cup Open)	1st
Volvo Open Cup (Note: 51st Volvo Cup Open)	4th

=== For Ukraine ===
Competition placements at senior level
Season	2019–20	2020–21	2021–22
Ukrainian Championships	8th	3rd	6th
Autumn Talents Cup			5th

Competition placements at junior level
Season	2018–19	2019–20	2020–21	2021–22
Ukrainian Championships	11th	8th	2nd	7th
JGP Slovenia				9th
Ice Star		8th		

== Detailed results ==
ISU personal best scores in the +5/-5 GOE System
Segment	Type	Score	Event
Total	TSS	214.33	2025 European Championships
Short program	TSS	74.84	2026 CS Lombardia Trophy
Short program	TES	44.62	2026 CS Lombardia Trophy
Short program	PCS	33.23	2025 World Championships
Free skating	TSS	140.00	2023 JGP Armenia
Free skating	TES	73.87	2023 JGP Armenia
Free skating	PCS	66.96	2025 European Championships

=== For Latvia ===
ISU personal best scores in the +5/-5 GOE System
Segment	Type	Score	Event
Total	TSS	214.33	2025 European Championships
Short program	TSS	74.48	2025 European Championships
Short program	TES	42.05	2025 European Championships
Short program	PCS	33.23	2025 World Championships
Free skating	TSS	140.00	2023 JGP Armenia
Free skating	TES	73.87	2023 JGP Armenia
Free skating	PCS	66.96	2025 European Championships

=== Senior results ===
Results in the 2025–26 season
Date	Event	SP		FS		Total	
Date	Event	P	Score	P	Score	P	Score
10–12 Oct 2025	(Latvia) 2025 Jelgava Cup	1	65.64	1	132.20	1	197.84
5–9 Nov 2025	(Latvia) 2025 Volvo Open Cup	3	73.79	3	120.95	3	194.74
6–7 Dec 2025	(Latvia) 2025 Latvian Championships	2	56.75	1	123.82	1	180.57
13–18 Jan 2026	(United Kingdom) 2026 European Championships	16	68.52	14	132.70	15	201.22
22–25 Jan 2026	(Latvia) 2026 Volvo Open Cup	2	67.58	2	139.28	2	206.86
29 Jan – 1 Feb 2026	(Latvia) 2026 Silver Skate Winter Cup	5	48.71	1	145.30	1	194.01
10–13 Feb 2026	(Italy) 2026 Winter Olympics	28	66.86	—N/a	—N/a	28	68.86
12–15 Mar 2026	(Latvia) 2026 Daugava Open Cup	4	56.80	2	124.23	2	181.03
24–29 Mar 2026	(Czech Republic) 2026 World Championships	36	56.85	—N/a	—N/a	36	56.85

Results in the 2026–27 season
Date	Event	SP		FS		Total	
Date	Event	P	Score	P	Score	P	Score
17–20 Sep 2026	(Italy) 2026 CS Lombardia Trophy	8	74.84	8	116.60	8	191.44
4–8 Nov 2026	(Latvia) 2026 Volvo Open Cup	3	72.03	3	137.65	3	209.68

2024–25 season
Date	Event	SP	FS	Total
24–30 March 2025	2025 World Championships	23; 73.25	24; 125.08	24; 198.33
14–16 March 2025	2025 Daugava Open Cup	2; 70.63	1; 143.20	1; 213.83
6–9 March 2025	2025 Sonja Henie Trophy	8; 64.23	7; 115.78	7; 180.01
28 January – 2 February 2025	2025 European Championships	15; 74.48	14; 139.85	15; 214.33
16–19 January 2025	2025 Volvo Open Cup	2; 75.15	1; 138.81	1; 213.96
6–7 December 2024	2025 Latvian Championships	2; 71.06	2; 148.96	2; 220.02
5–10 November 2024	2024 Denkova-Staviski Cup	4; 66.03	3; 142.88	4; 208.91
31 October – 3 November 2024	2024 Volvo Open Cup	5; 65.77	6; 120.16	5; 185.93
2023–24 season
Date	Event	SP	FS	Total
10–14 January 2024	2024 European Championships	29; 60.97	–	29; 60.97
8–10 December 2023	2023 Latvia Trophy	3; 63.41	3; 125.58	3; 188.99
13–15 October 2023	2023 CS Budapest Trophy	14; 58.23	16; 118.34	14; 176.57
28–30 September 2023	2023 CS Nepela Memorial	17; 54.98	15; 110.06	15; 165.04
16–17 September 2023	2023 Jelgava Cup	2; 57.64	2; 122.82	2; 180.46

=== Junior results ===
2023–24 season
Date	Event	SP	FS	Total
26 February – 3 March 2024	2024 World Junior Championships	25; 61.84	–	25; 61.84
18–21 January 2024	2024 Volvo Open Cup	6; 61.67	4; 118.30	4; 179.97
2–5 November 2023	2023 Volvo Open Cup	2; 63.62	1; 129.36	1; 192.98
4–7 October 2023	2023 JGP Armenia	3; 65.23	2; 140.00	3; 205.23
6–8 September 2023	2023 JGP Turkey	10; 60.02	5; 120.83	5; 180.85
