= Alma Lepina =

Latvian figure skater

Personal information
- Other names: Alma Lepina-Lāce
- Born: 8 June 1974 (age 52) Riga, Latvian SSR, Soviet Union
- Height: 1.64 m (5 ft 5 in)

Figure skating career
- Country: Latvia
- Retired: 1996

Alma Lepina-Lāce (born 8 June 1974) is a Latvian former competitive figure skater. She represented Latvia at the 1992 Winter Olympics in Albertville and finished 20th. Her best result at an ISU Championship was 13th at the 1993 Europeans in Helsinki, Finland. Lepina was coached by Oļegs Nagumanovs and Marika Nagumanova and represented the Daugava club.

== Competitive highlights ==
Event	88–89 (URS)	89–90 (URS)	90–91 (URS)	91–92 (LAT)	92–93 (LAT)	93–94 (LAT)	94–95 (LAT)	95–96 (LAT)
Winter lympics				20th				
World Championships				24th	37th	33rd		31st
European Championships				20th	13th	27th	18th	22nd
Latvian Championships				1st	1st	1st	1st	1st
Nations Cup			9th					
Skate Israel								6th
World Junior Championships	9th	10th						
