= Angelīna Kučvaļska =

Latvian figure skater (born 1998)

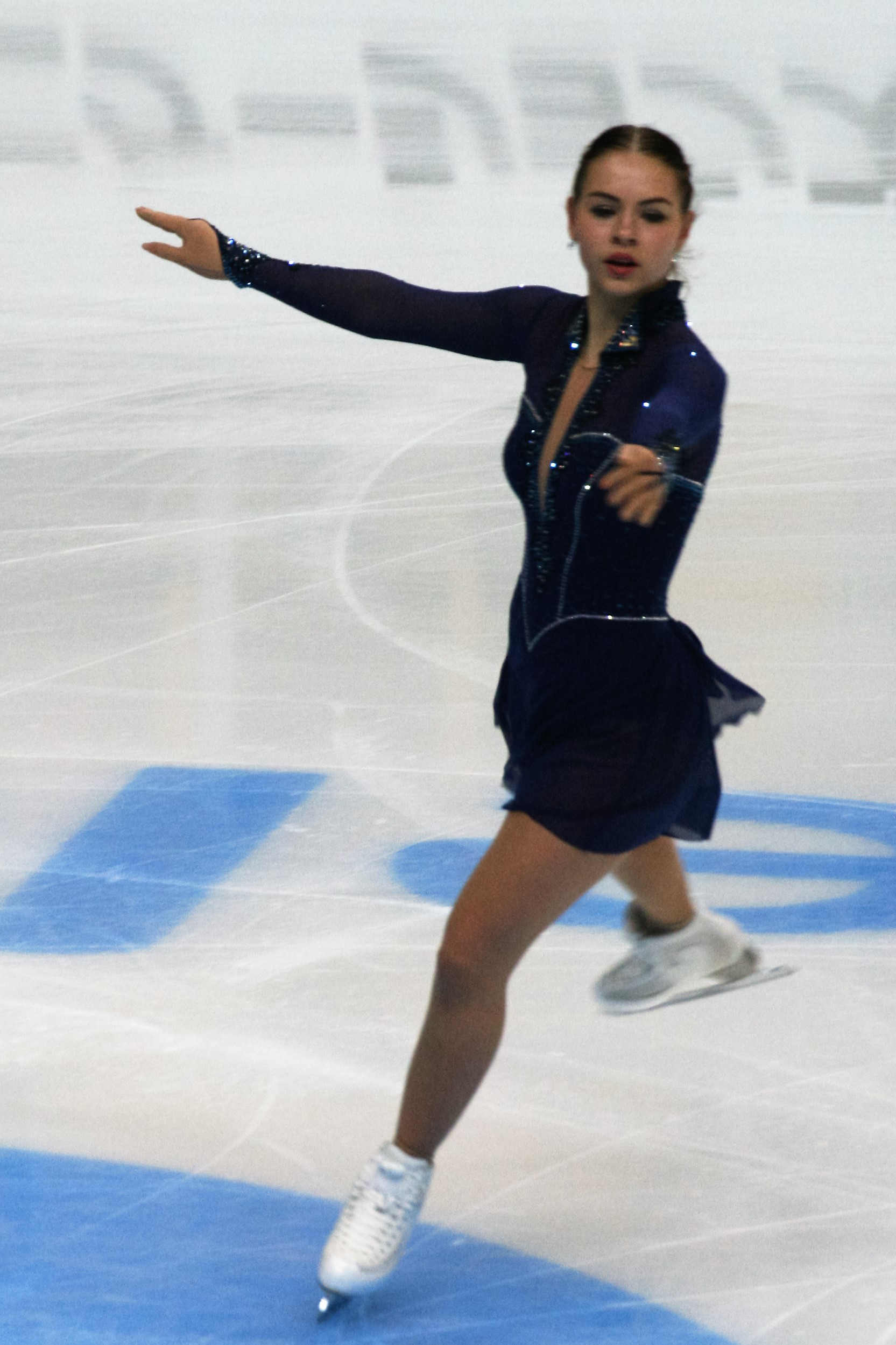
- Kučvaļska in 2016

Personal information
- Other names: Angelina Kuchvalska
- Born: 6 December 1998 (age 27) Saldus, Latvia
- Home town: Riga, Latvia
- Height: 1.64 m (5 ft 4 1/2 in)

Figure skating career
- Country: Latvia
- Coach: Jekaterina Platonova
- Skating club: Kaskads Riga
- Began skating: 2002

Angelīna Kučvaļska (born 6 December 1998) is a Latvian figure skater. She is the 2014 CS Volvo Open Cup champion, a two-time Toruń Cup champion (2015, 2016), the 2014 Tallinn Trophy champion, and a five-time Latvian national champion (2015–17, 2019–20). She has competed in the final segment at nine ISU Championships, achieving her best result, fourth, at the 2016 European Championships.

== Personal life ==
Angelīna Kučvaļska was born on December 6, 1998, in Saldus, Latvia. Her father died when she was 12 years old. She was a student at Riga 1st secondary school.

Kučvaļska is currently a student at RISEBA University of Business, Arts and Technology.

== Career ==
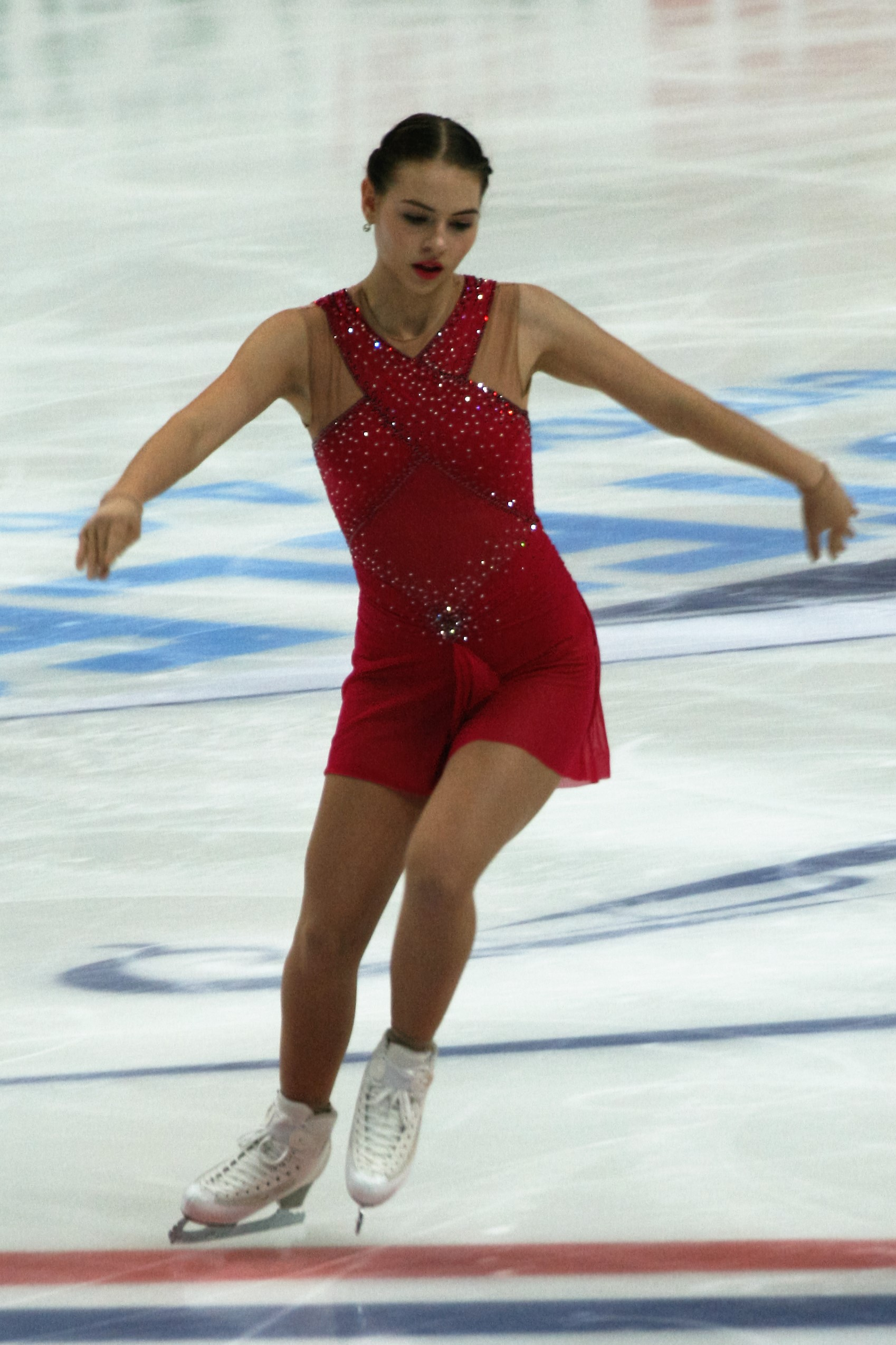
Kučvaļska at 2016 Rostelecom CupIMG 2074

=== Early career ===
Kučvaļska began skating at the age of three and a half years. Jekaterina Platonova is her first and only coach.

=== 2012–2013 season ===
Kučvaļska became age-eligible for junior internationals in the 2012–2013 season and placed sixteenth at her sole Junior Grand Prix (JGP) assignment in Courchevel, France. She was selected to represent Latvia at the 2013 World Junior Championships in Milan, Italy. Ranked twenty-second in the short program, she qualified to the free skate and finished 20th overall.

=== 2013–2014 season ===
Kučvaļska competed at two 2013 JGP events, placing fifteenth in Košice and nineteenth in Minsk, and won the junior silver medal at the Bavarian Open. She placed twentieth in both segments and nineteenth overall at the 2014 World Junior Championships in Sofia, Bulgaria.

=== 2014–2015 season ===
Kučvaļska placed seventh at both of her JGP assignments, in Ostrava and Tallinn. Making her senior international debut, she took gold at the 2014 Volvo Open Cup, an ISU Challenger Series (CS) event. Continuing on the senior level, she placed seventh at the CS Warsaw Cup and took gold at the Tallinn Trophy, Latvian Championships, and Toruń Cup. Kučvaļska was named in Latvia's team to the 2015 European Championships in Stockholm, Sweden, and placed seventeenth in the short program, earning qualification to the next segment. After placing fifth in the free skate, she climbed to seventh overall.

=== 2015–2016 season ===
Kučvaļska was unable to train in July 2015 due to an ankle injury. She began the 2015–16 season at a pair of CS events, placing 10th at the 2015 Ondrej Nepela Trophy before winning silver at the 2015 Denkova-Staviski Cup. Making her Grand Prix debut, she placed 7th in the short program at the 2015 Trophée Éric Bompard in Bordeaux, France; the event was cancelled due to the November 2015 Paris attacks.

At the 2015–16 Latvian Championships, Kučvaļska won her second consecutive national title.

Kučvaļska placed fifth in the short program, fourth in the free skate, and fourth overall at the 2016 European Championships in Bratislava, Slovakia. Her placement was the highest by a Latvian skater at the European Championships until Deniss Vasiljevs won the bronze medal in 2022.

Additionally, she went on to finish fifteenth at the 2016 World Championships in Boston, Massachusetts.

=== 2016–2017 season ===
Kučvaļska began the season by finishing twelfth at the 2016 CS Ondrej Nepela Memorial. She then competed at two Grand Prix events, placing eleventh at 2016 Skate America and tenth at the 2016 Rostelecom Cup. Kučvaļska would also go on to compete at the 2016 Volvo Open Cup and the 2016 CS Tallinn Trophy, taking gold and finishing seventh, respectively.

At the 2016–17 Latvian Championships, Kučvaļska won her third national title. She then went on to place fifth at the 2017 Mentor Toruń Cup.

Selected to compete at the 2017 European Championships in Ostrava, Czech Republic, Kučvaļska finished nineteenth before going on to win a silver medal at the 2017 Coupe du Printemps

Competing at the 2017 World Championships in Helsinki, Finland, Kučvaļska finished twenty-second.

=== 2017–2018 season ===
Beginning the season at the 2017 CS Ice Star, Kučvaļska finished sixteenth, before going on to compete at the 2017 CS Tallinn Trophy and placing thirtieth.

At the 2018 World Championships in Milan, Italy, Kučvaļska placed thirty-seventh in the short program and did not advance to the free skate segment of the competition.

=== 2018–2019 season ===
Kučvaļska started the season by competing at the 2018 Volvo Open Cup, placing twenty-first. She then went on to place nineteenth at both the 2018 CS Tallinn Trophy and 2018 CS Golden Spin of Zagreb.

At the 2018–19 Latvian Championships, Kučvaļska won her fourth national title. She went on to finish thirteenth at the 2019 Mentor Toruń Cup and seventh at the 2019 Tallink Hotels Cup.

Kučvaļska ended the season by finishing tenth at the 2019 Winter Universiade.

=== 2019–2020 season ===
Kučvaļska began the season at the 2019 CS Ondrej Nepela Memorial, finishing nineteenth, before going on to place fifth at the 2019 CS Ice Star, eleventh at the 2019 Volvo Open Cup, and fourth at the 2019 Tallinn Trophy.

She went on to win her fifth national title at the 2019–20 Latvian Championships, before finishing ninth

Competing at the 2020 European Championships in Graz, Austria, Kučvaļska placed thirtieth in the short program and did not advance to the free skate segment of the competition. She went on to finish ninth at the 2020 Tallink Hotels Cup and twentieth at the 2020 International Challenge Cup.

Although she was selected to compete at the 2020 World Championships, the event was ultimately cancelled due to rising concerns about the COVID-19 pandemic.

=== 2020–2021 season ===
Kučvaļska started the season by winning gold at the 2020 Volvo Open Cup, before placing sixteenth at the 2021 Tallink Hotels Cup.

Selected to compete at the 2021 World Championships in Stockholm, Sweden, Kučvaļska placed thirty-third in the short program and did not advance to the free skate segment of the competition.

=== 2021–2022 season ===
Kučvaļska began the season by winning gold at the 2021 Autumn Talents Cup. She then placed sixth at the 2021 Volvo Open Cup as well as won the silver medal at the 2021 Tallinn Trophy.

She went on to win bronze at both the 2022 Icelab International Cup and the 2022 Sofia Trophy. Kučvaļska ended the season with a seventh-place finish at the 2022 Tallink Hotels Cup.

=== 2022–2023 season ===
Beginning the season at the 2022 Volvo Open Cup, Kučvaļska finished eighth. She then went on to place fourteenth at the 2022 CS Warsaw Cup, win the silver medal at the 2022 Tallinn Trophy, and place fifth at the 2022 Latvia Trophy.

Selected to compete at the 2023 Winter World University Games, Kučvaļska finished tenth.

=== 2023–2024 season ===
Making two early appearances on the Challenger circuit, Kučvaļska was fourteenth at the 2023 CS Lombardia Trophy and seventeenth at the 2023 CS Finlandia Trophy.

== Programs ==
Season	Short program	Free skating	Exhibition
2023–2024	Silhouette by Gjon's Tears choreo. by Adam Solya	My Love; Bang Bang by Kovacs choreo. by Natalja Lipska	
2022–2023	BELLE by Gims, Dadju, & Slimane choreo. by Natalja Lipska	My Love; Bang Bang by Kovacs choreo. by Natalja Lipska	
2021–2022	BELLE by Gims, Dadju, & Slimane choreo. by Natalja Lipska	Alcoba Azul (from Frida) by Elliot Goldenthal; Street Passions by DiDuLa choreo. by Natalja Lipska	
2020–2021	Hurt by Christina Aguilera choreo. by Natalja Lipska	Alcoba Azul (from Frida) by Elliot Goldenthal; Street Passions by DiDuLa choreo. by Natalja Lipska	
2019–2020	Hurt by Christina Aguilera choreo. by Natalja Lipska	Alcoba Azul (from Frida) by Elliot Goldenthal; Street Passions by DiDuLa choreo. by Natalja Lipska	
2018–2019	Sway by Luis Demetrio performed by The Pussycat Dolls choreo. by Natalja Lipska	La cumparsita performed by Milva; Viejos Aires by Ensembla Nuevo Tango choreo. by Natalja Lipska	
2017–2018	Carmen Fantasie by Georges Bizet performed by David Garrett choreo. by Natalja Lipska	The Prayer performed by Celine Dion and Andrea Bocelli choreo. by Natalja Lipska	
2016–2017	If You Go Away by Shirley Bassey; Duendo by Bozzio Levin Stevens choreo. by Benoît Richaud, Natalja Lipska	O Fortuna (from Carmina Burana) by Carl Orff; Ameno Dorime by Enigma/Era; The Mass by Era choreo. by Benoît Richaud, Natalja Lipska	
2015–2016	E lucevan le stelle (from Tosca) by Giacomo Puccini choreo. by Natalja Lipska	El Tango de Roxanne (from Moulin Rouge!); Romeo and Juliet: Love Theme by Nino Rota; El Tango de Roxanne (from Moulin Rouge!) choreo. by Jekaterina Ostrovskaya	Bohemian Rhapsody performed by Pink
2014–2015	Carmen Suite by Georges Bizet choreo. by Jekaterina Ostrovskaya	El Tango de Roxanne (from Moulin Rouge!); Romeo and Juliet: Love Theme by Nino Rota; El Tango de Roxanne (from Moulin Rouge!) choreo. by Jekaterina Ostrovskaya	
2013–2014	Concert Fantasy on Carmen by Vanessa-Mae choreo. by Anda Rage	Music from Todes (ballet) choreo. by Anda Rage	
2012–2013	Music from Todes (ballet) choreo. by Anda Rage	Tango de los Exilados by Walter Taieb & Vanessa-Mae choreo. by Anda Rage	

== Competitive highlights ==
GP: Grand Prix; CS: Challenger Series; JGP: Junior Grand Prix

International
Event	12–13	13–14	14–15	15–16	16–17	17–18	18–19	19–20	20–21	21–22	22–23	23–24	25-26
Worlds			16th	15th	22nd	37th		C	33rd				
Europeans			7th	4th	19th			30th					
GP France				7th									
GP Rostelecom					10th								
GP Skate America					11th								
CS Denkova-Stav.				2nd									
CS Finlandia Trophy												17th	
CS Golden Spin							19th						
CS Ice Star						16th		5th					
CS Lombardia Trophy										WD		14th	
CS Ondrej Nepela				10th	12th			19th					
CS Tallinn Trophy				5th	7th	30th	19th						16th
CS Volvo Open			1st										
CS Warsaw Cup			7th					WD	C		14th	WD	
Amber Cup													3rd
Autumn Talents Cup										1st			
Challenge Cup								19th	WD				
Coupe Printemps					2nd								
Icelab International										3rd			
Jelgava Cup												6th	
Sofia Trophy										3rd			
Tallink Hotels Cup							7th	9th	16th	7th	WD		
Tallinn Trophy			1st					4th		2nd	2nd	10th	
Toruń Cup			1st	1st	5th		13th						
Volvo Open Cup				5th	1st		21st	11th	1st	6th	8th	7th	
Latvia Trophy											5th	3rd	
Universiade							10th				10th		
International: Junior
Junior Worlds	20th	19th		7th									
JGP Belarus		19th											
JGP Czech Rep.			7th										
JGP Estonia			7th										
JGP France	16th												
JGP Slovakia		15th											
EYOF			5th										
Bavarian Open		2nd											
Hellmut Seibt	4th												
Volvo Open Cup	3rd	4th											
Warsaw Cup	7th	5th											
National
Latvian Champ.		1st J	1st	1st	1st		1st	1st			2nd	2nd	

== Detailed results ==
ISU personal best scores in the +5/-5 GOE System
Segment	Type	Score	Event
Total	**TSS**	**150.86**	2019 CS Ice Star
Short program	**TSS**	**51.57**	2019 CS Ice Star
Short program	TES	28.12	2019 CS Ice Star
Short program	PCS	24.45	2019 CS Ice Star
Free skating	**TSS**	**99.29**	2019 CS Ice Star
Free skating	TES	49.54	2019 CS Ice Star
Free skating	PCS	49.75	2019 CS Ice Star

Current personal best scores are highlighted in bold.

=== Senior level ===
Results in the 2025-26 season
Date	Event	SP		FS		Total	
Date	Event	P	Score	P	Score	P	Score
Nov 21-23, 2025	(Latvia) 2025 Amber Cup	3	42.70	3	81.65	3	124.35
Nov 25-30, 2025	(Estonia) 2025 CS Tallinn Trophy	12	49.00	18	82.32	16	131.32

2023–2024 season
Date	Event	SP	FS	Total
8–10 December 2023	2023 Latvia Trophy	3; 52.78	4; 86.03	3; 138.81
21–24 November 2023	2023 Tallinn Trophy	10; 45.85	9; 82.42	10; 128.27
2-5 November 2023	2023 Volvo Open Cup	4; 51.71	7; 92.16	7; 143.87
6–8 October 2023	2023 CS Finlandia Trophy	16; 44.49	16; 86.26	17; 130.75
13–17 September 2023	2023 Jelgava Cup	2; 55.50	7; 90.71	6; 146.21
8–10 September 2023	2023 CS Lombardia Trophy	11; 48.87	14; 74.00	14; 122.87
2022–2023 season
Date	Event	SP	FS	Total
13–15 March 2023	2023 Winter World University Games	7; 59.05	11; 92.62	10; 151.67
17–18 December 2022	2022 Latvia Trophy	5; 55.85	6; 94.39	5; 150.24
24–27 November 2022	2022 Tallinn Trophy	4; 54.31	2; 102.58	2; 156.89
17–20 November 2022	2022 CS Warsaw Cup	10; 51.10	17; 86.79	14; 137.89
3–4 November 2022	2022 Volvo Open Cup	8; 49.61	8; 97.95	8; 147.56
2021–2022 season
Date	Event	SP	FS	Total
3–4 March 2022	2022 Tallink Hotels Cup	8; 46.78	6; 90.33	7; 137.11
1–6 February 2022	2022 Sofia Trophy	3; 51.18	3; 93.61	3; 144.79
13–14 January 2022	2022 Icelab International Cup	3; 48.09	2; 85.41	3; 133.50
16–18 November 2021	2021 Tallinn Trophy	4; 52.39	2; 102.12	2; 154.51
3–7 November 2021	2021 Volvo Open Cup	9; 46.05	6; 101.67	6; 147.72
27–30 October 2021	2021 Autumn Talents Cup	1; 46.50	1; 82.84	1; 129.34
2020–21 season
Date	Event	SP	FS	Total
22–28 March 2021	2021 World Championships	33; 47.94	–	33; 47.94
18–21 February 2021	2021 Tallink Hotels Cup	12; 46.42	16; 75.05	16; 121.47
7–8 November 2020	2020 Volvo Open Cup	1; 45.49	1; 88.80	1; 134.29
2019–20 season
Date	Event	SP	FS	Total
20–23 February 2020	2020 International Challenge Cup	19; 45.86	18; 84.65	19; 130.51
13–16 February 2020	2020 Tallink Hotels Cup	10; 48.55	10; 88.51	9; 137.06
20–26 January 2020	2020 European Championships	30; 45.09	–	30; 45.09
14–15 December 2019	2019–20 Latvian Championships	1; 52.22	1; 95.91	1; 148.13
11–17 November 2019	2019 Tallinn Trophy	5; 52.67	4; 100.88	4; 153.55
5–10 November 2019	2019 Volvo Open Cup	7; 53.18	15; 89.36	11; 142.54
18–20 October 2019	2019 CS Ice Star	8; 51.57	5; 99.29	5; 150.86
19–21 September 2019	2019 CS Ondrej Nepela Memorial	14; 45.76	19; 64.01	19; 109.77
2018–19 season
Date	Event	SP	FS	Total
6–9 March 2019	2019 Winter Universiade	8; 55.14	9; 101.96	10; 157.10
22–24 February 2019	2019 Tallink Hotels Cup	6; 44.64	7; 79.35	7; 123.99
8–13 January 2019	2019 Mentor Toruń Cup	14; 41.78	11; 79.09	13; 120.87
15–16 December 2018	2018–19 Latvian Championships	1; 49.18	1; 79.50	1; 128.68
5–8 December 2018	2018 CS Golden Spin of Zagreb	25; 38.39	14; 90.73	19; 129.12
26 November–2 December 2018	2018 CS Tallinn Trophy	22; 40.45	18; 85.20	19; 125.65
6–11 November 2018	2018 Volvo Open Cup	23; 39.23	22; 74.96	21; 114.19
2017–18 season
Date	Event	SP	FS	Total
19–25 March 2018	2018 World Championships	37; 35.78	–	37; 35.78
21–26 November 2017	2017 CS Tallinn Trophy	31; 38.00	32; 55.02	30; 93.92
26–29 October 2017	2017 CS Ice Star	16; 38.46	15; 68.74	16; 107.20
2016–17 season
Date	Event	SP	FS	Total
29 March–2 April 2017	2017 World Championships	21; 55.92	22; 99.10	22; 155.02
10–12 March 2017	2017 Coupe du Printemps	3; 51.96	2; 98.11	2; 150.07
25–29 January 2017	2017 European Championships	20; 49.05	18; 90.58	19; 139.63
10–15 January 2017	2017 Mentor Toruń Cup	2; 54.49	7; 90.62	5; 145.11
3–4 December 2016	2016–17 Latvian Championships	1; 64.24	1; 109.85	1; 174.09
20–27 November 2016	2016 CS Tallinn Trophy	5; 56.35	8; 100.47	7; 156.82
9–13 November 2016	2016 Volvo Open Cup	1; 55.09	1; 100.55	1; 155.64
4–5 November 2016	2016 Rostelecom Cup	11; 54.29	10; 96.80	10; 151.09
21–23 October 2016	2016 Skate America	11; 47.80	11; 87.17	11; 134.97
30 September–2 October 2016	2016 CS Ondrej Nepela Memorial	13; 45.87	12; 85.64	12; 131.51

=== Junior level ===
2015–16 season
Date	Event	Level	SP	FS	Total
28 March–3 April 2016	2016 World Championships	Senior	18; 54.78	14; 104.21	15; 158.99
14–20 March 2016	2016 World Junior Championships	Junior	6; 57.92	8; 103.37	7; 161.29
25–31 January 2016	2016 European Championships	Senior	5; **58.99**	4; **118.00**	4; **176.99**
6–10 January 2016	2016 Mentor Toruń Cup	Senior	1; 58.14	2; 94.29	1; 152.43
12–13 December 2015	2015–16 Latvian Championships	Senior	1; 48.19	1; 108.97	1; 157.16
20–25 October 2015	2015 CS Denkova-Staviski Cup	Senior	3; 55.22	2; 108.04	2; 163.26
18–22 November 2015	2015 CS Tallinn Trophy	Senior	4; 52.86	6; 103.26	5; 156.12
4–8 November 2015	2015 Volvo Open Cup	Senior	3; 50.05	5; 86.78	5; 136.83
1–3 October 2015	2015 CS Ondrej Nepela Trophy	Senior	7; 53.38	10; 97.00	10; 150.38
2014–15 season
Date	Event	Level	SP	FS	Total
23–29 March 2015	2015 World Championships	Senior	23; 45.74	16; 95.80	16; 141.54
26 January–1 February 2015	2015 European Championships	Senior	17; 49.28	5; 107.09	7; 156.37
26–28 January 2015	2015 European Youth Olympic Winter Festival	Junior	5; 46.46	5; 80.00	5; 126.46
7–10 January 2015	2015 Mentor Toruń Cup	Senior	2; 51.84	1; 104.31	1; 156.15
13–14 December 2014	2014–15 Latvian Championships	Senior	2; 53.86	1; 85.94	1; 139.80
3–7 December 2014	2014 Tallinn Trophy	Senior	1; 57.28	2; 99.00	1; 156.28
5–9 November 2014	2014 CS Volvo Open Cup	Senior	5; 47.12	1; 98.96	1; 146.08
21–24 November 2014	2014 CS Warsaw Cup	Senior	13; 38.20	5; 86.90	7; 125.10
24–27 September 2014	2014 JGP Estonia	Junior	6; 49.21	7; 86.57	7; 135.78
3–6 September 2014	2014 JGP Czech Republic	Junior	7; 48.48	8; 88.57	7; 137.05
2013–14 season
Date	Event	Level	SP	FS	Total
10–16 March 2014	2014 World Junior Championships	Junior	20; 42.77	20; 70.37	19; 113.14
29 January–2 February 2014	2014 Bavarian Open	Junior	4; 44.87	2; 86.74	2; 131.61
6–8 December 2013	2013–14 Latvian Junior Championships	Junior	1; 43.99	1; 84.43	1; 128.42
13–17 November 2013	2013 Warsaw Cup	Junior	5; 41.61	5; 75.49	5; 117.10
7–10 November 2013	2013 Volvo Open Cup	Junior	6; 43.28	2; 85.99	4; 129.27
25–28 September 2013	2013 JGP Belarus	Junior	13; 43.22	23; 56.41	19; 99.63
12–15 September 2013	2013 JGP Slovakia	Junior	12; 41.09	14; 74.43	15; 115.52
2012–13 season
Date	Event	Level	SP	FS	Total
25 February–3 March 2013	2013 World Junior Championships	Junior	22; 42.11	19; 72.00	20; 114.11
13–16 February 2013	2013 Hellmut Seibt Memorial	Junior	6; 41.17	4; 79.60	4; 120.77
10–13 January 2012	2012 Volvo Open Cup	Junior	3; 43.86	2; 82.56	3; 126.42
15–18 November 2013	2012 Warsaw Cup	Junior	13; 33.78	4; 75.56	7; 109.34
22–25 August 2012	2012 JGP France	Junior	22; 29.23	10; 74.68	16; 103.91
