= Latvian Figure Skating Championships =

Annual figure skating competition

- Status: Active
- Genre: National championships
- Frequency: Annual
- Country: Latvia
- Inaugurated: 1992
- Organizer: Latvian Skating Association

The Latvian Figure Skating Championships (Latvian: Latvijas čempionāts daiļslidošanā) are an annual figure skating competition organized by the Latvian Skating Association (Latvian: Latvijas Slidošanas Asociācija) to crown the national champions of Latvia. The first national championships held after Latvia's independence from the Soviet Union took place in Riga in 1992. On three occasions, Latvia has hosted an international competition (the Latvian Trophy), and on two occasions, Latvia and Lithuania co-hosted joint competitions, all of which served as Latvia's national championships.

Medals are awarded in men's singles, women's singles, pair skating, and ice dance at the senior and junior levels, although each discipline may not necessarily be held every year due to a lack of participants. Deniss Vasiļjevs currently holds the record for winning the most Latvian Championship titles in men's singles (with seven), while Angelīna Kučvaļska and Alma Lepina are tied for winning the most titles in women's singles (with five). Oļegs Šļahovs and Elena Berezhnaya won the most titles in pair skating as a team (with three); Šļahovs won an additional title with a subsequent partner, and is thus tied with Jurijs Saļmanovs for winning the most titles in pair skating as an individual (with four each). Elena Garkushina and Andrei Sitik hold the record in ice dance (with three), while Garkushina won an additional title with a subsequent partner.

== History ==
Estonia, Latvia, and Lithuania were annexed by the Soviet Union in 1944, but finally achieved independence in August 1991. The first national championships held after Latvia's independence took place in Riga in April 1992. Andrejs Vlaščenko won the men's event after his only competitor, Konstantin Kostin, withdrew from the competition. Alma Lepina won the women's event, and Jeļena Trocenko and Vasilijs Serkovs won the ice dance event.

Controversy arose after the 1993 Latvian Championships when Andrejs Vlaščenko, who had finished in second place, allegedly refused his silver medal and threw away his diploma. Vlaščenko claimed he gave the medal to his brother, while his coach threw out the diploma. Tatjana Strautmane, president of the Latvian Skating Association, annulled his second-place finish, while the full association's presidium later voted to suspend Vlaščenko for the rest of the season. Scandal continued to follow Vlaščenko during his tenure on the Latvian national team. When members of the team met to sign their contracts with the skating federation in June 1993, Vlaščenko failed to appear. The skating federation received a letter soon after from the German Ice Skating Union asking that Vlaščenko be released to allow him to compete for Germany. In 1994, it was discovered that Vlaščenko had applied for German citizenship, having been receiving financial assistance from the German skating federation, even while still representing Latvia in international competition, including at the 1994 Winter Olympics.

Figure skating in Latvia has long been hampered by a lack of resources, including available ice, financing, and interest from the general public; as well as low student enrollment. In 1993, the indoor ice rink at the Daugava Stadium was described as "very unpleasant" with concrete showing through the ice surface. The 1994 Latvian Championships featured precisely one man, one woman, one pairs team, and one ice dance team at the senior level. The Latvian Skating Association often invited guest skaters from neighboring countries, such as Estonia, Lithuania, Finland, and Russia, to fill out the competition, and even then, the guest skaters were not top-level competitors. It was only in late 1998 that the Liepāja Olympic Hall in Liepāja, the first artificial ice rink in Latvia following its independence, was built. In 2010 and 2017, combined championship competitions were held with Lithuania. In 2012, 2022, and 2023, Latvia hosted an international competition – the Latvian Open; later renamed the Latvian Trophy – which also served as their national championships. In all of these cases, the top Latvian skaters were recognized as the Latvian champions.

== Senior medalists ==
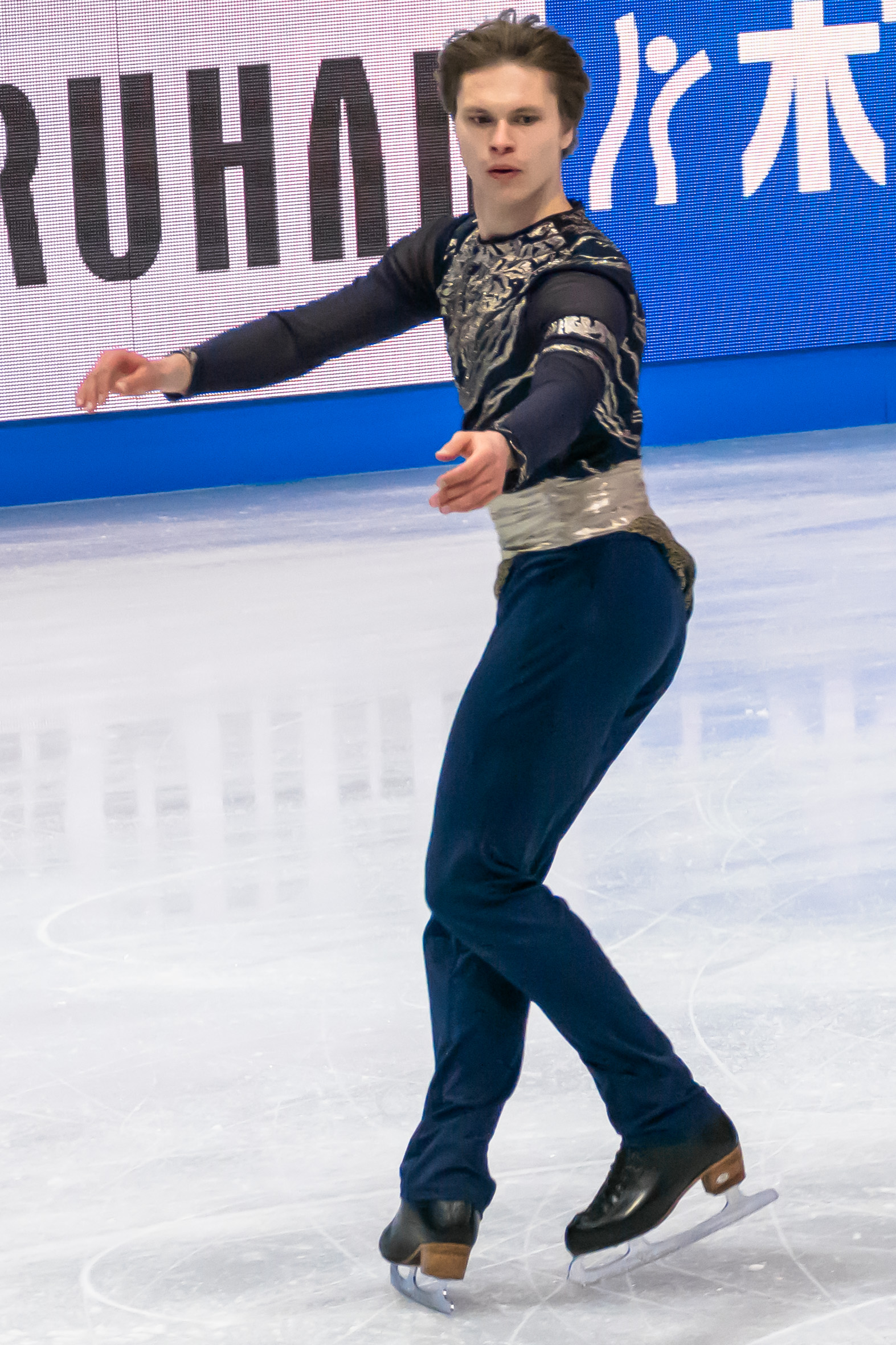
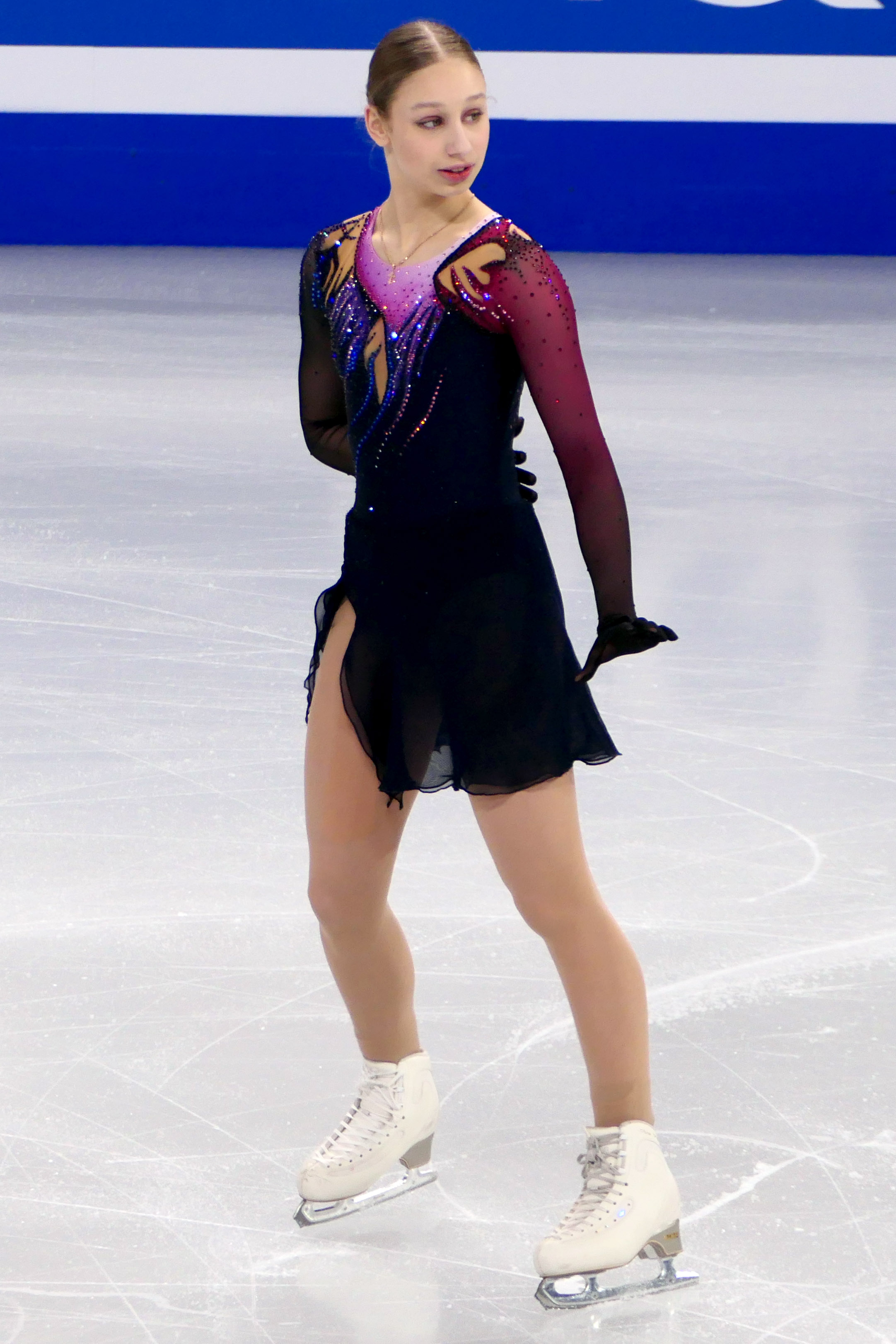
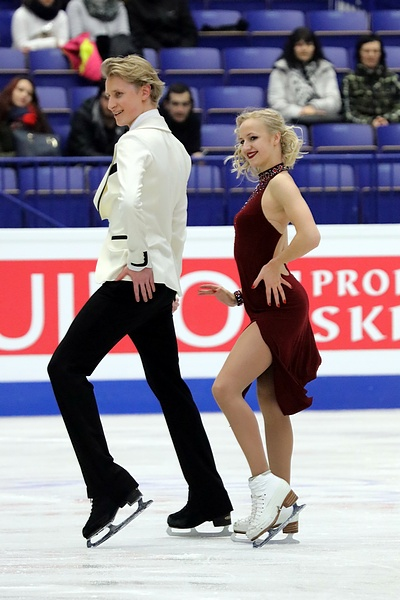
From left to right: Deniss Vasiļjevs, seven-time Latvian champion in men's singles; Sofja Stepčenko, two-time Latvian champion in women's singles; and Olga Jakušina and Andrey Nevskiy, two-time Latvian champions in ice dance

=== Men's singles ===
Senior men's event medalists
Year	Location	Gold	Silver	Bronze	Ref.
1992	Riga	Andrejs Vlaščenko	No other competitors		
1993	Riga	Konstantin Kostin	Andrejs Vlaščenko (Note: Andrejs Vlaščenko's second-place finish was annulled by the president of the Latvian Skating Association for unsportsmanlike conduct.)	No other competitors	
1994	Riga	Andrejs Vlaščenko	No other competitors		
1995–97	Riga	No senior men's competitors			
1998	Riga	No competition held			
1999–2005	Riga	No senior men's competitors			
2006	Sigulda	Romans Panteļejevs	Andrejs Brovenko	Dmitrijs Kašs	
2007–09	Riga	No senior men's competitors			
2010	Riga	Saulius Ambrulevičius (Lithuania) (Note: Girts Jekabsons was named the 2010 Latvian champion in the men's event, because he was the highest-scoring skater from Latvia.)	Girts Jekabsons	No other competitors	
2011	Riga	Girts Jekabsons	No other competitors		
2012	Riga	Girts Jekabsons	No other competitors		
2013–15	No senior men's competitors				
2016	Riga	Deniss Vasiļjevs	Gļebs Basins	Lukas Kaugars	
2017	Ventspils	Deniss Vasiļjevs	Gļebs Basins	No other competitors	
2018	Mārupe	Deniss Vasiļjevs	No other competitors		
2019	Mārupe	No senior men's competitors			
2020	Mārupe	Deniss Vasiļjevs	No other competitors		
2021–22	No competitions held				
2023	Riga	Deniss Vasiļjevs	No other competitors		
2024	Riga	Deniss Vasiļjevs	Fedirs Kuļišs	No other competitors	
2025	Riga	Deniss Vasiļjevs	Fedirs Kuļišs	No other competitors	
2026	Riga	Fedirs Kuļišs	Kirills Korkacs	No other competitors	

=== Women's singles ===
Senior women's event medalists
Year	Location	Gold	Silver	Bronze	Ref.
1992	Riga	Alma Lepina	Ingūna Lukaševica	Aija Balode	
1993	Riga	Alma Lepina	No other competitors		
1994	Riga	Alma Lepina	No other competitors		
1995	Riga	Alma Lepina	No other competitors		
1996	Riga	Alma Lepina	Valeria Trifancova	Jeļena Sirohvatova	
1997	Riga	Valeria Trifancova	Olga Vassiljeva (Estonia)	No other competitors	
1998	Riga	No competition held			
1999	Riga	Valeria Trifancova	No other competitors		
2000	Riga	Valeria Trifancova	Jūlija Šelepena	No other competitors	
2001	Riga	No senior women's competitors			
2002	Riga	Aleksandra Petuško	Olga Zadvornova	Maria Balaba	
2003	Riga	Aleksandra Petuško	Yulia Tepliha	No other competitors	
2004	Riga	Maria Balaba	Elena Kovalova	Olga Zadvornova	
2005	Riga	Maria Balaba	Elena Kovalova	Olga Zadvornova	
2006	Sigulda	Olga Zadvornova	Maria Balaba	Anna Strazdiņa	
2007	Riga	Žanna Pugača	Maria Balaba	Stasija Rage	
2008	Riga	Stasija Rage	No other competitors		
2009	Riga	Žanna Pugača	No other competitors		
2010	Riga	Žanna Pugača	Beatričė Rožinskaitė (Lithuania)	Aida Rybalko (Lithuania)	
2011	Riga	Žanna Pugača	Stasija Rage	Kristine Ozola	
2012	Riga	Alīna Fjodorova	Stasija Rage	Dana Gerasimova	
2013	Riga	No senior women's competitors			
2014	Jelgava	Alīna Fjodorova	No other competitors		
2015	Tukums	Angelīna Kučvaļska	Ieva Gaile	Karlina Monika Pole	
2016	Riga	Angelīna Kučvaļska	Alīna Fjodorova	No other competitors	
2017	Ventspils	Angelīna Kučvaļska	Elžbieta Kropa (Lithuania)	Deimantė Kizalaitė (Lithuania)	
2018	Mārupe	Diāna Ņikitina	Darja Šatibelko	No other competitors	
2019	Mārupe	Angelīna Kučvaļska	Elizabete Jubkāne	Anastasija Pavlovica	
2020	Mārupe	Angelīna Kučvaļska	No other competitors		
2021–22	No competitions held				
2023	Riga	Sofja Stepčenko	Angelīna Kučvaļska	Elizabete Jubkāne	
2024	Riga	Sofja Stepčenko	Angelīna Kučvaļska	Anastasija Konga	
2025	Riga	Anastasija Konga	Sofja Stepčenko	Emilija Ozola	
2026	Riga	Nikola Fomchenkova	Ksenija Heimane	Emilija Ozola	

=== Pairs ===
Elena Berezhnaya and Oļegs Šļahovs were forced to withdraw from the 1996 Latvian Championships after the first day due to illness.

Senior pairs' event medalists
Year	Location	Gold	Silver	Bronze	Ref.
1992	Riga	No senior pairs competitors			
1993	Riga	Elena Berezhnaya; Oļegs Šļahovs	No other competitors		
1994	Riga	Elena Berezhnaya; Oļegs Šļahovs	No other competitors		
1995	Riga	Elena Berezhnaya; Oļegs Šļahovs	No other competitors		
1996	Riga	No senior pairs competitors			
1997	Riga	Jelena Sirokhvatova; Oļegs Šļahovs	No other competitors		
1998	Riga	No competition held			
1999	Riga	Tatjana Zaharjeva; Jurijs Saļmanovs	No other competitors		
2000	Riga	Tatjana Zaharjeva; Jurijs Saļmanovs	No other competitors		
2001	Riga	No senior pairs competitors			
2002	Riga	Jelena Sirokhvatova; Jurijs Saļmanovs	No other competitors		
2003	Riga	Natālija Jefremova; Jurijs Saļmanovs	Olga Boguslavska; Andrejs Brovenko	No other competitors	
2004	Riga	Olga Boguslavska; Andrejs Brovenko	No other competitors		
2005	Riga	Olga Boguslavska; Andrejs Brovenko	No other competitors		
No senior pairs competitors since 2005

=== Ice dance ===
Alexandr Kirsanov, the 2000 Latvian Champion in ice dance with his partner Barbara Hanley, was returning from the 2025 U.S. Figure Skating Championships with two of his students aboard American Airlines Flight 5342 when their airplane collided with a helicopter upon approach to Ronald Reagan Washington National Airport and plunged into the Potomac River. All aboard were killed, including twenty-eight skaters, coaches, and family members returning from the U.S. Championships.

Senior ice dance event medalists
Year	Location	Gold	Silver	Bronze	Ref.
1992	Riga	Jeļena Trocenko; Vasilijs Serkovs	Jeļenai Lavrenovai; Vjačeslavam Hvostikovam	No other competitors	
1993	Riga	Jaroslava Ņečajeva; Jurijs Češņičenko	Jeļena Trocenko; Ēriks Samovičs	No other competitors	
1994	Riga	Anastasija Grebjonkina; Ēriks Samovičs	No other competitors		
1995	Riga	No senior ice dance competitors			
1996	Riga	Ilze Rašenbauma; Maksims Riks	No other competitors		
1997	Riga	Jane Dalen; Juris Razgulajevs	Ilze Rašenbauma; Maksims Riks	No other competitors	
1998	Riga	No competition held			
1999	Riga	Marina Kudrjavceva; Maksims Riks	Martina Korzane; Janis Zakis	No other competitors	
2000	Riga	Barbara Hanley; Alexandr Kirsanov	No other competitors		
2001–03	Riga	No senior ice dance competitors			
2004	Riga	Elena Garkushina; Andrei Sitik	Maria Zinjanova; Stanislavs Carkovs	No other competitors	
2005	Riga	Maria Zinjanova; Stanislavs Carkovs	No other competitors		
2006	Riga	Elena Garkushina; Andrei Sitik	No other competitors		
2007	Riga	Elena Garkushina; Andrei Sitik	Anna Liepina; Pavel Liepins	No other competitors	
2008	Riga	Elena Garkushina; Aleksandrs Motorins	No other competitors		
2009–17	No senior ice dance competitors				
2018	Mārupe	Aurelija Ipolito; Malcolm Jones	No other competitors		
2019	Mārupe	No senior ice dance competitors			
2020	Mārupe	Aurelija Ipolito; Malcolm Jones	No other competitors		
No senior ice dance competitors since 2020

== Junior medalists ==
While junior-level championships were held in Latvia prior to 2008, this is earliest for which full results have been documented.

=== Men's singles ===
Junior men's event medalists
Year	Location	Gold	Silver	Bronze	Ref.
2008	Riga	No junior men's competitors			
2009	Riga	Girts Jekabsons	No other competitors		
2010	Riga	Artūras Ganžela (Lithuania) (Note: There was no 2010 Latvian junior champion in the men's event, because the only competitor in the event, Artūras Ganžėla, was from Lithuania.)	No other competitors		
2011	Riga	Germans Salass	Maksims Rozkans	No other competitors	
2012	Riga	Germans Salass	Maksims Kirilovs	No other competitors	
2013	Riga	No junior men's competitors			
2014	Jelgava	Deniss Vasiļjevs	Gļebs Basins	No other competitors	
2015	Tukums	Deniss Vasiļjevs	No other competitors		
2016	Riga	Daniels Roščiks	No other competitors		
2017	Ventspils	Daniels Roščiks	Aleksandras Chitrenko (Lithuania)	No other competitors	
2018	Mārupe	Kims Georgs Pavlovs	Daniels Roščiks	Aleksejs Mazaļevskis	
2019	Mārupe	Kims Georgs Pavlovs	No other competitors		
2020	Mārupe	Daniels Kočkers	No other competitors		
2021–22	No competitions held				
2023	Riga	Kirils Korkačs	Antons Trofimovs	Ratmirs Bekišbajevs	
2024	Riga	Kirils Korkačs	Nikolajs Krivošeja	Akims Kirilovs	
2025	Riga	Jānis Znotiņš	Kirils Korkačs	Ratmirs Bekišbajevs	
2026	Riga	Jānis Znotiņš	Nikolajs Krivošeja	Ratmirs Bekišbajevs	

=== Women's singles ===
Junior women's event medalists
Year	Location	Gold	Silver	Bronze	Ref.
2008	Riga	Žanna Pugača	Anna Rage	Dana Gerasimova	
2009	Riga	Alīna Fjodorova	Anna Rage	Dana Gerasimova	
2010	Riga	Alīna Fjodorova	Rimgaile Meskaitė (Lithuania)	Anna Biguna	
2011	Riga	Alīna Fjodorova	Karina Rutlauka	Samanta Kovalkova	
2012	Riga	Karine Rutlauka	Ieva Gaile	Samanta Kovalkova	
2013	Riga	Alīna Fjodorova	Ieva Gaile	Angelīna Kučvaļska	
2014	Jelgava	Angelīna Kučvaļska	Ieva Gaile	Kristina Gaile	
2015	Tukums	Diāna Ņikitina	Darja Šatibelko	Vlada Ljaha	
2016	Riga	Diāna Ņikitina	Aleksandra Butko	Anželika Kļujeva	
2017	Ventspils	Elizabete Jubkāne	Greta Morkytė (Lithuania)	Darja Šatibelko	
2018	Mārupe	Anete Lāce	Nikoļa Mažgane	Polina Andrejeva	
2019	Mārupe	Anete Lāce	Arina Somova	Polina Andrejeva	
2020	Mārupe	Anete Lāce	Mariia Bolsheva	Anastasija Konga	
2021–22	No competitions held				
2023	Riga	Nikola Fomcenkova	Lueta Silina	Paula Nelsone	
2024	Riga	Kira Baranovska	Nikola Fomcenkova	Jelizaveta Derecina	
2025	Riga	Kira Baranovska	Natasa Jermolicka	Ksenija Heimane	
2026	Riga	Kira Baranovska	Paula Belevica	Natasa Jermolicka	

=== Pairs ===
Junior pairs' event medalists
Year	Location	Gold	Silver	Bronze	Ref.
2008–12	No junior pairs competitors				
2013	Riga	Jekaterina Pribilova; Jegors Admiralovs	No other competitors		
2014–25	No junior pairs competitors				
2026	Riga	Alexandra Gubareva; Bruno Trukå Ans	No other competitors		

=== Ice dance ===
Junior ice dance event medalists
Year	Location	Gold	Silver	Bronze	Ref.
2008	Riga	Jekaterina Sergejeva; Andrejs Sitiks	Ksenia Smirnova; Aleksandrs Jakushin	No other competitors	
2009	Riga	Ksenia Pecherkina; Aleksandrs Jakushin	Jekaterina Sergejeva; Andrejs Sitiks	No other competitors	
No junior ice dance competitors since 2009

== Latvia Trophy ==
=== 2012 Latvian Open ===
2012 Latvian Open medalists
Disc.	Gold	Silver	Bronze
Senior men	(Belarus) Dmitry Kagirov	(Armenia) Sarkis Hayrapetyan	(Latvia) Girts Jekabsons
Senior women	(Latvia) Alīna Fjodorova	(Latvia) Stasija Rage	(Latvia) Dana Gerasimova
Junior men	(Armenia) Slavik Hayrapetyan	(Latvia) Germans Salashs	(Latvia) Maksims Kirilovs
Junior women	(Latvia) Karina Rutlauka	(Latvia) Ieva Gaile	(Latvia) Samanta Kovalkova

=== 2022 Latvia Trophy ===
2022 Latvia Trophy medalists
Disc.	Gold	Silver	Bronze
Senior men	(Latvia) Deniss Vasiļjevs	(Ukraine) Gleb Smotrov	No other competitors
Senior women	(Latvia) Sofja Stepčenko	(Belgium) Nina Pinzarrone	(Cyprus) Marilena Kitromilis
Junior men	(Ukraine) Kyrylo Marsak	(Latvia) Kirills Korkacs	(Lithuania) Daniel Korabelnik
Junior women	(Estonia) Maria Eliise Kaljuvere	(Latvia) Nikola Fomcenkova	(Cyprus) Stefania Yakovleva

=== 2023 Latvia Trophy ===
2023 Latvia Trophy medalists
Disc.	Gold	Silver	Bronze
Senior men	(Latvia) Deniss Vasiļjevs	(Israel) Lev Vinokur	(Latvia) Fedirs Kuļišs
Senior women	(Latvia) Sofja Stepčenko	(Georgia (country)) Alina Urushadze	(Latvia) Angelīna Kučvaļska
Junior men	(Italy) Raffaele Francesco Zich	(Ukraine) Valerii Karasov	(Italy) Tommaso Barison
Junior women	(Italy) Noemi Joos	(Poland) Noelle Streuli	(Latvia) Kira Baranovska

== Records ==
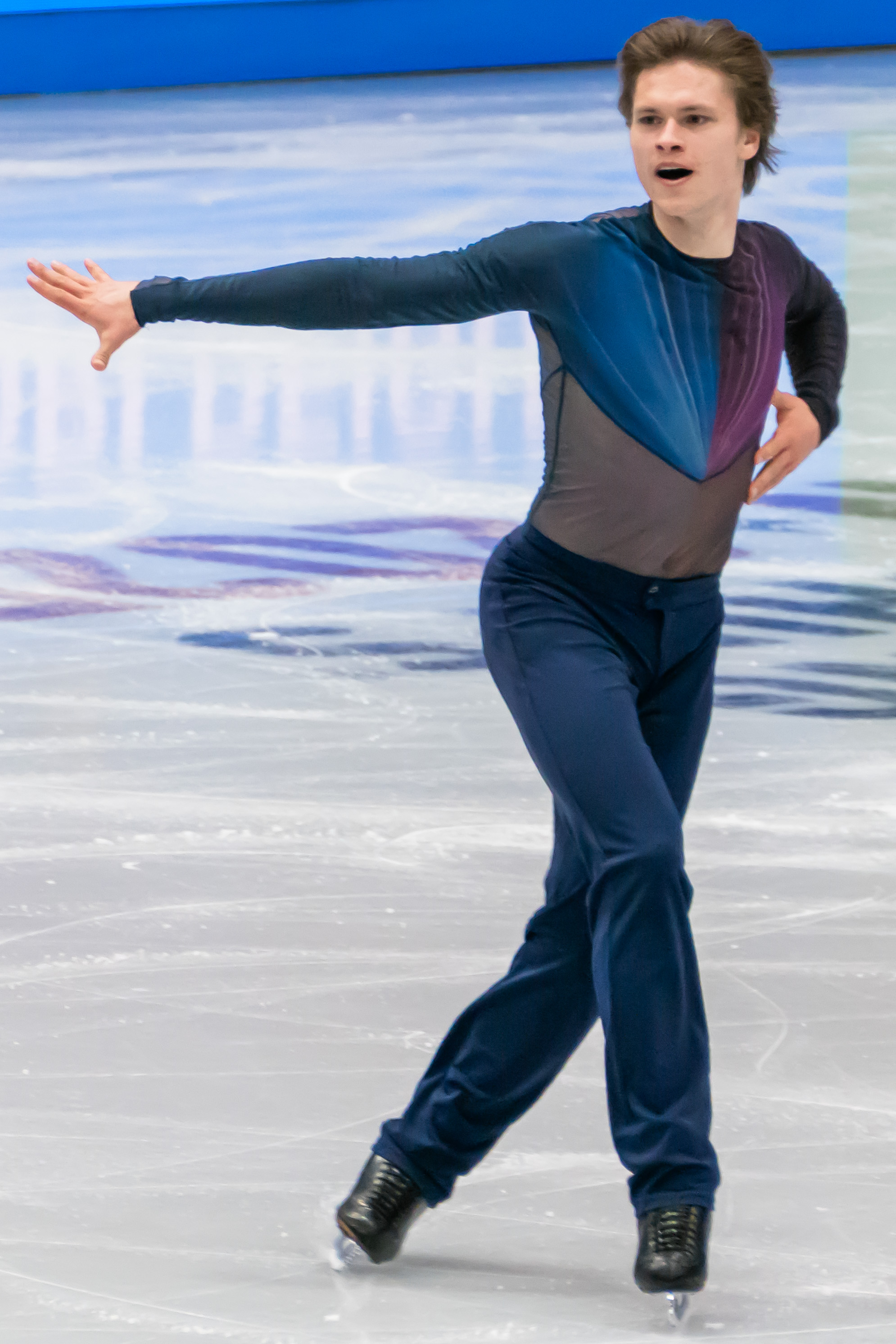
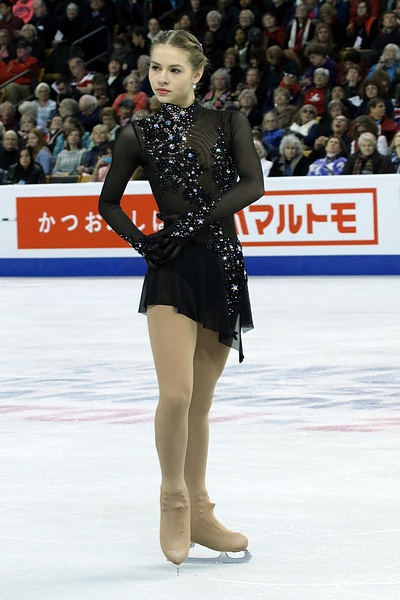
From left to right: Deniss Vasiļjevs has won seven Latvian Championship titles in men's singles, while Angelīna Kučvaļska won five Latvian Championship titles in women's singles.

Records
Discipline	Most championship titles			
Discipline	Skater(s)	No.	Years	Ref.
Men's singles	Deniss Vasiļjevs	7	2016–18; 2020; 2023–25	
Women's singles	Angelīna Kučvaļska	5	2015–17; 2019–20	
Women's singles	Alma Lepina	5	1992–96	
Pairs	Jurijs Saļmanovs; (Note: Jurijs Saļmanovs won two championship titles with Tatjana Zaharjeva (1999–2000), one with Jelena Sirokhvatova (2002), and one with Natālija Jefremova (2003).)	4	1999–2000; 2002–03	
Pairs	Oļegs Šļahovs; (Note: Oļegs Šļahovs won three championship titles with Jeļena Berežnaja (1993–95), and one with Jelena Sirokhvatova (1997).)	4	1993–95; 1997	
Ice dance	Elena Garkushina; (Note: Elena Garkushina won three championship titles with Andrei Sitik (2004, 2006–07), and one with Aleksandrs Motorins (2008).)	4	2004; 2006–08	
Ice dance	Elena Garkushina; Andrei Sitik	3	2004; 2006–07	
