= Rebeka Kim =

South Korean figure skater (born 1998)

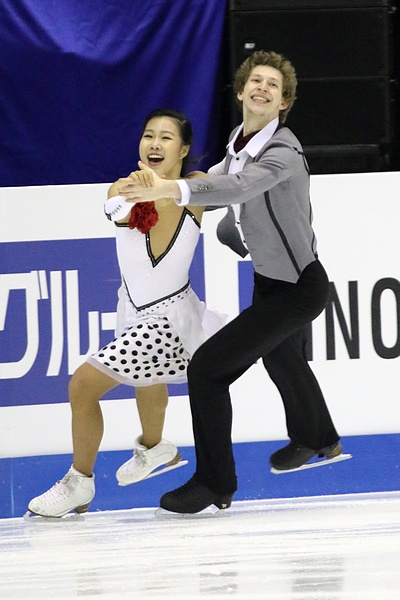

Personal information
- Born: January 27, 1998 (age 28) Vilnius, Lithuania
- Height: 1.60 m (5 ft 3 in)

Figure skating career
- Country: South Korea
- Partner: Kirill Minov
- Coach: Pasquale Camerlengo; Anjelika Krylova
- Began skating: 2006
- Retired: 2016

Rebeka Kim (Korean: 김레베카, born January 27, 1998) is a South Korean former competitive ice dancer. With partner Kirill Minov, she is the 2016 South Korean national champion and placed sixth at the 2014 World Junior Championships. Earlier in her career, Kim competed in single skating. She is the 2009 and 2010 Toruń Cup novice champion.

== Personal life ==
Kim grew up in Vilnius, Lithuania but has kept her citizenship as Korean. She speaks Russian, Korean, English and Lithuanian fluently. In 2010, she moved with her family to Moscow, Russia for her skating training.

== Career ==
=== Single skating ===
Kim began figure skating at age 7 and initially competed in single skating. She won the novice ladies' title at the 2009 Lithuanian Championships. In 2009, the Korean media dubbed her "another Kim Yuna". In February 2009, the KBS Global network Korean ran a documentary on Rebeka Kim.

=== Ice dancing ===
==== Junior level ====
In 2012, Kim began competing in ice dancing with partner Kirill Minov, representing South Korea. They are coached by Irina Zhuk and Alexander Svinin. Kim/Minov were assigned to 2012–13 ISU Junior Grand Prix events in Austria and Croatia. They missed the first event waiting for the International Skating Union to grant permission for Minov's change of country — he was cleared to represent South Korea on September 21, 2012. Kim/Minov finished 10th in their international debut in Croatia. They qualified for the free dance at the 2013 World Junior Championships in Milan and finished 20th overall.

In November 2013, Kim/Minov won the junior ice dance event at the 2013 NRW Trophy which made them the first Korean ice dance team to win an international event. They placed sixth at the 2014 World Junior Championships in Sofia.

==== Senior level ====
Kim/Minov started their first senior season at an ISU Challenger Series event, the 2014 Nebelhorn Trophy, where they placed 7th. They received two Grand Prix assignments, the 2014 Rostelecom Cup and 2014 Trophee Eric Bompard. They are the first Korean ice dancing team to participate in any ISU Grand Prix event. At the Volvo Open Cup, Kim/Minov placed 3rd in total and they became the first Korean ice dancing team to medal at the ISU event.

== Programs ==
=== With Minov ===
Season	Short dance	Free dance	Exhibition
2015–2016	Waltz: La Valse à Margaux by Richard Galliano; Foxtrot: La Destin t'a donné ta chance by Dany Brillant; Waltz: La Valse à Margaux by Richard Galliano; Love Makes the World Go 'Round by Perry Como; Waltz: La Valse à Margaux by Richard Galliano; Bim Bam by Sam Butera	Tobacco Road by Lou Rawls; Party Rockers by Gordon Goodwin's Big Phat Band featuring Judith Hill	
2014–2015	Paso doble: El Conquistador by Maxime Rodriguez	Phantasia (based on The Phantom of the Opera) by Sarah Chang, Julian Lloyd Webber; The Phantom of the Opera performed by Lindsey Stirling	
2013–2014	Quickstep: Show Me How You Burlesque (from Burlesque); Foxtrot: Speaking of Happiness by Gloria Lynne; Quickstep: Show Me How You Burlesque	Sheherazade by Nikolai Rimsky-Korsakov	Sheherazade by Nikolai Rimsky-Korsakov; Blues; Swing
2012–2013	Blues: Swing:	Midnight in Moscow by Scorpions	

== Competitive highlights ==
=== Ice dancing with Minov ===
International
Event	2012–13	2013–14	2014–15	2015–16
Worlds			26th	25th
Four Continents			9th	11th
GP Bompard			7th	
GP Rostelecom			8th	6th
CS Mordovian				6th
CS Nebelhorn			7th	
CS Volvo Cup			3rd	1st
Ice Star				3rd
International: Junior
Junior Worlds	20th	6th		
JGP Belarus		4th		
JGP Croatia	10th			
JGP Slovakia		5th		
Bavarian Open	4th J.	6th J.		
NRW Trophy	6th J.	1st J.		
Panin Memorial	1st J.			
National
South Korean				1st
Team events
Team Challenge; Cup				3rd T (6th P)
GP = Grand Prix; CS = Challenger Series; JGP = Junior Grand Prix; J. = Junior level; WD = Withdrew; T: Team result, P: Personal result

=== Single skating ===
International
Event	2008–09	2009–10
Toruń Cup	1st N.	1st N.
N. = Novice level

== Detailed results ==
=== Post–2014 ===
2015–16 season
Date	Event	SD	FD	Total
February 16–21, 2016	2016 ISU Four Continents Championships	13; 44.69	11; 78.00	11; 122.69
January 8–10, 2016	2016 South Korean Championships	1; 55.43	1; 82.57	1; 138.00
November 20–22, 2015	GP 2015 Rostelecom Cup	7; 51.83	6; 83.12	6; 134.95
November 4–8, 2015	2015 Volvo Open Cup	1; 56.61	1; 87.33	1; 143.94
October 15–18, 2015	CS 2015 Mordovian Ornament	7; 51.26	5; **86.02**	6; **137.28**
October 9–11, 2015	2015 Ice Star	3; 52.70	3; 85.80	3; 138.50
2014–15 season
Date	Event	SD	FD	Total
March 23–26, 2015	2015 ISU World Championships	26; 45.09	- -	26; 45.09
February 9–15, 2015	2015 ISU Four Continents Championships	9; 46.54	9; 74.22	9; 120.76
November 21–23, 2014	GP 2014 Trophee Eric Bompard	7; 45.66	7; 70.29	7; 115.95
November 14–16, 2014	GP 2014 Rostelecom Cup	8; 46.14	8; 72.13	8; 118.27
November 5–9, 2014	CS 2014 Volvo Open Cup	4; 53.28	3; 79.58	3; 132.86
September 26–27, 2014	CS Nebelhorn Trophy	10; 38.61	7; 69.20	7; 107.81

=== Pre–2014 ===
2013–14 season
Date	Event	Level	SD	FD	Total
March 10–16, 2014	2014 ISU World Junior Championships	Junior	6; **55.33**	7; 78.02	6; 133.35
Jan. 29 - Feb. 2, 2014	Bavarian Open	Junior	7; 43.48	5; 67.94	6; 111.42
November 1–3, 2013	NRW Trophy	Junior	1; 53.68	2; 76.91	1; 130.59
September 25–28, 2013	ISU JGP Minsk	Junior	4; 50.84	4; 69.22	4; 120.06
September 12–15, 2013	ISU JGP Kosice	Junior	5; 49.38	4; 72.12	5; 121.50

- ISU Personal bests highlighted in **bold**
