= Lithuanian Figure Skating Championships =

Recurring figure skating competition

- Status: Active
- Genre: National championships
- Begins: 1993
- Frequency: Annual
- Country: Lithuania
- Organiser: Lithuanian Skating Federation

The Lithuanian Figure Skating Championships (Lithuanian: Lietuvos dailiojo čiuožimo čempionatas) are an annual figure skating competition organized by the Lithuanian Skating Federation (Lithuanian: Lietuvos čiuožimo federacija) to crown the national champions of Lithuania. The championships originally scheduled for 1992 were cancelled when the Lithuanian government stripped all funding from the Lithuanian Skating Federation. Therefore, the first national championships held after Lithuania's independence from the Soviet Union took place in Kaunas in 1993. On two occasions, Latvia and Lithuania co-hosted joint competitions, both of which served as Lithuania's national championships.

Medals are awarded in men's singles, women's singles, pair skating, and ice dance at the senior and junior levels, although each discipline may not necessarily be held every year due to a lack of participants. Saulius Ambrulevičius holds the record for winning the most Lithuanian Championship titles in men's singles (with seven), a feat he accomplished before switching to ice dance, while Aleksandra Golovkina-Dolinskė holds the record in women's singles (with six). Goda Butkutė and Nikita Ermolaev hold the record in pair skating (with five); however, they are the only pairs team Lithuania has had compete at the senior level. Margarita Drobiazko and Povilas Vanagas hold the record in ice dance (with twelve).

== History ==
Estonia, Latvia, and Lithuania were annexed by the Soviet Union in 1944, but finally achieved independence in August 1991. The 1992 Lithuanian Championships were cancelled when Algis Dobrovolskas, then-Deputy Prime Minister of Lithuania, ordered in April 1992 that all federal funding for the Lithuanian Skating Federation be stopped after Margarita Drobiazko and Povilas Vanagas competed in ice dance at the Winter Olympics, World Championships, and European Championships, as Drobiazko was not yet a Lithuanian citizen, despite being married to a Lithuanian. In his decree, Dobrovolskas wrote that the use of "funds from the state budget of the Republic of Lithuania to support athletes from other countries and finance their participation in various competitions will not be tolerated and financed by the Government of the Republic of Lithuania". Drobiazko was ultimately granted Lithuanian citizenship in 1993 for her "merits in sport and for promoting the country's name".

Figure skating in Lithuania has been hampered by a lack of resources. In 1993, there were only two operable ice rinks in Lithuania – one in Kaunas and one in Elektrėnai – and the cost was prohibitive. The Lithuanian Skating Federation also had difficulty attracting international competitors from whom they hoped Lithuanian skaters could learn. In November 1993, the Lithuanian Skating Federation invited guest skaters from neighboring nations to fill out the national championships, because the Lithuanian team at that time featured only one man, who withdrew from the competition after the first day due to injury, four women, and one ice dance team.

In 2010 and 2017, combined championship competitions were held with Latvia. The results were separated to form national podiums for each nation.

== Senior medalists ==
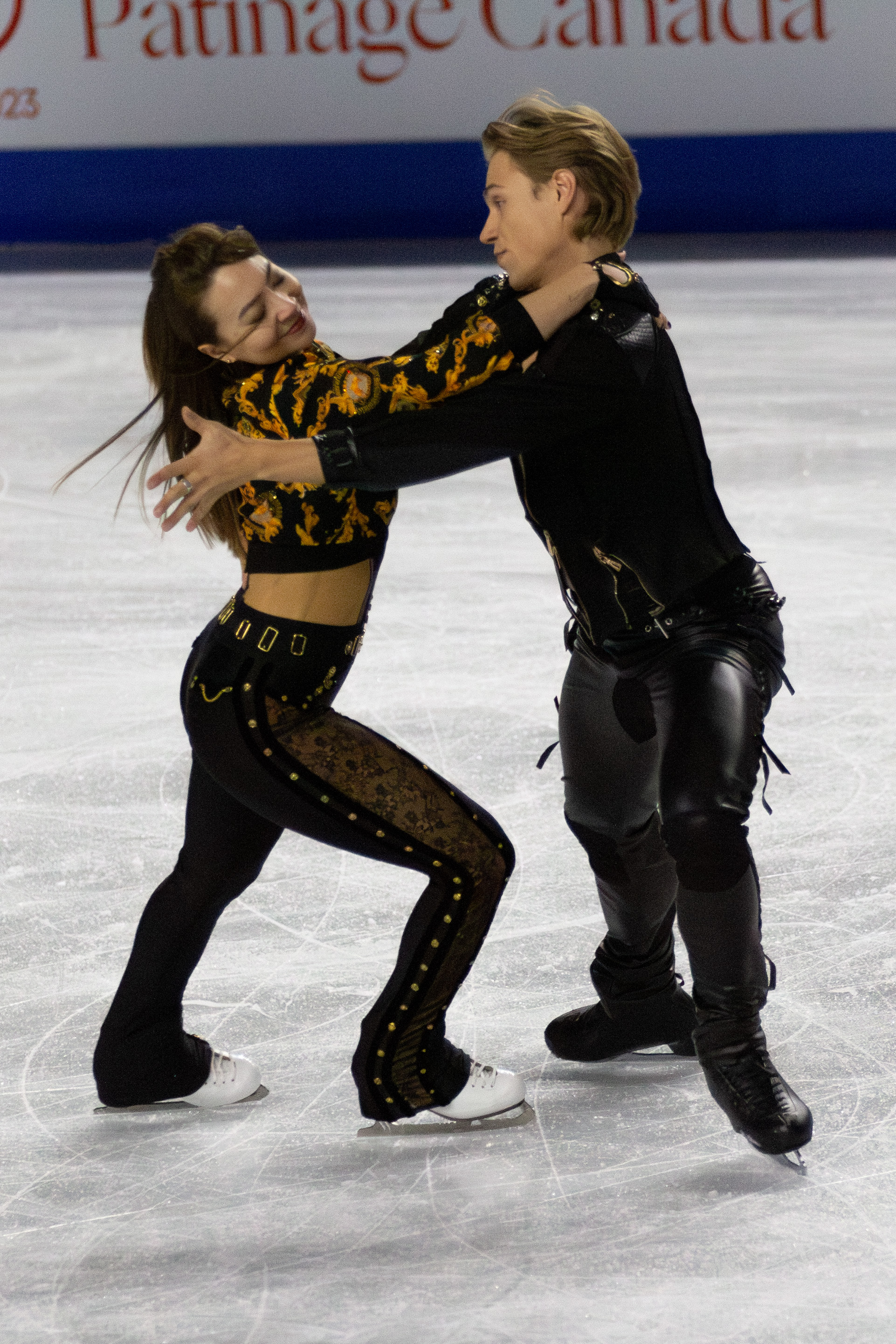
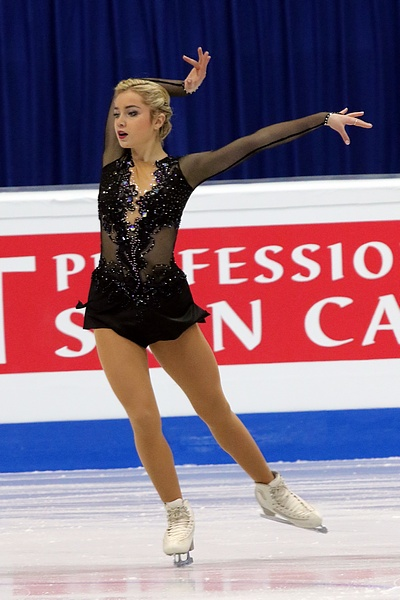
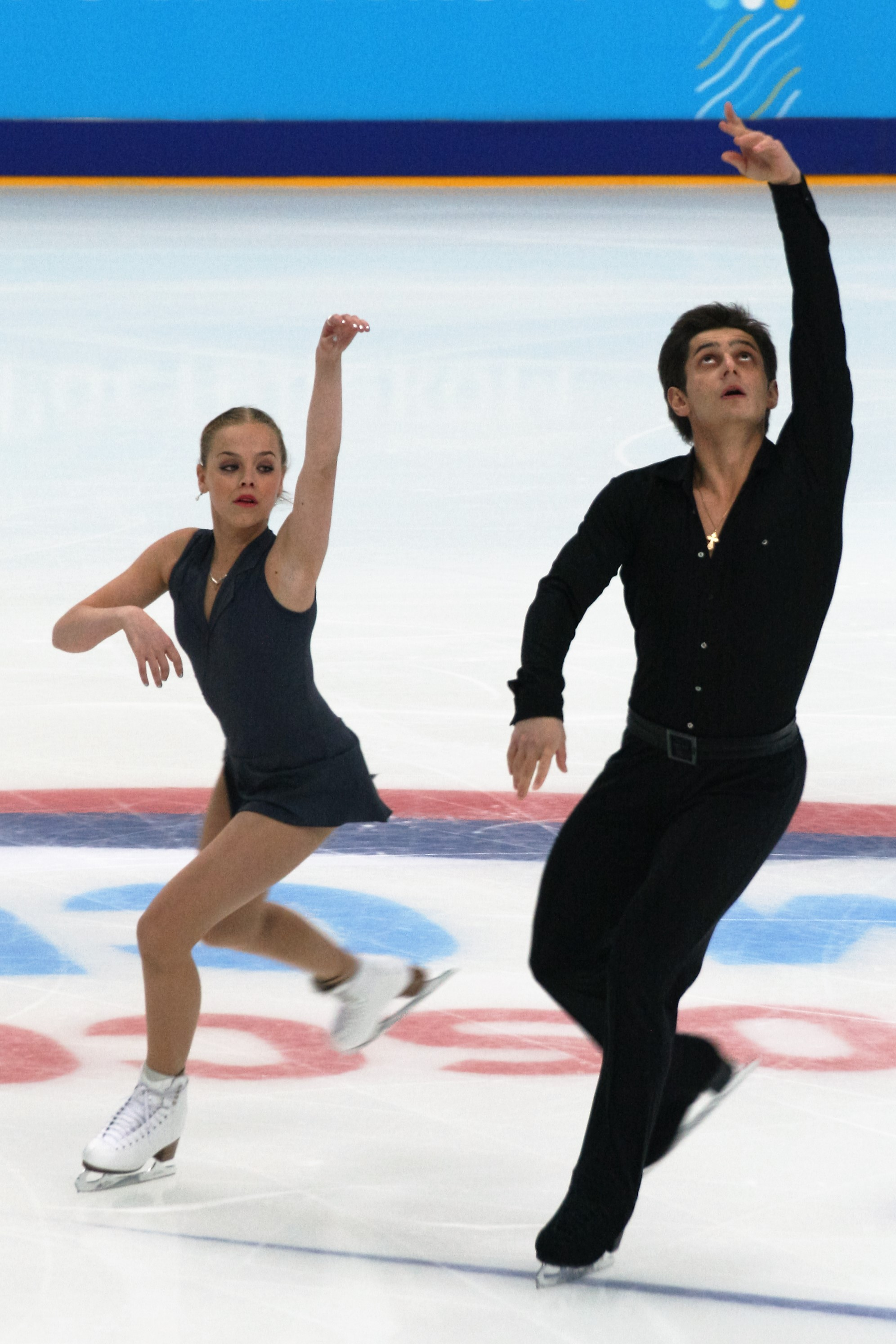
From left to right: Allison Reed and Saulius Ambrulevičius, seven-time Lithuanian champions in ice dance; Aleksandra Dolinskė, six-time Lithuanian champion in women's singles; and Goda Butkutė and Nikita Ermolaev, six-time Lithuanian champions in pair skating

=== Men's singles ===
Senior men's event medalists
Year	Location	Gold	Silver	Bronze	Ref.
1992	Competition cancelled				
1993	Kaunas	Marius Joneliūnas	(No records found)		
1994	Kaunas	Andrejs Vlaščenko (Latvia) (Note: There was no 1994 Lithuanian champion in the men's event, because all of the competitors were guest skaters. Vaidotas Juraitis was the only Lithuanian skater to enter the competition, but he withdrew after the first day due to injury.)	Marek Sząszor (Poland)	Vitalijus Lysenko (Belarus)	
1995	Kaunas	Vaidotas Juraitis	Aidas Reklys	Vladislova Rudkevičius	
1996	Kaunas	Evgenijus Kapitulecas (Belarus) (Note: Vaidotas Juraitis was named the 1996 Lithuanian champion, because Evgenijus Kapitulecas, the first-place finisher, was a guest skater from Belarus.)	Vaidotas Juraitis	Aidas Reklys	
1997					
1998					
1999					
2000		Aidas Reklys		Tomas Katukevičius	
2001		Tomas Katukevičius	Aidas Reklys		
2002		Aidas Reklys			
2003		Aidas Reklys	Tomas Katukevičius	Aleksandras Pirogovas	
2004		Aidas Reklys	Tomas Katukevičius	Aleksandras Pirogovas	
2005		Aidas Reklys	Tomas Katukevičius	Mikolas Judele	
2006		Aidas Reklys	Tomas Katukevičius	Aleksandras Pirogovas	
2007		Saulius Ambrulevičius	Aleksandras Pirogovas	Viktor Silov	
2008		Saulius Ambrulevičius	Viktor Silov	Simonas Germanavicius	
2009	Kaunas	Saulius Ambrulevičius	Viktor Silov	Simonas Germanavicius	
2010	(Latvia) Riga	Saulius Ambrulevičius	Girts Jekabsons (Latvia)	No other competitors	
2011		Saulius Ambrulevičius	Artūras Ganžela	Deividas Kizala	
2012		Saulius Ambrulevičius	Artūras Ganžela	No other competitors	
2013	Kaunas	Saulius Ambrulevičius	No other competitors		
2014–15	Kaunas	No men's competitors			
2016	Kaunas	Artūras Ganžėla	No other competitors		
2017	(Latvia) Ventspils	Deniss Vasiļjevs (Latvia) (Note: There was no 2017 Lithuanian champion in the men's event, because both of the competitors were from Latvia.)	Gļebs Basins (Latvia)	No other competitors	
2018	Kaunas	No men's competitors			
2019	Elektrėnai	Alexander Lebedev (Belarus) (Note: There was no 2019 Lithuanian champion in the men's event, because Alexander Lebedev, the only competitor, was a guest skater from Belarus.)	No other competitors		
2020–23	No men's competitors				
2024	Kaunas	Daniel Korabelnik	Daniel Kockers	No other competitors	
2025	Kaunas	Daniel Korabelnik	No other competitors		
2026	Kaunas	Daniel Korabelnik	No other competitors		

=== Women's singles ===
Senior women's event medalists
Year	Location	Gold	Silver	Bronze	Ref.
1992	Competition cancelled				
1993	Kaunas	Laurynė Slavinskaitė	(No records found)		
1994	Kaunas	Ingrida Zenkevičiūtė	Natalija Sapiolkina (Belarus)	Laurynė Slavinskaitė	
1995	Kaunas	Ingrida Zenkevičiūtė	N. Vusovska (Latvia)	Laurynė Slavinskaitė	
1996	Kaunas	Laurynė Slavinskaitė	Ingrida Zenkevičiūtė	Inesa Jurevičiūtė	
1997					
1998					
1999		Ingrida Zenkevičiūtė			
2000		Inesa Jurevičiūtė			
2001		Gintarė Vostrecovaitė	Julija Selepen	Inesa Jurevičiūtė	
2002		Gintarė Vostrecovaitė	Julija Selepen		
2003		Gintarė Vostrecovaitė	Rūta Gajauskaitė	Diana Rybalko	
2004		Gintarė Vostrecovaitė	Rūta Gajauskaitė	Diana Rybalko	
2005		Gintarė Vostrecovaitė	Rūta Gajauskaitė	Diana Rybalko	
2006		Rūta Gajauskaitė	Laura Iaknaviciutė	Aida Rybalko	
2007		Beatričė Rožinskaitė	Aida Rybalko	Marina Simonova	
2008		Beatričė Rožinskaitė	Aida Rybalko	Marina Simonova	
2009	Kaunas	Beatričė Rožinskaitė	Rimgaile Meskaitė	Kotryna Karaliutė	
2010	(Latvia) Riga	Žanna Pugača (Latvia) (Note: Beatričė Rožinskaitė was named the 2010 Lithuanian champion, because Žanna Pugača, the first-place finisher, was from Latvia.)	Beatričė Rožinskaitė	Aida Rybalko	
2011		Rimgaile Meskaitė	Inga Janulevičiūtė	Aida Rybalko	
2012		Aleksandra Golovkina	Inga Janulevičiūtė	Rimgaile Meskaitė	
2013	Kaunas	Aleksandra Golovkina	Inga Janulevičiūtė	Julija Kravčenko	
2014	Kaunas	Inga Janulevičiūtė	Aleksandra Golovkina	Beatričė Meilūnaitė	
2015	Kaunas	Inga Janulevičiūtė	Viltė Radzvilavičiūtė	No other competitors	
2016	Kaunas	Aleksandra Golovkina	Inga Janulevičiūtė	Viltė Radzvilavičiūtė	
2017	(Latvia) Ventspils	Angelīna Kučvaļska (Latvia) (Note: Elžbieta Kropa was named the 2017 Lithuanian champion, because Angelīna Kučvaļska, the first-place finisher, was from Latvia.)	Elžbieta Kropa	Deimantė Kizalaitė	
2018	Kaunas	Greta Morkytė	No other competitors		
2019	Elektrėnai	Paulina Ramanauskaitė	Elžbieta Kropa	Greta Morkytė	
2020	Kaunas	Aleksandra Golovkina	Elžbieta Kropa	Greta Morkytė	
2021	Elektrėnai	Elžbieta Kropa	No other competitors		
2022	Kaunas	Aleksandra Golovkina	Selina Kaneda	Sharlotė Jekabsonė (Latvia)	
2023	Kaunas	Aleksandra Golovkina	Daria Afinogenova	Jogailė Aglinskytė	
2024	Kaunas	Meda Variakojytė	Aleksandra Golovkina	Jogailė Aglinskytė	
2025	Kaunas	Meda Variakojytė	Jogailė Aglinskytė	No other competitors	
2026	Kaunas	Meda Variakojytė	Jogailė Aglinskytė	No other competitors	

=== Pairs ===
Senior pairs event medalists
Year	Location	Gold	Silver	Bronze	Ref.
No pairs competitors prior to 2013
2013	Kaunas	Goda Butkutė; Nikita Ermolaev	No other competitors		
2014	Kaunas	Goda Butkutė; Nikita Ermolaev	No other competitors		
2015	Kaunas	No pairs competitors			
2016	Kaunas	Goda Butkutė; Nikita Ermolaev	No other competitors		
2017	Kaunas	Goda Butkutė; Nikita Ermolaev	No other competitors		
2018	Kaunas	Goda Butkutė; Nikita Ermolaev	No other competitors		
No pairs competitors since 2018

=== Ice dance ===
In August 2022, Gitanas Nausėda, President of Lithuania, stripped Margarita Drobiazko and Povilas Vanagas of their Order of the Lithuanian Grand Duke Gediminas – an award bestowed upon Lithuanian citizens and foreign nationals for outstanding civil and public service – after Drobiasko and Vanagas participated in an event in Russia organized by Tatiana Navka, retired ice dancer and wife of Kremlin spokesperson Dmitry Peskov. Nausėda stripped Drobiazko of her Lithuanian citizenship in September 2023, citing a law which allows such revocation "if the person publicly expresses support for a state that poses a threat to Lithuania or its allies' security interests." Nausėda referred to Lithuania having granted Drobiasko citizenship as a "miserable farce under the current circumstances."

Senior ice dance event medalists
Year	Location	Gold	Silver	Bronze	Ref.
1992	Competition cancelled				
1993	Kaunas	Margarita Drobiazko; Povilas Vanagas	(No records found)		
1994	Kaunas	Margarita Drobiazko; Povilas Vanagas	(Latvia); Anastasija Gribonkina; Erikas Samovičius; (Latvia)	No other competitors	
1995	Kaunas	No ice dance competitions			
1996	Kaunas	No ice dance competitions			
1997		Margarita Drobiazko; Povilas Vanagas			
1998		Margarita Drobiazko; Povilas Vanagas	Inesa Jurevičiūtė; Marius Janeliauskas		
1999		Margarita Drobiazko; Povilas Vanagas			
2000		Margarita Drobiazko; Povilas Vanagas	Elena Egorova; Aurimas Radisauskas		
2001		Margarita Drobiazko; Povilas Vanagas	Dominyka Valiukeviciute; Aurimas Radisauskas	No other competitors	
2002		Margarita Drobiazko; Povilas Vanagas	No other competitors		
2003		Clover Zatzman; Aurimas Radisauskas	No other competitors		
2004		Clover Zatzman; Aurimas Radisauskas	Kayla Nicole Frey; Deividas Stagniūnas	No other competitors	
2005		Margarita Drobiazko; Povilas Vanagas	Kayla Nicole Frey; Deividas Stagniūnas	No other competitors	
2006		Margarita Drobiazko; Povilas Vanagas	Kayla Nicole Frey; Deividas Stagniūnas	Clover Zatzman; Aurimas Radisauskas	
2007		Katherine Copely; Deividas Stagniūnas	Nicolette House; Aidas Reklys	Clover Zatzman; Aurimas Radisauskas	
2008		Katherine Copely; Deividas Stagniūnas	Nicolette House; Aidas Reklys	No other competitors	
2009		Katherine Copely; Deividas Stagniūnas	Alissandra Aronow; Aleksandr Pirogov	No other competitors	
2010		Katherine Copely; Deividas Stagniūnas	Tautvyde Mockute; Gediminas Barkauskas	No other competitors	
2011		Isabella Tobias; Deividas Stagniūnas	Teresaa Vellrath; Aleksandr Pirogov	Ilona Birgelaitė; Aivaras Starvinskas	
2012		Isabella Tobias; Deividas Stagniūnas	Ilona Birgelaitė; Aivaras Starvinskas	No other competitors	
2013–15	Kaunas	No ice dance competitors			
2016	Kaunas	Taylor Tran; Saulius Ambrulevičius	No other competitors		
2017	Kaunas	Taylor Tran; Saulius Ambrulevičius	No other competitors		
2018	Kaunas	Allison Reed; Saulius Ambrulevičius	Guostė Damulevičiūtė; Deividas Kizala	No other competitors	
2019	Elektrėnai	Allison Reed; Saulius Ambrulevičius	No other competitors		
2020	Kaunas	Allison Reed; Saulius Ambrulevičius	No other competitors		
2021	Elektrėnai	Allison Reed; Saulius Ambrulevičius	Paulina Ramanauskaitė; Deividas Kizala	No other competitors	
2022	Kaunas	Allison Reed; Saulius Ambrulevičius	Paulina Ramanauskaitė; Deividas Kizala	No other competitors	
2023	Kaunas	Allison Reed; Saulius Ambrulevičius	Paulina Ramanauskaitė; Deividas Kizala	No other competitors	
2024	Kaunas	No ice dance competitors			
2025	Kaunas	Allison Reed; Saulius Ambrulevičius	Paulina Ramanauskaitė; Deividas Kizala	No other competitors	
2026	Kaunas	No ice dance competitors			

== Junior medalists ==
=== Men's singles ===
Junior men's event medalists
Year	Location	Gold	Silver	Bronze	Ref.
2013	Kaunas	Deividas Kizala	Laurynas Vonžodas	Edvinas Apitionok	
2014	Kaunas	Laurynas Vonžodas	Tadas Jakūbauskas	Edvinas Apitionok	
2015	Kaunas	Laurynas Vonžodas	Artūras Ganžela	Edvinas Apitionok	
2016	Kaunas	No junior men's competitors			
2017	(Latvia) Ventspils	Daniels Roschiks (Latvia) (Note: Aleksandras Chitrenko was named the 2017 Lithuanian junior champion, because Daniels Roschiks, the first-place finisher, was from Latvia.)	Aleksandras Chitrenko	No other competitors	
2018–19	No junior men's competitors				
2020	Kaunas	Andrey Mikhalchuk (Belarus) (Note: There was no 2020 Lithuanian junior champion in the men's event, because Andrey Mikhalchuk, the only competitor, was a guest skater from Belarus.)	No other competitors		
2021	Elektrėnai	No junior men's competitors			
2022	Kaunas	Daniel Korabelnik	No other competitors		
2023	Kaunas	Daniel Korabelnik	No other competitors		
2024	Kaunas	Luka Imedashvili	No other competitors		
2025	Kaunas	Luka Imedashvili	No other competitors		
2026	Kaunas	Luka Imedashvili	Mantas Gryba	No other competitors	

=== Women's singles ===
Junior women's event medalists
Year	Location	Gold	Silver	Bronze	Ref.
2013	Kaunas	Deimantė Kizalaitė	Ugnė Pečiukaitytė	Guostė Damulevičiūtė	
2014	Kaunas	Deimantė Kizalaitė	Elžbieta Kropa	Dovilė Didžgalvytė	
2015	Kaunas	Deimantė Kizalaitė	Elžbieta Kropa	Kamilė Linauskaitė	
2016	Kaunas	Elžbieta Kropa	Deimantė Kizalaitė	Kamilė Linauskaitė	
2017	(Latvia) Ventspils	Elizabete Jubkāne (Latvia) (Note: Greta Morkytė was named the 2017 junior champion, because Elizabete Jubkāne, the first-place finisher, was from Latvia. Kamilė Linauskaitė finished second and Ieva Mikelionyte finished third among the remaining Lithuanian competitors.)	Greta Morkytė	Darja Šatibelko (Latvia)	
2018	Kaunas	Paulina Ramanauskaitė	Dominyka Molevičiūtė	Dovilė Didžgalvytė	
2019	Elektrėnai	Polina Andrejeva (Latvia) (Note: Selina Kaneda was named the 2019 Lithuanian junior champion, because Polina Andrejeva, the first-place finisher, was a guest skater from Latvia.)	Selina Kaneda	Dominyka Molevičiūtė	
2020	Kaunas	Jogailė Aglinskytė	Selina Kaneda	Sharlote Jekabsone (Latvia)	
2021	Elektrėnai	Jogailė Aglinskytė	Marija Brejeva	Darja Reginevič	
2022	Kaunas	Daria Afinogenova	Meda Variakojytė	(Georgia (country)) Anna Dea Gulbiani Schmidt (Georgia)	
2023	Kaunas	Meda Variakojytė	Darija Reginėvič	Jalizaveta Kovalova	
2024	Kaunas	Gabriele Juskaitė	Agne Ivanovaitė	Gabija Pociutė	
2025	Kaunas	Gabriele Juskaitė	Milana Siniavskytė	Ema Komiciutė	
2026	Kaunas	Milana Siniavskytė	Evelina Stavickytė	Agne Ivanovaitė	

=== Ice dance ===
Year	Location	Gold	Silver	Bronze	Ref.
2013–15	Kaunas	No junior ice dance competitors			
2016	Kaunas	Guostė Damulevičiūtė; Deividas Kizala	Jogailė Žilionytė; Luca Morini	No other competitors	
2017	Kaunas	Guostė Damulevičiūtė; Deividas Kizala	No other competitors		
2018	Kaunas	Swantje Brandt; Edvinas Apitionok	No other competitors		
2019	Elektrėnai	Mira Polishook; Deividas Kizala	No other competitors		
No junior ice dance competitors since 2019

== Records ==
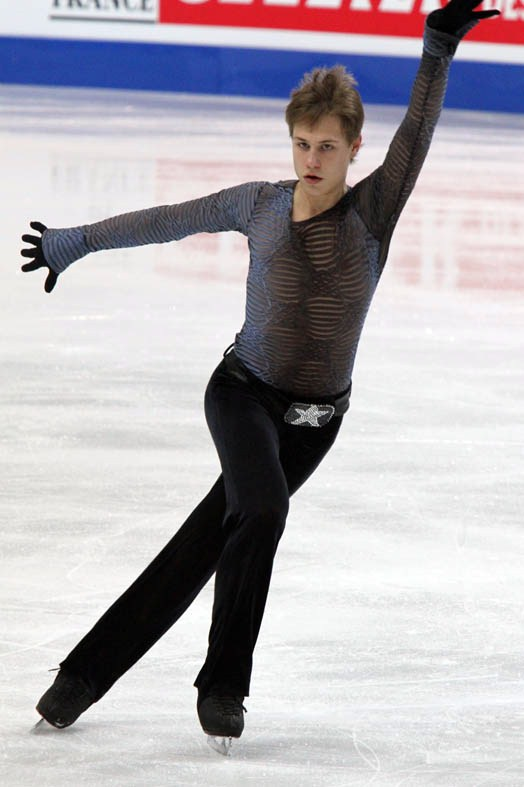
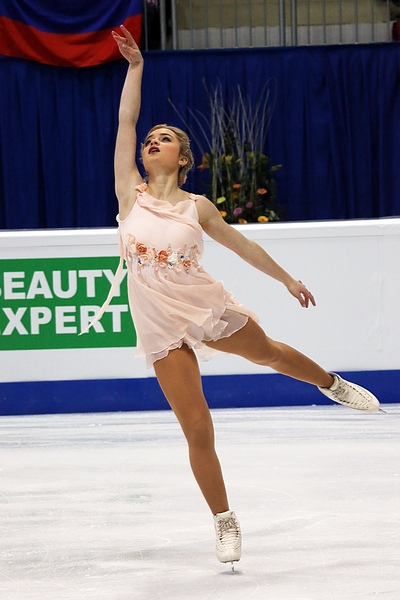
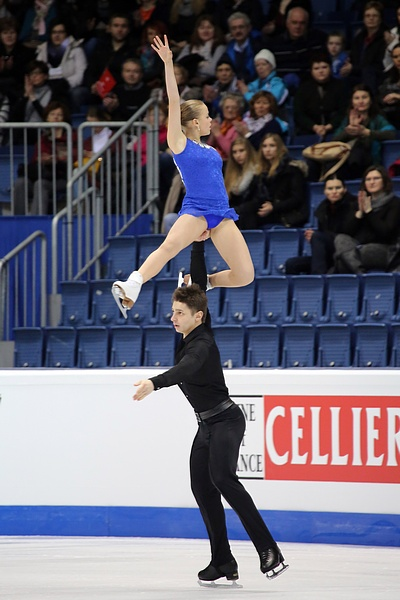
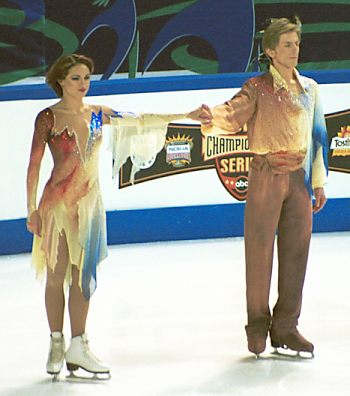
From left to right: Saulius Ambrulevičius won seven Lithuanian Championship titles in men's singles before he switched to ice dance; Aleksandra Golovkina-Dolinskė won six Lithuanian Championship titles in women's singles; Goda Butkutė and Nikita Ermolaev won five Lithuanian Championship titles in pair skating; and Margarita Drobiazko and Povilas Vanagas won twelve Lithuanian Championship titles in ice dance.

Records
Discipline	Most championship titles			
Discipline	Skater(s)	No.	Years	Ref.
Men's singles	Saulius Ambrulevičius	7	2007–13	
Women's singles	Aleksandra Golovkina-Dolinskė	6	2012–13; 2016; 2020; 2022–24	
Pairs	Goda Butkutė; Nikita Ermolaev	5	2013–14; 2016–18	
Ice dance	Margarita Drobiazko; Povilas Vanagas	12	1993–2002; 2005–06	
