= Elžbieta Kropa =

Lithuanian figure skater

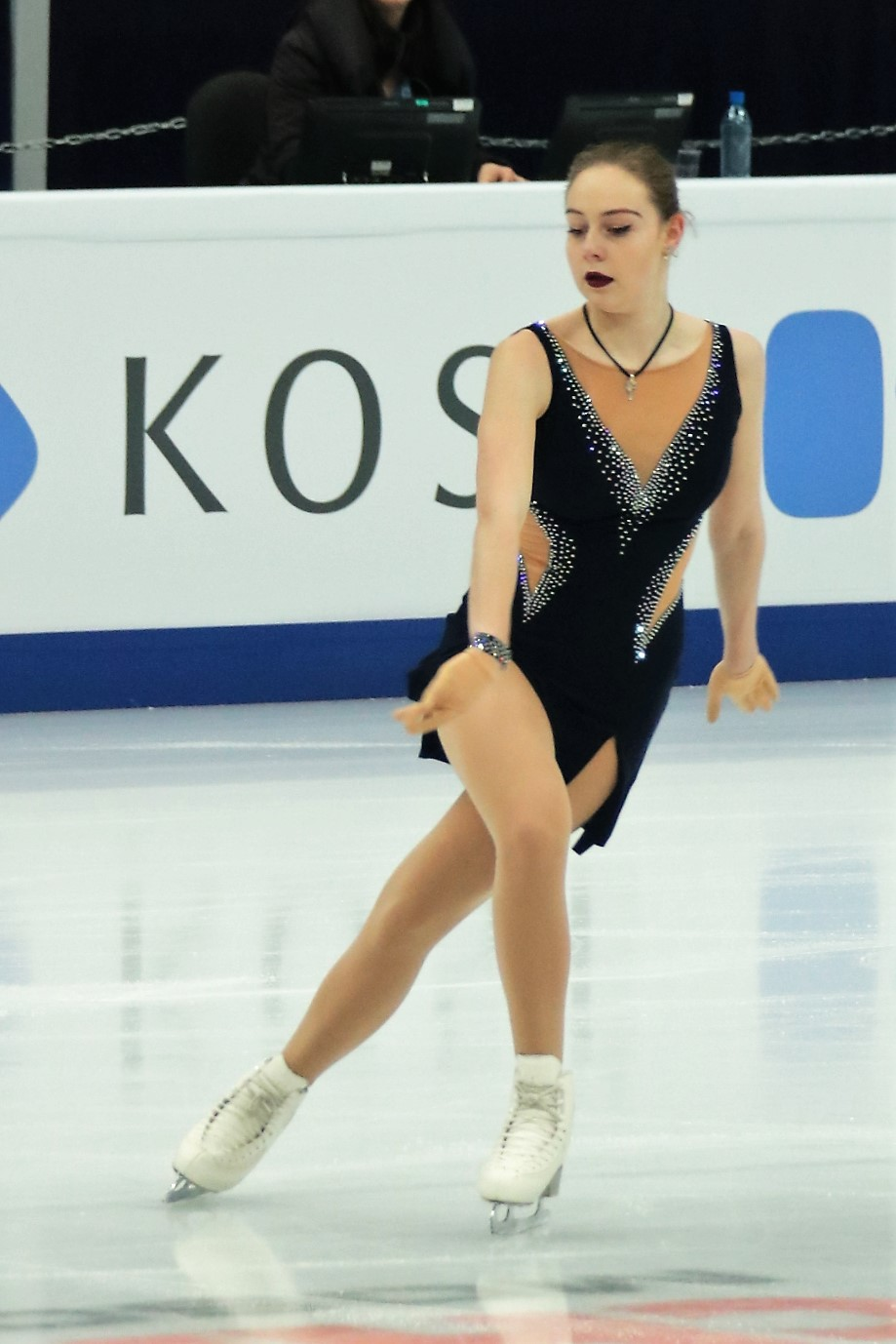
- Kropa at the 2018 European Championships

Personal information
- Born: 31 March 1999 (age 27) Vilnius, Lithuania
- Height: 1.73 m (5 ft 8 in)

Figure skating career
- Country: Lithuania
- Coach: Dmitrij Kozlov, Evgeni Rukavicin
- Skating club: Baltų Ainiai Kaunas
- Began skating: 2003

Elžbieta Kropa (born 31 March 1999) is a Lithuanian figure skater. She is the 2017 Kaunas Ice Autumn Cup champion and a two-time Lithuanian national champion. She qualified for the final segment at the 2018 European Championships in Moscow, Russia, and finished 22nd overall. She also represented Lithuania at three World Championships.

== Career ==
Kropa made her Junior Grand Prix (JGP) debut at the 2015 JGP Slovakia and finished 18th. She then won the junior title at the 2016 Lithuanian Championships. She finished 41st in the short program at the 2016 World Junior Championships.

Kropa finished 13th at the 2016 JGP Czech Republic and performed a triple-triple combination for the first time. She also finished 13th in the senior level Cup of Nice. She then won the senior title at the 2017 Lithuanian Championships. At the 2017 European Championships, she finished 28th in the short program and did not advance to the free skate. She then finished 38th in the short program at the 2017 World Junior Championships.

At the 2018 European Championships, Kropa advanced to the free skate and finished 22nd overall. She achieved personal bests in the free skate and in the combined total, and she met the minimum technical elements score requirement to compete at the 2018 World Championships. There, she finished 31st in the short program and did not advance to the free skate.

Kropa finished fourth at the 2019 Tallink Hotels Cup, and she met the minimum technical elements score to compete at the 2019 World Championships. There, she set a new personal best score in the short program but still did not advance to the free skate, finishing 38th.

Kropa finished second to Aleksandra Golovkina at the 2020 Lithuanian Championships. She then won a bronze medal at the 2020 Skate Helena.

Kropa finished 37th in the short program at the 2021 World Championships.

== Programs ==
Season	Short program	Free skating
2020–2021	Feeling Good performed by Avicii	Rain, In Your Black Eyes by Ezio Bosso
2017–2018	I Put a Spell on You performed by Annie Lennox	The Winter by Balmorhea
2016–2017	I Put a Spell on You performed by Annie Lennox	Burlesque
2015–2016	Tango de los Exilados by Vanessa-Mae, Walter Taieb	Burlesque
2014–2015	Tango de los Exilados by Vanessa-Mae, Walter Taieb	Beyond Rangoon; Waters of Irrawaddy by Hans Zimmer performed by Maksim Mrvica

== Competitive highlights ==
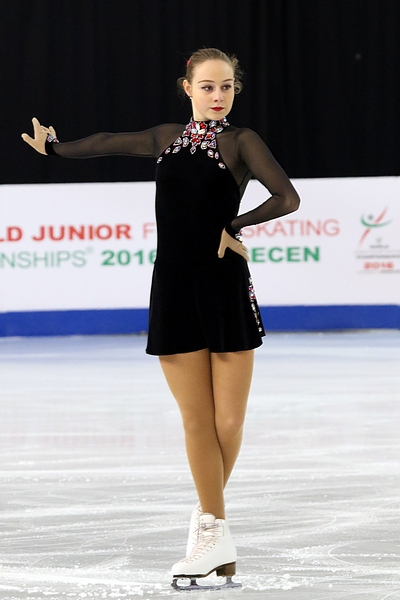
Kropa competing at the 2016 World Junior Championships

CS: Challenger Series; JGP: Junior Grand Prix

International
Event	13–14	14–15	15–16	16–17	17–18	18–19	19–20	20–21	21–22
Worlds					31st	38th		37th	
Europeans				28th	22nd				
CS Alpen Trophy						WD			
CS Budapest								WD	
CS Golden Spin						WD			
CS Ice Star					10th		21st		
CS Lombardia						15th	WD		
CS Ondrej Nepela				16th					
CS Tallinn Trophy			20th						
CS Warsaw Cup							WD		
Challenge Cup				13th	18th		16th		
Cup of Nice				13th					
Dragon Trophy							11th		
Hellmut Seibt		14th							
Kaunas Autumn					1st				
NRW Trophy									6th
Skate Helena							3rd		
Tallinn Trophy							18th		
Tallink Hotels Cup						4th	7th	11th	
Toruń Cup				13th		11th	WD		
Universiade						16th			
International: Junior
Junior Worlds			41st	38th					
JGP Czech Rep.				13th					
JGP Poland			22nd						
JGP Slovakia			18th						
Hellmut Seibt	3rd		1st						
Ice Star		6th							
NRW Trophy	11th								
RU Crystal Skate		5th							
Tallinn Trophy		10th							
Toruń Cup	5th	10th	5th						
Volvo Open Cup		19th							
Warsaw Cup	8th								
National
Lithuania	2nd J	2nd J	1st J	1st	2nd	2nd	2nd	1st	
J = Junior level
