= 2015 CS Mordovian Ornament =

2015 Mordovian Ornament
- Type: ISU Challenger Series
- Date: October 15 – 18
- Season: 2015–16
- Location: Saransk, Mordovia, Russia
- Venue: Palace of Sports of the city Saransk

Champions
- Men's singles: (Russia) Maxim Kovtun
- Ladies' singles: (Russia) Anna Pogorilaya
- Pairs: (Russia) Yuko Kavaguti / Alexander Smirnov
- Ice dance: (Russia) Elena Ilinykh / Ruslan Zhiganshin

The 2015 Mordovian Ornament was a senior international figure skating competition in the 2015–16 season. A part of the 2015–16 ISU Challenger Series, the 1st edition of the annual event were held on 15–18 October 2015 at the Palace of Sports in Saransk, Russia. Medals were awarded in men's singles, ladies' singles, pair skating, and ice dance.

== Entries ==
The preliminary entries were published on 25 September 2015.

Country	Men	Ladies	Pairs	Ice dance
Armenia	Slavik Hayrapetyan	Anastasia Galustyan		
Belarus	Pavel Ignatenko		Tatiana Danilova / Mikalai Kamianchuk; Maria Paliakova / Nikita Bochkov	Viktoria Kavaliova / Yurii Bieliaiev
Germany				Aurelia Ippolito / Bennet Preiss; Katharina Müller / Tim Dieck
Hungary		Fruzsina Medgyesi		
Israel	Daniel Samohin	Katarina Kulgeyko	Adel Tankova / Evgeni Krasnopolski	Kimberly Berkovich / Ronald Zilberberg; Isabella Tobias / Ilia Tkachenko
Kazakhstan	Artur Panikhin	Aiza Mambekova		Anastasia Khromova / Daryn Zhunussov
Latvia	Deniss Vasiļjevs			Olga Jakushina / Andrey Nevskiy
Lithuania		Aleksandra Golovkina	Goda Butkute / Nikita Ermolaev	
Poland				Natalia Kaliszek / Maksim Spodirev
Russia	Maxim Kovtun; Moris Kvitelashvili; Alexander Samarin	Maria Artemieva; Anna Pogorilaya; Adelina Sotnikova	Arina Cherniavskaia / Antonio Souza-Kordeyru; Yuko Kavaguti / Alexander Smirnov; Natalja Zabijako / Alexander Enbert	Ekaterina Bobrova / Dmitri Soloviev; Elena Ilinykh / Ruslan Zhiganshin; Ludmila Sosnitskaia / Pavel Golovishnokov
Slovenia		Daša Grm		
South Korea				Rebeka Kim / Kirill Minov
Sweden	Marcus Björk			
Turkey				Alisa Agafonova / Alper Uçar

== Results ==
=== Men ===
Rank	Name	Nation	Total	SP		FS	
1	Maxim Kovtun	Russia	236.38	4	73.14	1	163.24
2	Daniel Samohin	Israel	235.14	1	79.66	2	155.48
3	Moris Kvitelashvili	Russia	230.24	3	75.79	3	154.45
4	Alexander Samarin	Russia	222.45	2	78.70	4	143.75
5	Deniss Vasiļjevs	Latvia	205.13	5	72.72	5	132.41
6	Pavel Ignatenko	Belarus	185.80	6	60.03	6	125.77
7	Slavik Hayrapetyan	Armenia	164.03	7	49.44	7	114.59
8	Artur Panikhin	Kazakhstan	119.83	8	41.76	8	78.07
WD	Marcus Björk	Sweden	withdrew	9	39.59	withdrew from competition	

=== Ladies ===
Rank	Name	Nation	Total	SP		FS	
1	Anna Pogorilaya	Russia	214.07	2	72.26	1	141.81
2	Adelina Sotnikova	Russia	203.89	1	75.57	2	128.32
3	Maria Artemieva	Russia	173.87	3	57.81	3	116.06
4	Anastasia Galustyan	Armenia	151.84	4	50.23	4	101.61
5	Aleksandra Golovkina	Lithuania	144.76	5	48.95	5	95.81
6	Daša Grm	Slovenia	128.27	7	45.01	6	83.26
7	Katarina Kulgeyko	Israel	117.52	6	45.02	8	72.50
8	Aiza Mambekova	Kazakhstan	108.75	9	33.93	7	74.82
9	Fruzsina Medgyesi	Hungary	106.89	8	44.36	9	62.53

=== Pairs ===
Rank	Name	Nation	Total	SP		FS	
1	Yuko Kavaguti / Alexander Smirnov	Russia	214.05	1	76.02	1	138.03
2	Natalja Zabijako / Alexander Enbert	Russia	196.22	2	67.64	2	128.58
3	Goda Butkute / Nikita Ermolaev	Lithuania	141.80	6	40.26	3	101.54
4	Arina Cherniavskaia / Antonio Souza-Kordeyru	Russia	141.54	4	48.58	4	92.96
5	Tatiana Danilova / Mikalai Kamianchuk	Belarus	141.24	3	49.52	5	91.72
6	Maria Paliakova / Nikita Bochkov	Belarus	128.50	7	39.92	6	88.58
7	Adel Tankova / Evgeni Krasnopolski	Israel	119.00	5	40.54	7	78.46

=== Ice dancing ===
Rank	Name	Nation	Total	SP		FS	
1	Elena Ilinykh / Ruslan Zhiganshin	Russia	176.70	1	70.12	1	106.58
2	Isabella Tobias / Ilia Tkachenko	Israel	160.98	2	65.28	2	95.70
3	Natalia Kaliszek / Maksim Spodirev	Poland	150.60	3	59.44	3	91.16
4	Alisa Agafonova / Alper Uçar	Turkey	145.34	5	56.76	4	88.58
5	Viktoria Kavaliova / Yurii Bieliaiev	Belarus	142.86	4	57.48	6	85.38
6	Rebeka Kim / Kirill Minov	South Korea	137.28	7	51.26	5	86.02
7	Ludmila Sosnitskaia / Pavel Golovishnikov	Russia	134.18	6	53.16	7	81.02
8	Katharina Müller / Tim Dieck	Germany	119.10	8	46.86	8	72.24
9	Anastasia Khromova / Daryn Zhunussov	Kazakhstan	114.20	9	45.92	9	68.28
10	Kimberly Berkovich / Ronald Zilberberg	Israel	106.02	10	42.06	10	63.96
11	Olga Jakushina / Andrey Nevskiy	Latvia	104.40	11	41.38	11	63.02
12	Aurelia Ippolito / Bennet Preiss	Germany	90.42	12	32.36	12	58.06
WD	Ekaterina Bobrova / Dmitri Soloviev	Russia	withdrew from competition				
