= Rūta Gajauskaitė =

Lithuanian figure skater (born 1989)

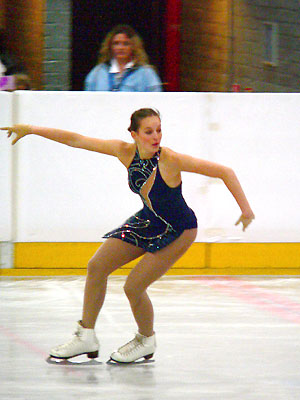
- Gajauskaitė in 2006.

Personal information
- Born: January 22, 1989 (age 37)
- Height: 1.74 m (5 ft 8 1/2 in)

Figure skating career
- Country: Lithuania
- Coach: Lilija Vanagiene
- Skating club: Sports School Baltu Ainiai

Rūta Gajauskaitė (born 22 January 1989 in Kaunas, Lithuania) is a Lithuanian figure skater. She is the 2006 Lithuanian national champion. She is coached by Povilas Vanagas's mother.

== Competitive highlights ==
Event	2002–2003	2003–2004	2004–2005	2005–2006	2006–2007
European Championships				32nd	37th
World Junior Championships		46th	21st QR.	22nd QR.	
Lithuanian Championships	2nd	2nd	2nd	1st	
Junior Grand Prix, Netherlands					26th
Junior Grand Prix, Ukraine			23rd		
Warsaw Cup				10th J.	
European Youth Olympic Days			15th J.		

- J = Junior level; QR = Qualifying Round
