= Greta Morkytė =

Lithuanian figure skater

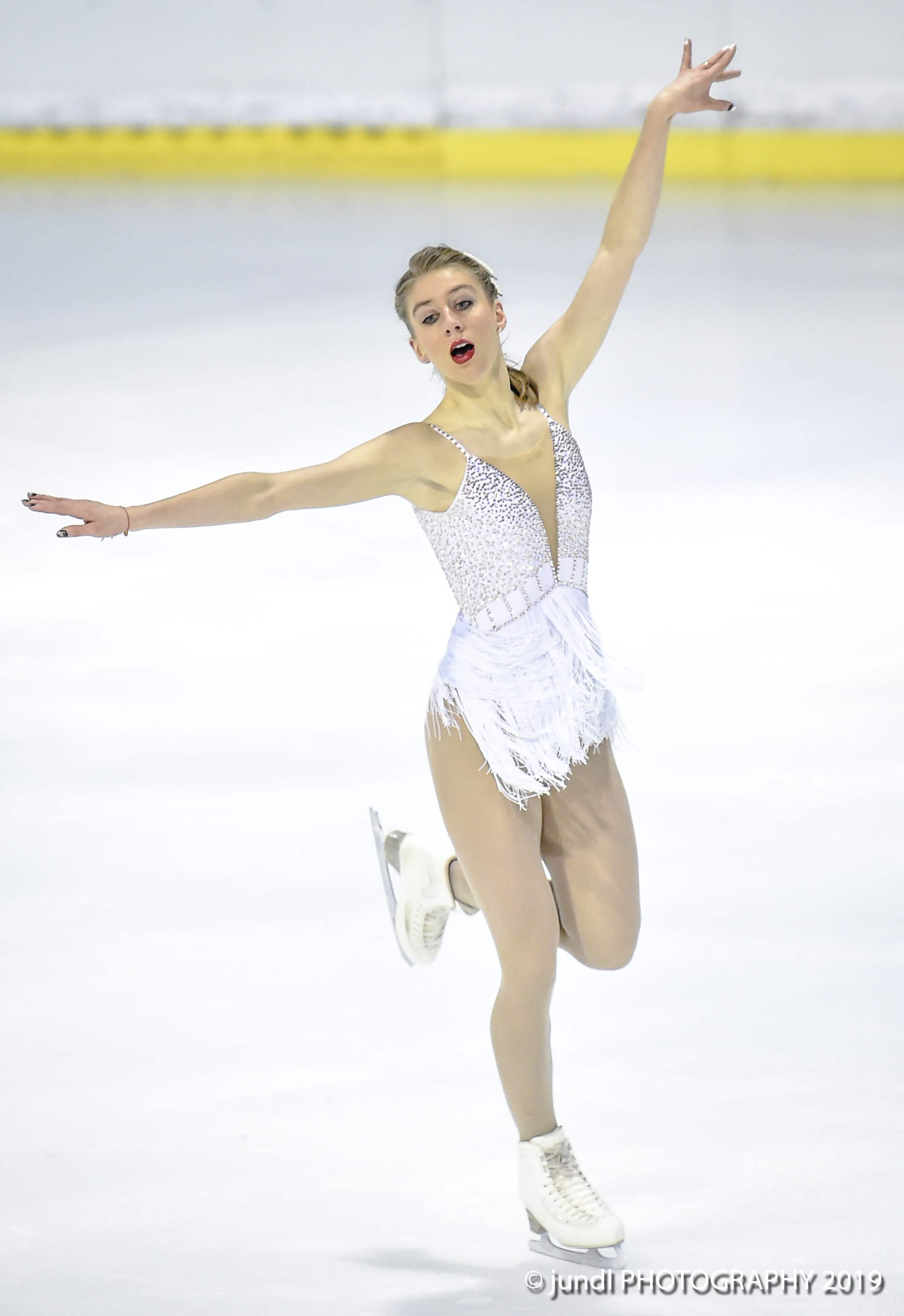
- Morkytė in 2019

Personal information
- Born: 27 March 1999 (age 27) Šiauliai, Lithuania
- Home town: Šiauliai, Lithuania
- Height: 1.66 m (5 ft 5 1/2 in)

Figure skating career
- Country: Lithuania
- Coach: Andrejs Brovenko, Romans Panteljevs
- Skating club: Jelgavas Ice Sport School
- Began skating: 2010

Greta Morkytė (born 27 March 1999) is a Lithuanian figure skater. She is the 2019 Lithuanian national champion and the 2018 Lithuanian national bronze medalist.

== Results ==
International
Event	14–15	15–16	16–17	17–18	18–19	19–20	20–21
Europeans				WD			
CS Alpen Trophy					12th		
CS Ice Star				13th			
CS Lombardia Trophy				33rd	19th	13th	
CS Nebelhorn							17th
CS Warsaw Cup				11th		WD	C
Bavarian Open						10th	
Dragon Trophy					10th		
EduSport Trophy					5th		
Golden Bear					13th	13th	
Halloween Cup						14th	
Ice Mall Cup					8th		
Ice Star					15th		
NRW Trophy							6th
Open d'Andorra						5th	
Skate Helena						4th	
Sofia Trophy				9th		4th	
Tallinn Trophy						17th	
Volvo Open Cup				8th			
Warsaw Cup					13th		
International: Junior
JGP Estonia				20th			
JGP Latvia			19th				
JGP Russia			15th				
Ice Star		9th					
Kaunas Ice Cup				5th			
Tallinn Trophy	24th	11th	13th				
Toruń Cup		23rd					
Volvo Open Cup			6th				
National
Lithuanian Champ.				1st	3rd		
J = Junior level
