= Aida Rybalko =

Lithuanian figure skater (born 1990)

Personal information
- Full name: Aida Rybalko
- Born: 6 February 1990 (age 36) Kaunas
- Home town: Kaunas
- Height: 1.69 m (5 ft 6 1/2 in)

Figure skating career
- Country: Lithuania
- Skating club: Baltų Ainiai

Aida Rybalko-Laurecke (née Rybalko; born 6 February 1990) is a Lithuanian figure skater. She is a two-time Lithuanian national vice-champion.

== Career ==
Rybalko-Laurecke trained in figure skating alongside her sister Diana while in college. She was coached by Loreta Vitkauskiene and won several junior championships, including the 2002-03 season. She later trained under Egle Kliucakiene for the Lithuanian Figure Skating Championships, where she placed as the runner-up twice, in the 2007-08 and 2009-10 seasons. After retiring from competitive skating, Rybalko-Laurecke worked as a figure skating coach for children.

== Personal life ==
Rybalko-Laurecke married Rokas Laureckis, a member of the band Pikaso, on 24 May 2018, after being in a relationship for five years. Following her marriage, she adopted the surname Rybalko-Laurecke.

== Competitive highlights ==
Event	2003-04	2004-05	2005-06	2006-07	2007-08	2008-09	2009-10	2010-11
Lithuanian Championships		5th	3rd		2nd		2nd	3rd
Winter Universiade								26th
Warsaw Cup						21st J.		
