= Inga Janulevičiūtė =

Lithuanian figure skater (born 1995)

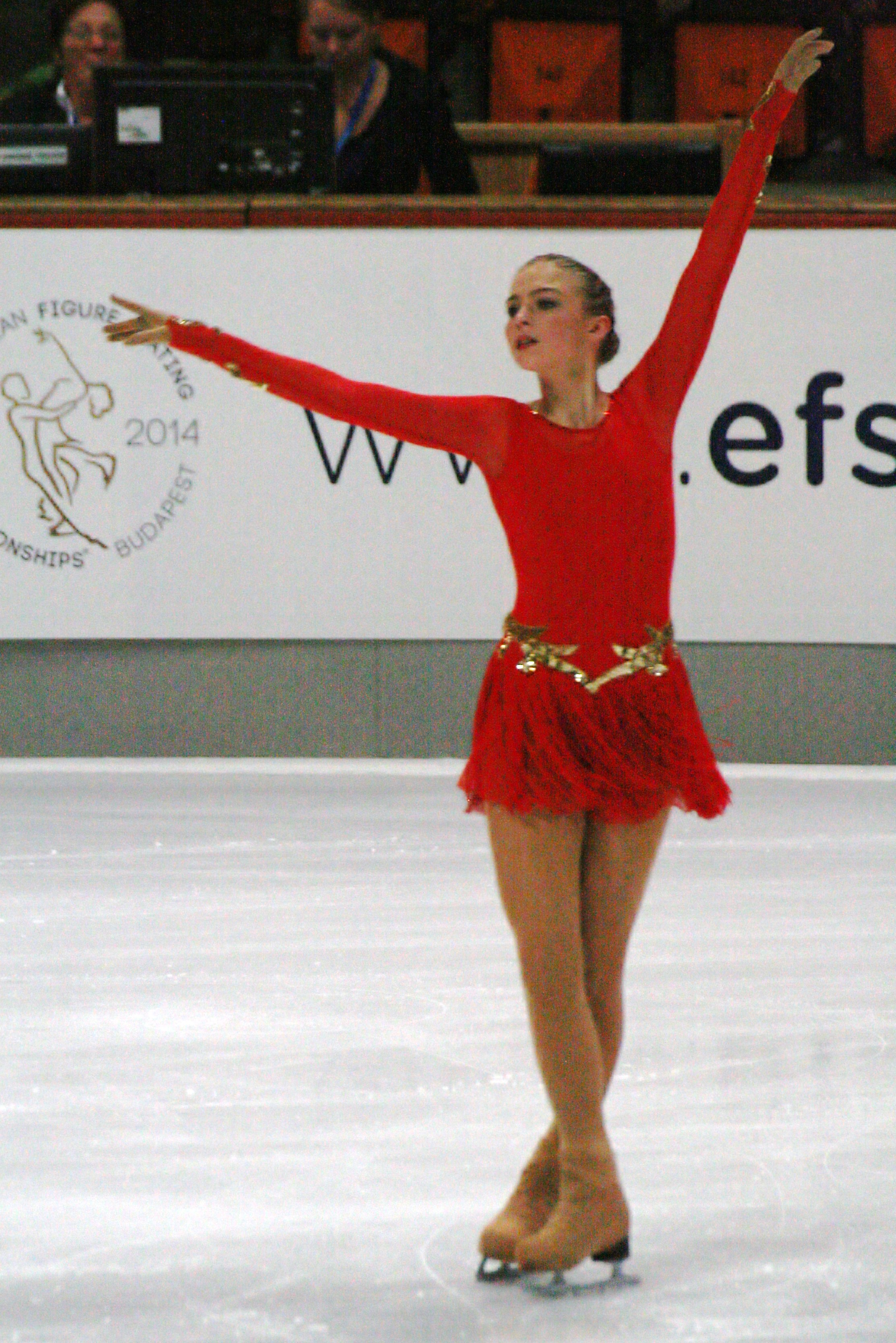
- Janulevičiūtė at the 2013 Nebelhorn Trophy

Personal information
- Born: 16 March 1995 (age 31) Kaunas, Lithuania
- Height: 1.64 m (5 ft 4 1/2 in)

Figure skating career
- Country: Lithuania
- Coach: Dmitri Kozlov
- Skating club: Baltų ainiai
- Began skating: 2002

Inga Janulevičiūtė (born 16 March 1995) is a Lithuanian figure skater. She is the 2014 Lithuanian national champion.

Janulevičiūtė qualified for the free skate at the 2014 European Championships and finished 18th. She was the first alternate for the ladies' event at the 2014 Winter Olympics, having finished 13th at the 2013 Nebelhorn Trophy.

== Programs ==
Season	Short program	Free skating
2015–16	Abraham's Daughter (from The Hunger Games) by Arcade Fire	Autumn Leaves
2012–14	Danse Bacchanale (from Samson and Delilah) by Camille Saint-Saëns	Over the Rainbow (from The Wizard of Oz) by Harold Arlen
2011–12	Nostalgia by Yanni	Thriller by Astor Piazzolla

== Competitive highlights ==
GP: Grand Prix; CS: Challenger Series; JGP: Junior Grand Prix

International
Event	08–09	09–10	10–11	11–12	12–13	13–14	14–15	15–16	16–17
Worlds				16th P	33rd	27th			
Europeans					31st	18th			
CS Ice Challenge								17th	
CS Lombardia							15th		
CS Nepela Trophy							13th		
CS Tallinn Trophy									19th
CS Warsaw Cup							14th		
Golden Spin					13th				
Ice Star							4th		
Lombardia Trophy								9th	
Nebelhorn Trophy						13th			
NRW Trophy					14th	14th		12th	
Printemps								6th	
Seibt Memorial						14th	11th	21st	
Tallinn Trophy							13th		
Universiade							18th		14th
Warsaw Cup					5th	9th			
International: Junior
Junior Worlds				13th P					
JGP Austria					15th				
JGP Estonia				18th					
JGP Latvia						13th			
Cup of Nice					19th J				
NRW Trophy				11th J					
Toruń Cup		2nd J	4th J						
Warsaw Cup	32nd J		13th J	10th J					
National
Lithuanian	4th		2nd	2nd	2nd	1st			3rd
J = Junior level; P = Preliminary round; WD = Withdrew
