= 2024 CS Nepela Memorial =

Figure skating competition

- Type: ISU Challenger Series
- Date: October 24 – 26
- Season: 2024–25
- Location: Bratislava, Slovakia
- Host: Slovak Figure Skating Association
- Venue: Ondrej Nepela Arena

Champions
- Men's singles: (Italy) Daniel Grassl
- Women's singles: (South Korea) Yun Ah-sun
- Ice dance: (United Kingdom) Lilah Fear and Lewis Gibson
- Previous: 2023 CS Nepela Memorial
- Next: 2025 CS Nepela Memorial
- Previous CS: 2024 CS Trophée Métropole Nice Côte d'Azur
- Next CS: 2024 CS Tallinn Trophy

The 2024 CS Nepela Memorial was held on October 24–26, 2024, in Bratislava, Slovakia. It was part of the 2024–25 ISU Challenger Series. Medals were awarded in men's singles, women's singles, and ice dance.

== Entries ==
The International Skating Union published the list of entries on October 3, 2024.

Country	Men	Women	Ice dance
Armenia	Fedor Chitipakhovian	—	
China	—		Lin Yufei; Gao Zijian
China	—		Xiao Zixi; He Linghao
Czech Republic	Georgii Reshtenko	—	
Finland	Arttu Juusola	Linnea Ceder	Juulia Turkkila; Matthias Versluis
France	—		Loïcia Demougeot; Théo le Mercier
Georgia	—		Diana Davis; Gleb Smolkin
Germany	Arthur Wolfgang Mai	Kristina Isaev	Darya Grimm; Michail Savitskiy
Great Britain	Edward Appleby	Nina Povey	Lilah Fear; Lewis Gibson
Great Britain	Ken Fitterer	—	
Hungary	Aleksandr Vlasenko	Regina Schermann	—
Hungary	—	Daria Zsirnov	—
Israel	—	Julia Fennell	Shira Ichilov; Dmytriy Kravchenko
Israel	—	Mariia Seniuk	Mariia Nosovitskaya; Mikhail Nosovitskiy
Italy	Corey Circelli	Lara Naki Gutmann	Victoria Manni; Carlo Röthlisberger
Italy	Daniel Grassl	Sarina Joos	—
Italy	Nikolaj Memola	—	—
Kazakhstan	Dias Jirenbayev	—	
Lithuania	Daniel Korabelnik	Jogaile Aglinskyte	—
Lithuania	—	Meda Variakojyte	—
Netherlands	—	Niki Wories	—
Slovakia	Adam Hagara	Ema Doboszova	Maria Sofia Pucherova; Nikita Lysak
Slovakia	—	Vanesa Šelmeková	Anna Simova; Kirill Aksenov
South Korea	Kim Han-gil	Yun Ah-sun	—
Spain	Tomàs-Llorenç Guarino Sabaté	—	Philomène Sabourin; Raul Bermejo
Spain	Iker Oyarzabal Albas	—	Olivia Smart; Tim Dieck
Sweden	—		Milla Ruud Reitan; Nikolaj Majorov
Switzerland	Georgii Pavlov	Sara Franzi	Arianna Sassi; Luca Morini
Turkey	Başar Oktar	—	
Ukraine	Vadym Novikov	Yelizaveta Babenko	Mariia Pinchuk; Mykyta Pogorielov

=== Changes to preliminary assignments ===
Date	Discipline	Withdrew	Added	Notes	Ref.
October 10	Men	(United Kingdom); Freddie Leggott	(Kazakhstan); Dias Jirenbayev		
October 10	Men	(Hong Kong); Chiu Hei Cheung	(Kazakhstan); Dias Jirenbayev		
October 17	Men	(Bulgaria); Filip Kaymakchiev	—		
October 17	Women	(Estonia); Eva-Lotta Kiibus	—		
October 17	Ice dance	(Germany); Jennifer Janse van Rensburg; Benjamin Steffan	—		
October 24	Men	(Austria); Maurizio Zandron	—		
October 24	Men	(Poland); Vladimir Samoilov	—		
October 24	Men	(Slovakia); Lukas Vaclavik	—		
October 24	Women	(Italy); Anna Pezzetta	—		
October 24	Ice dance	(Spain); Sofía Val; Asaf Kazimov	—	Injury (Val)	

== Results ==
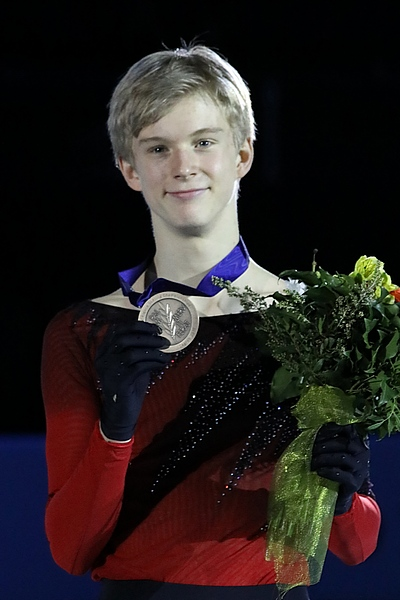
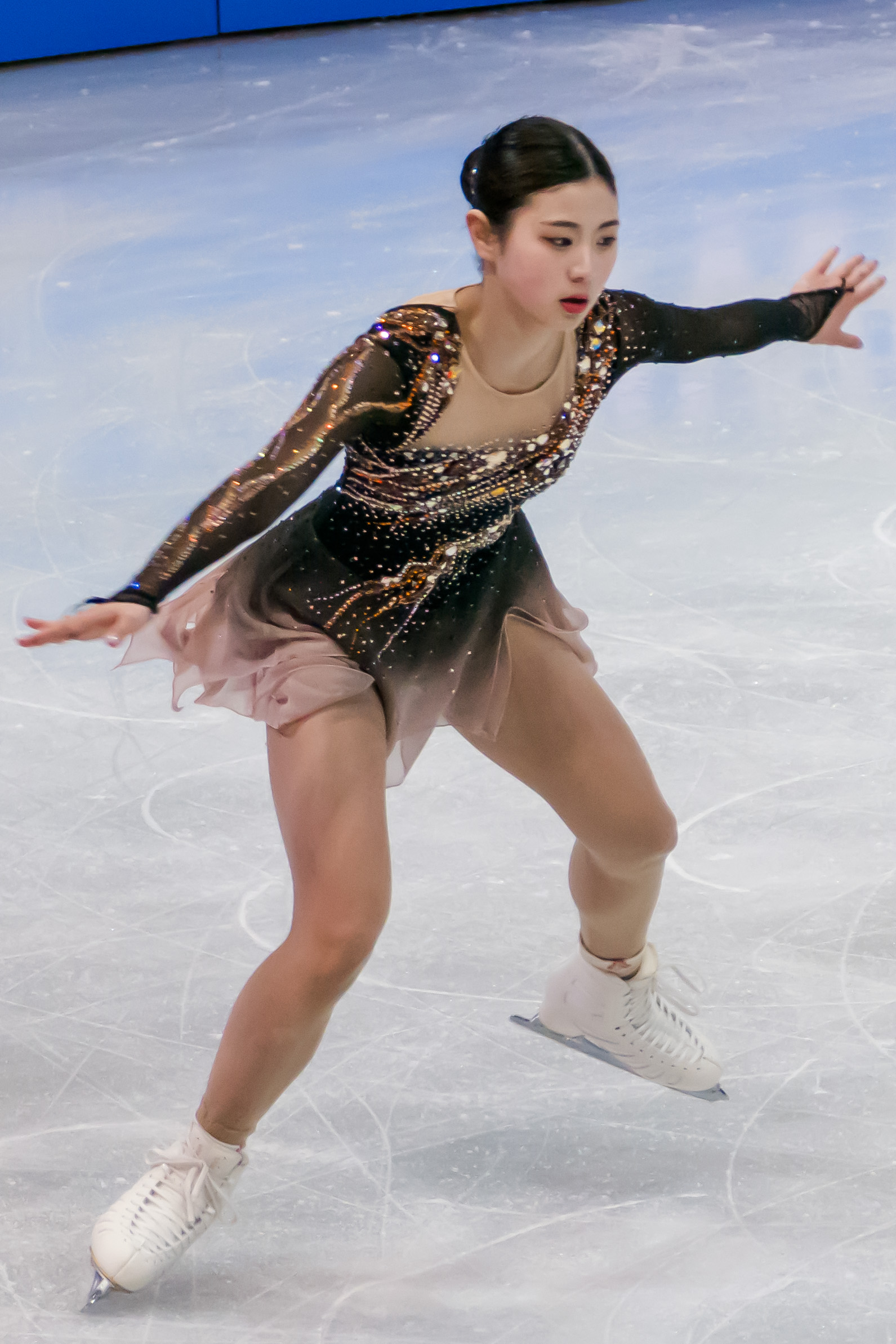
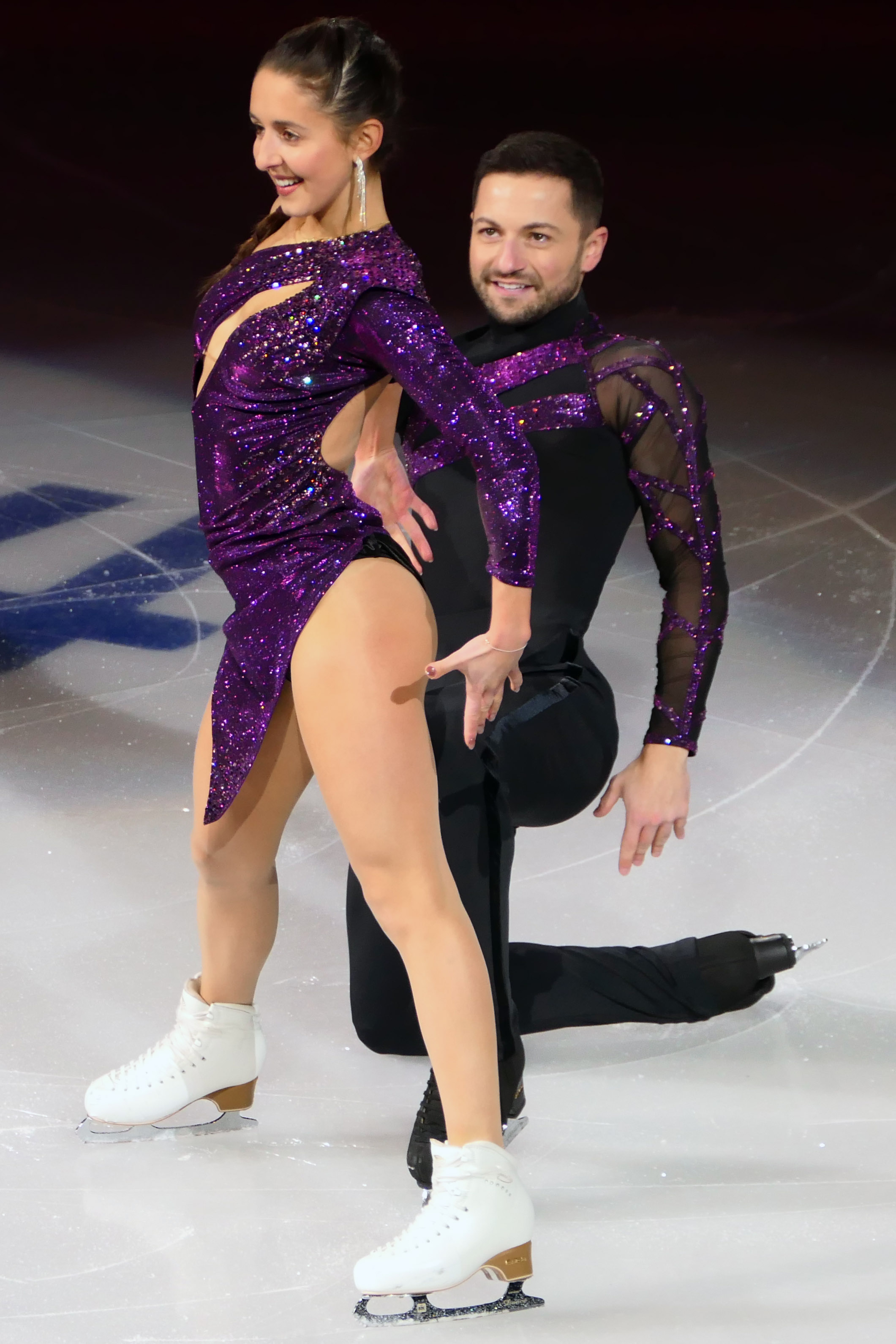
The 2024 Nepela Memorial champions: Daniel Grassl of Italy (men's singles); Yun Ah-sun of South Korea (women's singles); and Lilah Fear and Lewis Gibson of Great Britain (ice dance)

=== Men's singles ===
Men's results
Rank	Skater	Nation	Total points	SP		FS	
1st place, gold medalist(s)	Daniel Grassl	Italy	267.08	1	90.36	1	176.72
2nd place, silver medalist(s)	Nikolaj Memola	Italy	233.42	4	76.27	2	157.15
3rd place, bronze medalist(s)	Corey Circelli	Italy	232.26	3	77.48	3	154.78
4	Adam Hagara	Slovakia	227.58	2	78.12	4	149.46
5	Tomàs-Llorenç Guarino Sabaté	Spain	216.34	6	73.93	5	142.41
6	Kim Hang-il	South Korea	198.33	9	65.65	6	132.68
7	Edward Appleby	Great Britain	184.97	11	62.87	7	122.10
8	Georgii Reshtenko	Czech Republic	180.16	5	75.59	11	104.57
9	Arthur Wolfgang Mai	Germany	75.07	8	65.90	9	109.17
10	Vadym Novikov	Ukraine	172.65	12	57.60	8	115.05
11	Başar Oktar	Turkey	165.84	7	66.36	12	99.48
12	Arttu Juusola	Finland	163.30	13	57.55	10	105.75
13	Dias Jirenbayev	Kazakhstan	163.00	10	64.33	13	98.67
14	Daniel Korabelnik	Lithuania	150.39	14	54.59	14	95.80
15	Ken Fitterer	Great Britain	142.19	16	49.63	15	92.56
16	Iker Oyarzabal Albas	Spain	137.99	15	50.15	16	87.84

=== Women's singles ===
Women's results
Rank	Skater	Nation	Total points	SP		FS	
1st place, gold medalist(s)	Yun Ah-sun	South Korea	184.24	1	61.69	1	122.55
2nd place, silver medalist(s)	Mariia Seniuk	Israel	172.94	3	57.07	2	115.87
3rd place, bronze medalist(s)	Lara Naki Gutmann	Italy	172.15	2	57.67	3	114.48
4	Niki Wories	Netherlands	158.04	6	53.33	4	104.71
5	Sarina Joos	Italy	156.04	8	51.41	5	104.63
6	Meda Variakojyte	Lithuania	153.01	4	54.81	7	98.20
7	Nina Povey	Great Britain	146.78	11	48.01	6	98.77
8	Linnea Ceder	Finland	145.01	5	54.60	10	90.41
9	Vanesa Šelmeková	Slovakia	143.49	10	49.33	8	94.16
10	Kristina Isaev	Germany	140.72	9	49.38	9	91.34
11	Jogailė Aglinskytė	Lithuania	134.60	7	52.68	13	81.92
12	Ema Doboszová	Slovakia	134.04	12	47.39	11	86.65
13	Regina Schermann	Hungary	131.45	13	46.30	12	85.15
14	Yelizaveta Babenko	Ukraine	116.04	14	44.49	15	71.55
15	Dária Zsirnov	Hungary	114.33	15	41.30	14	73.03
16	Julia Fennell	Israel	93.89	16	32.33	16	61.56

=== Ice dance ===
Ice dance results
Rank	Team	Nation	Total points	RD		FD	
1st place, gold medalist(s)	Lilah Fear; Lewis Gibson	Great Britain	210.65	1	85.10	1	125.55
2nd place, silver medalist(s)	Diana Davis; Gleb Smolkin	Georgia	201.87	2	80.32	2	121.55
3rd place, bronze medalist(s)	Olivia Smart; Tim Dieck	Spain	191.46	4	74.77	3	116.69
4	Juulia Turkkila; Matthias Versluis	Finland	186.04	3	76.31	5	109.73
5	Loïcia Demougeot; Théo le Mercier	France	178.45	5	68.57	4	109.88
6	Milla Ruud Reitan; Nikolaj Majorov	Sweden	172.56	6	66.87	6	105.69
7	Maria Sofia Pucherová; Nikita Lysak	Slovakia	170.89	7	66.69	7	104.20
8	Victoria Manni; Carlo Röthlisberger	Italy	166.22	8	66.46	9	99.76
9	Darya Grimm; Michail Savitskiy	Germany	162.49	11	61.37	8	101.12
10	Mariia Pinchuk; Mykyta Pogorielov	Ukraine	162.28	9	65.93	10	96.35
11	Anna Simova; Kirill Aksenov	Slovakia	156.87	10	63.84	12	93.03
12	Xiao Zixi; He Linghao	China	150.11	14	55.05	11	95.06
13	Arianna Sassi; Luca Morini	Switzerland	142.63	12	59.65	14	82.98
14	Philomène Sabourin; Raul Bermejo	Spain	135.73	13	57.96	15	77.77
15	Lin Yufei; Gao Zijian	China	133.80	15	50.79	13	83.01
