= Meda Variakojytė =

Lithuanian figure skater (born 2007)

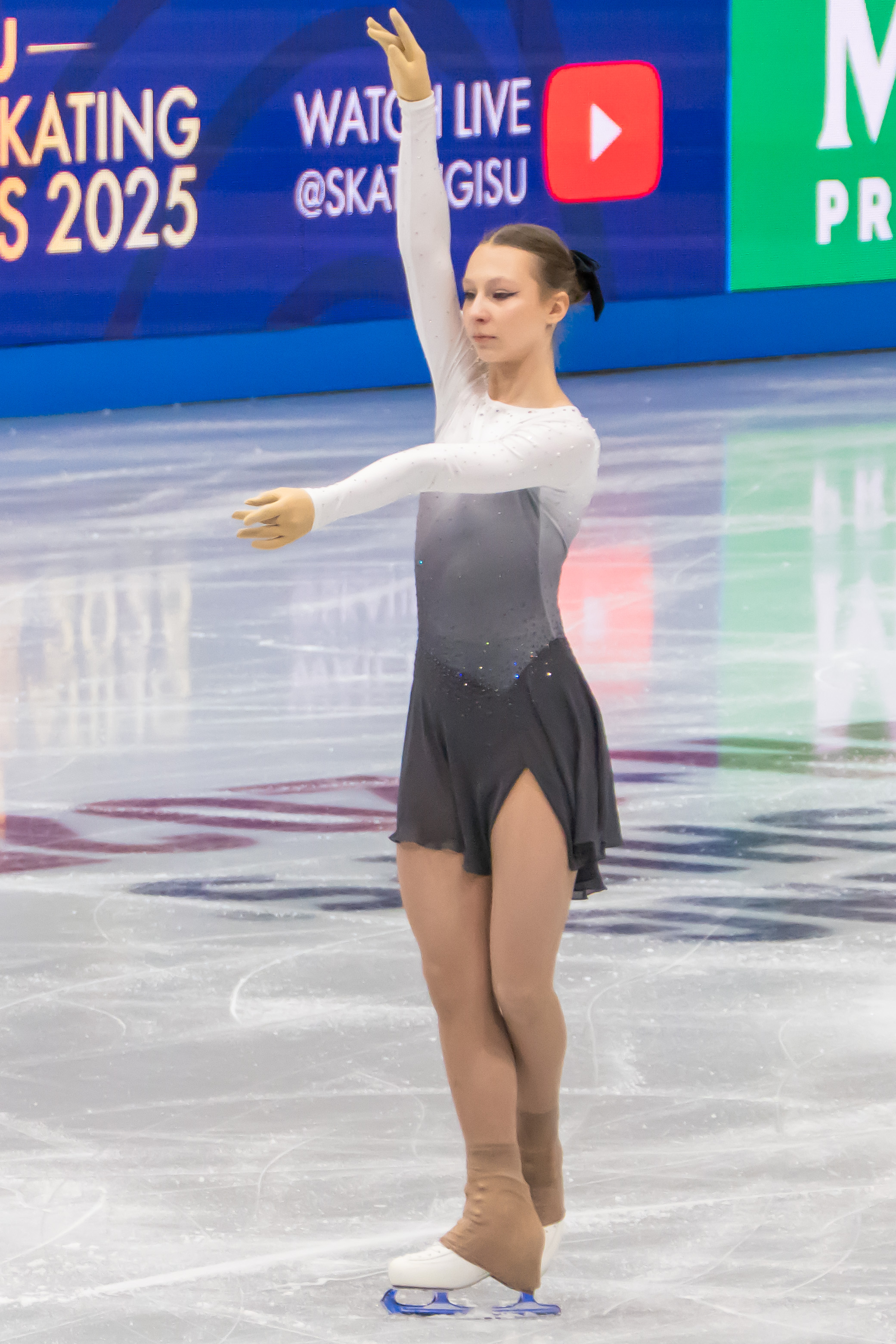
- Meda Variakojytė during her free skate at the 2025 World Championships

Personal information
- Born: 3 May 2007 (age 19) Kaunas, Lithuania
- Home town: Kaunas
- Height: 1.68 m (5 ft 6 in)

Figure skating career
- Country: Lithuania
- Discipline: Women's singles
- Coach: Raimo Reinsalu; Olga Kovalkova
- Skating club: Startas, Kaunas, Lithuania
- Began skating: 2012

Medal record
Lithuanian Championships
| Gold medal – first place | 2024 Kaunas | Singles |
| Gold medal – first place | 2025 Kaunas | Singles |
| Gold medal – first place | 2026 Kaunas | Singles |

Meda Variakojytė (born 3 May 2007) is a Lithuanian figure skater. She is the 2024 EduSport Trophy champion, the 2023 Kaunas Ice Autumn Cup champion, and a three-time Lithuanian national champion (2024–26). At the 2026 Winter Olympics, Variakojytė became the first Lithuanian figure skater to compete in the women's singles event.

Variakojytė is the 2023 Lithuanian junior national champion and the 2022 Lithuanian junior national silver medalist.

== Career ==
Variakojytė began figure skating in 2012 in her hometown, Kaunas. Her first coach was Indrė Paulaitienė, before Dmitrij Kozlov became her head coach in 2023.

She won the silver medal at the Lithuanian Junior Championships in 2022 and gold in 2023.

=== 2023–24 season: First National title, World Championship debut ===
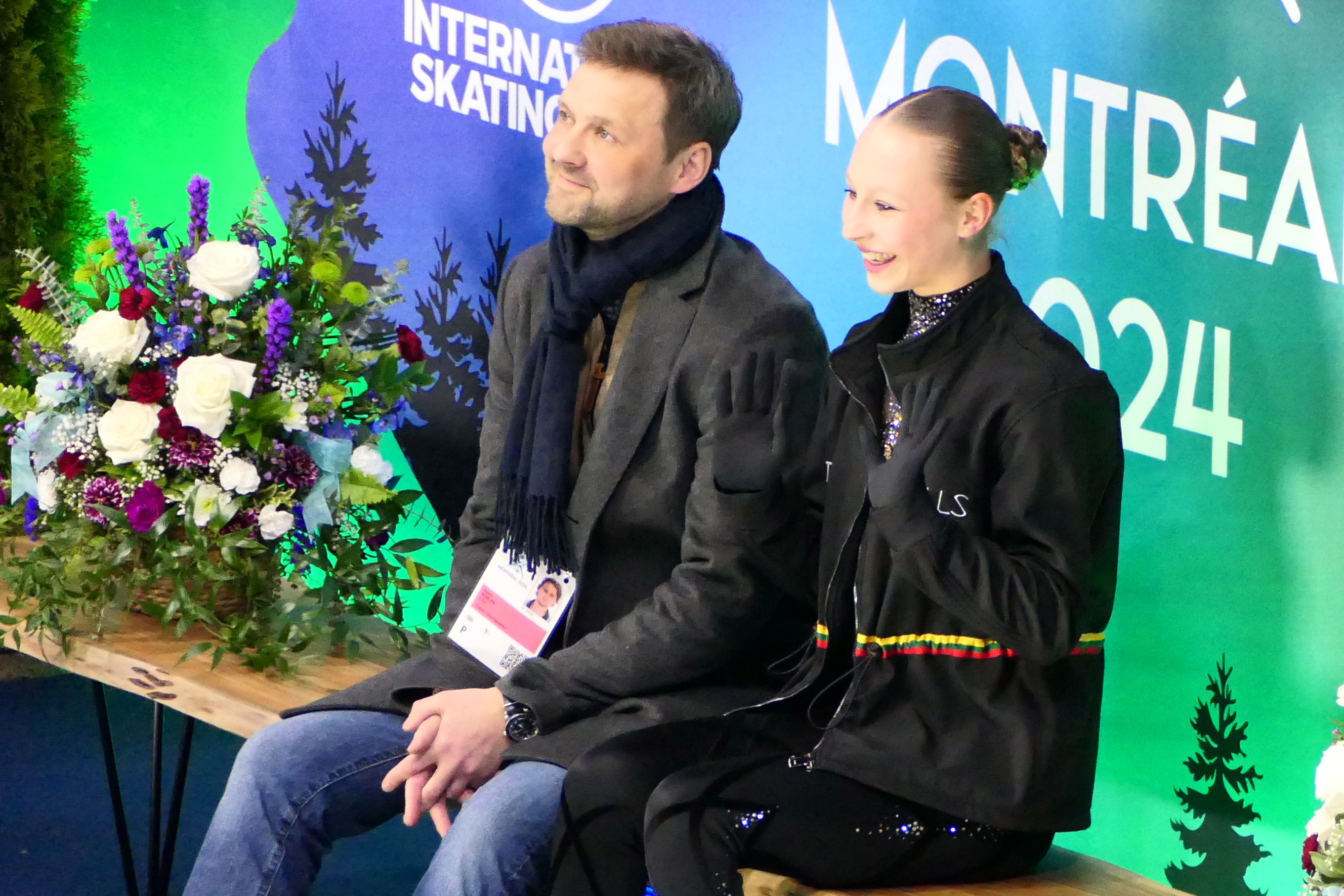
Variakojytė with coach, Dmitrij Kozlov, at the 2024 World Championships

Variakojytė began the season by finishing fifteenth at the 2023 Junior Grand Prix Turkey. She then competed at the 2023 Jelgava Cup in the senior level and won the silver medal with a score of 155.95. Additionally, she met the technical elements score requirement to compete at the 2024 World Championships. At the 2023 CS Nepela Memorial, she finished ninth and scored a personal best in the free skate. She then placed fourth at the senior 2023 Volvo Open Cup. She won a silver medal at the 2023 Bosphorus Cup behind Ting Tzu-Han.

Variakojytė won her first senior national title at the 2024 Lithuanian Championships. She competed at the 2024 World Junior Championships and finished thirty-ninth in the short program with a score of 43.57, failing to advance to the free skate segment. She also competed at the senior-level World Championships and finished thirty-fifth in the short program and did not advance to the free skate segment.

=== 2024–25 season ===
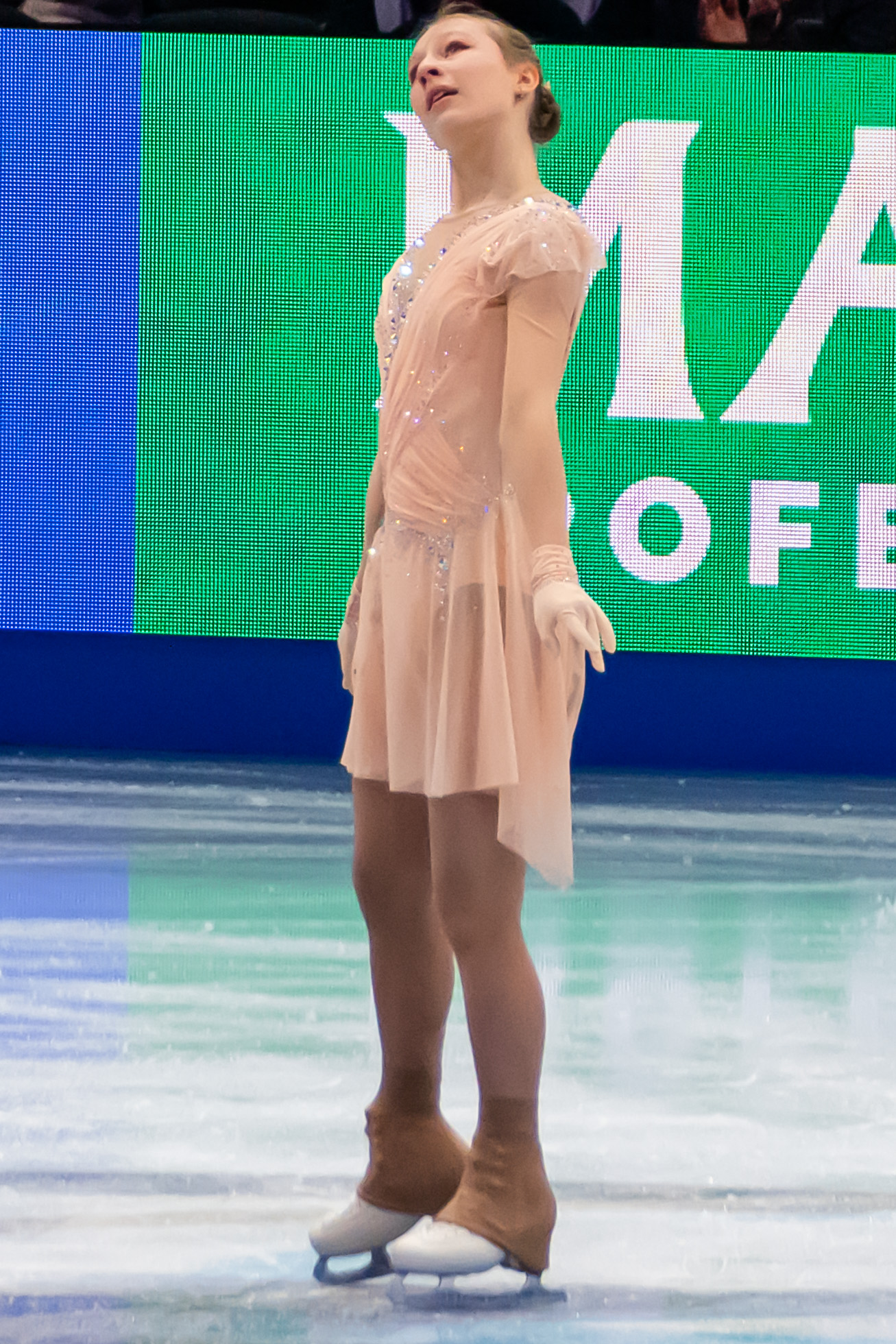
Variakojytė finishing her short program at the 2025 World Championships

Variakojytė started the season at the 2024 Junior Grand Prix Poland and finished seventeenth. She then finished sixth at the 2024 CS Nepela Memorial, earning new personal bests in the short program and total. At the 2024 CS Tallinn Trophy, she finished thirteenth. She then successfully defended her Lithuanian national title. She won another gold medal at the 2024 EduSport Trophy, and she won a silver medal at the 2025 Volvo Open Cup. She then finished fourth at the 2025 Tallink Hotels Cup.

Variakojytė competed at the 2025 World Championships and scored 50.98 points. She finished twenty-fourth in the short program and advanced to the free skate by only 0.01 points. As a result, Lithuania received a quota for the 2026 Winter Olympics, marking the first time Lithuania qualified a skater for the Olympics in women's singles. She went on to finish twenty-fourth overall.

=== 2025–26 season: Milano Cortina Olympics ===
In July, it was announced that Variakojytė had made a coaching change from Dmitrj Kozlov to Kirill Khaliavin and Jūlija Tepliha. She was one of three Lithuanian woman competing for the Lithuanian Olympic quota she had won; the Lithuanian federation announced the decision would be based on their results on the ISU Challenger Series as well as at the Lithuanian Championships in December. Variakojytė later alleged that communication from the Lithuanian Skating Federation about this process was poor and that her family had to pay for her to attend the Challenger competitions.

At the Volvo Open Cup in November, she scored just over 60 points in her short program, which was a Lithuanian national record.

In December, Variakojytė was ill and competed at the 2026 Lithuanian Championships with a fever. Despite this, she won the event and was awarded the 2026 Winter Olympic spot. The following month, it was announced that Variakojytė had moved her training to Riga, Latvia, with Raimo Reinsalu and Olga Kovalkova acting as her new coaches.

According to Lilija Vanagienė, a previous president of the Lithuanian Skating Federation, Variakojytė should have been selected for the 2026 European Championships after winning the Lithuanian national title, according to criteria established beforehand. However, Jogailė Aglinskytė was sent instead, allegedly at the decision of the Federation president, Vytautas Jasuctis. Variakojytė said that she was not notified and only learned she would not be attending the European Championships from the news shortly before the competition started. Vanagienė also alleged that Variakojytė was afraid to ask the reasoning behind the decision in case she would be removed from the Olympic team. Jasuctis said that Variakojytė was not sent because she would lose valuable training time for the Olympics.

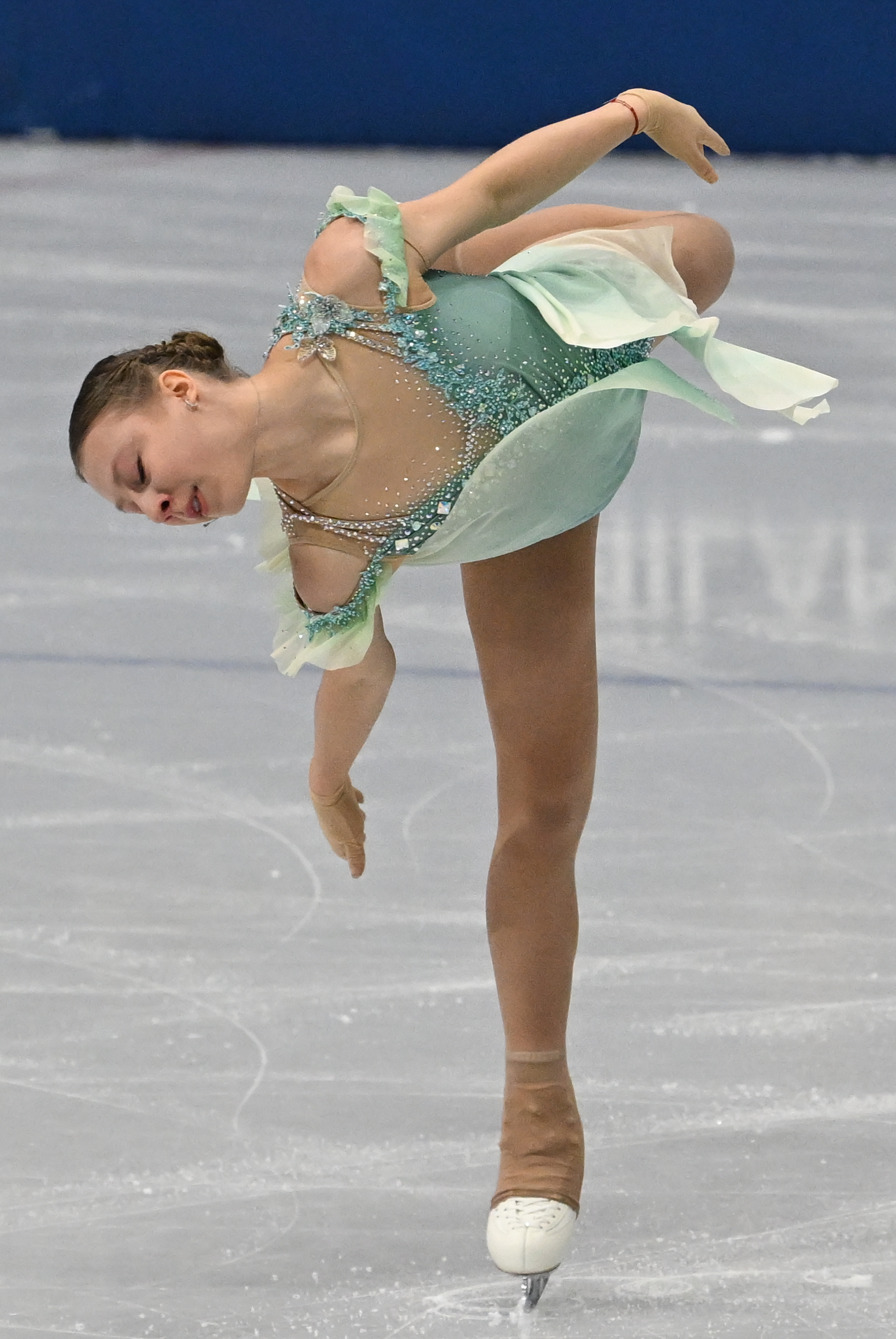
Variakojytė at the 2026 Winter Olympics

On 7 February, 2026, Reinsalu's accreditation for the Olympics was revoked by the Latvian Olympic Committee after the International Skating Union suspended him following accusations of abuse. Variakojytė indicated that she had not experienced abusive behavior from him herself. She was accompanied at the Olympics by the director of the Lithuanian Skating Federation instead, in addition to Kolvakova. Reinsalu filed an appeal to the Court of Arbitration for Sport, which was denied. Ice dancer Saulius Ambrulevičius also accompanied her after he finished competing.

During the 2026 Olympic women's singles short program, Variakojytė placed twenty-seventh in that segment and did not advance to the free skate. Despite this, she expressed joy at the opportunity of getting to compete at the Olympics. "It was amazing. I stepped onto the ice and it was so, so exciting. I wanted to cry. I couldn’t believe it. It was unbelievable," she said following her short program... I'm really satisfied with my performance. I made a small mistake... But overall I'm very happy with how I skated."

Variakojytė was subsequently selected to be a flag bearer for Lithuania during the Olympic closing ceremony, along with cross-country skier Modestas Vaičiulis.

At the 2026 World Championships, she finished 31st in the short program segment and did not qualify for the free skate. She competed without either of her coaches, as neither were allowed to attend the World Championships while they were under investigation.

== Programs ==
| Season | Short program | Free skating |
|---|---|---|
| 2026–2027 | Nureyev (from "The White Crow") by Ilan Eshkeri, Lisa Batiashvili; Obscura by Power Haus, Christian Reindl, Lucie Paradis choreo. by Selina Kaneda | Should It Be This Hard? by Evelyn Bates; The Greatest by Billie Eilish choreo. by Selina Kaneda |
| 2025–2026 | Je te laisserai des mots by Patrick Watson; Rumination by BAANDIT! choreo. by Jūlija Tepliha | Should It Be This Hard? by Evelyn Bates; Maison by Emilio Piano ft. Lucie choreo. by Kirill Khaliavin |
| 2024–2025 | Je te laisserai des mots by Patrick Watson; Rumination by BAANDIT! choreo. by Jūlija Tepliha | Van Gogh by Virginio Aiello; Voilà by Barbara Pravi choreo. by Saulius Ambrulevičius |
| 2023–2024 | Bang Bang by Sharon Kovacs choreo. by Saulius Ambrulevičius | Van Gogh by Virginio Aiello; Voilà by Barbara Pravi choreo. by Saulius Ambrulevičius |
| 2022–2023 | The Chairman's Waltz; Becoming a Geisha (from Memoirs of a Geisha) by John Williams choreo. by Saulius Ambrulevičius | Dance of the Sugar Plum Fairy (from The Nutcracker and the Four Realms) performed by L'Orchestra Cinematique choreo. by Saulius Ambrulevičius |
| 2021–2022 | Maybe I Maybe You by Scorpions choreo. by Regvita Janavičiūtė | The Nutcracker by Pyotr Ilyich Tchaikovsky choreo. by Regvita Janavičiūtė |

== Competitive highlights ==
- CS – Event of the ISU Challenger Series
- JGP – Event of the ISU Junior Grand Prix
- TBD – Assigned
- WD – Withdrew from competition

Competition placements at senior level
| Season | 2022–23 | 2023–24 | 2024–25 | 2025–26 | 2026–27 |
|---|---|---|---|---|---|
| Winter Olympics | | | | 27th | |
| World Championships | | 35th | 24th | 31st | |
| Lithuanian Championships | | 1st | 1st | 1st | |
| CS Golden Spin of Zagreb | | | | 15th | |
| CS Nepela Memorial | | 9th | 6th | | |
| CS Tallinn Trophy | | | 13th | | |
| CS Trialeti Trophy | | | | 16th | |
| CS Warsaw Cup | | | | 5th | |
| CS Budapest Trophy | | | | | 28th |
| EduSport Trophy | 4th | | 1st | | |
| Jelgava Cup | | 2nd | | | |
| Kaunas Cup | | 1st | | | |
| Latvia Trophy | 7th | | | | |
| Tallink Hotels Cup | | | 4th | | |
| Volvo Open Cup (Note: Volvo Open Cup Fall) | 14th | 4th | | 3rd | |
| Volvo Open Cup (Note: Volvo Open Cup Spring) | 8th | | 2nd | 2nd | |
| Wolmar Cup | 3rd | | | | |
| Bosphorus Cup | | 2nd | | | |

Competition placements at junior level
| Season | 2021–22 | 2022–23 | 2023–24 | 2024–25 |
|---|---|---|---|---|
| World Junior Championships | | | 39th | |
| Lithuanian Championships | 2nd | 1st | | |
| JGP Italy | | 27th | | |
| JGP Latvia | | 19th | | |
| JGP Poland | | | | 17th |
| JGP Turkey | | | 15th | |
| Dragon Trophy | 11th | | 5th | |
| Volvo Open Cup | 13th | | 3rd | |

== Detailed results ==
ISU personal best scores in the +5/-5 GOE System
| Segment | Type | Score | Event |
|---|---|---|---|
| Total | TSS | 157.17 | 2025 CS Warsaw Cup |
| Short program | TSS | 54.81 | 2024 CS Nepela Memorial |
| Short program | TES | 31.10 | 2025 CS Warsaw Cup |
| Short program | PCS | 24.09 | 2026 Winter Olympics |
| Free skating | TSS | 103.86 | 2025 CS Warsaw Cup |
| Free skating | TES | 56.47 | 2025 CS Warsaw Cup |
| Free skating | PCS | 47.79 | 2024 CS Nepela Memorial |

=== Senior level ===
Results in the 2022–23 season
| Date | Event | SP | | FS | | Total | |
| Date | Event | P | Score | P | Score | P | Score |
|---|---|---|---|---|---|---|---|
| Nov 3–4, 2022 | (Latvia) 2022 Volvo Open Cup (Fall) | 15 | 28.88 | 11 | 82.59 | 14 | 111.47 |
| Dec 16–18, 2022 | 2022 Latvia Trophy | 4 | 53.86 | 7 | 85.70 | 7 | 142.53 |
| Jan 11–15, 2023 | (Romania) 2023 EduSport Trophy | 4 | 50.20 | 4 | 93.01 | 4 | 143.21 |
| Jan 19–22, 2023 | (Latvia) 2023 Volvo Open Cup (Winter) | 9 | 43.95 | 8 | 85.41 | 8 | 129.36 |
| Apr 7–9, 2023 | (Latvia) 2023 Wolmar Cup | 3 | 41.73 | 3 | 88.91 | 3 | 130.64 |

Results in the 2023–24 season
| Date | Event | SP | | FS | | Total | |
| Date | Event | P | Score | P | Score | P | Score |
|---|---|---|---|---|---|---|---|
| Sep 16–17, 2023 | (Latvia) 2023 Jelgava Cup | 5 | 48.49 | 2 | 107.46 | 2 | 155.95 |
| Sep 28–30, 2023 | (Slovakia) 2023 CS Nepela Memorial | 10 | 50.34 | 9 | 102.24 | 9 | 152.58 |
| Oct 20–22, 2023 | (Lithuania) 2023 Kaunas Cup | 2 | 51.36 | 1 | 105.89 | 1 | 157.25 |
| Nov 2–5, 2023 | (Latvia) 2023 Volvo Open Cup | 6 | 50.33 | 5 | 101.31 | 4 | 151.64 |
| Nov 27 – Dec 3, 2023 | (Turkey) 2023 Bosphorus Cup | 5 | 48.86 | 1 | 114.46 | 2 | 163.32 |
| Dec 16–17, 2023 | (Lithuania) 2024 Lithuanian Championships | 1 | 53.94 | 1 | 106.03 | 1 | 159.97 |
| Mar 18–24, 2024 | (Canada) 2024 World Championships | 35 | 40.04 | —N/a | —N/a | 35 | 40.04 |

Results in the 2024–25 season
| Date | Event | SP | | FS | | Total | |
| Date | Event | P | Score | P | Score | P | Score |
|---|---|---|---|---|---|---|---|
| Oct 25–27, 2024 | (Slovakia) 2024 CS Nepela Memorial | 4 | 54.81 | 7 | 98.20 | 6 | 153.01 |
| Nov 12–17, 2024 | (Estonia) 2024 CS Tallinn Trophy | 9 | 49.61 | 14 | 82.69 | 13 | 132.30 |
| Nov 30 – Dec 1, 2024 | (Lithuania) 2025 Lithuanian Championships | 1 | 51.30 | 1 | 102.68 | 1 | 153.98 |
| Dec 12–15, 2024 | (Romania) 2024 EduSport Trophy | 1 | 54.45 | 1 | 101.23 | 1 | 155.68 |
| Jan 16–19, 2025 | (Latvia) 2025 Volvo Open Cup | 2 | 51.42 | 2 | 102.89 | 2 | 154.31 |
| Feb 13–16, 2025 | (Estonia) 2025 Tallink Hotels Cup | 4 | 53.45 | 5 | 95.19 | 4 | 148.64 |
| Mar 24–30, 2025 | (United States) 2025 World Championships | 24 | 50.98 | 24 | 88.83 | 24 | 139.81 |

Results in the 2025–26 season
| Date | Event | SP | | FS | | Total | |
| Date | Event | P | Score | P | Score | P | Score |
|---|---|---|---|---|---|---|---|
| Oct 8–11, 2025 | (Georgia (country)) 2025 CS Trialeti Trophy | 18 | 47.95 | 14 | 98.99 | 16 | 146.94 |
| Nov 5–9, 2025 | (Latvia) 2025 Volvo Open Cup | 2 | 60.03 | 4 | 100.97 | 3 | 161.00 |
| Nov 19–23, 2025 | (Poland) 2025 CS Warsaw Cup | 7 | 53.31 | 5 | 103.86 | 5 | 157.17 |
| Dec 3–6, 2025 | (Croatia) 2025 CS Golden Spin of Zagreb | 25 | 42.31 | 12 | 99.72 | 15 | 142.03 |
| Dec 13–14, 2025 | (Lithuania) 2026 Lithuanian Championships | 1 | 53.62 | 1 | 114.37 | 1 | 167.99 |
| Jan 22–25, 2026 | (Latvia) 2026 Volvo Open Cup | 4 | 55.83 | 2 | 109.34 | 2 | 165.17 |
| Feb 17–19, 2026 | (Italy) 2026 Winter Olympics | 27 | 53.86 | —N/a | —N/a | 27 | 53.86 |
| Mar 24–29, 2026 | (Czech Republic) 2026 World Championships | 31 | 45.47 | —N/a | —N/a | 31 | 45.47 |

=== Junior level ===
Results in the 2021–22 season
| Date | Event | SP | | FS | | Total | |
| Date | Event | P | Score | P | Score | P | Score |
|---|---|---|---|---|---|---|---|
| Nov 3–7, 2021 | (Latvia) 2021 Volvo Open Cup | 15 | 35.51 | 13 | 63.65 | 13 | 99.16 |
| Dec 3–5, 2021 | (Lithuania) 2023 Lithuanian Junior Championships | 4 | 37.75 | 2 | 71.38 | 2 | 109.13 |
| Feb 10–13, 2022 | (Slovenia) 2022 Dragon Trophy | 12 | 38.95 | 10 | 72.39 | 11 | 111.34 |

Results in the 2022–23 season
| Date | Event | SP | | FS | | Total | |
| Date | Event | P | Score | P | Score | P | Score |
|---|---|---|---|---|---|---|---|
| Sept 7–10, 2022 | 2022 JGP Latvia | 16 | 43.42 | 22 | 75.27 | 19 | 118.69 |
| Oct 11–15, 2022 | 2022 JGP Italy | 38 | 32.17 | 21 | 83.05 | 27 | 115.22 |
| Nov 26–27, 2022 | (Lithuania) 2023 Lithuanian Junior Championships | 1 | 37.78 | 1 | 77.98 | 1 | 115.76 |

Results in the 2023–24 season
| Date | Event | SP | | FS | | Total | |
| Date | Event | P | Score | P | Score | P | Score |
|---|---|---|---|---|---|---|---|
| Sep 6–9, 2023 | 2023 JGP Turkey | 25 | 33.37 | 11 | 87.14 | 15 | 120.51 |
| Jan 18–21, 2024 | (Latvia) 2024 Volvo Open Cup | 4 | 53.05 | 3 | 101.08 | 3 | 154.13 |
| Feb 8–11, 2024 | (Slovenia) 2024 Dragon Trophy | 1 | 53.86 | 8 | 80.24 | 5 | 134.10 |
| 24 Feb – 3 Mar, 2024 | (Chinese Taipei) 2024 World Junior Championships | 39 | 43.57 | —N/a | —N/a | 39 | 43.57 |

Results in the 2024–25 season
| Date | Event | SP | | FS | | Total | |
| Date | Event | P | Score | P | Score | P | Score |
|---|---|---|---|---|---|---|---|
| Sep 25–28, 2024 | 2024 JGP Poland | 19 | 44.94 | 16 | 88.86 | 17 | 133.80 |
