= Jogailė Aglinskytė =

Lithuanian figure skater (born 2005)

Personal information
- Born: 16 November 2005 (age 20) Vilnius, Lithuania
- Home town: Vilnius
- Height: 1.67 m (5 ft 6 in)

Figure skating career
- Country: Lithuania
- Discipline: Women's singles
- Coach: Rosanna Murante; Tiziana Rosaspina
Medal record
Lithuanian Championships
Silver medal – second place	2026 Kaunas	Singles
Silver medal – second place	2025 Kaunas	Singles
Bronze medal – third place	2024 Kaunas	Singles
Bronze medal – third place	2023 Kaunas	Singles

Jogailė Aglinskytė (born 16 November 2005) is a Lithuanian figure skater.

She is the two time (2025–2026) Lithuanian national silver medalist.

== Personal life ==
Aglinskytė was born on 16 November 2005, in Vilnius, Lithuania. In 2024, she began studying marketing at Vytautas Magnus University.

== Career ==
=== Early years ===
Aglinskytė began learning how to skate in 2011.

=== 2019–2020 season ===
Aglinskytė made her junior international debut by competing at the 2019 NRW Trophy, where she finished in fourth place. She then competed on the 2019–20 ISU Junior Grand Prix, placing fourteenth at 2019 JGP France and at 2019 JGP Latvia. Aglinskytė subsequently followed up these results by placing fourteenth on the junior at the 2019 IceLab International Cup and fifth on the junior level at the 2019 Tallinn Trophy.

In January, she competed on the junior level at the 2020 Mentor Toruń Cup and the 2020 Dragon Trophy, winning bronze and gold, respectively. Selected to compete at the 2020 Junior World Championships, Aglinskytė closed the season by placing forty-first at the event.

=== 2020–2021 season ===
Aglinskytė started the season by placing fourth on the junior level at the 2020 Budapest Trophy. She then won gold on the junior level at the 2021 Tallink Hotels Cup, before finishing the season by winning bronze on the junior level at the 2021 Egna Spring Trophy.

=== 2021–2022 season ===
Aglinskytė broke her left leg in July and did not begin competing until February.

Her first competition of the season was the 2022 Sofia Trophy, where she competed on the senior level, finishing in fifth place. She followed this up by placing sixth and fifth at the 2022 Dragon Trophy and the 2022 Tallink Hotels Cup.

She returned to the junior level for the 2022 European Youth Olympic Winter Festival in March. She finished eighth in the short program but fell several times in her free skate, and she finished in ninth place overall. Hers was the highest placement achieved by a Lithuanian athlete at the festival. That same month, Aglinskytė shared that she was still struggling to fully control her leg following the injury she had sustained in the summer.

In April, she competed at the 2022 Junior World Championships. She placed twenty-third in the short program and twenty-fourth in the free skate, finishing in twenty-fourth place overall.

=== 2022–2023 season ===
Aglinskytė started the season by finishing twentieth at the 2022 CS Warsaw Cup. She followed this up by winning the bronze medal at the 2023 Lithuanian Championships behind Aleksandra Dolinskė and Daria Afinogenova. She then went on to place ninth at the 2022 Latvia Trophy.

Aglinskytė was to make her European Championships debut at the 2023 European Championships after replacing Aleksandra Dolinskė as the Lithuanian representative; however, two days before the competition, she also withdrew due to experiencing back pain. She subsequently placed eleventh at the 2023 Tallink Hotels Cup, and thirteenth at the 2023 Bellu Memorial, before closing the season with a fourth-place finish at the 2023 Wolmar Cup.

=== 2023–2024 season ===
Aglinskytė began the season by finishing eighth at the 2023 Jelgava Cup and sixteenth at the 2023 CS Nepela Memorial.

In December, Aglinskytė competed in the Latvia Trophy, where she placed fifth. The week after, she won the bronze medal at the 2024 Lithuanian Championships behind Meda Variakojytė and Aleksandra Dolinskė.

=== 2024–2025 season ===
Aglinskytė opened the season by placing eleventh at the 2024 CS Nepela Memorial, sixth at the 2024 Volvo Open Cup, sixth at the 2024 NRW Trophy, and eleventh at the 2024 CS Warsaw Cup.

In late November, Aglinskytė won the silver medal at the 2025 Lithuanian Championships behind Meda Variakojytė. The following week, she placed twelfth at the 2024 CS Golden Spin of Zagreb.

In January, Aglinskytė competed at the 2025 Sofia Trophy and the 2025 Winter World University Games, placing fourteenth and twentieth, respectively. She then competed in her first European Championships. In the short program, she had a mistake on her first jump but skated the rest of her program cleanly. She qualified for the free skate, which she said she was "very happy" about. She finished in twenty-fourth place after the free skate, in which she fell. Aglinskytė expressed disappointment with her performance, but she said that she would try to use the experience to improve her preparations for future competitions; she noted that she had focused more on being able to skate her short program, so she could qualify for the free skate, and had probably not worked enough on her free program.

Aglinskytė subsequently closed the season by placing eleventh at the 2025 Maria Olszewska Memorial and seventh at the 2025 Daugava Open Cup.

=== 2025–2026 season ===
In July, it was announced that Aglinskytė had relocated to Bergamo, Italy, where her new coaches included Kirill Khaliavin and Jūlija Tepliha. She was one of three Lithuanian woman competing for the Lithuanian Olympic quota won by Meda Variakojytė; the Lithuanian federation announced the decision would be based on their results on the ISU Challenger Series as well as at the Lithuanian Championships in December.

In September, it was announced that she had begun working with a new coaching staff, Rosanna Murante and Tiziana Rosaspina. She started the season that same month with a thirteenth-place finish at the 2025 CS Lombardia Trophy. Aglinskytė followed this up by winning silver at the 2025 Diamond Spin and fifteenth at the 2025 Denkova-Staviski Cup. Going on to compete on the 2025–26 Challenger Series, she placed eighth at the 2025 CS Warsaw Cup and twenty-third at the 2025 CS Golden Spin of Zagreb.

At the 2026 Lithuanian Championships in December, she finished in second place. Based on the results of the internal selection, Variakojytė was awarded the Olympic spot. Afterward, Aglinksytė commented that she was proud of her performance at the Championships and that she was happy for Variakojytė, with whom she was friends and previously training mates: "I'm very happy for her, because when we trained together, I saw how hard she tried, how much work she put in. She definitely deserved it 100 percent. When she won that place, it was a historic moment, I hope she will succeed and I'm very happy."

The following month, Aglinskytė competed at the 2026 European Championships in Sheffield, England, United Kingdom, where she finished in twenty-fourth place. One week later, she won the bronze medal at the 2026 EDGE Cup.

== Programs ==
Season	Short program	Free skating
2025–2026	T'es où by Camille Lellouche choreo. by Kirill Khalyavin	The Tearsmith; The Tear Maker; Lullaby by Andrea Farri & Valentina Costanzo choreo. by Jūlija Tepliha
2024–2025	Can't Help Falling in Love (Dark Version) by Tommee Profitt ft. Brooke choreo. by Ivan Righini	The Tearsmith; The Tear Maker; Lullaby by Andrea Farri & Valentina Costanzo choreo. by Jūlija Tepliha
2023–2024	Freakshow; Cheap Smell by Sharon Kovacs choreo. by Saulius Ambrulevičius, Allison Reed	Lovely by Billie Eilish, Khalid, & Finneas O'Connell; Copycat (from Spartacus) by Billie Eilish & Finneas O'Connell choreo. by Matteo Zanni
2022–2023	Freakshow; Cheap Smell by Sharon Kovacs choreo. by Saulius Ambrulevičius, Allison Reed	Estaciones Porteñas; Invierno Porteño; Primavera Porteña by Astor Piazzolla performed by Kremerata Baltica choreo. by Nikita Mikhailov
2021–2022	All Is Soft Inside by AURORA choreo. by Saulius Ambrulevičius, Allison Reed	Estaciones Porteñas; Invierno Porteño; Primavera Porteña by Astor Piazzolla performed by Kremerata Baltica choreo. by Nikita Mikhailov
2020–2021	All Is Soft Inside by AURORA choreo. by Saulius Ambrulevičius, Allison Reed	Angel by the Wings by Sia choreo. by Jūlija Tepliha
2019–2020	Never Enough (from The Greatest Showman) by Loren Allred choreo. by Valentin Molotov, Nikita Mikhailov, Ingrida Snieskiene	She Is Like the Swallow by Lucia Micarelli choreo. by Valentin Molotov, Nikita Mikhailov, Ingrida Snieskiene

== Competitive highlights ==
- JGP – Event of the ISU Junior Grand Prix Series
- CS – Event of the ISU Challenger Series
- TBD – Assigned
- WD – Withdrew from competition

Competition placements at senior level
Season	2021–22	2022–23	2023–24	2024–25	2025–26
European Championships				24th	24th
Lithuanian Championships		3rd	3rd	2nd	2nd
CS Golden Spin of Zagreb				12th	23rd
CS Lombardia Trophy					13th
CS Ondrej Nepela Memorial			16th		
CS Warsaw Cup		20th		11th	8th
Bellu Memorial		13th			
Denkova-Staviski Cup					15th
Dragon Trophy	6th				
EDGE Cup					3rd
Jelgava Cup			8th		
Latvia Trophy		9th	5th		
NRW Trophy				6th	
Sofia Trophy				14th	
Tallink Hotels Cup	5th	11th			
Winter University Games				20th	
Volvo Open				6th	
Wolmar Cup		4th			

Competition placements at junior level
Season	2019–20	2020–21	2021–22
World Junior Championships	41st		24th
JGP France	14th		
JGP Latvia	14th		
Budapest Trophy		4th	
Dragon Trophy	1st		
Egna Trophy		3rd	
European Youth Olympic Festival			9th
IceLab International Cup	14th		
NRW Trophy	4th		
Tallink Hotels Cup		1st	
Tallinn Trophy	5th		
Toruń Cup	3rd		

== Detailed results ==
ISU personal best scores in the +5/-5 GOE System
Segment	Type	Score	Event
Total	TSS	151.85	2025 CS Warsaw Cup
Short program	TSS	52.68	2024 CS Nepela Memorial
Short program	TES	29.87	2024 CS Nepela Memorial
Short program	PCS	26.06	2022 World Junior Championships
Free skating	TSS	104.49	2024 CS Golden Spin of Zagreb
Free skating	TES	54.16	2024 CS Golden Spin of Zagreb
Free skating	PCS	50.59	2025 CS Warsaw Cup

=== Senior level ===
Results in the 2025–26 season
Date	Event	SP		FS		Total	
Date	Event	P	Score	P	Score	P	Score
11–14 Sep 2025	(Italy) 2025 CS Lombardia Trophy	13	50.20	11	99.81	13	150.01
7–9 Nov 2025	(Bulgaria) 2025 Denkova-Staviski Cup	21	42.61	12	86.96	15	129.57
19–23 Nov 2025	(Poland) 2025 CS Warsaw Cup	8	51.98	8	99.87	8	151.85
3–6 Dec 2025	(Croatia) 2025 CS Golden Spin of Zagreb	19	48.54	23	79.80	23	128.34
13–14 Dec 2025	(Lithuania) 2026 Lithuanian Championships	2	52.80	2	112.01	2	164.81
13–18 Jan 2026	(United Kingdom) 2026 European Championships	24	50.30	24	63.71	24	114.01
27 Jan – 1 February 2026	(Poland) 2026 EDGE Cup	1	58.10	3	97.38	3	155.48
