= Nikita Ermolaev =

Russian pair skater

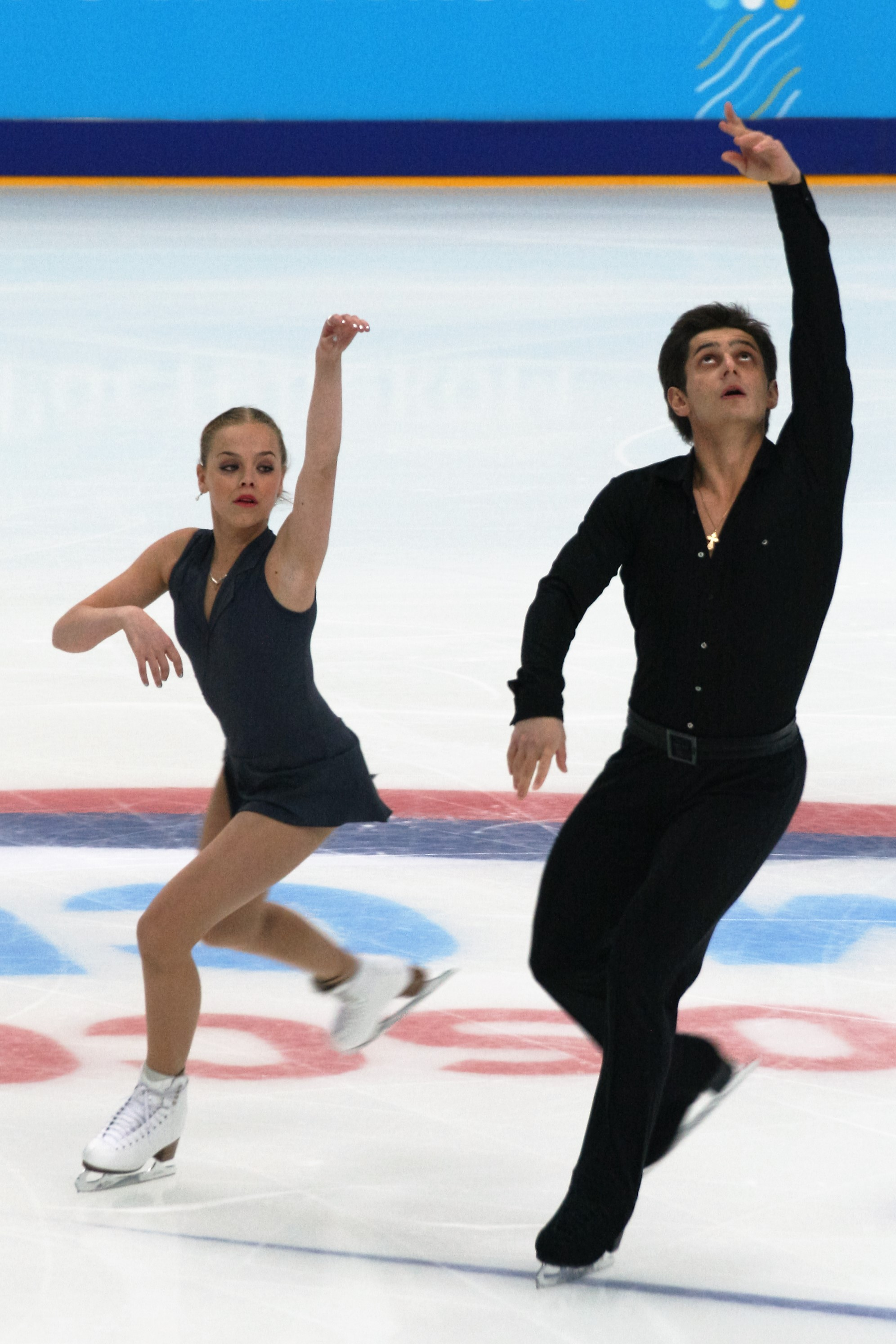
- Goda Butkutė and Nikita Ermolaev at the 2016 Rostelecom Cup

Personal information
- Native name: Никита Владиленович Ермолаев
- Full name: Nikita Vladilenovich Ermolaev
- Other names: Lithuanian: Nikita Jermolajevas
- Born: 11 July 1991 (age 35) Leningrad, Russia
- Home town: Saint Petersburg, Russia
- Height: 1.75 m (5 ft 9 in)

Figure skating career
- Country: Lithuania (2012–17); Russia (2011–12)
- Discipline: Pair skating
- Partner: Goda Butkutė (2012–17); Daria Beklemisheva (2011–12)
- Began skating: 1999

Medal record
Lithuanian Championships
Gold medal – first place	2013 Kaunas	Pairs
Gold medal – first place	2015 Kaunas	Pairs
Gold medal – first place	2016 Kaunas	Pairs
Gold medal – first place	2017 Kaunas	Pairs

Nikita Vladilenovich Ermolaev (Russian: Никита Владиленович Ермолаев; born 11 July 1991) is a Russian pair skater. Competing with Goda Butkutė for Lithuania, he has won five senior international medals, including three on the ISU Challenger Series.

== Personal life ==
Nikita Ermolaev was born on 11 July 1991 in Leningrad (Saint Petersburg), Russia.

== Career ==
Ermolaev started skating in 1999. As a single skater, he was coached by Valentina Chebotareva. In the 2011–12 season, he competed with Daria Beklemisheva in pair skating. Coached by Nikolai Velikov in Saint Petersburg, the pair placed tenth at the 2012 Russian Junior Championships.

=== Pair skating with Goda Butkutė (for Lithuania) ===
Ermolaev's partnership with Lithuanian skater Goda Butkutė began in the 2012–13 season. They competed only in Lithuania and Russia during their first three seasons as a pair.

Representing Lithuania, Butkutė/Ermolaev appeared in their first International Skating Union competitions in the 2015–16 season. Konstantin Bezmaternykh coaches the pair in Saint Petersburg. They were awarded silver at their first event, the Lombardia Trophy in September 2015. In October, they won bronze at the 2015 Mordovian Ornament, their ISU Challenger Series (CS) debut. In November, the pair placed fourth at the 2015 CS Tallinn Trophy and took bronze at the 2015 CS Warsaw Cup.

In January 2016, Butkutė/Ermolaev placed 11th in both segments and overall at the European Championships in Bratislava. In March, they competed at the 2016 World Championships in Boston; ranked 17th in the short program, they missed qualifying for the free skate by one spot.

== Programs ==
=== Pair skating with Goda Butkutė (for Lithuania) ===
Season	Short program	Free skating
2016-18	Maybe I, Maybe You by Scorpions	Exogenesis: Symphony Part 3 by Muse
2015–16	Sing, Sing, Sing by Louis Prima	Skyfall by Thomas Newman

== Competitive highlights ==
- GP – Event of the ISU Grand Prix Series
- CS – Event of the ISU Challenger Series

=== Pair skating with Goda Butkutė (for Lithuania) ===
Competition placements at senior level
Season	2012–13	2014–15	2015–16	2016–17
World Championships			17th	22nd
European Championships			11th	18th
Lithuanian Championships	1st	1st	1st	1st
GP Rostelecom Cup				8th
CS Lombardia Trophy			2nd	5th
CS Mordovian Ornament			3rd	
CS Ondrej Nepela Trophy				5th
CS Tallinn Trophy			4th	3rd
CS Warsaw Cup			3rd	
Mentor Cup			2nd	3rd

=== Pair skating with Daria Beklemisheva (for Russia) ===
Competition placements at junior level
Season	2011–12
Russian Championships	10th
