= Aidas Reklys =

Lithuanian figure skater (born 1982)

Aidas Reklys (born 22 April 1982 in Kaunas) is a Lithuanian figure skater who competes in both singles figure skating and ice dancing.

== Career ==
Early in his career, he was the 1999-2006 Lithuanian national champion for singles figure skating. He’s the first skater in Lithuanian history who did the most dangerous element on ice - the backflip. He’s founder and inventor of the training tool Power twist in 2008.

He switched to ice dance after the 2006 season. Aidas Reklys was awarded the Fair Play Award at the Universiade Winter Olympic Games in 1999. He competed in 7 World and 8 European championships. He is a certified USA National and International level Coach.

=== Accomplishments ===
- 8 Time Lithuanian National Men's Champion
- 7 Time World Competitor,
- 8 Time European Championships Competitor,
- 2 Time Baltic Countries Champion,
- Lithuanian National Ice Dance Silver Medalist,
- European and World Ice Dance Competitor,
- Fair Play Award winner at the World Youth Winter Olympic Games.
- USA National and International level coach,
- Founder of Skate Universal

Education:

Bachelor of Science in Physical Education Graduate of the Lithuanian Sports Academy with a degree in Pedagogic Certificated Pilates Instructor
