= 2014–15 ISU Season's World Ranking =

Merit-based ice skating ranking

2014–15 ISU World Standings and Season's World Ranking
Season-end No. 1 skaters
- Men's singles: (Japan) Yuzuru Hanyu
- Ladies' singles: (Russia) Elizaveta Tuktamysheva
- Pairs: (Canada) Meagan Duhamel / Eric Radford
- Ice dance: (Canada) Kaitlyn Weaver / Andrew Poje

Season's No. 1 skaters
- Men's singles: (Spain) Javier Fernandez
- Ladies' singles: (Russia) Elizaveta Tuktamysheva
- Pairs: (Canada) Meagan Duhamel / Eric Radford
- Ice dance: (France) Gabriella Papadakis / Guillaume Cizeron

Season-end No. 1 teams
- Senior Synchronized: (Finland) Team Marigold Ice Unity
- Junior Synchronized: (Finland) Team Fintastic Junior

Navigation

The 2014–15 ISU World Standings and Season's World Ranking, are the World Standings and Season's World Ranking published by the International Skating Union (ISU) during the 2014–15 season. The 2014–15 ISU Season's World Ranking is based on the results of the 2014–15 season only.

The remainder of this section is a complete list, by discipline, published by the ISU.

== World Standings for ice dance ==
=== Season-end standings ===
The remainder of this section is a complete list, by discipline, published by the ISU.

==== Ice dance (146 couples) ====
As of 26 April 2015

Rank	Nation	Couple	Points	Season	ISU Championships or Olympics	(Junior) Grand Prix and Final		Selected International Competition	
Rank	Nation	Couple	Points	Season	Best	Best	2nd Best	Best	2nd Best
1	CAN	Kaitlyn Weaver / Andrew Poje	4837	2014/2015 season (100%)	972	800	400	300	0
1	CAN	Kaitlyn Weaver / Andrew Poje	4837	2013/2014 season (100%)	1080	525	360	225	0
1	CAN	Kaitlyn Weaver / Andrew Poje	4837	2012/2013 season (70%)	551	227	227	175	0
2	USA	Madison Chock / Evan Bates	4432	2014/2015 season (100%)	1080	720	400	270	0
2	USA	Madison Chock / Evan Bates	4432	2013/2014 season (100%)	787	324	324	225	0
2	USA	Madison Chock / Evan Bates	4432	2012/2013 season (70%)	476	204	0	175	127
3	USA	Meryl Davis / Charlie White	4330	2014/2015 season (100%)	0	0	0	0	0
3	USA	Meryl Davis / Charlie White	4330	2013/2014 season (100%)	1200	800	400	250	0
3	USA	Meryl Davis / Charlie White	4330	2012/2013 season (70%)	840	560	280	0	0
4	CAN	Tessa Virtue / Scott Moir	3990	2014/2015 season (100%)	0	0	0	0	0
4	CAN	Tessa Virtue / Scott Moir	3990	2013/2014 season (100%)	1080	720	400	250	0
4	CAN	Tessa Virtue / Scott Moir	3990	2012/2013 season (70%)	756	504	280	0	0
5	FRA	Gabriella Papadakis / Guillaume Cizeron	3802	2014/2015 season (100%)	1200	648	400	300	0
5	FRA	Gabriella Papadakis / Guillaume Cizeron	3802	2013/2014 season (100%)	339	262	213	250	182
5	FRA	Gabriella Papadakis / Guillaume Cizeron	3802	2012/2013 season (70%)	315	221	175	0	0
6	ITA	Anna Cappellini / Luca Lanotte	3797	2014/2015 season (100%)	875	324	0	0	0
6	ITA	Anna Cappellini / Luca Lanotte	3797	2013/2014 season (100%)	1200	472	360	0	0
6	ITA	Anna Cappellini / Luca Lanotte	3797	2012/2013 season (70%)	613	408	252	158	0
7	USA	Maia Shibutani / Alex Shibutani	3687	2014/2015 season (100%)	787	583	360	300	300
7	USA	Maia Shibutani / Alex Shibutani	3687	2013/2014 season (100%)	709	324	324	0	0
7	USA	Maia Shibutani / Alex Shibutani	3687	2012/2013 season (70%)	428	227	204	0	0
8	RUS	Ekaterina Bobrova / Dmitri Soloviev	3495	2014/2015 season (100%)	0	0	0	0	0
8	RUS	Ekaterina Bobrova / Dmitri Soloviev	3495	2013/2014 season (100%)	787	583	400	250	0
8	RUS	Ekaterina Bobrova / Dmitri Soloviev	3495	2012/2013 season (70%)	680	368	252	175	0
9	CAN	Piper Gilles / Paul Poirier	3293	2014/2015 season (100%)	709	525	360	270	0
9	CAN	Piper Gilles / Paul Poirier	3293	2013/2014 season (100%)	756	262	236	0	0
9	CAN	Piper Gilles / Paul Poirier	3293	2012/2013 season (70%)	386	204	165	175	0
10	USA	Madison Hubbell / Zachary Donohue	3261	2014/2015 season (100%)	465	324	324	300	0
10	USA	Madison Hubbell / Zachary Donohue	3261	2013/2014 season (100%)	840	324	292	250	0
10	USA	Madison Hubbell / Zachary Donohue	3261	2012/2013 season (70%)	0	204	183	142	0
11	GBR	Penny Coomes / Nicholas Buckland	2955	2014/2015 season (100%)	0	324	262	250	250
11	GBR	Penny Coomes / Nicholas Buckland	2955	2013/2014 season (100%)	680	213	0	250	164
11	GBR	Penny Coomes / Nicholas Buckland	2955	2012/2013 season (70%)	386	165	149	175	0
12	GER	Nelli Zhiganshina / Alexander Gazsi	2887	2014/2015 season (100%)	446	292	262	270	243
12	GER	Nelli Zhiganshina / Alexander Gazsi	2887	2013/2014 season (100%)	446	292	236	225	164
12	GER	Nelli Zhiganshina / Alexander Gazsi	2887	2012/2013 season (70%)	347	183	183	175	142
13	ITA	Charlene Guignard / Marco Fabbri	2807	2014/2015 season (100%)	496	262	236	270	270
13	ITA	Charlene Guignard / Marco Fabbri	2807	2013/2014 season (100%)	402	213	0	250	225
13	ITA	Charlene Guignard / Marco Fabbri	2807	2012/2013 season (70%)	253	183	0	175	142
14	RUS	Ksenia Monko / Kirill Khaliavin	2577	2014/2015 season (100%)	574	360	292	250	0
14	RUS	Ksenia Monko / Kirill Khaliavin	2577	2013/2014 season (100%)	0	262	236	225	203
14	RUS	Ksenia Monko / Kirill Khaliavin	2577	2012/2013 season (70%)	0	165	0	175	127
15	CAN	Alexandra Paul / Mitchell Islam	2416	2014/2015 season (100%)	496	262	236	219	0
15	CAN	Alexandra Paul / Mitchell Islam	2416	2013/2014 season (100%)	465	262	0	203	0
15	CAN	Alexandra Paul / Mitchell Islam	2416	2012/2013 season (70%)	0	0	0	158	115
16	USA	Kaitlin Hawayek / Jean-Luc Baker	2395	2014/2015 season (100%)	551	324	236	219	0
16	USA	Kaitlin Hawayek / Jean-Luc Baker	2395	2013/2014 season (100%)	500	315	250	0	0
16	USA	Kaitlin Hawayek / Jean-Luc Baker	2395	2012/2013 season (70%)	186	158	115	0	0
17	RUS	Alexandra Stepanova / Ivan Bukin	2352	2014/2015 season (100%)	680	324	262	300	0
17	RUS	Alexandra Stepanova / Ivan Bukin	2352	2013/2014 season (100%)	0	191	0	0	0
17	RUS	Alexandra Stepanova / Ivan Bukin	2352	2012/2013 season (70%)	350	245	175	0	0
18	CAN	Nicole Orford / Thomas Williams	2269	2014/2015 season (100%)	0	191	0	270	178
18	CAN	Nicole Orford / Thomas Williams	2269	2013/2014 season (100%)	551	191	0	203	0
18	CAN	Nicole Orford / Thomas Williams	2269	2012/2013 season (70%)	347	204	134	0	0
19	ESP	Sara Hurtado / Adria Diaz	2203	2014/2015 season (100%)	551	292	191	243	198
19	ESP	Sara Hurtado / Adria Diaz	2203	2013/2014 season (100%)	339	0	0	225	164
19	ESP	Sara Hurtado / Adria Diaz	2203	2012/2013 season (70%)	134	0	0	158	0
20	USA	Alexandra Aldridge / Daniel Eaton	2174	2014/2015 season (100%)	0	236	213	300	0
20	USA	Alexandra Aldridge / Daniel Eaton	2174	2013/2014 season (100%)	680	262	0	0	0
20	USA	Alexandra Aldridge / Daniel Eaton	2174	2012/2013 season (70%)	284	199	175	0	0
21	AZE	Julia Zlobina / Alexei Sitnikov	2163	2014/2015 season (100%)	0	0	0	0	0
21	AZE	Julia Zlobina / Alexei Sitnikov	2163	2013/2014 season (100%)	496	191	0	250	250
21	AZE	Julia Zlobina / Alexei Sitnikov	2163	2012/2013 season (70%)	312	183	165	158	158
22	RUS	Anna Yanovskaya / Sergey Mozgov	2150	2014/2015 season (100%)	500	350	250	0	0
22	RUS	Anna Yanovskaya / Sergey Mozgov	2150	2013/2014 season (100%)	450	350	250	0	0
22	RUS	Anna Yanovskaya / Sergey Mozgov	2150	2012/2013 season (70%)	0	178	158	0	0
23	UKR	Alexandra Nazarova / Maxim Nikitin	2062	2014/2015 season (100%)	405	203	182	270	219
23	UKR	Alexandra Nazarova / Maxim Nikitin	2062	2013/2014 season (100%)	328	230	225	0	0
23	UKR	Alexandra Nazarova / Maxim Nikitin	2062	2012/2013 season (70%)	122	115	115	0	0
24	JPN	Cathy Reed / Chris Reed	1927	2014/2015 season (100%)	0	236	0	182	0
24	JPN	Cathy Reed / Chris Reed	1927	2013/2014 season (100%)	200	262	236	0	0
24	JPN	Cathy Reed / Chris Reed	1927	2012/2013 season (70%)	312	183	0	158	158
25	SVK	Federica Testa / Lukáš Csölley	1843	2014/2015 season (100%)	402	213	0	300	300
25	SVK	Federica Testa / Lukáš Csölley	1843	2013/2014 season (100%)	264	0	0	182	182
25	SVK	Federica Testa / Lukáš Csölley	1843	2012/2013 season (70%)	109	0	0	127	115
26	USA	Lorraine McNamara / Quinn Carpenter	1777	2014/2015 season (100%)	450	225	203	0	0
26	USA	Lorraine McNamara / Quinn Carpenter	1777	2013/2014 season (100%)	365	284	250	0	0
26	USA	Lorraine McNamara / Quinn Carpenter	1777	2012/2013 season (70%)	151	127	104	0	0
27	FRA	Pernelle Carron / Lloyd Jones	1750	2014/2015 season (100%)	0	0	0	0	0
27	FRA	Pernelle Carron / Lloyd Jones	1750	2013/2014 season (100%)	275	292	236	225	0
27	FRA	Pernelle Carron / Lloyd Jones	1750	2012/2013 season (70%)	264	149	134	175	0
28	KOR	Rebeka Kim / Kirill Minov	1650	2014/2015 season (100%)	362	213	191	243	0
28	KOR	Rebeka Kim / Kirill Minov	1650	2013/2014 season (100%)	295	182	164	0	0
28	KOR	Rebeka Kim / Kirill Minov	1650	2012/2013 season (70%)	48	68	0	0	0
29	CAN	Madeline Edwards / Zhao Kai Pang	1608	2014/2015 season (100%)	295	250	230	0	0
29	CAN	Madeline Edwards / Zhao Kai Pang	1608	2013/2014 season (100%)	405	225	203	0	0
29	CAN	Madeline Edwards / Zhao Kai Pang	1608	2012/2013 season (70%)	110	142	142	0	0
30	CHN	Wang Shiyue / Liu Xinyu	1537	2014/2015 season (100%)	446	236	0	250	243
30	CHN	Wang Shiyue / Liu Xinyu	1537	2013/2014 season (100%)	362	0	0	0	0
30	CHN	Wang Shiyue / Liu Xinyu	1537	2012/2013 season (70%)	0	0	0	0	0
31	DEN	Laurence Fournier Beaudry / Nikolaj Sørensen	1499	2014/2015 season (100%)	418	0	0	270	243
31	DEN	Laurence Fournier Beaudry / Nikolaj Sørensen	1499	2013/2014 season (100%)	140	0	0	225	203
31	DEN	Laurence Fournier Beaudry / Nikolaj Sørensen	1499	2012/2013 season (70%)	0	0	0	0	0
32	USA	Rachel Parsons / Michael Parsons	1482	2014/2015 season (100%)	365	225	203	0	0
32	USA	Rachel Parsons / Michael Parsons	1482	2013/2014 season (100%)	239	225	225	0	0
32	USA	Rachel Parsons / Michael Parsons	1482	2012/2013 season (70%)	0	142	104	0	0
33	RUS	Betina Popova / Yuri Vlasenko	1479	2014/2015 season (100%)	174	284	250	0	0
33	RUS	Betina Popova / Yuri Vlasenko	1479	2013/2014 season (100%)	266	255	250	0	0
33	RUS	Betina Popova / Yuri Vlasenko	1479	2012/2013 season (70%)	0	0	0	0	0
34	RUS	Elena Ilinykh / Ruslan Zhiganshin	1470	2014/2015 season (100%)	638	472	360	0	0
34	RUS	Elena Ilinykh / Ruslan Zhiganshin	1470	2013/2014 season (100%)	0	0	0	0	0
34	RUS	Elena Ilinykh / Ruslan Zhiganshin	1470	2012/2013 season (70%)	0	0	0	0	0
35	GER	Tanja Kolbe / Stefano Caruso	1462	2014/2015 season (100%)	0	0	0	0	0
35	GER	Tanja Kolbe / Stefano Caruso	1462	2013/2014 season (100%)	293	213	0	203	203
35	GER	Tanja Kolbe / Stefano Caruso	1462	2012/2013 season (70%)	281	0	0	142	127
36	CAN	Mackenzie Bent / Garrett MacKeen	1455	2014/2015 season (100%)	328	255	250	0	0
36	CAN	Mackenzie Bent / Garrett MacKeen	1455	2013/2014 season (100%)	157	250	133	0	0
36	CAN	Mackenzie Bent / Garrett MacKeen	1455	2012/2013 season (70%)	230	142	127	0	0
37	RUS	Evgenia Kosigina / Nikolai Moroshkin	1364	2014/2015 season (100%)	0	0	0	225	219
37	RUS	Evgenia Kosigina / Nikolai Moroshkin	1364	2013/2014 season (100%)	215	182	0	0	0
37	RUS	Evgenia Kosigina / Nikolai Moroshkin	1364	2012/2013 season (70%)	207	158	158	0	0
38	TUR	Alisa Agafonova / Alper Uçar	1308	2014/2015 season (100%)	264	0	0	225	225
38	TUR	Alisa Agafonova / Alper Uçar	1308	2013/2014 season (100%)	162	0	0	225	203
38	TUR	Alisa Agafonova / Alper Uçar	1308	2012/2013 season (70%)	166	0	0	127	115
39	EST	Irina Shtork / Taavi Rand	1186	2014/2015 season (100%)	237	0	0	182	164
39	EST	Irina Shtork / Taavi Rand	1186	2013/2014 season (100%)	214	0	0	225	164
39	EST	Irina Shtork / Taavi Rand	1186	2012/2013 season (70%)	205	0	0	158	142
40	USA	Anastasia Cannuscio / Colin McManus	1147	2014/2015 season (100%)	0	262	0	243	243
40	USA	Anastasia Cannuscio / Colin McManus	1147	2013/2014 season (100%)	0	0	0	250	0
40	USA	Anastasia Cannuscio / Colin McManus	1147	2012/2013 season (70%)	0	149	0	0	0
41	UKR	Siobhan Heekin-Canedy / Dmitri Dun	1104	2014/2015 season (100%)	0	0	0	0	0
41	UKR	Siobhan Heekin-Canedy / Dmitri Dun	1104	2013/2014 season (100%)	0	191	0	203	164
41	UKR	Siobhan Heekin-Canedy / Dmitri Dun	1104	2012/2013 season (70%)	213	0	0	175	158
42	HUN	Carolina Moscheni / Ádám Lukács	1005	2014/2015 season (100%)	215	203	164	0	0
42	HUN	Carolina Moscheni / Ádám Lukács	1005	2013/2014 season (100%)	127	148	148	0	0
42	HUN	Carolina Moscheni / Ádám Lukács	1005	2012/2013 season (70%)	0	0	0	0	0
43	AUS	Danielle O'Brien / Gregory Merriman	996	2014/2015 season (100%)	0	0	0	0	0
43	AUS	Danielle O'Brien / Gregory Merriman	996	2013/2014 season (100%)	446	0	0	0	0
43	AUS	Danielle O'Brien / Gregory Merriman	996	2012/2013 season (70%)	281	0	0	142	127
44	BLR	Viktoria Kavaliova / Yurii Bieliaiev	975	2014/2015 season (100%)	0	0	0	270	203
44	BLR	Viktoria Kavaliova / Yurii Bieliaiev	975	2013/2014 season (100%)	114	164	148	0	0
44	BLR	Viktoria Kavaliova / Yurii Bieliaiev	975	2012/2013 season (70%)	0	76	0	0	0
45	RUS	Alla Loboda / Pavel Drozd	971	2014/2015 season (100%)	0	315	250	0	0
45	RUS	Alla Loboda / Pavel Drozd	971	2013/2014 season (100%)	0	203	203	0	0
45	RUS	Alla Loboda / Pavel Drozd	971	2012/2013 season (70%)	0	0	0	0	0
46	RUS	Sofia Evdokimova / Egor Bazin	943	2014/2015 season (100%)	194	182	182	0	0
46	RUS	Sofia Evdokimova / Egor Bazin	943	2013/2014 season (100%)	0	203	182	0	0
46	RUS	Sofia Evdokimova / Egor Bazin	943	2012/2013 season (70%)	0	115	93	0	0
47	FIN	Olesia Karmi / Max Lindholm	923	2014/2015 season (100%)	126	0	0	203	178
47	FIN	Olesia Karmi / Max Lindholm	923	2013/2014 season (100%)	0	0	0	164	164
47	FIN	Olesia Karmi / Max Lindholm	923	2012/2013 season (70%)	88	0	0	0	0
48	FIN	Henna Lindholm / Ossi Kanervo	918	2014/2015 season (100%)	0	0	0	219	219
48	FIN	Henna Lindholm / Ossi Kanervo	918	2013/2014 season (100%)	113	0	0	203	164
48	FIN	Henna Lindholm / Ossi Kanervo	918	2012/2013 season (70%)	0	0	0	0	0
49	GBR	Olivia Smart / Joseph Buckland	910	2014/2015 season (100%)	0	0	0	225	225
49	GBR	Olivia Smart / Joseph Buckland	910	2013/2014 season (100%)	194	133	133	0	0
49	GBR	Olivia Smart / Joseph Buckland	910	2012/2013 season (70%)	0	0	0	0	0
50	CHN	Zhang Yiyi / Wu Nan	886	2014/2015 season (100%)	0	213	0	0	0
50	CHN	Zhang Yiyi / Wu Nan	886	2013/2014 season (100%)	402	213	0	0	0
50	CHN	Zhang Yiyi / Wu Nan	886	2012/2013 season (70%)	58	0	0	0	0
50	JPN	Emi Hirai / Marien De La Asuncion	886	2014/2015 season (100%)	402	191	0	0	0
50	JPN	Emi Hirai / Marien De La Asuncion	886	2013/2014 season (100%)	293	0	0	0	0
50	JPN	Emi Hirai / Marien De La Asuncion	886	2012/2013 season (70%)	205	0	0	0	0
52	RUS	Ekaterina Pushkash / Jonathan Guerreiro	875	2014/2015 season (100%)	0	0	0	0	0
52	RUS	Ekaterina Pushkash / Jonathan Guerreiro	875	2013/2014 season (100%)	0	0	0	250	203
52	RUS	Ekaterina Pushkash / Jonathan Guerreiro	875	2012/2013 season (70%)	0	149	0	158	115
53	CAN	Elisabeth Paradis / Francois-Xavier Ouellette	867	2014/2015 season (100%)	0	292	213	198	0
53	CAN	Elisabeth Paradis / Francois-Xavier Ouellette	867	2013/2014 season (100%)	0	0	0	164	0
53	CAN	Elisabeth Paradis / Francois-Xavier Ouellette	867	2012/2013 season (70%)	0	0	0	0	0
54	RUS	Daria Morozova / Mikhail Zhirnov	863	2014/2015 season (100%)	0	250	207	0	0
54	RUS	Daria Morozova / Mikhail Zhirnov	863	2013/2014 season (100%)	0	203	203	0	0
54	RUS	Daria Morozova / Mikhail Zhirnov	863	2012/2013 season (70%)	0	142	127	0	0
55	CZE	Cortney Mansour / Michal Ceska	822	2014/2015 season (100%)	156	0	0	225	203
55	CZE	Cortney Mansour / Michal Ceska	822	2013/2014 season (100%)	141	97	0	0	0
55	CZE	Cortney Mansour / Michal Ceska	822	2012/2013 season (70%)	0	0	0	0	0
56	FRA	Angelique Abachkina / Louis Thauron	805	2014/2015 season (100%)	239	133	133	0	0
56	FRA	Angelique Abachkina / Louis Thauron	805	2013/2014 season (100%)	83	120	97	0	0
56	FRA	Angelique Abachkina / Louis Thauron	805	2012/2013 season (70%)	0	0	0	0	0
57	ISR	Allison Reed / Vasili Rogov	778	2014/2015 season (100%)	173	0	0	225	198
57	ISR	Allison Reed / Vasili Rogov	778	2013/2014 season (100%)	0	0	0	182	0
57	ISR	Allison Reed / Vasili Rogov	778	2012/2013 season (70%)	0	0	0	0	0
58	CHN	Yu Xiaoyang / Wang Chen	757	2014/2015 season (100%)	0	0	0	0	0
58	CHN	Yu Xiaoyang / Wang Chen	757	2013/2014 season (100%)	0	236	0	0	0
58	CHN	Yu Xiaoyang / Wang Chen	757	2012/2013 season (70%)	253	134	134	0	0
59	RUS	Valeria Zenkova / Valerie Sinitsin	756	2014/2015 season (100%)	0	0	0	0	0
59	RUS	Valeria Zenkova / Valerie Sinitsin	756	2013/2014 season (100%)	0	0	0	164	0
59	RUS	Valeria Zenkova / Valerie Sinitsin	756	2012/2013 season (70%)	256	175	161	0	0
59	CAN	Brianna Delmaestro / Timothy Lum	756	2014/2015 season (100%)	0	225	203	0	0
59	CAN	Brianna Delmaestro / Timothy Lum	756	2013/2014 season (100%)	0	164	164	0	0
59	CAN	Brianna Delmaestro / Timothy Lum	756	2012/2013 season (70%)	0	0	0	0	0
61	AUT	Barbora Silná / Juri Kurakin	748	2014/2015 season (100%)	140	0	0	250	243
61	AUT	Barbora Silná / Juri Kurakin	748	2013/2014 season (100%)	0	0	0	0	0
61	AUT	Barbora Silná / Juri Kurakin	748	2012/2013 season (70%)	0	0	0	115	0
62	POL	Justyna Plutowska / Peter Gerber	741	2014/2015 season (100%)	0	0	0	0	0
62	POL	Justyna Plutowska / Peter Gerber	741	2013/2014 season (100%)	173	0	0	250	203
62	POL	Justyna Plutowska / Peter Gerber	741	2012/2013 season (70%)	0	0	0	115	0
63	USA	Holly Moore / Daniel Klaber	736	2014/2015 season (100%)	0	203	148	0	0
63	USA	Holly Moore / Daniel Klaber	736	2013/2014 season (100%)	0	203	182	0	0
63	USA	Holly Moore / Daniel Klaber	736	2012/2013 season (70%)	0	84	0	0	0
64	MEX	Pilar Maekawa Moreno / Leonardo Maekawa Moreno	728	2014/2015 season (100%)	293	0	0	198	0
64	MEX	Pilar Maekawa Moreno / Leonardo Maekawa Moreno	728	2013/2014 season (100%)	237	0	0	0	0
64	MEX	Pilar Maekawa Moreno / Leonardo Maekawa Moreno	728	2012/2013 season (70%)	166	0	0	0	0
65	POL	Natalia Kaliszek / Maksim Spodirev	719	2014/2015 season (100%)	266	0	0	250	203
65	POL	Natalia Kaliszek / Maksim Spodirev	719	2013/2014 season (100%)	0	0	0	0	0
65	POL	Natalia Kaliszek / Maksim Spodirev	719	2012/2013 season (70%)	0	0	0	0	0
66	UKR	Valeria Gaistruk / Alexei Olejnik	683	2014/2015 season (100%)	127	164	164	0	0
66	UKR	Valeria Gaistruk / Alexei Olejnik	683	2013/2014 season (100%)	0	120	108	0	0
66	UKR	Valeria Gaistruk / Alexei Olejnik	683	2012/2013 season (70%)	0	0	0	0	0
67	GER	Shari Koch / Christian Nüchtern	677	2014/2015 season (100%)	0	0	0	0	0
67	GER	Shari Koch / Christian Nüchtern	677	2013/2014 season (100%)	0	0	0	225	0
67	GER	Shari Koch / Christian Nüchtern	677	2012/2013 season (70%)	167	158	127	0	0
68	CHN	Zhao Yue / Zheng Xun	516	2014/2015 season (100%)	325	191	0	0	0
68	CHN	Zhao Yue / Zheng Xun	516	2013/2014 season (100%)	0	0	0	0	0
68	CHN	Zhao Yue / Zheng Xun	516	2012/2013 season (70%)	0	0	0	0	0
69	UKR	Daria Korotitskaia / Maksim Spodirev	510	2014/2015 season (100%)	0	0	0	0	0
69	UKR	Daria Korotitskaia / Maksim Spodirev	510	2013/2014 season (100%)	0	148	120	0	0
69	UKR	Daria Korotitskaia / Maksim Spodirev	510	2012/2013 season (70%)	0	127	115	0	0
70	RUS	Victoria Sinitsina / Nikita Katsalapov	505	2014/2015 season (100%)	0	292	213	0	0
70	RUS	Victoria Sinitsina / Nikita Katsalapov	505	2013/2014 season (100%)	0	0	0	0	0
70	RUS	Victoria Sinitsina / Nikita Katsalapov	505	2012/2013 season (70%)	0	0	0	0	0
71	KOR	Yura Min / Timothy Koleto	489	2014/2015 season (100%)	0	0	0	164	0
71	KOR	Yura Min / Timothy Koleto	489	2013/2014 season (100%)	325	0	0	0	0
71	KOR	Yura Min / Timothy Koleto	489	2012/2013 season (70%)	0	0	0	0	0
72	ITA	Misato Komatsubara / Andrea Fabbri	453	2014/2015 season (100%)	0	0	0	250	203
72	ITA	Misato Komatsubara / Andrea Fabbri	453	2013/2014 season (100%)	0	0	0	0	0
72	ITA	Misato Komatsubara / Andrea Fabbri	453	2012/2013 season (70%)	0	0	0	0	0
73	GER	Ria Schiffner / Julian Salatzki	452	2014/2015 season (100%)	0	0	0	0	0
73	GER	Ria Schiffner / Julian Salatzki	452	2013/2014 season (100%)	103	120	108	0	0
73	GER	Ria Schiffner / Julian Salatzki	452	2012/2013 season (70%)	53	68	0	0	0
74	KAZ	Ksenia Korobkova / Daryn Zhunussov	446	2014/2015 season (100%)	0	0	0	0	0
74	KAZ	Ksenia Korobkova / Daryn Zhunussov	446	2013/2014 season (100%)	264	0	0	182	0
74	KAZ	Ksenia Korobkova / Daryn Zhunussov	446	2012/2013 season (70%)	0	0	0	0	0
75	CAN	Danielle Wu / Spencer Soo	432	2014/2015 season (100%)	0	148	120	0	0
75	CAN	Danielle Wu / Spencer Soo	432	2013/2014 season (100%)	0	164	0	0	0
75	CAN	Danielle Wu / Spencer Soo	432	2012/2013 season (70%)	0	0	0	0	0
76	ITA	Sofia Sforza / Leo Luca Sforza	429	2014/2015 season (100%)	83	0	0	182	164
76	ITA	Sofia Sforza / Leo Luca Sforza	429	2013/2014 season (100%)	0	0	0	0	0
76	ITA	Sofia Sforza / Leo Luca Sforza	429	2012/2013 season (70%)	0	0	0	0	0
77	KAZ	Karina Uzurova / Ilias Ali	425	2014/2015 season (100%)	264	0	0	0	0
77	KAZ	Karina Uzurova / Ilias Ali	425	2013/2014 season (100%)	0	0	0	0	0
77	KAZ	Karina Uzurova / Ilias Ali	425	2012/2013 season (70%)	0	93	68	0	0
77	USA	Elliana Pogrebinsky / Alex Benoit	425	2014/2015 season (100%)	141	164	120	0	0
77	USA	Elliana Pogrebinsky / Alex Benoit	425	2013/2014 season (100%)	0	0	0	0	0
77	USA	Elliana Pogrebinsky / Alex Benoit	425	2012/2013 season (70%)	0	0	0	0	0
79	GER	Katharina Müller / Tim Dieck	410	2014/2015 season (100%)	157	133	120	0	0
79	GER	Katharina Müller / Tim Dieck	410	2013/2014 season (100%)	0	0	0	0	0
79	GER	Katharina Müller / Tim Dieck	410	2012/2013 season (70%)	0	0	0	0	0
80	FRA	Sarah Marine Rouffanche / Geoffrey Brissaud	382	2014/2015 season (100%)	114	148	120	0	0
80	FRA	Sarah Marine Rouffanche / Geoffrey Brissaud	382	2013/2014 season (100%)	0	0	0	0	0
80	FRA	Sarah Marine Rouffanche / Geoffrey Brissaud	382	2012/2013 season (70%)	0	0	0	0	0
81	HUN	Zsuzsanna Nagy / Mate Fejes	378	2014/2015 season (100%)	0	0	0	0	0
81	HUN	Zsuzsanna Nagy / Mate Fejes	378	2013/2014 season (100%)	0	0	0	0	0
81	HUN	Zsuzsanna Nagy / Mate Fejes	378	2012/2013 season (70%)	121	0	0	142	115
82	TUR	Cagla Demirsal / Berk Akalin	373	2014/2015 season (100%)	0	0	0	0	0
82	TUR	Cagla Demirsal / Berk Akalin	373	2013/2014 season (100%)	93	0	0	0	0
82	TUR	Cagla Demirsal / Berk Akalin	373	2012/2013 season (70%)	89	115	76	0	0
83	ARM	Tina Garabedian / Alexandre Laliberte	369	2014/2015 season (100%)	103	133	133	0	0
83	ARM	Tina Garabedian / Alexandre Laliberte	369	2013/2014 season (100%)	0	0	0	0	0
83	ARM	Tina Garabedian / Alexandre Laliberte	369	2012/2013 season (70%)	0	0	0	0	0
84	RUS	Eva Khachaturian / Andrei Bagin	364	2014/2015 season (100%)	0	182	182	0	0
84	RUS	Eva Khachaturian / Andrei Bagin	364	2013/2014 season (100%)	0	0	0	0	0
84	RUS	Eva Khachaturian / Andrei Bagin	364	2012/2013 season (70%)	0	0	0	0	0
85	CAN	Melinda Meng / Andrew Meng	357	2014/2015 season (100%)	0	133	0	0	0
85	CAN	Melinda Meng / Andrew Meng	357	2013/2014 season (100%)	0	120	0	0	0
85	CAN	Melinda Meng / Andrew Meng	357	2012/2013 season (70%)	0	104	0	0	0
86	USA	Christina Carreira / Anthony Ponomarenko	346	2014/2015 season (100%)	0	182	164	0	0
86	USA	Christina Carreira / Anthony Ponomarenko	346	2013/2014 season (100%)	0	0	0	0	0
86	USA	Christina Carreira / Anthony Ponomarenko	346	2012/2013 season (70%)	0	0	0	0	0
86	FIN	Cecilia Törn / Jussiville Partanen	346	2014/2015 season (100%)	0	0	0	182	164
86	FIN	Cecilia Törn / Jussiville Partanen	346	2013/2014 season (100%)	0	0	0	0	0
86	FIN	Cecilia Törn / Jussiville Partanen	346	2012/2013 season (70%)	0	0	0	0	0
88	USA	Chloe Lewis / Logan Bye	328	2014/2015 season (100%)	0	164	0	0	0
88	USA	Chloe Lewis / Logan Bye	328	2013/2014 season (100%)	0	164	0	0	0
88	USA	Chloe Lewis / Logan Bye	328	2012/2013 season (70%)	0	0	0	0	0
89	GRE	Carina Glastris / Nicholas Lettner	313	2014/2015 season (100%)	0	0	0	0	0
89	GRE	Carina Glastris / Nicholas Lettner	313	2013/2014 season (100%)	68	148	97	0	0
89	GRE	Carina Glastris / Nicholas Lettner	313	2012/2013 season (70%)	0	0	0	0	0
90	USA	Julia Biechler / Damian Dodge	312	2014/2015 season (100%)	0	164	148	0	0
90	USA	Julia Biechler / Damian Dodge	312	2013/2014 season (100%)	0	0	0	0	0
90	USA	Julia Biechler / Damian Dodge	312	2012/2013 season (70%)	0	0	0	0	0
90	CAN	Marieve Cyr / Benjamin Brisebois Gaudreau	312	2014/2015 season (100%)	0	0	0	219	0
90	CAN	Marieve Cyr / Benjamin Brisebois Gaudreau	312	2013/2014 season (100%)	0	0	0	0	0
90	CAN	Marieve Cyr / Benjamin Brisebois Gaudreau	312	2012/2013 season (70%)	0	93	0	0	0
92	RUS	Anastasia Shpilevaya / Grigory Smirnov	311	2014/2015 season (100%)	0	203	108	0	0
92	RUS	Anastasia Shpilevaya / Grigory Smirnov	311	2013/2014 season (100%)	0	0	0	0	0
92	RUS	Anastasia Shpilevaya / Grigory Smirnov	311	2012/2013 season (70%)	0	0	0	0	0
93	RUS	Valeria Starygina / Ivan Volobuiev	300	2014/2015 season (100%)	0	0	0	0	0
93	RUS	Valeria Starygina / Ivan Volobuiev	300	2013/2014 season (100%)	0	0	0	0	0
93	RUS	Valeria Starygina / Ivan Volobuiev	300	2012/2013 season (70%)	0	0	0	158	142
94	CAN	Andreanne Poulin / Marc-Andre Servant	284	2014/2015 season (100%)	0	0	0	0	0
94	CAN	Andreanne Poulin / Marc-Andre Servant	284	2013/2014 season (100%)	0	0	0	0	0
94	CAN	Andreanne Poulin / Marc-Andre Servant	284	2012/2013 season (70%)	0	142	142	0	0
95	CAN	Audrey Croteau-Villeneuve / Jeff Hough	281	2014/2015 season (100%)	0	148	133	0	0
95	CAN	Audrey Croteau-Villeneuve / Jeff Hough	281	2013/2014 season (100%)	0	0	0	0	0
95	CAN	Audrey Croteau-Villeneuve / Jeff Hough	281	2012/2013 season (70%)	0	0	0	0	0
95	ITA	Sara Ghislandi / Giona Terzo Ortenzi	281	2014/2015 season (100%)	0	148	0	0	0
95	ITA	Sara Ghislandi / Giona Terzo Ortenzi	281	2013/2014 season (100%)	0	133	0	0	0
95	ITA	Sara Ghislandi / Giona Terzo Ortenzi	281	2012/2013 season (70%)	0	0	0	0	0
97	GEO	Angelina Telegina / Otar Japaridze	261	2014/2015 season (100%)	0	0	0	0	0
97	GEO	Angelina Telegina / Otar Japaridze	261	2013/2014 season (100%)	0	0	0	182	0
97	GEO	Angelina Telegina / Otar Japaridze	261	2012/2013 season (70%)	79	0	0	0	0
98	GBR	Charlotte Aiken / Josh Whidborne	257	2014/2015 season (100%)	0	0	0	0	0
98	GBR	Charlotte Aiken / Josh Whidborne	257	2013/2014 season (100%)	0	0	0	0	0
98	GBR	Charlotte Aiken / Josh Whidborne	257	2012/2013 season (70%)	0	0	0	142	115
99	SUI	Ramona Elsener / Florian Roost	240	2014/2015 season (100%)	0	0	0	0	0
99	SUI	Ramona Elsener / Florian Roost	240	2013/2014 season (100%)	0	0	0	0	0
99	SUI	Ramona Elsener / Florian Roost	240	2012/2013 season (70%)	98	0	0	142	0
100	CZE	Nicole Kuzmich / Alexandr Sinicyn	216	2014/2015 season (100%)	0	108	108	0	0
100	CZE	Nicole Kuzmich / Alexandr Sinicyn	216	2013/2014 season (100%)	0	0	0	0	0
100	CZE	Nicole Kuzmich / Alexandr Sinicyn	216	2012/2013 season (70%)	0	0	0	0	0
101	UKR	Lolita Yermak / Alexei Shumski	203	2014/2015 season (100%)	0	0	0	203	0
101	UKR	Lolita Yermak / Alexei Shumski	203	2013/2014 season (100%)	0	0	0	0	0
101	UKR	Lolita Yermak / Alexei Shumski	203	2012/2013 season (70%)	0	0	0	0	0
101	FRA	Laureline Aubry / Kevin Bellingard	203	2014/2015 season (100%)	0	0	0	203	0
101	FRA	Laureline Aubry / Kevin Bellingard	203	2013/2014 season (100%)	0	0	0	0	0
101	FRA	Laureline Aubry / Kevin Bellingard	203	2012/2013 season (70%)	0	0	0	0	0
103	BLR	Eugenia Tkachenka / Yuri Hulitski	201	2014/2015 season (100%)	93	108	0	0	0
103	BLR	Eugenia Tkachenka / Yuri Hulitski	201	2013/2014 season (100%)	0	0	0	0	0
103	BLR	Eugenia Tkachenka / Yuri Hulitski	201	2012/2013 season (70%)	0	0	0	0	0
104	LAT	Olga Jakushina / Andrey Nevskiy	198	2014/2015 season (100%)	0	0	0	198	0
104	LAT	Olga Jakushina / Andrey Nevskiy	198	2013/2014 season (100%)	0	0	0	0	0
104	LAT	Olga Jakushina / Andrey Nevskiy	198	2012/2013 season (70%)	0	0	0	0	0
105	AUT	Christine Smith / Simon Eisenbauer	194	2014/2015 season (100%)	0	97	97	0	0
105	AUT	Christine Smith / Simon Eisenbauer	194	2013/2014 season (100%)	0	0	0	0	0
105	AUT	Christine Smith / Simon Eisenbauer	194	2012/2013 season (70%)	0	0	0	0	0
106	JPN	Bryna Oi / Taiyo Mizutani	185	2014/2015 season (100%)	0	0	0	0	0
106	JPN	Bryna Oi / Taiyo Mizutani	185	2013/2014 season (100%)	0	0	0	0	0
106	JPN	Bryna Oi / Taiyo Mizutani	185	2012/2013 season (70%)	185	0	0	0	0
107	POL	Beatrice Tomczak / Damian Binkowski	182	2014/2015 season (100%)	0	0	0	182	0
107	POL	Beatrice Tomczak / Damian Binkowski	182	2013/2014 season (100%)	0	0	0	0	0
107	POL	Beatrice Tomczak / Damian Binkowski	182	2012/2013 season (70%)	0	0	0	0	0
107	ITA	Federica Bernardi / Saverio Giacomelli	182	2014/2015 season (100%)	0	0	0	182	0
107	ITA	Federica Bernardi / Saverio Giacomelli	182	2013/2014 season (100%)	0	0	0	0	0
107	ITA	Federica Bernardi / Saverio Giacomelli	182	2012/2013 season (70%)	0	0	0	0	0
109	GEO	Tatiana Kozmava / Aleksandr Zolotarev	178	2014/2015 season (100%)	0	0	0	178	0
109	GEO	Tatiana Kozmava / Aleksandr Zolotarev	178	2013/2014 season (100%)	0	0	0	0	0
109	GEO	Tatiana Kozmava / Aleksandr Zolotarev	178	2012/2013 season (70%)	0	0	0	0	0
110	CHN	Zhao Yue / Liu Chang	172	2014/2015 season (100%)	0	0	0	0	0
110	CHN	Zhao Yue / Liu Chang	172	2013/2014 season (100%)	75	97	0	0	0
110	CHN	Zhao Yue / Liu Chang	172	2012/2013 season (70%)	0	0	0	0	0
111	FRA	Lorenza Alessandrini / Pierre Souquet	164	2014/2015 season (100%)	0	0	0	164	0
111	FRA	Lorenza Alessandrini / Pierre Souquet	164	2013/2014 season (100%)	0	0	0	0	0
111	FRA	Lorenza Alessandrini / Pierre Souquet	164	2012/2013 season (70%)	0	0	0	0	0
111	UKR	Nadezhda Frolenkova / Vitali Nikiforov	164	2014/2015 season (100%)	0	0	0	0	0
111	UKR	Nadezhda Frolenkova / Vitali Nikiforov	164	2013/2014 season (100%)	0	0	0	164	0
111	UKR	Nadezhda Frolenkova / Vitali Nikiforov	164	2012/2013 season (70%)	0	0	0	0	0
111	UKR	Anastasia Galyeta / Avidan Brown	164	2014/2015 season (100%)	0	0	0	0	0
111	UKR	Anastasia Galyeta / Avidan Brown	164	2013/2014 season (100%)	0	0	0	164	0
111	UKR	Anastasia Galyeta / Avidan Brown	164	2012/2013 season (70%)	0	0	0	0	0
111	POL	Anna Postrybailo / Edwin Siwkowski	164	2014/2015 season (100%)	0	0	0	164	0
111	POL	Anna Postrybailo / Edwin Siwkowski	164	2013/2014 season (100%)	0	0	0	0	0
111	POL	Anna Postrybailo / Edwin Siwkowski	164	2012/2013 season (70%)	0	0	0	0	0
111	FRA	Peroline Ojardias / Michael Bramante	164	2014/2015 season (100%)	0	0	0	164	0
111	FRA	Peroline Ojardias / Michael Bramante	164	2013/2014 season (100%)	0	0	0	0	0
111	FRA	Peroline Ojardias / Michael Bramante	164	2012/2013 season (70%)	0	0	0	0	0
116	EST	Johanna Allik / Paul Michael Bellantuono	152	2014/2015 season (100%)	0	0	0	0	0
116	EST	Johanna Allik / Paul Michael Bellantuono	152	2013/2014 season (100%)	0	0	0	0	0
116	EST	Johanna Allik / Paul Michael Bellantuono	152	2012/2013 season (70%)	0	84	68	0	0
117	ESP	Celia Robledo / Luis Fenero	148	2014/2015 season (100%)	0	0	0	0	0
117	ESP	Celia Robledo / Luis Fenero	148	2013/2014 season (100%)	0	0	0	0	0
117	ESP	Celia Robledo / Luis Fenero	148	2012/2013 season (70%)	72	76	0	0	0
117	CAN	Lauren Collins / Shane Firus	148	2014/2015 season (100%)	0	148	0	0	0
117	CAN	Lauren Collins / Shane Firus	148	2013/2014 season (100%)	0	0	0	0	0
117	CAN	Lauren Collins / Shane Firus	148	2012/2013 season (70%)	0	0	0	0	0
117	CAN	Carolane Soucisse / Simon Tanguay	148	2014/2015 season (100%)	0	0	0	0	0
117	CAN	Carolane Soucisse / Simon Tanguay	148	2013/2014 season (100%)	0	148	0	0	0
117	CAN	Carolane Soucisse / Simon Tanguay	148	2012/2013 season (70%)	0	0	0	0	0
120	CAN	Katie Desveaux / Dmitre Razgulajevs	133	2014/2015 season (100%)	0	0	0	0	0
120	CAN	Katie Desveaux / Dmitre Razgulajevs	133	2013/2014 season (100%)	0	133	0	0	0
120	CAN	Katie Desveaux / Dmitre Razgulajevs	133	2012/2013 season (70%)	0	0	0	0	0
121	RUS	Kristina Gorshkova / Vitali Butikov	127	2014/2015 season (100%)	0	0	0	0	0
121	RUS	Kristina Gorshkova / Vitali Butikov	127	2013/2014 season (100%)	0	0	0	0	0
121	RUS	Kristina Gorshkova / Vitali Butikov	127	2012/2013 season (70%)	0	0	0	127	0
122	KAZ	Rebecca Dawn Lucas / Temirlan Yerzhanov	120	2014/2015 season (100%)	0	120	0	0	0
122	KAZ	Rebecca Dawn Lucas / Temirlan Yerzhanov	120	2013/2014 season (100%)	0	0	0	0	0
122	KAZ	Rebecca Dawn Lucas / Temirlan Yerzhanov	120	2012/2013 season (70%)	0	0	0	0	0
122	USA	Emily Day / Kevin Leahy	120	2014/2015 season (100%)	0	120	0	0	0
122	USA	Emily Day / Kevin Leahy	120	2013/2014 season (100%)	0	0	0	0	0
122	USA	Emily Day / Kevin Leahy	120	2012/2013 season (70%)	0	0	0	0	0
122	CHN	Li Xibei / Xiang Guangyao	120	2014/2015 season (100%)	0	120	0	0	0
122	CHN	Li Xibei / Xiang Guangyao	120	2013/2014 season (100%)	0	0	0	0	0
122	CHN	Li Xibei / Xiang Guangyao	120	2012/2013 season (70%)	0	0	0	0	0
125	BLR	Lesia Volodenkova / Vitali Vakunov	115	2014/2015 season (100%)	0	0	0	0	0
125	BLR	Lesia Volodenkova / Vitali Vakunov	115	2013/2014 season (100%)	0	0	0	0	0
125	BLR	Lesia Volodenkova / Vitali Vakunov	115	2012/2013 season (70%)	0	0	0	115	0
126	USA	Tory Patsis / Joseph Johnson	108	2014/2015 season (100%)	0	0	0	0	0
126	USA	Tory Patsis / Joseph Johnson	108	2013/2014 season (100%)	0	108	0	0	0
126	USA	Tory Patsis / Joseph Johnson	108	2012/2013 season (70%)	0	0	0	0	0
126	GBR	Sammi Wren / Alexey Shcheptov	108	2014/2015 season (100%)	0	108	0	0	0
126	GBR	Sammi Wren / Alexey Shcheptov	108	2013/2014 season (100%)	0	0	0	0	0
126	GBR	Sammi Wren / Alexey Shcheptov	108	2012/2013 season (70%)	0	0	0	0	0
126	POL	Natalia Kaliszek / Yaroslav Kurbakov	108	2014/2015 season (100%)	0	0	0	0	0
126	POL	Natalia Kaliszek / Yaroslav Kurbakov	108	2013/2014 season (100%)	0	108	0	0	0
126	POL	Natalia Kaliszek / Yaroslav Kurbakov	108	2012/2013 season (70%)	0	0	0	0	0
126	ISR	Kimberly Berkovich / Ronald Zilberberg	108	2014/2015 season (100%)	0	108	0	0	0
126	ISR	Kimberly Berkovich / Ronald Zilberberg	108	2013/2014 season (100%)	0	0	0	0	0
126	ISR	Kimberly Berkovich / Ronald Zilberberg	108	2012/2013 season (70%)	0	0	0	0	0
126	CAN	Valerie Taillefer / Jason Chan	108	2014/2015 season (100%)	0	108	0	0	0
126	CAN	Valerie Taillefer / Jason Chan	108	2013/2014 season (100%)	0	0	0	0	0
126	CAN	Valerie Taillefer / Jason Chan	108	2012/2013 season (70%)	0	0	0	0	0
131	UKR	Anastasia Chiriyatyeva / Sergei Shevchenko	104	2014/2015 season (100%)	0	0	0	0	0
131	UKR	Anastasia Chiriyatyeva / Sergei Shevchenko	104	2013/2014 season (100%)	0	0	0	0	0
131	UKR	Anastasia Chiriyatyeva / Sergei Shevchenko	104	2012/2013 season (70%)	0	104	0	0	0
132	UKR	Maria Golubtsova / Kirill Belobrov	97	2014/2015 season (100%)	0	97	0	0	0
132	UKR	Maria Golubtsova / Kirill Belobrov	97	2013/2014 season (100%)	0	0	0	0	0
132	UKR	Maria Golubtsova / Kirill Belobrov	97	2012/2013 season (70%)	0	0	0	0	0
132	CAN	Hannah Whitley / Elliott Graham	97	2014/2015 season (100%)	0	97	0	0	0
132	CAN	Hannah Whitley / Elliott Graham	97	2013/2014 season (100%)	0	0	0	0	0
132	CAN	Hannah Whitley / Elliott Graham	97	2012/2013 season (70%)	0	0	0	0	0
132	FRA	Julia Wagret / Mathieu Couyras	97	2014/2015 season (100%)	0	97	0	0	0
132	FRA	Julia Wagret / Mathieu Couyras	97	2013/2014 season (100%)	0	0	0	0	0
132	FRA	Julia Wagret / Mathieu Couyras	97	2012/2013 season (70%)	0	0	0	0	0
132	GER	Loreen Geiler / Sven Miersch	97	2014/2015 season (100%)	0	0	0	0	0
132	GER	Loreen Geiler / Sven Miersch	97	2013/2014 season (100%)	0	97	0	0	0
132	GER	Loreen Geiler / Sven Miersch	97	2012/2013 season (70%)	0	0	0	0	0
132	ITA	Valentina Gabusi / Nik Mirzakhani	97	2014/2015 season (100%)	0	97	0	0	0
132	ITA	Valentina Gabusi / Nik Mirzakhani	97	2013/2014 season (100%)	0	0	0	0	0
132	ITA	Valentina Gabusi / Nik Mirzakhani	97	2012/2013 season (70%)	0	0	0	0	0
132	CZE	Katerina Konickova / Matej Lang	97	2014/2015 season (100%)	0	97	0	0	0
132	CZE	Katerina Konickova / Matej Lang	97	2013/2014 season (100%)	0	0	0	0	0
132	CZE	Katerina Konickova / Matej Lang	97	2012/2013 season (70%)	0	0	0	0	0
138	CAN	Victoria Hasegawa / Connor Hasegawa	93	2014/2015 season (100%)	0	0	0	0	0
138	CAN	Victoria Hasegawa / Connor Hasegawa	93	2013/2014 season (100%)	0	0	0	0	0
138	CAN	Victoria Hasegawa / Connor Hasegawa	93	2012/2013 season (70%)	0	93	0	0	0
139	CZE	Jana Cejkova / Alexandr Sinicyn	84	2014/2015 season (100%)	0	0	0	0	0
139	CZE	Jana Cejkova / Alexandr Sinicyn	84	2013/2014 season (100%)	0	0	0	0	0
139	CZE	Jana Cejkova / Alexandr Sinicyn	84	2012/2013 season (70%)	0	84	0	0	0
139	RUS	Maria Simonova / Dmitriy Dragun	84	2014/2015 season (100%)	0	0	0	0	0
139	RUS	Maria Simonova / Dmitriy Dragun	84	2013/2014 season (100%)	0	0	0	0	0
139	RUS	Maria Simonova / Dmitriy Dragun	84	2012/2013 season (70%)	0	84	0	0	0
139	UKR	Lolita Yermak / Alexei Khimich	84	2014/2015 season (100%)	0	0	0	0	0
139	UKR	Lolita Yermak / Alexei Khimich	84	2013/2014 season (100%)	0	0	0	0	0
139	UKR	Lolita Yermak / Alexei Khimich	84	2012/2013 season (70%)	0	84	0	0	0
142	FRA	Magalie Leininger / Maxime Caurel	76	2014/2015 season (100%)	0	0	0	0	0
142	FRA	Magalie Leininger / Maxime Caurel	76	2013/2014 season (100%)	0	0	0	0	0
142	FRA	Magalie Leininger / Maxime Caurel	76	2012/2013 season (70%)	0	76	0	0	0
142	GER	Lisa Enderlein / Hendrik Hilpert	76	2014/2015 season (100%)	0	0	0	0	0
142	GER	Lisa Enderlein / Hendrik Hilpert	76	2013/2014 season (100%)	0	0	0	0	0
142	GER	Lisa Enderlein / Hendrik Hilpert	76	2012/2013 season (70%)	0	76	0	0	0
144	KOR	Ho Jung Lee / Richard Kang In Kam	75	2014/2015 season (100%)	75	0	0	0	0
144	KOR	Ho Jung Lee / Richard Kang In Kam	75	2013/2014 season (100%)	0	0	0	0	0
144	KOR	Ho Jung Lee / Richard Kang In Kam	75	2012/2013 season (70%)	0	0	0	0	0
145	EST	Marina Elias / Denis Koreline	68	2014/2015 season (100%)	68	0	0	0	0
145	EST	Marina Elias / Denis Koreline	68	2013/2014 season (100%)	0	0	0	0	0
145	EST	Marina Elias / Denis Koreline	68	2012/2013 season (70%)	0	0	0	0	0
146	USA	Whitney Miller / Kyle Macmillan	68	2014/2015 season (100%)	0	0	0	0	0
146	USA	Whitney Miller / Kyle Macmillan	68	2013/2014 season (100%)	0	0	0	0	0
146	USA	Whitney Miller / Kyle Macmillan	68	2012/2013 season (70%)	0	68	0	0	0

== Men's singles (136 skaters) ==
As of 28 March 2015

Rank	Nation	Skater	Points	Season	ISU Championships or Olympics	(Junior) Grand Prix and Final		Selected International Competition	
Rank	Nation	Skater	Points	Season	Best	Best	2nd Best	Best	2nd Best
1	ESP	Javier Fernandez	2320	2014/2015 season (100%)	1200	720	400	0	0
2	JPN	Yuzuru Hanyu	2240	2014/2015 season (100%)	1080	800	360	0	0
3	RUS	Sergei Voronov	2207	2014/2015 season (100%)	680	648	360	300	219
4	KAZ	Denis Ten	1888	2014/2015 season (100%)	972	324	292	300	0
5	USA	Jason Brown	1797	2014/2015 season (100%)	875	360	262	300	0
6	RUS	Maxim Kovtun	1739	2014/2015 season (100%)	756	583	400	0	0
7	CAN	Nam Nguyen	1673	2014/2015 season (100%)	787	324	292	270	0
8	JPN	Takahito Mura	1641	2014/2015 season (100%)	446	525	400	270	0
9	CZE	Michal Brezina	1628	2014/2015 season (100%)	551	324	213	270	270
10	JPN	Daisuke Murakami	1505	2014/2015 season (100%)	612	400	0	250	243
11	UZB	Misha Ge	1482	2014/2015 season (100%)	709	292	262	219	0
12	RUS	Alexander Petrov	1429	2014/2015 season (100%)	295	284	250	300	300
13	JPN	Shoma Uno	1401	2014/2015 season (100%)	551	350	250	250	0
14	ISR	Alexei Bychenko	1273	2014/2015 season (100%)	612	213	0	250	198
15	RUS	Adian Pitkeev	1161	2014/2015 season (100%)	446	236	236	243	0
16	CHN	Han Yan	1107	2014/2015 season (100%)	680	236	191	0	0
17	USA	Adam Rippon	1106	2014/2015 season (100%)	574	262	0	270	0
18	RUS	Konstantin Menshov	1040	2014/2015 season (100%)	0	292	262	243	243
19	RUS	Alexander Samarin	1016	2014/2015 season (100%)	174	225	203	270	144
20	CHN	Boyang Jin	955	2014/2015 season (100%)	450	255	250	0	0
21	JPN	Sota Yamamoto	945	2014/2015 season (100%)	405	315	225	0	0
22	FRA	Florent Amodio	913	2014/2015 season (100%)	517	236	0	160	0
23	ISR	Daniel Samohin	889	2014/2015 season (100%)	325	120	0	225	219
24	JPN	Tatsuki Machida	872	2014/2015 season (100%)	0	472	400	0	0
25	KOR	June Hyoung Lee	840	2014/2015 season (100%)	180	250	207	203	0
26	USA	Max Aaron	837	2014/2015 season (100%)	0	324	213	300	0
26	USA	Richard Dornbush	837	2014/2015 season (100%)	0	324	213	300	0
28	RUS	Andrei Lazukin	818	2014/2015 season (100%)	0	250	120	250	198
29	ITA	Ivan Righini	812	2014/2015 season (100%)	402	0	0	250	160
30	JPN	Takahiko Kozuka	804	2014/2015 season (100%)	377	236	191	0	0
31	USA	Ross Miner	783	2014/2015 season (100%)	0	213	0	300	270
32	USA	Joshua Farris	756	2014/2015 season (100%)	756	0	0	0	0
33	GER	Franz Streubel	712	2014/2015 season (100%)	237	0	0	250	225
34	USA	Douglas Razzano	710	2014/2015 season (100%)	0	191	0	300	219
34	KOR	Jin Seo Kim	710	2014/2015 season (100%)	215	0	0	270	225
36	HKG	Ronald Lam	701	2014/2015 season (100%)	305	0	0	198	198
37	GER	Peter Liebers	699	2014/2015 season (100%)	496	0	0	203	0
38	CAN	Jeremy Ten	698	2014/2015 season (100%)	264	191	0	243	0
39	CZE	Petr Coufal	686	2014/2015 season (100%)	264	0	0	219	203
40	FRA	Chafik Besseghier	638	2014/2015 season (100%)	200	213	0	225	0
41	LAT	Deniss Vasiljevs	630	2014/2015 season (100%)	266	182	182	0	0
42	UKR	Ivan Pavlov	625	2014/2015 season (100%)	103	164	133	225	0
43	CAN	Roman Sadovsky	607	2014/2015 season (100%)	127	250	230	0	0
44	ESP	Javier Raya	603	2014/2015 season (100%)	214	0	0	225	164
45	PHI	Michael Christian Martinez	594	2014/2015 season (100%)	146	0	0	270	178
46	USA	Stephen Carriere	592	2014/2015 season (100%)	0	292	0	300	0
47	USA	Nathan Chen	590	2014/2015 season (100%)	365	225	0	0	0
48	GBR	Phillip Harris	572	2014/2015 season (100%)	192	0	0	198	182
49	CHN	He Zhang	569	2014/2015 season (100%)	141	225	203	0	0
50	USA	Andrew Torgashev	540	2014/2015 season (100%)	194	182	164	0	0
51	USA	Jeremy Abbott	524	2014/2015 season (100%)	0	262	262	0	0
52	FIN	Valtter Virtanen	521	2014/2015 season (100%)	140	0	0	203	178
53	SWE	Alexander Majorov	518	2014/2015 season (100%)	293	0	0	225	0
54	ARG	Denis Margalik	515	2014/2015 season (100%)	173	182	0	160	0
55	RUS	Gordei Gorshkov	513	2014/2015 season (100%)	0	0	0	270	243
56	GBR	Graham Newberry	486	2014/2015 season (100%)	61	148	133	144	0
57	RUS	Artur Dmitriev	468	2014/2015 season (100%)	0	0	0	243	225
58	DEN	Justus Strid	450	2014/2015 season (100%)	126	0	0	164	160
59	USA	Grant Hochstein	438	2014/2015 season (100%)	0	0	0	219	219
60	POL	Patrick Myzyk	435	2014/2015 season (100%)	113	0	0	178	144
61	CAN	Elladj Balde	434	2014/2015 season (100%)	0	236	0	198	0
62	TPE	Chih-I Tsao	428	2014/2015 season (100%)	126	120	0	182	0
63	RUS	Dmitri Aliev	406	2014/2015 season (100%)	0	203	203	0	0
64	GER	Paul Fentz	401	2014/2015 season (100%)	0	0	0	219	182
65	RUS	Moris Kvitelashvili	396	2014/2015 season (100%)	0	0	0	198	198
66	JPN	Keiji Tanaka	394	2014/2015 season (100%)	0	191	0	203	0
67	UKR	Yaroslav Paniot	376	2014/2015 season (100%)	173	203	0	0	0
68	GER	Alexander Bjelde	367	2014/2015 season (100%)	0	0	0	203	164
68	JPN	Sei Kawahara	367	2014/2015 season (100%)	0	203	164	0	0
70	CHN	Yi Wang	362	2014/2015 season (100%)	362	0	0	0	0
71	FRA	Adrien Tesson	351	2014/2015 season (100%)	0	148	0	203	0
72	JPN	Hidetsugu Kamata	346	2014/2015 season (100%)	0	164	0	182	0
73	USA	Shotaro Omori	330	2014/2015 season (100%)	0	182	148	0	0
74	FRA	Simon Hocquaux	328	2014/2015 season (100%)	0	164	164	0	0
75	AUS	Brendan Kerry	326	2014/2015 season (100%)	162	0	0	164	0
75	FIN	Viktor Zubik	326	2014/2015 season (100%)	0	0	0	182	144
77	GER	Niko Ulanovsky	323	2014/2015 season (100%)	93	133	97	0	0
78	USA	Alexander Johnson	322	2014/2015 season (100%)	0	0	0	178	144
79	ITA	Matteo Rizzo	298	2014/2015 season (100%)	55	0	0	243	0
80	CAN	Anthony Kan	281	2014/2015 season (100%)	0	148	133	0	0
81	BLR	Pavel Ignatenko	280	2014/2015 season (100%)	102	0	0	178	0
82	RUS	Daniil Bernadiner	268	2014/2015 season (100%)	0	148	120	0	0
83	CAN	Nicolas Nadeau	261	2014/2015 season (100%)	0	164	97	0	0
84	FRA	Romain Ponsart	250	2014/2015 season (100%)	0	0	0	250	0
85	ARM	Slavik Hayrapetyan	247	2014/2015 season (100%)	44	0	0	203	0
86	GER	Martin Rappe	243	2014/2015 season (100%)	0	0	0	243	0
87	MAS	Julian Zhi Jie Yee	240	2014/2015 season (100%)	92	148	0	0	0
88	JPN	Hiroaki Sato	234	2014/2015 season (100%)	114	120	0	0	0
89	CAN	Mitchell Gordon	230	2014/2015 season (100%)	0	133	97	0	0
90	FRA	Kevin Aymoz	225	2014/2015 season (100%)	0	0	0	225	0
91	HUN	Kristof Forgo	219	2014/2015 season (100%)	0	0	0	219	0
91	USA	Timothy Dolensky	219	2014/2015 season (100%)	0	0	0	219	0
93	FRA	Daniel Albert Naurits	217	2014/2015 season (100%)	0	120	97	0	0
94	CAN	Liam Firus	214	2014/2015 season (100%)	214	0	0	0	0
95	JPN	Ryuju Hino	203	2014/2015 season (100%)	0	0	0	203	0
96	USA	Kevin Shum	201	2014/2015 season (100%)	68	133	0	0	0
97	RUS	Evgeni Vlasov	198	2014/2015 season (100%)	0	0	0	198	0
97	GBR	Jack Newberry	198	2014/2015 season (100%)	0	0	0	198	0
99	RUS	Artur Gachinski	191	2014/2015 season (100%)	0	191	0	0	0
99	KOR	Se Jong Byun	191	2014/2015 season (100%)	83	108	0	0	0
101	RUS	Murad Kurbanov	182	2014/2015 season (100%)	0	182	0	0	0
101	GBR	Peter James Hallam	182	2014/2015 season (100%)	0	0	0	182	0
101	JPN	Yoji Tsuboi	182	2014/2015 season (100%)	0	0	0	182	0
104	CAN	Andrei Rogozine	178	2014/2015 season (100%)	0	0	0	178	0
104	CAN	Kevin Reynolds	178	2014/2015 season (100%)	0	0	0	178	0
104	SVK	Marco Klepoch	178	2014/2015 season (100%)	0	0	0	178	0
104	RUS	Sergei Borodulin	178	2014/2015 season (100%)	0	0	0	178	0
108	ESP	Felipe Montoya	164	2014/2015 season (100%)	0	0	0	164	0
108	FIN	Matthias Versluis	164	2014/2015 season (100%)	0	0	0	164	0
108	NED	Thomas Kennes	164	2014/2015 season (100%)	0	0	0	164	0
111	GBR	Harry Mattick	160	2014/2015 season (100%)	0	0	0	160	0
111	SVK	Jakub Krsnak	160	2014/2015 season (100%)	0	0	0	160	0
111	USA	Jordan Moeller	160	2014/2015 season (100%)	0	0	0	160	0
111	SWE	Marcus Björk	160	2014/2015 season (100%)	0	0	0	160	0
115	CZE	Pavel Kaska	156	2014/2015 season (100%)	156	0	0	0	0
116	RUS	Vladimir Samoilov	148	2014/2015 season (100%)	0	148	0	0	0
117	FIN	Bela Papp	144	2014/2015 season (100%)	0	0	0	144	0
117	GER	Panagiotis Polizoakis	144	2014/2015 season (100%)	0	0	0	144	0
119	USA	Paolo Borromeo	133	2014/2015 season (100%)	0	133	0	0	0
120	CZE	Petr Kotlarik	120	2014/2015 season (100%)	0	120	0	0	0
121	KAZ	Abzal Rakimgaliev	113	2014/2015 season (100%)	113	0	0	0	0
122	USA	Chase Belmontes	108	2014/2015 season (100%)	0	108	0	0	0
122	USA	Daniel Kulenkamp	108	2014/2015 season (100%)	0	108	0	0	0
122	USA	Luke West	108	2014/2015 season (100%)	0	108	0	0	0
122	SWE	Nicky Obreykov	108	2014/2015 season (100%)	0	108	0	0	0
122	CHN	Tangxu Li	108	2014/2015 season (100%)	0	108	0	0	0
122	USA	Tony Lu	108	2014/2015 season (100%)	0	108	0	0	0
128	CHN	Yuhang Guan	102	2014/2015 season (100%)	102	0	0	0	0
129	CAN	Bennet Toman	97	2014/2015 season (100%)	0	97	0	0	0
129	JPN	Kento Kajita	97	2014/2015 season (100%)	0	97	0	0	0
129	JPN	Shu Nakamura	97	2014/2015 season (100%)	0	97	0	0	0
132	NOR	Sondre Oddvoll Bøe	92	2014/2015 season (100%)	92	0	0	0	0
133	GEO	Irakli Maysuradze	83	2014/2015 season (100%)	83	0	0	0	0
133	AZE	Larry Loupolover	83	2014/2015 season (100%)	83	0	0	0	0
135	HKG	Harry Hau Yin Lee	74	2014/2015 season (100%)	74	0	0	0	0
136	SUI	Nicola Todeschini	49	2014/2015 season (100%)	49	0	0	0	0

== Ladies' singles (139 skaters) ==
As of 28 March 2015

Rank	Nation	Skater	Points	Season	ISU Championships or Olympics	(Junior) Grand Prix and Final		Selected International Competition	
Rank	Nation	Skater	Points	Season	Best	Best	2nd Best	Best	2nd Best
1	RUS	Elizaveta Tuktamysheva	3000	2014/2015 season (100%)	1200	800	400	300	300
2	RUS	Elena Radionova	2092	2014/2015 season (100%)	972	720	400	0	0
3	JPN	Satoko Miyahara	2028	2014/2015 season (100%)	1080	324	324	300	0
4	USA	Gracie Gold	1842	2014/2015 season (100%)	875	400	324	243	0
5	JPN	Rika Hongo	1824	2014/2015 season (100%)	709	472	400	243	0
6	USA	Ashley Wagner	1795	2014/2015 season (100%)	787	648	360	0	0
7	RUS	Anna Pogorilaya	1663	2014/2015 season (100%)	680	583	400	0	0
8	USA	Polina Edmunds	1623	2014/2015 season (100%)	840	292	191	300	0
9	JPN	Kanako Murakami	1504	2014/2015 season (100%)	638	324	292	250	0
10	LAT	Angelina Kuchvalska	1262	2014/2015 season (100%)	446	133	133	300	250
11	CAN	Gabrielle Daleman	1244	2014/2015 season (100%)	446	262	236	300	0
12	USA	Samantha Cesario	1177	2014/2015 season (100%)	402	292	213	270	0
13	CAN	Alaine Chartrand	1174	2014/2015 season (100%)	418	324	213	219	0
14	SWE	Joshi Helgesson	1132	2014/2015 season (100%)	612	0	0	270	250
15	SWE	Viktoria Helgesson	1127	2014/2015 season (100%)	551	213	0	219	144
16	RUS	Evgenia Medvedeva	1100	2014/2015 season (100%)	500	350	250	0	0
17	RUS	Alena Leonova	1085	2014/2015 season (100%)	0	360	236	270	219
18	SVK	Nicole Rajicová	1078	2014/2015 season (100%)	293	182	182	243	178
19	GER	Nicole Schott	1045	2014/2015 season (100%)	362	133	97	250	203
20	RUS	Serafima Sakhanovich	1015	2014/2015 season (100%)	450	315	250	0	0
21	CHN	Zijun Li	1000	2014/2015 season (100%)	551	236	213	0	0
22	ITA	Roberta Rodeghiero	952	2014/2015 season (100%)	402	0	0	300	250
23	JPN	Yuka Nagai	951	2014/2015 season (100%)	496	230	225	0	0
24	JPN	Wakaba Higuchi	939	2014/2015 season (100%)	405	284	250	0	0
25	GER	Lutricia Bock	912	2014/2015 season (100%)	127	182	108	270	225
26	KOR	So Youn Park	901	2014/2015 season (100%)	377	262	262	0	0
27	RUS	Yulia Lipnitskaya	885	2014/2015 season (100%)	0	525	360	0	0
28	USA	Courtney Hicks	854	2014/2015 season (100%)	0	292	292	270	0
29	ARM	Anastasia Galustyan	852	2014/2015 season (100%)	237	120	0	270	225
30	FIN	Jenni Saarinen	850	2014/2015 season (100%)	141	108	108	250	243
31	RUS	Maria Sotskova	833	2014/2015 season (100%)	328	255	250	0	0
32	KAZ	Elizabet Tursynbaeva	793	2014/2015 season (100%)	365	225	203	0	0
33	FRA	Maé-Bérénice Méité	758	2014/2015 season (100%)	496	262	0	0	0
34	AUS	Brooklee Han	744	2014/2015 season (100%)	156	191	0	219	178
35	JPN	Riona Kato	730	2014/2015 season (100%)	0	262	0	243	225
36	USA	Mirai Nagasu	726	2014/2015 season (100%)	0	292	236	198	0
37	FRA	Laurine Lecavelier	692	2014/2015 season (100%)	325	0	0	203	164
38	RUS	Maria Artemieva	684	2014/2015 season (100%)	0	236	0	270	178
39	SLO	Dasa Grm	675	2014/2015 season (100%)	200	0	0	250	225
40	USA	Karen Chen	667	2014/2015 season (100%)	239	225	203	0	0
41	GER	Nathalie Weinzierl	622	2014/2015 season (100%)	264	0	0	198	160
42	HUN	Ivett Tóth	613	2014/2015 season (100%)	0	120	0	250	243
43	SUI	Eveline Brunner	599	2014/2015 season (100%)	214	0	0	203	182
44	JPN	Haruka Imai	580	2014/2015 season (100%)	0	191	191	198	0
44	JPN	Mariko Kihara	580	2014/2015 season (100%)	0	182	148	250	0
46	USA	Hannah Miller	570	2014/2015 season (100%)	0	0	0	300	270
47	LTU	Aleksandra Golovkina	567	2014/2015 season (100%)	126	0	0	243	198
48	LUX	Fleur Maxwell	563	2014/2015 season (100%)	113	0	0	225	225
49	KOR	Da Bin Choi	561	2014/2015 season (100%)	215	182	164	0	0
50	ITA	Giada Russo	556	2014/2015 season (100%)	106	0	0	225	225
51	FIN	Liubov Efimenko	546	2014/2015 season (100%)	0	108	0	219	219
52	AUT	Kerstin Frank	541	2014/2015 season (100%)	156	0	0	203	182
53	CZE	Eliška Brezinová	534	2014/2015 season (100%)	192	0	0	178	164
54	USA	Angela Wang	513	2014/2015 season (100%)	0	0	0	270	243
55	ESP	Sonia Lafuente	503	2014/2015 season (100%)	140	0	0	203	160
56	AUS	Kailani Craine	489	2014/2015 season (100%)	264	0	0	225	0
57	NOR	Camilla Gjersem	485	2014/2015 season (100%)	102	0	0	219	164
58	KOR	Hae Jin Kim	484	2014/2015 season (100%)	293	191	0	0	0
59	SWE	Isabelle Olsson	473	2014/2015 season (100%)	0	0	0	270	203
60	JPN	Miyabi Oba	461	2014/2015 season (100%)	0	236	0	225	0
61	JPN	Miyu Nakashio	457	2014/2015 season (100%)	0	250	207	0	0
62	NED	Niki Wories	455	2014/2015 season (100%)	49	0	0	203	203
63	NOR	Anne Line Gjersem	447	2014/2015 season (100%)	222	0	0	225	0
64	USA	Ashley Cain	434	2014/2015 season (100%)	0	191	0	243	0
65	DEN	Pernille Sorensen	432	2014/2015 season (100%)	0	0	0	250	182
65	ITA	Sara Falotico	432	2014/2015 season (100%)	0	0	0	250	182
67	JPN	Kaori Sakamoto	428	2014/2015 season (100%)	295	133	0	0	0
68	ITA	Carol Bressanutti	414	2014/2015 season (100%)	0	0	0	250	164
69	JPN	Rin Nitaya	407	2014/2015 season (100%)	0	225	182	0	0
70	RUS	Alexandra Proklova	406	2014/2015 season (100%)	0	203	203	0	0
71	FIN	Viveca Lindfors	385	2014/2015 season (100%)	0	0	0	203	182
72	ITA	Micol Cristini	381	2014/2015 season (100%)	0	0	0	203	178
73	CAN	Veronik Mallet	374	2014/2015 season (100%)	214	0	0	160	0
74	RUS	Alsu Kaiumova	367	2014/2015 season (100%)	0	203	164	0	0
75	RUS	Diana Pervushkina	362	2014/2015 season (100%)	0	164	0	198	0
76	LAT	Diana Nikitina	358	2014/2015 season (100%)	194	164	0	0	0
77	UKR	Natalia Popova	355	2014/2015 season (100%)	173	0	0	182	0
78	USA	Amber Glenn	351	2014/2015 season (100%)	0	203	148	0	0
79	FIN	Hanna Kiviniemi	346	2014/2015 season (100%)	0	0	0	182	164
80	GEO	Elene Gedevanishvili	344	2014/2015 season (100%)	131	213	0	0	0
81	USA	Mariah Bell	342	2014/2015 season (100%)	0	0	0	198	144
82	FIN	Juulia Turkkila	338	2014/2015 season (100%)	0	0	0	178	160
83	RUS	Elizaveta Iushenko	328	2014/2015 season (100%)	0	164	164	0	0
84	USA	Leah Keiser	323	2014/2015 season (100%)	0	203	120	0	0
85	KOR	Na Hyun Kim	312	2014/2015 season (100%)	0	164	148	0	0
86	GER	Sarah Hecken	308	2014/2015 season (100%)	0	0	0	164	144
87	FIN	Kiira Korpi	300	2014/2015 season (100%)	0	0	0	300	0
88	BRA	Isadora Williams	284	2014/2015 season (100%)	140	0	0	144	0
89	GER	Lea Johanna Dastich	253	2014/2015 season (100%)	0	133	120	0	0
90	CAN	Julianne Séguin	243	2014/2015 season (100%)	0	0	0	243	0
91	KOR	Song Joo Chea	237	2014/2015 season (100%)	237	0	0	0	0
92	SWE	Elin Hallberg	225	2014/2015 season (100%)	0	0	0	225	0
93	UKR	Anastasia Kononenko	219	2014/2015 season (100%)	0	0	0	219	0
94	CAN	Kim Deguise Leveillee	217	2014/2015 season (100%)	0	120	97	0	0
95	RUS	Maria Stavitskaia	213	2014/2015 season (100%)	0	213	0	0	0
96	CAN	Selena Zhao	205	2014/2015 season (100%)	0	108	97	0	0
97	ROU	Julia Sauter	203	2014/2015 season (100%)	0	0	0	203	0
97	AUT	Sophie Almassy	203	2014/2015 season (100%)	0	0	0	203	0
99	USA	Barbie Long	198	2014/2015 season (100%)	0	0	0	198	0
100	PHI	Melissa Bulanhagui	192	2014/2015 season (100%)	192	0	0	0	0
101	SUI	Anna Ovcharova	182	2014/2015 season (100%)	0	0	0	182	0
101	ITA	Briley Pizzelanti	182	2014/2015 season (100%)	0	0	0	182	0
101	ITA	Chiara Calderone	182	2014/2015 season (100%)	0	0	0	182	0
101	ITA	Ilaria Nogaro	182	2014/2015 season (100%)	0	0	0	182	0
101	SLO	Nika Ceric	182	2014/2015 season (100%)	0	0	0	182	0
106	FIN	Beata Papp	178	2014/2015 season (100%)	0	0	0	178	0
107	PHI	Alisson Krystle Perticheto	173	2014/2015 season (100%)	173	0	0	0	0
108	BUL	Daniela Stoeva	164	2014/2015 season (100%)	0	0	0	164	0
108	FIN	Justiina Niemi	164	2014/2015 season (100%)	0	0	0	164	0
108	SLO	Pina Umek	164	2014/2015 season (100%)	0	0	0	164	0
108	SUI	Tanja Odermatt	164	2014/2015 season (100%)	0	0	0	164	0
108	FIN	Timila Shrestha	164	2014/2015 season (100%)	0	0	0	164	0
113	USA	Ashley Shin	160	2014/2015 season (100%)	0	0	0	160	0
113	GBR	Karly Robertson	160	2014/2015 season (100%)	0	0	0	160	0
113	KOR	Kyu Eun Kim	160	2014/2015 season (100%)	0	0	0	160	0
116	CHN	Xiangning Li	158	2014/2015 season (100%)	61	97	0	0	0
117	SIN	Shuran Yu	152	2014/2015 season (100%)	44	108	0	0	0
118	JPN	Hina Takeno	148	2014/2015 season (100%)	0	148	0	0	0
118	FRA	Julie Froetscher	148	2014/2015 season (100%)	0	148	0	0	0
118	JPN	Mai Mihara	148	2014/2015 season (100%)	0	148	0	0	0
118	JPN	Yuhana Yokoi	148	2014/2015 season (100%)	0	148	0	0	0
122	SIN	Chloe Ing	144	2014/2015 season (100%)	0	0	0	144	0
122	SUI	Laure Nicodet	144	2014/2015 season (100%)	0	0	0	144	0
124	JPN	Emiri Nagata	133	2014/2015 season (100%)	0	133	0	0	0
124	FRA	Nadjma Mahamoud	133	2014/2015 season (100%)	0	133	0	0	0
126	MEX	Reyna Hamui	126	2014/2015 season (100%)	126	0	0	0	0
127	USA	Bradie Tennell	120	2014/2015 season (100%)	0	120	0	0	0
127	KOR	Hwi Choi	120	2014/2015 season (100%)	0	120	0	0	0
129	ITA	Guia Maria Tagliapietra	114	2014/2015 season (100%)	114	0	0	0	0
130	FIN	Emmi Peltonen	108	2014/2015 season (100%)	0	108	0	0	0
131	CZE	Anna Dušková	97	2014/2015 season (100%)	0	97	0	0	0
131	CAN	Larkyn Austman	97	2014/2015 season (100%)	0	97	0	0	0
131	ISR	Netta Schreiber	97	2014/2015 season (100%)	0	97	0	0	0
134	CZE	Elizaveta Ukolova	93	2014/2015 season (100%)	93	0	0	0	0
135	EST	Gerli Liinamäe	92	2014/2015 season (100%)	92	0	0	0	0
136	LTU	Deimante Kizalaite	83	2014/2015 season (100%)	83	0	0	0	0
137	USA	Tyler Pierce	75	2014/2015 season (100%)	75	0	0	0	0
138	FRA	Lea Serna	68	2014/2015 season (100%)	68	0	0	0	0
139	NOR	Juni Marie Benjaminsen	55	2014/2015 season (100%)	55	0	0	0	0

== Pairs (65 couples) ==
As of 26 March 2015

Rank	Nation	Couple	Points	Season	ISU Championships or Olympics	(Junior) Grand Prix and Final		Selected International Competition	
Rank	Nation	Couple	Points	Season	Best	Best	2nd Best	Best	2nd Best
1	CAN	Meagan Duhamel / Eric Radford	2700	2014/2015 season (100%)	1200	800	400	300	0
2	CHN	Wenjing Sui / Cong Han	2088	2014/2015 season (100%)	1080	648	360	0	0
3	RUS	Yuko Kavaguti / Alexander Smirnov	2012	2014/2015 season (100%)	840	472	400	300	0
4	RUS	Ksenia Stolbova / Fedor Klimov	1876	2014/2015 season (100%)	756	720	400	0	0
5	CHN	Cheng Peng / Hao Zhang	1858	2014/2015 season (100%)	875	583	400	0	0
6	USA	Alexa Scimeca / Chris Knierim	1765	2014/2015 season (100%)	638	292	292	300	243
7	USA	Haven Denney / Brandon Frazier	1668	2014/2015 season (100%)	446	360	292	300	270
8	RUS	Evgenia Tarasova / Vladimir Morozov	1663	2014/2015 season (100%)	709	360	324	270	0
9	ITA	Nicole Della Monica / Matteo Guarise	1494	2014/2015 season (100%)	496	262	236	250	250
10	CHN	Xiaoyu Yu / Yang Jin	1385	2014/2015 season (100%)	500	525	360	0	0
11	GER	Mari Vartmann / Aaron Van Cleave	1345	2014/2015 season (100%)	446	262	191	243	203
12	FRA	Vanessa James / Morgan Ciprès	1294	2014/2015 season (100%)	551	262	262	219	0
13	RUS	Lina Fedorova / Maxim Miroshkin	1245	2014/2015 season (100%)	405	315	225	300	0
14	AUT	Miriam Ziegler / Severin Kiefer	1218	2014/2015 season (100%)	402	191	191	270	164
15	CAN	Julianne Séguin / Charlie Bilodeau	1174	2014/2015 season (100%)	574	350	250	0	0
16	RUS	Kristina Astakhova / Alexei Rogonov	1089	2014/2015 season (100%)	465	324	0	300	0
17	RUS	Vera Bazarova / Andrei Deputat	1052	2014/2015 season (100%)	0	292	292	243	225
18	USA	Jessica Calalang / Zack Sidhu	988	2014/2015 season (100%)	0	262	213	270	243
19	CHN	Qing Pang / Jian Tong	972	2014/2015 season (100%)	972	0	0	0	0
20	ITA	Valentina Marchei / Ondrej Hotárek	882	2014/2015 season (100%)	612	0	0	270	0
21	ITA	Bianca Manacorda / Niccolo Macii	837	2014/2015 season (100%)	157	120	108	270	182
22	CAN	Kirsten Moore-Towers / Michael Marinaro	811	2014/2015 season (100%)	362	236	213	0	0
23	GBR	Caitlin Yankowskas / Hamish Gaman	806	2014/2015 season (100%)	362	0	0	225	219
24	USA	Madeline Aaron / Max Settlage	797	2014/2015 season (100%)	0	292	262	243	0
25	JPN	Narumi Takahashi / Ryuichi Kihara	751	2014/2015 season (100%)	325	213	213	0	0
26	RUS	Anastasia Gubanova / Alexei Sintsov	750	2014/2015 season (100%)	365	203	182	0	0
27	ITA	Alessandra Cernuschi / Filippo Ambrosini	748	2014/2015 season (100%)	325	0	0	225	198
28	GER	Minerva Fabienne Hase / Nolan Seegert	699	2014/2015 season (100%)	293	0	0	203	203
29	USA	Chelsea Liu / Brian Johnson	676	2014/2015 season (100%)	266	207	203	0	0
30	RUS	Daria Beklemisheva / Maxim Bobrov	654	2014/2015 season (100%)	174	255	225	0	0
31	CHN	Xuehan Wang / Lei Wang	648	2014/2015 season (100%)	0	324	324	0	0
32	USA	Tarah Kayne / Danny O'Shea	645	2014/2015 season (100%)	402	0	0	243	0
33	CAN	Vanessa Grenier / Maxime Deschamps	632	2014/2015 season (100%)	0	236	0	198	198
34	JPN	Ami Koga / Francis Boudreau Audet	625	2014/2015 season (100%)	295	182	148	0	0
35	BUL	Elizaveta Makarova / Leri Kenchadze	622	2014/2015 season (100%)	237	0	0	203	182
36	RUS	Maria Vigalova / Egor Zakroev	534	2014/2015 season (100%)	0	284	250	0	0
37	GBR	Amani Fancy / Christopher Boyadji	514	2014/2015 season (100%)	264	0	0	250	0
38	CAN	Lubov Iliushechkina / Dylan Moscovitch	496	2014/2015 season (100%)	496	0	0	0	0
39	CAN	Mary Orr / Phelan Simpson	475	2014/2015 season (100%)	194	148	133	0	0
40	CZE	Anna Dušková / Martin Bidař	456	2014/2015 season (100%)	239	120	97	0	0
41	RUS	Kamilla Gainetdinova / Sergei Alexeev	455	2014/2015 season (100%)	0	230	225	0	0
41	CAN	Natasha Purich / Andrew Wolfe	455	2014/2015 season (100%)	0	236	0	219	0
43	GER	Annabelle Prölss / Ruben Blommaert	449	2014/2015 season (100%)	0	236	213	0	0
44	CAN	Brittany Jones / Joshua Reagan	432	2014/2015 season (100%)	0	213	0	219	0
45	USA	Dee Dee Leng / Simon Shnapir	427	2014/2015 season (100%)	0	236	191	0	0
46	RUS	Arina Cherniavskaia / Antonino Souza-Kordyeru	410	2014/2015 season (100%)	0	191	0	219	0
47	UKR	Renata Oganesian / Mark Bardei	367	2014/2015 season (100%)	0	203	164	0	0
48	CAN	Shalena Rau / Sebastian Arcieri	348	2014/2015 season (100%)	215	133	0	0	0
49	USA	Caitlin Fields / Ernie Utah Stevens	328	2014/2015 season (100%)	328	0	0	0	0
50	RUS	Maria Chuzhanova / Denis Mintsev	312	2014/2015 season (100%)	0	164	148	0	0
51	USA	Lindsay Weinstein / Jacob Simon	297	2014/2015 season (100%)	0	164	133	0	0
52	USA	Gretchen Donlan / Nathan Bartholomay	250	2014/2015 season (100%)	0	0	0	250	0
53	JPN	Sumire Suto / Konstantin Chizhikov	241	2014/2015 season (100%)	0	133	108	0	0
54	BLR	Tatiana Danilova / Mikalai Kamianchuk	225	2014/2015 season (100%)	0	0	0	225	0
55	AUS	Paris Stephens / Matthew Dodds	219	2014/2015 season (100%)	0	0	0	219	0
56	USA	Olivia Allan / Austin Hale	217	2014/2015 season (100%)	0	120	97	0	0
57	BLR	Maria Paliakova / Nikita Bochkov	214	2014/2015 season (100%)	214	0	0	0	0
58	HKG	Marin Ono / Hon Lam To	198	2014/2015 season (100%)	0	0	0	198	0
59	FRA	Camille Mendoza / Pavel Kovalev	182	2014/2015 season (100%)	0	0	0	182	0
60	SUI	Alexandra Herbrikova / Nicolas Roulet	164	2014/2015 season (100%)	0	0	0	164	0
60	CAN	Hope McLean / Trennt Michaud	164	2014/2015 season (100%)	0	164	0	0	0
60	ESP	Marcelina Lech / Aritz Maestu	164	2014/2015 season (100%)	0	0	0	164	0
60	TUR	Olga Beständigová / İlhan Mansız	164	2014/2015 season (100%)	0	0	0	164	0
64	USA	Cirinia Gillett / Maximiliano Fernandez	148	2014/2015 season (100%)	0	148	0	0	0
65	USA	Jessica Lee / Robert Hennings	108	2014/2015 season (100%)	0	108	0	0	0

== Ice dance (101 couples) ==
As of 27 March 2015

Rank	Nation	Couple	Points	Season	ISU Championships or Olympics	(Junior) Grand Prix and Final		Selected International Competition	
Rank	Nation	Couple	Points	Season	Best	Best	2nd Best	Best	2nd Best
1	FRA	Gabriella Papadakis / Guillaume Cizeron	2548	2014/2015 season (100%)	1200	648	400	300	0
2	CAN	Kaitlyn Weaver / Andrew Poje	2472	2014/2015 season (100%)	972	800	400	300	0
3	USA	Madison Chock / Evan Bates	2470	2014/2015 season (100%)	1080	720	400	270	0
4	USA	Maia Shibutani / Alex Shibutani	2330	2014/2015 season (100%)	787	583	360	300	300
5	CAN	Piper Gilles / Paul Poirier	1864	2014/2015 season (100%)	709	525	360	270	0
6	RUS	Alexandra Stepanova / Ivan Bukin	1566	2014/2015 season (100%)	680	324	262	300	0
7	ITA	Charlene Guignard / Marco Fabbri	1534	2014/2015 season (100%)	496	262	236	270	270
8	GER	Nelli Zhiganshina / Alexander Gazsi	1513	2014/2015 season (100%)	446	292	262	270	243
9	RUS	Ksenia Monko / Kirill Khaliavin	1476	2014/2015 season (100%)	574	360	292	250	0
10	ESP	Sara Hurtado / Adria Diaz	1475	2014/2015 season (100%)	551	292	191	243	198
11	RUS	Elena Ilinykh / Ruslan Zhiganshin	1470	2014/2015 season (100%)	638	472	360	0	0
12	USA	Madison Hubbell / Zachary Donohue	1413	2014/2015 season (100%)	465	324	324	300	0
13	USA	Kaitlin Hawayek / Jean-Luc Baker	1330	2014/2015 season (100%)	551	324	236	219	0
14	UKR	Alexandra Nazarova / Maxim Nikitin	1279	2014/2015 season (100%)	405	203	182	270	219
15	SVK	Federica Testa / Lukáš Csölley	1215	2014/2015 season (100%)	402	213	0	300	300
16	CAN	Alexandra Paul / Mitchell Islam	1213	2014/2015 season (100%)	496	262	236	219	0
17	ITA	Anna Cappellini / Luca Lanotte	1199	2014/2015 season (100%)	875	324	0	0	0
18	CHN	Shiyue Wang / Xinyu Liu	1175	2014/2015 season (100%)	446	236	0	250	243
19	RUS	Anna Yanovskaya / Sergey Mozgov	1100	2014/2015 season (100%)	500	350	250	0	0
20	GBR	Penny Coomes / Nicholas Buckland	1086	2014/2015 season (100%)	0	324	262	250	250
21	KOR	Rebeka Kim / Kirill Minov	1009	2014/2015 season (100%)	362	213	191	243	0
22	DEN	Laurence Fournier Beaudry / Nikolaj Sørensen	931	2014/2015 season (100%)	418	0	0	270	243
23	USA	Lorraine McNamara / Quinn Carpenter	878	2014/2015 season (100%)	450	225	203	0	0
24	CAN	Mackenzie Bent / Garrett MacKeen	833	2014/2015 season (100%)	328	255	250	0	0
25	USA	Rachel Parsons / Michael Parsons	793	2014/2015 season (100%)	365	225	203	0	0
26	CAN	Madeline Edwards / Zhao Kai Pang	775	2014/2015 season (100%)	295	250	230	0	0
27	USA	Alexandra Aldridge / Daniel Eaton	749	2014/2015 season (100%)	0	236	213	300	0
28	USA	Anastasia Cannuscio / Colin McManus	748	2014/2015 season (100%)	0	262	0	243	243
29	POL	Natalia Kaliszek / Maksim Spodirev	719	2014/2015 season (100%)	266	0	0	250	203
30	TUR	Alisa Agafonova / Alper Uçar	714	2014/2015 season (100%)	264	0	0	225	225
31	RUS	Betina Popova / Yuri Vlasenko	708	2014/2015 season (100%)	174	284	250	0	0
32	CAN	Elisabeth Paradis / Francois-Xavier Ouellette	703	2014/2015 season (100%)	0	292	213	198	0
33	CAN	Nicole Orford / Thomas Williams	639	2014/2015 season (100%)	0	191	0	270	178
34	AUT	Barbora Silná / Juri Kurakin	633	2014/2015 season (100%)	140	0	0	250	243
35	ISR	Allison Reed / Vasili Rogov	596	2014/2015 season (100%)	173	0	0	225	198
36	JPN	Emi Hirai / Marien De La Asuncion	593	2014/2015 season (100%)	402	191	0	0	0
37	CZE	Cortney Mansour / Michal Ceska	584	2014/2015 season (100%)	156	0	0	225	203
38	EST	Irina Shtork / Taavi Rand	583	2014/2015 season (100%)	237	0	0	182	164
39	HUN	Carolina Moscheni / Ádám Lukács	582	2014/2015 season (100%)	215	203	164	0	0
40	RUS	Alla Loboda / Pavel Drozd	565	2014/2015 season (100%)	0	315	250	0	0
41	RUS	Sofia Evdokimova / Egor Bazin	558	2014/2015 season (100%)	194	182	182	0	0
42	CHN	Yue Zhao / Xun Zheng	516	2014/2015 season (100%)	325	191	0	0	0
43	FIN	Olesia Karmi / Max Lindholm	507	2014/2015 season (100%)	126	0	0	203	178
44	FRA	Angelique Abachkina / Louis Thauron	505	2014/2015 season (100%)	239	133	133	0	0
44	RUS	Victoria Sinitsina / Nikita Katsalapov	505	2014/2015 season (100%)	0	292	213	0	0
46	MEX	Pilar Maekawa Moreno / Leonardo Maekawa Moreno	491	2014/2015 season (100%)	293	0	0	198	0
47	BLR	Viktoria Kavaliova / Yurii Bieliaiev	473	2014/2015 season (100%)	0	0	0	270	203
48	RUS	Daria Morozova / Mikhail Zhirnov	457	2014/2015 season (100%)	0	250	207	0	0
49	UKR	Valeria Gaistruk / Alexei Olejnik	455	2014/2015 season (100%)	127	164	164	0	0
50	ITA	Misato Komatsubara / Andrea Fabbri	453	2014/2015 season (100%)	0	0	0	250	203
51	GBR	Olivia Smart / Joseph Buckland	450	2014/2015 season (100%)	0	0	0	225	225
52	RUS	Evgenia Kosigina / Nikolai Moroshkin	444	2014/2015 season (100%)	0	0	0	225	219
53	FIN	Henna Lindholm / Ossi Kanervo	438	2014/2015 season (100%)	0	0	0	219	219
54	ITA	Sofia Sforza / Leo Luca Sforza	429	2014/2015 season (100%)	83	0	0	182	164
55	CAN	Brianna Delmaestro / Timothy Lum	428	2014/2015 season (100%)	0	225	203	0	0
56	USA	Elliana Pogrebinsky / Alex Benoit	425	2014/2015 season (100%)	141	164	120	0	0
57	JPN	Cathy Reed / Chris Reed	418	2014/2015 season (100%)	0	236	0	182	0
58	GER	Katharina Müller / Tim Dieck	410	2014/2015 season (100%)	157	133	120	0	0
59	FRA	Sarah Marine Rouffanche / Geoffrey Brissaud	382	2014/2015 season (100%)	114	148	120	0	0
60	ARM	Tina Garabedian / Alexandre Laliberte	369	2014/2015 season (100%)	103	133	133	0	0
61	RUS	Eva Khachaturian / Andrei Bagin	364	2014/2015 season (100%)	0	182	182	0	0
62	USA	Holly Moore / Daniel Klaber	351	2014/2015 season (100%)	0	203	148	0	0
63	FIN	Cecilia Törn / Jussiville Partanen	346	2014/2015 season (100%)	0	0	0	182	164
63	USA	Christina Carreira / Anthony Ponomarenko	346	2014/2015 season (100%)	0	182	164	0	0
65	USA	Julia Biechler / Damian Dodge	312	2014/2015 season (100%)	0	164	148	0	0
66	RUS	Anastasia Shpilevaya / Grigory Smirnov	311	2014/2015 season (100%)	0	203	108	0	0
67	CAN	Audrey Croteau-Villeneuve / Jeff Hough	281	2014/2015 season (100%)	0	148	133	0	0
68	CAN	Danielle Wu / Spencer Soo	268	2014/2015 season (100%)	0	148	120	0	0
69	KAZ	Karina Uzurova / Ilias Ali	264	2014/2015 season (100%)	264	0	0	0	0
70	CAN	Marieve Cyr / Benjamin Brisebois Gaudreau	219	2014/2015 season (100%)	0	0	0	219	0
71	CZE	Nicole Kuzmich / Alexandr Sinicyn	216	2014/2015 season (100%)	0	108	108	0	0
72	CHN	Yiyi Zhang / Nan Wu	213	2014/2015 season (100%)	0	213	0	0	0
73	FRA	Laureline Aubry / Kevin Bellingard	203	2014/2015 season (100%)	0	0	0	203	0
73	UKR	Lolita Yermak / Alexei Shumski	203	2014/2015 season (100%)	0	0	0	203	0
75	BLR	Eugenia Tkachenka / Yuri Hulitski	201	2014/2015 season (100%)	93	108	0	0	0
76	LAT	Olga Jakushina / Andrey Nevskiy	198	2014/2015 season (100%)	0	0	0	198	0
77	AUT	Christine Smith / Simon Eisenbauer	194	2014/2015 season (100%)	0	97	97	0	0
78	POL	Beatrice Tomczak / Damian Binkowski	182	2014/2015 season (100%)	0	0	0	182	0
78	ITA	Federica Bernardi / Saverio Giacomelli	182	2014/2015 season (100%)	0	0	0	182	0
80	GEO	Tatiana Kozmava / Aleksandr Zolotarev	178	2014/2015 season (100%)	0	0	0	178	0
81	POL	Anna Postrybailo / Edwin Siwkowski	164	2014/2015 season (100%)	0	0	0	164	0
81	USA	Chloe Lewis / Logan Bye	164	2014/2015 season (100%)	0	164	0	0	0
81	FRA	Lorenza Alessandrini / Pierre Souquet	164	2014/2015 season (100%)	0	0	0	164	0
81	FRA	Peroline Ojardias / Michael Bramante	164	2014/2015 season (100%)	0	0	0	164	0
81	KOR	Yura Min / Timothy Koleto	164	2014/2015 season (100%)	0	0	0	164	0
86	CAN	Lauren Collins / Shane Firus	148	2014/2015 season (100%)	0	148	0	0	0
86	ITA	Sara Ghislandi / Giona Terzo Ortenzi	148	2014/2015 season (100%)	0	148	0	0	0
88	CAN	Melinda Meng / Andrew Meng	133	2014/2015 season (100%)	0	133	0	0	0
89	USA	Emily Day / Kevin Leahy	120	2014/2015 season (100%)	0	120	0	0	0
89	KAZ	Rebecca Dawn Lucas / Temirlan Yerzhanov	120	2014/2015 season (100%)	0	120	0	0	0
89	CHN	Xibei Li / Guangyao Xiang	120	2014/2015 season (100%)	0	120	0	0	0
92	ISR	Kimberly Berkovich / Ronald Zilberberg	108	2014/2015 season (100%)	0	108	0	0	0
92	GBR	Sammi Wren / Alexey Shcheptov	108	2014/2015 season (100%)	0	108	0	0	0
92	CAN	Valerie Taillefer / Jason Chan	108	2014/2015 season (100%)	0	108	0	0	0
95	CAN	Hannah Whitley / Elliott Graham	97	2014/2015 season (100%)	0	97	0	0	0
95	FRA	Julia Wagret / Mathieu Couyras	97	2014/2015 season (100%)	0	97	0	0	0
95	CZE	Katerina Konickova / Matej Lang	97	2014/2015 season (100%)	0	97	0	0	0
95	UKR	Maria Golubtsova / Kirill Belobrov	97	2014/2015 season (100%)	0	97	0	0	0
95	ITA	Valentina Gabusi / Nik Mirzakhani	97	2014/2015 season (100%)	0	97	0	0	0
100	KOR	Ho Jung Lee / Richard Kang In Kam	75	2014/2015 season (100%)	75	0	0	0	0
101	EST	Marina Elias / Denis Koreline	68	2014/2015 season (100%)	68	0	0	0	0

== World standings for synchronized skating ==
Senior Synchronized (41 Teams)

Junior Synchronized (61 Teams)

== See also ==
- ISU World Standings
- ISU Season's World Ranking
- 2014–15 figure skating season
- 2014–15 synchronized skating season
