= Andrey Nevskiy =

Russian ice dancer (born 1993)

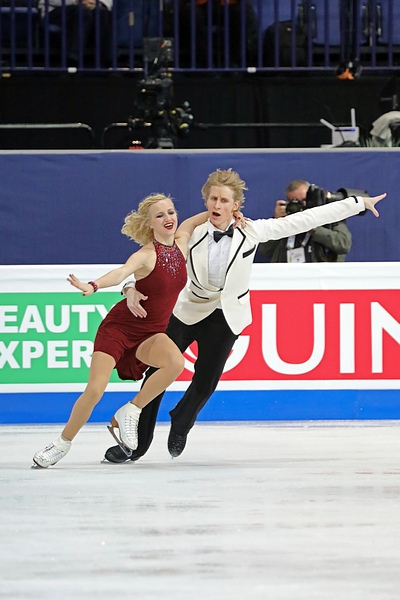

Personal information
- Native name: Андрей Невский
- Other names: Latvian: Andrejs Ņevskis
- Born: 19 March 1993 (age 33) Moscow, Russia
- Height: 1.95 m (6 ft 5 in)

Figure skating career
- Country: Latvia
- Partner: Olga Jakušina
- Coach: Alexander Zhulin
- Skating club: Kristal Ice FSC
- Began skating: 1999

Andrey Nevskiy (Russian: Андрей Невский; Latvian: Andrejs Ņevskis; born 19 March 1993) is a Russian ice dancer. Competing for Latvia with Olga Jakušina, he is the 2015 Volvo Open Cup silver medalist and 2014 Tallinn Trophy bronze medalist. They competed at three World Championships.

== Personal life ==
Nevskiy was born on 19 March 1993 in Moscow. In July 2018, he married Russian single skater Anna Pogorilaya.

== Career ==
=== Early years ===
Nevskiy began learning to skate in 1999. In the 2010–2011 season, he competed on the junior level with Amelie Mepillat for France.

He began his partnership with Tatiana Baturintseva in the 2011–2012 season. Representing Russia in the senior ranks, they placed 4th at the 2012 Ice Star and 16th at the 2012 Golden Spin of Zagreb. They finished 8th at the 2013 Russian Championships.

=== Partnership with Jakušina ===
In 2014, Nevskiy teamed up with Olga Jakušina to compete for Latvia. They decided to train under Svetlana Alexeeva, Elena Kustarova, and Olga Riabinina in Moscow. After winning bronze at the Tallinn Trophy in December 2014, they placed 26th at the 2015 European Championships in Stockholm, Sweden, and 29th at the 2015 World Championships in Shanghai, China.

Jakušina/Nevskiy received the silver medal at the Volvo Open Cup in November 2015. They ranked 22nd at the 2016 European Championships in Bratislava, Slovakia, and 29th at the 2016 World Championships in Boston, United States.

The duo placed 23rd at the 2017 European Championships in Ostrava, Czech Republic, and 29th at the 2017 World Championships in Helsinki, Finland.

Following the 2016–2017 season, Jakušina/Nevskiy decided to be coached by Alexander Zhulin in Moscow.

== Programs ==
With Jakušina

Season	Short dance	Free dance
2017–2018	Cha-cha: Faded; Rhumba: Latino Rhumba by Feminem feat. Alex; Samba: Music choreo. by Sergei Petukhov	Summertime by Al Jarrean; Just a Gigolo by Louis Prima choreo. by Sergei Petukhov
2016–2017	Blues: Temptation by Diana Krall; Swing: Mr. Swing choreo. by Elena Kustarova	Alexander by Vangelis choreo. by Elena Kustarova
2015–2016	Waltz: Maybe I, Maybe You by the Scorpions; Foxtrot: I Was Made for Lovin' You by Maria Mena choreo. by Elena Kustarova	Alexander by Vangelis choreo. by Elena Kustarova
2014–2015	Flamenco; Paso doble choreo. by Elena Kustarova	Jazz medley choreo. by Elena Kustarova

== Competitive highlights ==
CS: Challenger Series

=== With Jakušina for Latvia ===
International
Event	14–15	15–16	16–17	17–18
World Champ.	29th	29th	29th	
European Champ.	26th	22nd	23rd	
CS Denkova-Staviski		6th		
CS Mordovian		11th		
CS Nebelhorn				13th
CS Ondrej Nepela			11th	10th
CS Tallinn Trophy		10th	6th	
CS Volvo Open Cup	5th			
Ice Star	6th			
Tallinn Trophy	3rd			
Volvo Open Cup		2nd	4th	
National
Latvian Champ.	1st			

=== With Baturintseva for Russia ===
International
Event	2012–13
Golden Spin of Zagreb	16th
Ice Star	4th
National
Russian Championships	8th

=== With Mepillat for France ===
International
Event	2010–11
International Trophy of Lyon	20th J
National
French Junior Championships	19th
J = Junior level
