= Olga Jakušina =

Latvian ice dancer (born 1997)

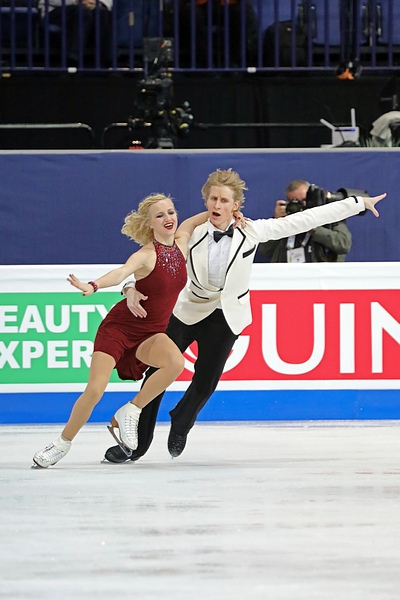

Personal information
- Other names: Jakushina/Yakushina
- Born: 26 May 1997 (age 29) Jelgava, Latvia
- Height: 1.70 m (5 ft 7 in)

Figure skating career
- Country: Latvia
- Partner: Andrey Nevskiy
- Coach: Alexander Zhulin
- Skating club: Kristal Ice FSC
- Began skating: 2001

Olga Jakušina (born 26 May 1997) is a Latvian ice dancer. With Andrey Nevskiy, she is the 2015 Volvo Open Cup silver medalist and 2014 Tallinn Trophy bronze medalist. They have competed at three World Championships.

== Career ==
=== Early years ===
Jakušina began learning to skate in 2001. Around 2007, she teamed up with Ihar Ahai (also transcribed Igor Ogay) from Belarus. The two placed tenth on the novice level at the 2008 NRW Trophy.

=== Partnership with Grishin ===
Around 2011, Jakušina teamed up with Russian-born Aleksandr Grishin (Latvian: Aleksandrs Grišins). The duo debuted on the ISU Junior Grand Prix series in early September 2011. They placed 28th in the short dance at the 2013 World Junior Championships in Milan, Italy.

The Toruń Cup in January 2014 was their final international competition together. The two were coached by Alexander Zhulin, Oleg Volkov, and Gennadi Akkerman in Russia.

=== Partnership with Nevskiy ===
In 2014, Jakušina teamed up with Russia's Andrey Nevskiy (Latvian: Andrejs Ņevskis). They decided to train under Svetlana Alexeeva, Elena Kustarova, and Olga Riabinina in Moscow. After winning bronze at the Tallinn Trophy in December 2014, they placed 26th at the 2015 European Championships in Stockholm, Sweden, and 29th at the 2015 World Championships in Shanghai, China.

Jakušina/Nevskiy received the silver medal at the Volvo Open Cup in November 2015. They ranked 22nd at the 2016 European Championships in Bratislava, Slovakia, and 29th at the 2016 World Championships in Boston, United States.

The duo placed 23rd at the 2017 European Championships in Ostrava, Czech Republic, and 29th at the 2017 World Championships in Helsinki, Finland.

Following the 2016–2017 season, Jakušina/Nevskiy decided to be coached by Alexander Zhulin in Moscow.

== Programs ==
=== With Nevskiy ===
Season	Short dance	Free dance
2017–2018	Cha-cha: Faded; Rhumba: Latino Rhumba by Feminem feat. Alex; Samba: Music choreo. by Sergei Petukhov	Summertime by Al Jarrean; Just a Gigolo by Louis Prima choreo. by Sergei Petukhov
2016–2017	Blues: Temptation by Diana Krall; Swing: Mr. Swing choreo. by Elena Kustarova	Alexander by Vangelis choreo. by Elena Kustarova
2015–2016	Waltz: Maybe I, Maybe You by the Scorpions; Foxtrot: I Was Made for Lovin' You by Maria Mena choreo. by Elena Kustarova	Alexander by Vangelis choreo. by Elena Kustarova
2014–2015	Flamenco; Paso doble choreo. by Elena Kustarova	Jazz medley choreo. by Elena Kustarova

=== With Grishin ===
Season	Short dance	Free dance
2013–2014	Sweet Dreams (Are Made of This)	Ramalama Bang Bang by Róisín Murphy; Traversy; Ramalama Bang Bang by Róisín Murphy choreo. by Sergei Petukhov
2012–2013	Blues: Ain't No Sunshine; Quickstep choreo. by Sergei Petukhov	Ramalama Bang Bang by Róisín Murphy; Traversy; Ramalama Bang Bang by Róisín Murphy choreo. by Sergei Petukhov
2011–2012	Cha-cha: Smooth by Carlos Santana; Samba: Dirty Dancing: Havana Nights choreo. by Alexander Zhulin	Kill Bill: Volume 1 choreo. by Alexander Zhulin

== Competitive highlights ==
CS: Challenger Series; JGP: Junior Grand Prix

=== With Nevskiy ===
International
Event	14–15	15–16	16–17	17–18
World Champ.	29th	29th	29th	
European Champ.	26th	22nd	23rd	
CS Denkova-Staviski		6th		
CS Mordovian		11th		
CS Nebelhorn				13th
CS Ondrej Nepela			11th	10th
CS Tallinn Trophy		10th	6th	
CS Volvo Open Cup	5th			
Ice Star	6th			
Tallinn Trophy	3rd			
Volvo Open Cup		2nd	4th	
National
Latvian Champ.	1st			

=== With Grishin ===
International
Event	11–12 (AG)	12–13 (AG)	13–14 (AG)
World Junior Champ.		28th	
JGP Austria		13th	
JGP Estonia	16th		12th
JGP Latvia	17th		10th
Ice Star			9th J
Istanbul Cup	7th J		
Toruń Cup			8th J
Volvo Open Cup		6th J	
NRW Trophy			
