= Jessica Lee (figure skater) =

American professional figure skater (born 1999)

Jessica Lee (born December 12, 1999) is an American professional figure skater.

== Career ==
She and her previous partner, Robert Hennings, are the 2014 International Challenge Cup Junior Pairs Champions, the 2014 US National Novice Pairs Bronze Medalists, and the 2014 Pacific Coast Sectional Novice Pairs Silver Medalists. Also with Hennings, Lee competed at two Junior Grand Prix events in Tallinn, Estonia and Zagreb, Croatia and placed 11th and 9th, respectively. In October 2014, after their two Junior Grand Prix events, Lee and Hennings ended their partnership.

Lee and Kozlowski teamed up in April 2015 and competed as a Junior pair team in the 2015-2016 season.

In September 2017, Lee retired from competitive skating and joined Disney On Ice as a professional figure skater. She currently portrays the role of Anna in Disney On Ice presents "Celebrate Memories."

== Programs ==
with Kozlowski

| Season | Short program | Free skating |
|---|---|---|
| 2015–2016 | Jump Swing Blues by Rick Krive | La Strada by Nino Rojas |

with Hennings

| Season | Short program | Free skating |
|---|---|---|
| 2014–2015 | Espana Cani | Buster's Big Opening; Movie Studio by Danny Elfman |

== Results ==
with Kozlowski

National
| Event | 2013-14 |
|---|---|
| U.S. Championships | 10th J. |
| Pacific Coast Sectional | 3rd J. |
J = Junior level

with Hennings

International Junior
| Event | 2013-14 | 2014–15 |
|---|---|---|
| International Challenge Cup | 1st J. | |
| JGP Croatia | | 9th |
| JGP Tallinn | | 11th |
National
| U.S. Championships | 3rd N. | |
| Pacific Coast Sectional | 2nd N. | |
N = Novice level; J = Junior level
