= 2012–13 ISU World Standings and Season's World Ranking =

Merit-based ice skating ranking

Season-end No. 1 skaters
- Men's singles: (Canada) Patrick Chan
- Ladies' singles: (Italy) Carolina Kostner
- Pairs: (Russia) Tatiana Volosozhar / Maxim Trankov
- Ice dance: (United States) Meryl Davis / Charlie White

Season's No. 1 skaters
- Men's singles: (Canada) Patrick Chan
- Ladies' singles: (Japan) Mao Asada
- Pairs: (Russia) Tatiana Volosozhar / Maxim Trankov
- Ice dance: (United States) Meryl Davis / Charlie White

Navigation

The 2012–13 ISU World Standings and Season's World Ranking, are the World Standings and Season's World Ranking published by the International Skating Union (ISU) during the 2012–13 season.

The 2012–13 ISU World Standings for single & pair skating and ice dance, are taking into account results of the 2010–11, 2011–12 and 2012–13 seasons.

The 2012–13 ISU Season's World Ranking is based on the results of the 2012–13 season only.

The 2012–13 ISU World standings for synchronized skating, are based on the results of the 2010–11, 2011–12 and 2012–13 seasons.

== World Standings for single & pair skating and ice dance ==
=== Season-end standings ===
The remainder of this section is a complete list, by discipline, published by the ISU.

==== Men's singles (177 skaters) ====
As of 20 April 2013

Rank	Nation	Skater	Points	Season	ISU Championships or Olympics	(Junior) Grand Prix and Final		Selected International Competition	
Rank	Nation	Skater	Points	Season	Best	Best	2nd Best	Best	2nd Best
1	CAN	Patrick Chan	4808	2012/2013 season (100%)	1200	648	400	0	0
1	CAN	Patrick Chan	4808	2011/2012 season (100%)	1200	800	400	0	0
1	CAN	Patrick Chan	4808	2010/2011 season (70%)	840	560	280	0	0
2	JPN	Yuzuru Hanyu	4450	2012/2013 season (100%)	875	720	400	250	0
2	JPN	Yuzuru Hanyu	4450	2011/2012 season (100%)	972	583	400	250	0
2	JPN	Yuzuru Hanyu	4450	2010/2011 season (70%)	529	204	149	0	0
3	JPN	Daisuke Takahashi	4117	2012/2013 season (100%)	709	800	360	0	0
3	JPN	Daisuke Takahashi	4117	2011/2012 season (100%)	1080	720	400	0	0
3	JPN	Daisuke Takahashi	4117	2010/2011 season (70%)	588	408	280	0	0
4	ESP	Javier Fernandez	3980	2012/2013 season (100%)	972	583	400	203	0
4	ESP	Javier Fernandez	3980	2011/2012 season (100%)	517	648	360	182	0
4	ESP	Javier Fernandez	3980	2010/2011 season (70%)	326	183	0	115	0
5	CZE	Michal Brezina	3610	2012/2013 season (100%)	680	324	236	225	164
5	CZE	Michal Brezina	3610	2011/2012 season (100%)	709	472	400	225	0
5	CZE	Michal Brezina	3610	2010/2011 season (70%)	613	0	0	175	158
6	KAZ	Denis Ten	3203	2012/2013 season (100%)	1080	236	0	250	0
6	KAZ	Denis Ten	3203	2011/2012 season (100%)	638	262	262	250	225
6	KAZ	Denis Ten	3203	2010/2011 season (70%)	213	0	0	0	0
7	JPN	Takahiko Kozuka	3163	2012/2013 season (100%)	0	525	400	250	0
7	JPN	Takahiko Kozuka	3163	2011/2012 season (100%)	418	360	324	0	0
7	JPN	Takahiko Kozuka	3163	2010/2011 season (70%)	756	454	280	0	0
8	RUS	Artur Gachinski	2938	2012/2013 season (100%)	0	213	0	250	0
8	RUS	Artur Gachinski	2938	2011/2012 season (100%)	756	262	262	0	0
8	RUS	Artur Gachinski	2938	2010/2011 season (70%)	680	165	149	175	175
9	USA	Jeremy Abbott	2822	2012/2013 season (100%)	0	360	262	0	0
9	USA	Jeremy Abbott	2822	2011/2012 season (100%)	574	525	400	225	0
9	USA	Jeremy Abbott	2822	2010/2011 season (70%)	476	252	227	0	0
10	FRA	Florent Amodio	2751	2012/2013 season (100%)	756	324	292	0	0
10	FRA	Florent Amodio	2751	2011/2012 season (100%)	787	262	0	0	0
10	FRA	Florent Amodio	2751	2010/2011 season (70%)	588	330	252	0	0
11	JPN	Takahito Mura	2630	2012/2013 season (100%)	574	400	191	0	0
11	JPN	Takahito Mura	2630	2011/2012 season (100%)	551	0	0	250	182
11	JPN	Takahito Mura	2630	2010/2011 season (70%)	0	165	0	175	142
12	JPN	Tatsuki Machida	2614	2012/2013 season (100%)	0	472	400	250	225
12	JPN	Tatsuki Machida	2614	2011/2012 season (100%)	446	213	0	250	0
12	JPN	Tatsuki Machida	2614	2010/2011 season (70%)	0	183	0	175	175
13	FRA	Brian Joubert	2483	2012/2013 season (100%)	612	292	0	250	0
13	FRA	Brian Joubert	2483	2011/2012 season (100%)	875	0	0	250	0
13	FRA	Brian Joubert	2483	2010/2011 season (70%)	529	204	0	0	0
14	JPN	Nobunari Oda	2446	2012/2013 season (100%)	0	324	262	250	250
14	JPN	Nobunari Oda	2446	2011/2012 season (100%)	0	360	213	0	0
14	JPN	Nobunari Oda	2446	2010/2011 season (70%)	496	504	252	0	0
15	USA	Ross Miner	2391	2012/2013 season (100%)	362	324	262	203	0
15	USA	Ross Miner	2391	2011/2012 season (100%)	680	324	236	0	0
15	USA	Ross Miner	2391	2010/2011 season (70%)	293	149	0	0	0
16	CAN	Kevin Reynolds	2339	2012/2013 season (100%)	840	262	236	182	0
16	CAN	Kevin Reynolds	2339	2011/2012 season (100%)	402	213	0	0	0
16	CAN	Kevin Reynolds	2339	2010/2011 season (70%)	205	204	204	0	0
17	CZE	Tomáš Verner	2331	2012/2013 season (100%)	293	191	191	203	0
17	CZE	Tomáš Verner	2331	2011/2012 season (100%)	551	262	0	0	0
17	CZE	Tomáš Verner	2331	2010/2011 season (70%)	476	368	280	0	0
18	USA	Adam Rippon	2326	2012/2013 season (100%)	0	292	191	225	0
18	USA	Adam Rippon	2326	2011/2012 season (100%)	612	292	292	0	0
18	USA	Adam Rippon	2326	2010/2011 season (70%)	386	227	204	0	0
19	RUS	Konstantin Menshov	2251	2012/2013 season (100%)	0	292	292	250	225
19	RUS	Konstantin Menshov	2251	2011/2012 season (100%)	0	236	191	250	203
19	RUS	Konstantin Menshov	2251	2010/2011 season (70%)	312	0	0	158	158
20	SWE	Alexander Majorov	2214	2012/2013 season (100%)	496	0	0	250	250
20	SWE	Alexander Majorov	2214	2011/2012 season (100%)	293	236	0	250	182
20	SWE	Alexander Majorov	2214	2010/2011 season (70%)	284	142	115	175	175
21	CHN	Han Yan	2191	2012/2013 season (100%)	680	225	164	0	0
21	CHN	Han Yan	2191	2011/2012 season (100%)	500	315	250	0	0
21	CHN	Han Yan	2191	2010/2011 season (70%)	207	221	175	0	0
22	USA	Richard Dornbush	2173	2012/2013 season (100%)	551	262	236	225	0
22	USA	Richard Dornbush	2173	2011/2012 season (100%)	237	292	236	0	0
22	USA	Richard Dornbush	2173	2010/2011 season (70%)	362	245	175	0	0
23	USA	Joshua Farris	2049	2012/2013 season (100%)	500	315	250	0	0
23	USA	Joshua Farris	2049	2011/2012 season (100%)	450	284	250	0	0
23	USA	Joshua Farris	2049	2010/2011 season (70%)	0	175	158	0	0
24	USA	Jason Brown	1960	2012/2013 season (100%)	450	255	250	0	0
24	USA	Jason Brown	1960	2011/2012 season (100%)	405	350	250	0	0
24	USA	Jason Brown	1960	2010/2011 season (70%)	186	158	104	0	0
25	CHN	Nan Song	1912	2012/2013 season (100%)	496	262	0	0	0
25	CHN	Nan Song	1912	2011/2012 season (100%)	305	360	324	0	0
25	CHN	Nan Song	1912	2010/2011 season (70%)	253	165	0	0	0
26	FRA	Chafik Besseghier	1882	2012/2013 season (100%)	362	213	0	203	182
26	FRA	Chafik Besseghier	1882	2011/2012 season (100%)	264	0	0	250	225
26	FRA	Chafik Besseghier	1882	2010/2011 season (70%)	0	183	0	175	0
27	USA	Max Aaron	1843	2012/2013 season (100%)	638	0	0	250	225
27	USA	Max Aaron	1843	2011/2012 season (100%)	0	0	0	164	0
27	USA	Max Aaron	1843	2010/2011 season (70%)	230	178	158	0	0
28	GER	Peter Liebers	1661	2012/2013 season (100%)	418	0	0	250	250
28	GER	Peter Liebers	1661	2011/2012 season (100%)	192	0	0	225	164
28	GER	Peter Liebers	1661	2010/2011 season (70%)	205	149	0	142	127
29	RUS	Maxim Kovtun	1656	2012/2013 season (100%)	551	350	250	0	0
29	RUS	Maxim Kovtun	1656	2011/2012 season (100%)	0	255	250	0	0
29	RUS	Maxim Kovtun	1656	2010/2011 season (70%)	0	0	0	0	0
30	BEL	Jorik Hendrickx	1646	2012/2013 season (100%)	180	0	0	250	182
30	BEL	Jorik Hendrickx	1646	2011/2012 season (100%)	362	0	0	250	225
30	BEL	Jorik Hendrickx	1646	2010/2011 season (70%)	126	104	93	115	0
31	RUS	Sergei Voronov	1521	2012/2013 season (100%)	446	324	213	0	0
31	RUS	Sergei Voronov	1521	2011/2012 season (100%)	325	213	0	0	0
31	RUS	Sergei Voronov	1521	2010/2011 season (70%)	0	0	0	0	0
32	UZB	Misha Ge	1512	2012/2013 season (100%)	293	0	0	225	182
32	UZB	Misha Ge	1512	2011/2012 season (100%)	362	0	0	225	225
32	UZB	Misha Ge	1512	2010/2011 season (70%)	185	0	0	0	0
32	CAN	Andrei Rogozine	1512	2012/2013 season (100%)	339	0	0	0	0
32	CAN	Andrei Rogozine	1512	2011/2012 season (100%)	0	236	213	0	0
32	CAN	Andrei Rogozine	1512	2010/2011 season (70%)	350	199	175	0	0
34	USA	Armin Mahbanoozadeh	1498	2012/2013 season (100%)	0	213	0	225	203
34	USA	Armin Mahbanoozadeh	1498	2011/2012 season (100%)	0	191	0	0	0
34	USA	Armin Mahbanoozadeh	1498	2010/2011 season (70%)	312	227	0	127	0
35	JPN	Keiji Tanaka	1445	2012/2013 season (100%)	0	225	207	0	0
35	JPN	Keiji Tanaka	1445	2011/2012 season (100%)	266	225	207	0	0
35	JPN	Keiji Tanaka	1445	2010/2011 season (70%)	315	142	104	0	0
36	KAZ	Abzal Rakimgaliev	1405	2012/2013 season (100%)	192	0	0	225	164
36	KAZ	Abzal Rakimgaliev	1405	2011/2012 season (100%)	140	0	0	250	182
36	KAZ	Abzal Rakimgaliev	1405	2010/2011 season (70%)	166	142	84	142	127
37	JPN	Ryuju Hino	1398	2012/2013 season (100%)	194	284	225	0	0
37	JPN	Ryuju Hino	1398	2011/2012 season (100%)	215	250	230	0	0
37	JPN	Ryuju Hino	1398	2010/2011 season (70%)	0	104	0	0	0
38	JPN	Daisuke Murakami	1347	2012/2013 season (100%)	0	0	0	225	203
38	JPN	Daisuke Murakami	1347	2011/2012 season (100%)	0	236	0	250	250
38	JPN	Daisuke Murakami	1347	2010/2011 season (70%)	0	183	0	158	115
39	PHI	Michael Christian Martinez	1345	2012/2013 season (100%)	328	182	148	250	203
39	PHI	Michael Christian Martinez	1345	2011/2012 season (100%)	114	120	0	0	0
39	PHI	Michael Christian Martinez	1345	2010/2011 season (70%)	0	0	0	0	0
40	USA	Keegan Messing	1295	2012/2013 season (100%)	0	0	0	250	203
40	USA	Keegan Messing	1295	2011/2012 season (100%)	0	0	0	250	0
40	USA	Keegan Messing	1295	2010/2011 season (70%)	256	175	161	0	0
41	GER	Martin Rappe	1290	2012/2013 season (100%)	174	164	108	0	0
41	GER	Martin Rappe	1290	2011/2012 season (100%)	174	148	133	225	164
41	GER	Martin Rappe	1290	2010/2011 season (70%)	0	76	0	0	0
42	MON	Kim Lucine	1268	2012/2013 season (100%)	264	0	0	203	0
42	MON	Kim Lucine	1268	2011/2012 season (100%)	237	0	0	203	203
42	MON	Kim Lucine	1268	2010/2011 season (70%)	109	0	0	158	127
43	CHN	Jinlin Guan	1255	2012/2013 season (100%)	0	236	213	0	0
43	CHN	Jinlin Guan	1255	2011/2012 season (100%)	325	0	0	0	0
43	CHN	Jinlin Guan	1255	2010/2011 season (70%)	347	134	0	0	0
44	JPN	Shoma Uno	1218	2012/2013 season (100%)	266	225	148	0	0
44	JPN	Shoma Uno	1218	2011/2012 season (100%)	194	203	182	0	0
44	JPN	Shoma Uno	1218	2010/2011 season (70%)	0	0	0	0	0
45	FRA	Romain Ponsart	1217	2012/2013 season (100%)	0	0	0	182	182
45	FRA	Romain Ponsart	1217	2011/2012 season (100%)	0	191	0	203	164
45	FRA	Romain Ponsart	1217	2010/2011 season (70%)	65	115	115	115	0
46	ROU	Zoltán Kelemen	1210	2012/2013 season (100%)	140	0	0	225	203
46	ROU	Zoltán Kelemen	1210	2011/2012 season (100%)	214	0	0	225	203
46	ROU	Zoltán Kelemen	1210	2010/2011 season (70%)	71	0	0	158	0
47	ITA	Paolo Bacchini	1194	2012/2013 season (100%)	0	0	0	250	203
47	ITA	Paolo Bacchini	1194	2011/2012 season (100%)	173	0	0	225	0
47	ITA	Paolo Bacchini	1194	2010/2011 season (70%)	185	0	0	158	158
48	USA	Shotaro Omori	1115	2012/2013 season (100%)	405	182	182	0	0
48	USA	Shotaro Omori	1115	2011/2012 season (100%)	0	182	164	0	0
48	USA	Shotaro Omori	1115	2010/2011 season (70%)	0	0	0	0	0
49	RUS	Zhan Bush	1105	2012/2013 season (100%)	0	191	0	164	0
49	RUS	Zhan Bush	1105	2011/2012 season (100%)	328	0	0	0	0
49	RUS	Zhan Bush	1105	2010/2011 season (70%)	122	158	142	0	0
50	AUT	Viktor Pfeifer	1085	2012/2013 season (100%)	402	0	0	0	0
50	AUT	Viktor Pfeifer	1085	2011/2012 season (100%)	140	0	0	225	203
50	AUT	Viktor Pfeifer	1085	2010/2011 season (70%)	98	0	0	115	0
51	CHN	He Zhang	1043	2012/2013 season (100%)	215	0	0	0	0
51	CHN	He Zhang	1043	2011/2012 season (100%)	295	225	164	0	0
51	CHN	He Zhang	1043	2010/2011 season (70%)	0	76	68	0	0
52	DEN	Justus Strid	999	2012/2013 season (100%)	106	0	0	225	203
52	DEN	Justus Strid	999	2011/2012 season (100%)	113	0	0	225	0
52	DEN	Justus Strid	999	2010/2011 season (70%)	0	0	0	127	0
53	RUS	Artur Dmitriev	986	2012/2013 season (100%)	0	0	0	0	0
53	RUS	Artur Dmitriev	986	2011/2012 season (100%)	127	225	182	0	0
53	RUS	Artur Dmitriev	986	2010/2011 season (70%)	167	158	127	0	0
54	SWE	Adrian Schultheiss	959	2012/2013 season (100%)	0	0	0	0	0
54	SWE	Adrian Schultheiss	959	2011/2012 season (100%)	0	0	0	164	164
54	SWE	Adrian Schultheiss	959	2010/2011 season (70%)	166	149	0	158	158
55	GER	Denis Wieczorek	898	2012/2013 season (100%)	0	0	0	182	182
55	GER	Denis Wieczorek	898	2011/2012 season (100%)	0	0	0	182	0
55	GER	Denis Wieczorek	898	2010/2011 season (70%)	79	115	0	158	0
56	KOR	June Hyoung Lee	896	2012/2013 season (100%)	156	164	108	0	0
56	KOR	June Hyoung Lee	896	2011/2012 season (100%)	83	203	182	0	0
56	KOR	June Hyoung Lee	896	2010/2011 season (70%)	0	0	0	0	0
57	SUI	Stephane Walker	878	2012/2013 season (100%)	113	0	0	203	182
57	SUI	Stephane Walker	878	2011/2012 season (100%)	0	0	0	164	164
57	SUI	Stephane Walker	878	2010/2011 season (70%)	52	0	0	0	0
58	USA	Timothy Dolensky	851	2012/2013 season (100%)	0	0	0	182	0
58	USA	Timothy Dolensky	851	2011/2012 season (100%)	157	203	182	0	0
58	USA	Timothy Dolensky	851	2010/2011 season (70%)	0	127	0	0	0
59	RUS	Mikhail Kolyada	850	2012/2013 season (100%)	295	148	0	225	0
59	RUS	Mikhail Kolyada	850	2011/2012 season (100%)	0	182	0	0	0
59	RUS	Mikhail Kolyada	850	2010/2011 season (70%)	0	0	0	0	0
60	PHI	Christopher Caluza	845	2012/2013 season (100%)	214	0	0	164	0
60	PHI	Christopher Caluza	845	2011/2012 season (100%)	264	0	0	203	0
60	PHI	Christopher Caluza	845	2010/2011 season (70%)	0	0	0	0	0
60	CHN	Boyang Jin	845	2012/2013 season (100%)	365	250	230	0	0
60	CHN	Boyang Jin	845	2011/2012 season (100%)	0	0	0	0	0
60	CHN	Boyang Jin	845	2010/2011 season (70%)	0	0	0	0	0
62	RUS	Evgeni Plushenko	840	2012/2013 season (100%)	0	0	0	0	0
62	RUS	Evgeni Plushenko	840	2011/2012 season (100%)	840	0	0	0	0
62	RUS	Evgeni Plushenko	840	2010/2011 season (70%)	0	0	0	0	0
63	USA	Douglas Razzano	821	2012/2013 season (100%)	0	0	0	225	0
63	USA	Douglas Razzano	821	2011/2012 season (100%)	0	213	0	225	0
63	USA	Douglas Razzano	821	2010/2011 season (70%)	0	0	0	158	0
64	CAN	Nam Nguyen	812	2012/2013 season (100%)	157	203	108	0	0
64	CAN	Nam Nguyen	812	2011/2012 season (100%)	141	203	0	0	0
64	CAN	Nam Nguyen	812	2010/2011 season (70%)	0	0	0	0	0
65	CHN	Jialiang Wu	794	2012/2013 season (100%)	0	0	0	0	0
65	CHN	Jialiang Wu	794	2011/2012 season (100%)	173	191	0	0	0
65	CHN	Jialiang Wu	794	2010/2011 season (70%)	281	149	0	0	0
66	ITA	Maurizio Zandron	753	2012/2013 season (100%)	0	0	0	0	0
66	ITA	Maurizio Zandron	753	2011/2012 season (100%)	68	133	120	182	182
66	ITA	Maurizio Zandron	753	2010/2011 season (70%)	0	68	0	0	0
67	CAN	Liam Firus	747	2012/2013 season (100%)	0	0	0	0	0
67	CAN	Liam Firus	747	2011/2012 season (100%)	239	203	0	0	0
67	CAN	Liam Firus	747	2010/2011 season (70%)	48	142	115	0	0
68	JPN	Ryuichi Kihara	731	2012/2013 season (100%)	0	0	0	0	0
68	JPN	Ryuichi Kihara	731	2011/2012 season (100%)	0	203	182	0	0
68	JPN	Ryuichi Kihara	731	2010/2011 season (70%)	136	142	68	0	0
69	GER	Franz Streubel	719	2012/2013 season (100%)	0	0	0	182	0
69	GER	Franz Streubel	719	2011/2012 season (100%)	0	0	0	250	203
69	GER	Franz Streubel	719	2010/2011 season (70%)	0	84	0	0	0
70	FRA	Alban Préaubert	718	2012/2013 season (100%)	0	0	0	0	0
70	FRA	Alban Préaubert	718	2011/2012 season (100%)	0	0	0	0	0
70	FRA	Alban Préaubert	718	2010/2011 season (70%)	228	183	165	142	0
71	GER	Paul Fentz	717	2012/2013 season (100%)	0	0	0	225	203
71	GER	Paul Fentz	717	2011/2012 season (100%)	156	133	0	0	0
71	GER	Paul Fentz	717	2010/2011 season (70%)	0	0	0	0	0
72	EST	Viktor Romanenkov	700	2012/2013 season (100%)	156	108	97	0	0
72	EST	Viktor Romanenkov	700	2011/2012 season (100%)	83	148	108	0	0
72	EST	Viktor Romanenkov	700	2010/2011 season (70%)	58	84	0	0	0
73	JPN	Kento Nakamura	677	2012/2013 season (100%)	0	0	0	225	0
73	JPN	Kento Nakamura	677	2011/2012 season (100%)	0	0	0	203	0
73	JPN	Kento Nakamura	677	2010/2011 season (70%)	89	84	76	0	0
74	CZE	Petr Coufal	674	2012/2013 season (100%)	0	182	133	0	0
74	CZE	Petr Coufal	674	2011/2012 season (100%)	93	120	0	0	0
74	CZE	Petr Coufal	674	2010/2011 season (70%)	53	93	84	0	0
75	RUS	Gordei Gorshkov	661	2012/2013 season (100%)	0	0	0	0	0
75	RUS	Gordei Gorshkov	661	2011/2012 season (100%)	0	225	0	0	0
75	RUS	Gordei Gorshkov	661	2010/2011 season (70%)	151	158	127	0	0
75	USA	Brandon Mroz	661	2012/2013 season (100%)	0	0	0	182	0
75	USA	Brandon Mroz	661	2011/2012 season (100%)	0	0	0	0	0
75	USA	Brandon Mroz	661	2010/2011 season (70%)	0	252	227	0	0
77	POL	Maciej Cieplucha	658	2012/2013 season (100%)	126	0	0	203	0
77	POL	Maciej Cieplucha	658	2011/2012 season (100%)	126	0	0	203	0
77	POL	Maciej Cieplucha	658	2010/2011 season (70%)	0	0	0	0	0
78	RUS	Vladislav Sesganov	650	2012/2013 season (100%)	0	0	0	250	0
78	RUS	Vladislav Sesganov	650	2011/2012 season (100%)	0	0	0	225	0
78	RUS	Vladislav Sesganov	650	2010/2011 season (70%)	0	0	0	175	0
79	CZE	Pavel Kaska	646	2012/2013 season (100%)	0	0	0	225	0
79	CZE	Pavel Kaska	646	2011/2012 season (100%)	0	0	0	164	0
79	CZE	Pavel Kaska	646	2010/2011 season (70%)	0	0	0	142	115
80	RUS	Alexander Samarin	645	2012/2013 season (100%)	239	203	203	0	0
80	RUS	Alexander Samarin	645	2011/2012 season (100%)	0	0	0	0	0
80	RUS	Alexander Samarin	645	2010/2011 season (70%)	0	0	0	0	0
81	USA	Stephen Carriere	635	2012/2013 season (100%)	0	0	0	182	0
81	USA	Stephen Carriere	635	2011/2012 season (100%)	0	0	0	250	203
81	USA	Stephen Carriere	635	2010/2011 season (70%)	0	0	0	0	0
82	ISR	Alexei Bychenko	634	2012/2013 season (100%)	214	0	0	164	164
82	ISR	Alexei Bychenko	634	2011/2012 season (100%)	92	0	0	0	0
82	ISR	Alexei Bychenko	634	2010/2011 season (70%)	0	0	0	0	0
83	JPN	Yoji Tsuboi	611	2012/2013 season (100%)	0	0	0	182	0
83	JPN	Yoji Tsuboi	611	2011/2012 season (100%)	0	133	0	203	0
83	JPN	Yoji Tsuboi	611	2010/2011 season (70%)	0	93	0	0	0
84	UKR	Anton Kovalevski	591	2012/2013 season (100%)	0	0	0	0	0
84	UKR	Anton Kovalevski	591	2011/2012 season (100%)	0	0	0	0	0
84	UKR	Anton Kovalevski	591	2010/2011 season (70%)	173	134	0	142	142
85	BLR	Pavel Ignatenko	587	2012/2013 season (100%)	237	133	0	0	0
85	BLR	Pavel Ignatenko	587	2011/2012 season (100%)	0	120	97	0	0
85	BLR	Pavel Ignatenko	587	2010/2011 season (70%)	0	0	0	0	0
86	ESP	Javier Raya	570	2012/2013 season (100%)	173	0	0	0	0
86	ESP	Javier Raya	570	2011/2012 season (100%)	106	0	0	164	0
86	ESP	Javier Raya	570	2010/2011 season (70%)	88	0	0	127	0
87	RUS	Ivan Bariev	549	2012/2013 season (100%)	0	0	0	164	0
87	RUS	Ivan Bariev	549	2011/2012 season (100%)	0	0	0	203	182
87	RUS	Ivan Bariev	549	2010/2011 season (70%)	0	0	0	0	0
88	USA	Harrison Choate	533	2012/2013 season (100%)	0	203	182	0	0
88	USA	Harrison Choate	533	2011/2012 season (100%)	0	148	0	0	0
88	USA	Harrison Choate	533	2010/2011 season (70%)	0	0	0	0	0
89	JPN	Sei Kawahara	529	2012/2013 season (100%)	0	164	120	0	0
89	JPN	Sei Kawahara	529	2011/2012 season (100%)	0	148	97	0	0
89	JPN	Sei Kawahara	529	2010/2011 season (70%)	0	68	0	0	0
90	KOR	Jin Seo Kim	511	2012/2013 season (100%)	126	203	182	0	0
90	KOR	Jin Seo Kim	511	2011/2012 season (100%)	0	0	0	0	0
90	KOR	Jin Seo Kim	511	2010/2011 season (70%)	0	0	0	0	0
91	RUS	Artem Borodulin	510	2012/2013 season (100%)	0	0	0	164	164
91	RUS	Artem Borodulin	510	2011/2012 season (100%)	0	0	0	182	0
91	RUS	Artem Borodulin	510	2010/2011 season (70%)	0	0	0	0	0
92	GBR	Harry Mattick	479	2012/2013 season (100%)	0	0	0	164	164
92	GBR	Harry Mattick	479	2011/2012 season (100%)	75	0	0	0	0
92	GBR	Harry Mattick	479	2010/2011 season (70%)	0	76	0	0	0
93	CHN	Yi Wang	473	2012/2013 season (100%)	237	236	0	0	0
93	CHN	Yi Wang	473	2011/2012 season (100%)	0	0	0	0	0
93	CHN	Yi Wang	473	2010/2011 season (70%)	0	0	0	0	0
94	USA	Jay Yostanto	460	2012/2013 season (100%)	0	148	148	0	0
94	USA	Jay Yostanto	460	2011/2012 season (100%)	0	164	0	0	0
94	USA	Jay Yostanto	460	2010/2011 season (70%)	0	0	0	0	0
95	KOR	Dong-Won Lee	455	2012/2013 season (100%)	0	0	0	0	0
95	KOR	Dong-Won Lee	455	2011/2012 season (100%)	0	164	164	0	0
95	KOR	Dong-Won Lee	455	2010/2011 season (70%)	0	127	0	0	0
95	FRA	Thomas Sosniak	455	2012/2013 season (100%)	0	0	0	0	0
95	FRA	Thomas Sosniak	455	2011/2012 season (100%)	0	97	0	0	0
95	FRA	Thomas Sosniak	455	2010/2011 season (70%)	0	127	104	127	0
97	GER	Christopher Berneck	453	2012/2013 season (100%)	0	0	0	203	0
97	GER	Christopher Berneck	453	2011/2012 season (100%)	0	108	0	0	0
97	GER	Christopher Berneck	453	2010/2011 season (70%)	0	0	0	142	0
98	SUI	Mikael Redin	439	2012/2013 season (100%)	0	0	0	0	0
98	SUI	Mikael Redin	439	2011/2012 season (100%)	0	0	0	182	0
98	SUI	Mikael Redin	439	2010/2011 season (70%)	0	0	0	142	115
99	ITA	Paul Bonifacio Parkinson	433	2012/2013 season (100%)	0	0	0	164	0
99	ITA	Paul Bonifacio Parkinson	433	2011/2012 season (100%)	0	0	0	0	0
99	ITA	Paul Bonifacio Parkinson	433	2010/2011 season (70%)	0	0	0	142	127
100	UKR	Yakov Godorozha	432	2012/2013 season (100%)	192	0	0	0	0
100	UKR	Yakov Godorozha	432	2011/2012 season (100%)	0	120	120	0	0
100	UKR	Yakov Godorozha	432	2010/2011 season (70%)	0	0	0	0	0
101	HKG	Ronald Lam	428	2012/2013 season (100%)	0	0	0	225	203
101	HKG	Ronald Lam	428	2011/2012 season (100%)	0	0	0	0	0
101	HKG	Ronald Lam	428	2010/2011 season (70%)	0	0	0	0	0
102	CHN	Jiaxing Liu	419	2012/2013 season (100%)	0	0	0	0	0
102	CHN	Jiaxing Liu	419	2011/2012 season (100%)	0	164	0	0	0
102	CHN	Jiaxing Liu	419	2010/2011 season (70%)	72	115	68	0	0
103	FIN	Matthias Versluis	408	2012/2013 season (100%)	75	0	0	0	0
103	FIN	Matthias Versluis	408	2011/2012 season (100%)	61	108	0	164	0
103	FIN	Matthias Versluis	408	2010/2011 season (70%)	0	0	0	0	0
104	FIN	Viktor Zubik	405	2012/2013 season (100%)	0	0	0	0	0
104	FIN	Viktor Zubik	405	2011/2012 season (100%)	0	108	0	182	0
104	FIN	Viktor Zubik	405	2010/2011 season (70%)	0	0	0	115	0
105	UKR	Stanislav Pertsov	401	2012/2013 season (100%)	0	0	0	0	0
105	UKR	Stanislav Pertsov	401	2011/2012 season (100%)	0	120	97	0	0
105	UKR	Stanislav Pertsov	401	2010/2011 season (70%)	80	104	0	0	0
106	RUS	Alexander Petrov	389	2012/2013 season (100%)	0	225	164	0	0
106	RUS	Alexander Petrov	389	2011/2012 season (100%)	0	0	0	0	0
106	RUS	Alexander Petrov	389	2010/2011 season (70%)	0	0	0	0	0
107	FRA	Charles Tetar	363	2012/2013 season (100%)	0	133	133	0	0
107	FRA	Charles Tetar	363	2011/2012 season (100%)	0	97	0	0	0
107	FRA	Charles Tetar	363	2010/2011 season (70%)	0	0	0	0	0
108	RUS	Vladislav Tarasenko	361	2012/2013 season (100%)	0	120	0	0	0
108	RUS	Vladislav Tarasenko	361	2011/2012 season (100%)	0	148	0	0	0
108	RUS	Vladislav Tarasenko	361	2010/2011 season (70%)	0	93	0	0	0
109	JPN	Akio Sasaki	357	2012/2013 season (100%)	0	0	0	182	0
109	JPN	Akio Sasaki	357	2011/2012 season (100%)	0	0	0	0	0
109	JPN	Akio Sasaki	357	2010/2011 season (70%)	0	0	0	175	0
110	CAN	Mitchell Gordon	356	2012/2013 season (100%)	103	120	0	0	0
110	CAN	Mitchell Gordon	356	2011/2012 season (100%)	0	133	0	0	0
110	CAN	Mitchell Gordon	356	2010/2011 season (70%)	0	0	0	0	0
111	CAN	Elladj Balde	353	2012/2013 season (100%)	140	213	0	0	0
111	CAN	Elladj Balde	353	2011/2012 season (100%)	0	0	0	0	0
111	CAN	Elladj Balde	353	2010/2011 season (70%)	0	0	0	0	0
112	BRA	Luiz Manella	350	2012/2013 season (100%)	114	0	0	0	0
112	BRA	Luiz Manella	350	2011/2012 season (100%)	103	133	0	0	0
112	BRA	Luiz Manella	350	2010/2011 season (70%)	0	0	0	0	0
113	CAN	Jeremy Ten	348	2012/2013 season (100%)	0	0	0	0	0
113	CAN	Jeremy Ten	348	2011/2012 season (100%)	214	0	0	0	0
113	CAN	Jeremy Ten	348	2010/2011 season (70%)	0	134	0	0	0
114	GBR	David Richardson	346	2012/2013 season (100%)	0	0	0	182	164
114	GBR	David Richardson	346	2011/2012 season (100%)	0	0	0	0	0
114	GBR	David Richardson	346	2010/2011 season (70%)	0	0	0	0	0
115	RUS	Andrei Zuber	328	2012/2013 season (100%)	0	164	164	0	0
115	RUS	Andrei Zuber	328	2011/2012 season (100%)	0	0	0	0	0
115	RUS	Andrei Zuber	328	2010/2011 season (70%)	0	0	0	0	0
116	ITA	Antonio Panfili	327	2012/2013 season (100%)	55	108	0	0	0
116	ITA	Antonio Panfili	327	2011/2012 season (100%)	0	0	0	164	0
116	ITA	Antonio Panfili	327	2010/2011 season (70%)	0	0	0	0	0
117	KOR	Min-Seok Kim	326	2012/2013 season (100%)	113	0	0	0	0
117	KOR	Min-Seok Kim	326	2011/2012 season (100%)	192	0	0	0	0
117	KOR	Min-Seok Kim	326	2010/2011 season (70%)	134	0	0	0	0
117	SWE	Ondrej Spiegl	326	2012/2013 season (100%)	0	0	0	182	0
117	SWE	Ondrej Spiegl	326	2011/2012 season (100%)	0	0	0	0	0
117	SWE	Ondrej Spiegl	326	2010/2011 season (70%)	0	76	68	0	0
119	RUS	Mark Shakhmatov	309	2012/2013 season (100%)	0	0	0	225	0
119	RUS	Mark Shakhmatov	309	2011/2012 season (100%)	0	0	0	0	0
119	RUS	Mark Shakhmatov	309	2010/2011 season (70%)	0	84	0	0	0
120	UKR	Ivan Pavlov	308	2012/2013 season (100%)	68	120	120	0	0
120	UKR	Ivan Pavlov	308	2011/2012 season (100%)	0	0	0	0	0
120	UKR	Ivan Pavlov	308	2010/2011 season (70%)	0	0	0	0	0
121	CAN	Roman Sadovsky	300	2012/2013 season (100%)	0	203	97	0	0
121	CAN	Roman Sadovsky	300	2011/2012 season (100%)	0	0	0	0	0
121	CAN	Roman Sadovsky	300	2010/2011 season (70%)	0	0	0	0	0
122	USA	Philip Warren	296	2012/2013 season (100%)	0	0	0	0	0
122	USA	Philip Warren	296	2011/2012 season (100%)	0	148	148	0	0
122	USA	Philip Warren	296	2010/2011 season (70%)	0	0	0	0	0
123	RUS	Ivan Tretiakov	292	2012/2013 season (100%)	0	0	0	0	0
123	RUS	Ivan Tretiakov	292	2011/2012 season (100%)	0	0	0	0	0
123	RUS	Ivan Tretiakov	292	2010/2011 season (70%)	0	134	0	158	0
124	USA	Grant Hochstein	291	2012/2013 season (100%)	0	0	0	0	0
124	USA	Grant Hochstein	291	2011/2012 season (100%)	0	0	0	164	0
124	USA	Grant Hochstein	291	2010/2011 season (70%)	0	0	0	127	0
125	FRA	Simon Hocquaux	287	2012/2013 season (100%)	93	97	0	0	0
125	FRA	Simon Hocquaux	287	2011/2012 season (100%)	0	97	0	0	0
125	FRA	Simon Hocquaux	287	2010/2011 season (70%)	0	0	0	0	0
126	JPN	Shu Nakamura	268	2012/2013 season (100%)	0	148	120	0	0
126	JPN	Shu Nakamura	268	2011/2012 season (100%)	0	0	0	0	0
126	JPN	Shu Nakamura	268	2010/2011 season (70%)	0	0	0	0	0
126	RUS	Adian Pitkeev	268	2012/2013 season (100%)	0	148	120	0	0
126	RUS	Adian Pitkeev	268	2011/2012 season (100%)	0	0	0	0	0
126	RUS	Adian Pitkeev	268	2010/2011 season (70%)	0	0	0	0	0
128	USA	Nathan Chen	250	2012/2013 season (100%)	0	250	0	0	0
128	USA	Nathan Chen	250	2011/2012 season (100%)	0	0	0	0	0
128	USA	Nathan Chen	250	2010/2011 season (70%)	0	0	0	0	0
129	AUS	Mark Webster	234	2012/2013 season (100%)	0	0	0	0	0
129	AUS	Mark Webster	234	2011/2012 season (100%)	113	0	0	0	0
129	AUS	Mark Webster	234	2010/2011 season (70%)	121	0	0	0	0
130	JPN	Taichi Honda	230	2012/2013 season (100%)	0	133	97	0	0
130	JPN	Taichi Honda	230	2011/2012 season (100%)	0	0	0	0	0
130	JPN	Taichi Honda	230	2010/2011 season (70%)	0	0	0	0	0
131	AUS	Brendan Kerry	228	2012/2013 season (100%)	102	0	0	0	0
131	AUS	Brendan Kerry	228	2011/2012 season (100%)	126	0	0	0	0
131	AUS	Brendan Kerry	228	2010/2011 season (70%)	98	0	0	0	0
132	ARM	Slavik Hayrapetyan	225	2012/2013 season (100%)	61	0	0	0	0
132	ARM	Slavik Hayrapetyan	225	2011/2012 season (100%)	0	0	0	164	0
132	ARM	Slavik Hayrapetyan	225	2010/2011 season (70%)	0	0	0	0	0
132	USA	Alexander Johnson	225	2012/2013 season (100%)	0	0	0	225	0
132	USA	Alexander Johnson	225	2011/2012 season (100%)	0	0	0	0	0
132	USA	Alexander Johnson	225	2010/2011 season (70%)	0	0	0	0	0
134	ESP	Victor Bustamante	216	2012/2013 season (100%)	83	133	0	0	0
134	ESP	Victor Bustamante	216	2011/2012 season (100%)	0	0	0	0	0
134	ESP	Victor Bustamante	216	2010/2011 season (70%)	0	0	0	0	0
135	TPE	Jordan Ju	211	2012/2013 season (100%)	92	0	0	0	0
135	TPE	Jordan Ju	211	2011/2012 season (100%)	102	0	0	0	0
135	TPE	Jordan Ju	211	2010/2011 season (70%)	109	0	0	0	0
136	TPE	Chih-I Tsao	206	2012/2013 season (100%)	49	108	0	0	0
136	TPE	Chih-I Tsao	206	2011/2012 season (100%)	49	0	0	0	0
136	TPE	Chih-I Tsao	206	2010/2011 season (70%)	0	0	0	0	0
137	FIN	Julian Lagus	203	2012/2013 season (100%)	0	0	0	0	0
137	FIN	Julian Lagus	203	2011/2012 season (100%)	0	0	0	203	0
137	FIN	Julian Lagus	203	2010/2011 season (70%)	0	0	0	0	0
137	FIN	Valtter Virtanen	203	2012/2013 season (100%)	0	0	0	203	0
137	FIN	Valtter Virtanen	203	2011/2012 season (100%)	0	0	0	0	0
137	FIN	Valtter Virtanen	203	2010/2011 season (70%)	0	0	0	0	0
139	SUI	Noah Scherer	201	2012/2013 season (100%)	0	0	0	0	0
139	SUI	Noah Scherer	201	2011/2012 season (100%)	0	108	0	0	0
139	SUI	Noah Scherer	201	2010/2011 season (70%)	0	93	0	0	0
140	CAN	Samuel Morais	197	2012/2013 season (100%)	0	0	0	0	0
140	CAN	Samuel Morais	197	2011/2012 season (100%)	0	0	0	0	0
140	CAN	Samuel Morais	197	2010/2011 season (70%)	0	104	93	0	0
141	UKR	Dmitri Ignatenko	186	2012/2013 season (100%)	0	0	0	0	0
141	UKR	Dmitri Ignatenko	186	2011/2012 season (100%)	102	0	0	0	0
141	UKR	Dmitri Ignatenko	186	2010/2011 season (70%)	0	84	0	0	0
142	USA	Jonathan Cassar	182	2012/2013 season (100%)	0	0	0	0	0
142	USA	Jonathan Cassar	182	2011/2012 season (100%)	0	0	0	182	0
142	USA	Jonathan Cassar	182	2010/2011 season (70%)	0	0	0	0	0
142	USA	Johnny Weir	182	2012/2013 season (100%)	0	0	0	182	0
142	USA	Johnny Weir	182	2011/2012 season (100%)	0	0	0	0	0
142	USA	Johnny Weir	182	2010/2011 season (70%)	0	0	0	0	0
144	AUS	David Kranjec	180	2012/2013 season (100%)	83	97	0	0	0
144	AUS	David Kranjec	180	2011/2012 season (100%)	0	0	0	0	0
144	AUS	David Kranjec	180	2010/2011 season (70%)	0	0	0	0	0
145	SUI	Laurent Alvarez	179	2012/2013 season (100%)	0	0	0	0	0
145	SUI	Laurent Alvarez	179	2011/2012 season (100%)	0	0	0	0	0
145	SUI	Laurent Alvarez	179	2010/2011 season (70%)	64	0	0	115	0
146	RUS	Denis Leushin	175	2012/2013 season (100%)	0	0	0	0	0
146	RUS	Denis Leushin	175	2011/2012 season (100%)	0	0	0	0	0
146	RUS	Denis Leushin	175	2010/2011 season (70%)	0	0	0	175	0
147	ISR	Maxim Shipov	173	2012/2013 season (100%)	0	0	0	0	0
147	ISR	Maxim Shipov	173	2011/2012 season (100%)	0	0	0	0	0
147	ISR	Maxim Shipov	173	2010/2011 season (70%)	58	0	0	115	0
148	TUR	Osman Akgün	164	2012/2013 season (100%)	0	0	0	164	0
148	TUR	Osman Akgün	164	2011/2012 season (100%)	0	0	0	0	0
148	TUR	Osman Akgün	164	2010/2011 season (70%)	0	0	0	0	0
148	SWE	Bertil Skeppar	164	2012/2013 season (100%)	0	0	0	164	0
148	SWE	Bertil Skeppar	164	2011/2012 season (100%)	0	0	0	0	0
148	SWE	Bertil Skeppar	164	2010/2011 season (70%)	0	0	0	0	0
148	USA	David Wang	164	2012/2013 season (100%)	0	0	0	0	0
148	USA	David Wang	164	2011/2012 season (100%)	0	164	0	0	0
148	USA	David Wang	164	2010/2011 season (70%)	0	0	0	0	0
151	RUS	Artem Grigoriev	158	2012/2013 season (100%)	0	0	0	0	0
151	RUS	Artem Grigoriev	158	2011/2012 season (100%)	0	0	0	0	0
151	RUS	Artem Grigoriev	158	2010/2011 season (70%)	0	158	0	0	0
152	KOR	Alex Kang Chan Kam	156	2012/2013 season (100%)	0	0	0	0	0
152	KOR	Alex Kang Chan Kam	156	2011/2012 season (100%)	156	0	0	0	0
152	KOR	Alex Kang Chan Kam	156	2010/2011 season (70%)	0	0	0	0	0
153	BRA	Kevin Alves	151	2012/2013 season (100%)	0	0	0	0	0
153	BRA	Kevin Alves	151	2011/2012 season (100%)	83	0	0	0	0
153	BRA	Kevin Alves	151	2010/2011 season (70%)	0	68	0	0	0
154	CAN	Samuel Angers	133	2012/2013 season (100%)	0	0	0	0	0
154	CAN	Samuel Angers	133	2011/2012 season (100%)	0	133	0	0	0
154	CAN	Samuel Angers	133	2010/2011 season (70%)	0	0	0	0	0
154	RUS	Andrei Lazukin	133	2012/2013 season (100%)	0	133	0	0	0
154	RUS	Andrei Lazukin	133	2011/2012 season (100%)	0	0	0	0	0
154	RUS	Andrei Lazukin	133	2010/2011 season (70%)	0	0	0	0	0
156	TUR	Kutay Eryoldas	127	2012/2013 season (100%)	0	0	0	0	0
156	TUR	Kutay Eryoldas	127	2011/2012 season (100%)	0	0	0	0	0
156	TUR	Kutay Eryoldas	127	2010/2011 season (70%)	0	0	0	127	0
156	GER	Viktor Kremke	127	2012/2013 season (100%)	0	0	0	0	0
156	GER	Viktor Kremke	127	2011/2012 season (100%)	0	0	0	0	0
156	GER	Viktor Kremke	127	2010/2011 season (70%)	0	0	0	127	0
156	FIN	Ari-Pekka Nurmenkari	127	2012/2013 season (100%)	0	0	0	0	0
156	FIN	Ari-Pekka Nurmenkari	127	2011/2012 season (100%)	0	0	0	0	0
156	FIN	Ari-Pekka Nurmenkari	127	2010/2011 season (70%)	0	0	0	127	0
159	ROU	Vlad Ionescu	115	2012/2013 season (100%)	0	0	0	0	0
159	ROU	Vlad Ionescu	115	2011/2012 season (100%)	0	0	0	0	0
159	ROU	Vlad Ionescu	115	2010/2011 season (70%)	0	0	0	115	0
159	JPN	Fumiya Itai	115	2012/2013 season (100%)	0	0	0	0	0
159	JPN	Fumiya Itai	115	2011/2012 season (100%)	0	0	0	0	0
159	JPN	Fumiya Itai	115	2010/2011 season (70%)	0	115	0	0	0
161	RUS	Feodosiy Efremenkov	108	2012/2013 season (100%)	0	108	0	0	0
161	RUS	Feodosiy Efremenkov	108	2011/2012 season (100%)	0	0	0	0	0
161	RUS	Feodosiy Efremenkov	108	2010/2011 season (70%)	0	0	0	0	0
161	CAN	Peter O Brien	108	2012/2013 season (100%)	0	0	0	0	0
161	CAN	Peter O Brien	108	2011/2012 season (100%)	0	108	0	0	0
161	CAN	Peter O Brien	108	2010/2011 season (70%)	0	0	0	0	0
161	GER	Niko Ulanovsky	108	2012/2013 season (100%)	0	0	0	0	0
161	GER	Niko Ulanovsky	108	2011/2012 season (100%)	0	108	0	0	0
161	GER	Niko Ulanovsky	108	2010/2011 season (70%)	0	0	0	0	0
164	CAN	Christophe Belley-Lemelin	97	2012/2013 season (100%)	0	0	0	0	0
164	CAN	Christophe Belley-Lemelin	97	2011/2012 season (100%)	0	97	0	0	0
164	CAN	Christophe Belley-Lemelin	97	2010/2011 season (70%)	0	0	0	0	0
164	GBR	Jack Newberry	97	2012/2013 season (100%)	0	97	0	0	0
164	GBR	Jack Newberry	97	2011/2012 season (100%)	0	0	0	0	0
164	GBR	Jack Newberry	97	2010/2011 season (70%)	0	0	0	0	0
164	SUI	Nicola Todeschini	97	2012/2013 season (100%)	0	97	0	0	0
164	SUI	Nicola Todeschini	97	2011/2012 season (100%)	0	0	0	0	0
164	SUI	Nicola Todeschini	97	2010/2011 season (70%)	0	0	0	0	0
167	CHN	Zuoren Xu	93	2012/2013 season (100%)	0	0	0	0	0
167	CHN	Zuoren Xu	93	2011/2012 season (100%)	0	0	0	0	0
167	CHN	Zuoren Xu	93	2010/2011 season (70%)	0	93	0	0	0
168	BUL	Manol Atanassov	92	2012/2013 season (100%)	92	0	0	0	0
168	BUL	Manol Atanassov	92	2011/2012 season (100%)	0	0	0	0	0
168	BUL	Manol Atanassov	92	2010/2011 season (70%)	0	0	0	0	0
169	TPE	Wun-Chang Shih	88	2012/2013 season (100%)	0	0	0	0	0
169	TPE	Wun-Chang Shih	88	2011/2012 season (100%)	0	0	0	0	0
169	TPE	Wun-Chang Shih	88	2010/2011 season (70%)	88	0	0	0	0
170	TPE	Stephen Li-Chung Kuo	79	2012/2013 season (100%)	0	0	0	0	0
170	TPE	Stephen Li-Chung Kuo	79	2011/2012 season (100%)	0	0	0	0	0
170	TPE	Stephen Li-Chung Kuo	79	2010/2011 season (70%)	79	0	0	0	0
171	JPN	Takuya Kondoh	76	2012/2013 season (100%)	0	0	0	0	0
171	JPN	Takuya Kondoh	76	2011/2012 season (100%)	0	0	0	0	0
171	JPN	Takuya Kondoh	76	2010/2011 season (70%)	0	76	0	0	0
171	USA	Alexander Zahradnicek	76	2012/2013 season (100%)	0	0	0	0	0
171	USA	Alexander Zahradnicek	76	2011/2012 season (100%)	0	0	0	0	0
171	USA	Alexander Zahradnicek	76	2010/2011 season (70%)	0	76	0	0	0
173	AUS	Nicholas Fernandez	74	2012/2013 season (100%)	0	0	0	0	0
173	AUS	Nicholas Fernandez	74	2011/2012 season (100%)	74	0	0	0	0
173	AUS	Nicholas Fernandez	74	2010/2011 season (70%)	0	0	0	0	0
174	SWE	Marcus Björk	44	2012/2013 season (100%)	0	0	0	0	0
174	SWE	Marcus Björk	44	2011/2012 season (100%)	44	0	0	0	0
174	SWE	Marcus Björk	44	2010/2011 season (70%)	0	0	0	0	0
175	FIN	Bela Papp	39	2012/2013 season (100%)	0	0	0	0	0
175	FIN	Bela Papp	39	2011/2012 season (100%)	0	0	0	0	0
175	FIN	Bela Papp	39	2010/2011 season (70%)	39	0	0	0	0
176	BLR	Vitali Luchanok	34	2012/2013 season (100%)	0	0	0	0	0
176	BLR	Vitali Luchanok	34	2011/2012 season (100%)	0	0	0	0	0
176	BLR	Vitali Luchanok	34	2010/2011 season (70%)	34	0	0	0	0
177	POL	Kamil Bialas	31	2012/2013 season (100%)	0	0	0	0	0
177	POL	Kamil Bialas	31	2011/2012 season (100%)	0	0	0	0	0
177	POL	Kamil Bialas	31	2010/2011 season (70%)	31	0	0	0	0

==== Ladies' singles (216 skaters) ====
As of 20 April 2013

Rank	Nation	Skater	Points	Season	ISU Championships or Olympics	(Junior) Grand Prix and Final		Selected International Competition	
Rank	Nation	Skater	Points	Season	Best	Best	2nd Best	Best	2nd Best
1	ITA	Carolina Kostner	5189	2012/2013 season (100%)	1080	0	0	250	250
1	ITA	Carolina Kostner	5189	2011/2012 season (100%)	1200	800	400	250	0
1	ITA	Carolina Kostner	5189	2010/2011 season (70%)	680	504	280	175	0
2	JPN	Akiko Suzuki	4254	2012/2013 season (100%)	756	648	360	0	0
2	JPN	Akiko Suzuki	4254	2011/2012 season (100%)	972	720	400	0	0
2	JPN	Akiko Suzuki	4254	2010/2011 season (70%)	312	408	252	175	175
3	JPN	Mao Asada	3688	2012/2013 season (100%)	972	800	400	0	0
3	JPN	Mao Asada	3688	2011/2012 season (100%)	756	400	360	0	0
3	JPN	Mao Asada	3688	2010/2011 season (70%)	529	183	134	0	0
4	RUS	Alena Leonova	3481	2012/2013 season (100%)	339	236	213	0	0
4	RUS	Alena Leonova	3481	2011/2012 season (100%)	1080	648	360	0	0
4	RUS	Alena Leonova	3481	2010/2011 season (70%)	613	227	0	175	142
5	USA	Ashley Wagner	3398	2012/2013 season (100%)	787	720	400	0	0
5	USA	Ashley Wagner	3398	2011/2012 season (100%)	875	324	292	0	0
5	USA	Ashley Wagner	3398	2010/2011 season (70%)	0	227	183	0	0
6	FIN	Kiira Korpi	3315	2012/2013 season (100%)	0	583	400	225	0
6	FIN	Kiira Korpi	3315	2011/2012 season (100%)	756	262	236	0	0
6	FIN	Kiira Korpi	3315	2010/2011 season (70%)	476	280	204	175	158
7	JPN	Kanako Murakami	3024	2012/2013 season (100%)	875	324	292	0	0
7	JPN	Kanako Murakami	3024	2011/2012 season (100%)	787	292	236	0	0
7	JPN	Kanako Murakami	3024	2010/2011 season (70%)	402	454	280	0	0
8	SWE	Viktoria Helgesson	2955	2012/2013 season (100%)	551	191	191	250	203
8	SWE	Viktoria Helgesson	2955	2011/2012 season (100%)	551	324	262	250	182
8	SWE	Viktoria Helgesson	2955	2010/2011 season (70%)	347	165	0	175	175
9	RUS	Adelina Sotnikova	2870	2012/2013 season (100%)	756	324	262	225	0
9	RUS	Adelina Sotnikova	2870	2011/2012 season (100%)	405	324	324	250	0
9	RUS	Adelina Sotnikova	2870	2010/2011 season (70%)	350	245	175	0	0
10	RUS	Elizaveta Tuktamysheva	2863	2012/2013 season (100%)	680	525	360	0	0
10	RUS	Elizaveta Tuktamysheva	2863	2011/2012 season (100%)	0	583	400	0	0
10	RUS	Elizaveta Tuktamysheva	2863	2010/2011 season (70%)	315	221	175	0	0
11	ITA	Valentina Marchei	2678	2012/2013 season (100%)	612	292	0	250	250
11	ITA	Valentina Marchei	2678	2011/2012 season (100%)	574	0	0	225	0
11	ITA	Valentina Marchei	2678	2010/2011 season (70%)	228	183	134	158	158
12	USA	Alissa Czisny	2650	2012/2013 season (100%)	0	0	0	0	0
12	USA	Alissa Czisny	2650	2011/2012 season (100%)	131	525	400	203	0
12	USA	Alissa Czisny	2650	2010/2011 season (70%)	551	560	280	0	0
13	CHN	Zijun Li	2500	2012/2013 season (100%)	638	292	262	250	0
13	CHN	Zijun Li	2500	2011/2012 season (100%)	328	255	225	250	0
13	CHN	Zijun Li	2500	2010/2011 season (70%)	151	199	142	0	0
14	RUS	Yulia Lipnitskaya	2484	2012/2013 season (100%)	450	360	324	250	0
14	RUS	Yulia Lipnitskaya	2484	2011/2012 season (100%)	500	350	250	0	0
14	RUS	Yulia Lipnitskaya	2484	2010/2011 season (70%)	0	0	0	0	0
15	FRA	Maé-Bérénice Méité	2478	2012/2013 season (100%)	418	262	236	225	182
15	FRA	Maé-Bérénice Méité	2478	2011/2012 season (100%)	237	236	213	250	203
15	FRA	Maé-Bérénice Méité	2478	2010/2011 season (70%)	253	134	0	142	0
16	RUS	Ksenia Makarova	2279	2012/2013 season (100%)	0	236	213	225	0
16	RUS	Ksenia Makarova	2279	2011/2012 season (100%)	517	262	213	0	0
16	RUS	Ksenia Makarova	2279	2010/2011 season (70%)	447	252	149	127	0
17	SWE	Joshi Helgesson	2221	2012/2013 season (100%)	402	213	0	250	250
17	SWE	Joshi Helgesson	2221	2011/2012 season (100%)	325	0	0	225	203
17	SWE	Joshi Helgesson	2221	2010/2011 season (70%)	193	204	149	158	127
18	USA	Gracie Gold	2207	2012/2013 season (100%)	709	360	213	225	0
18	USA	Gracie Gold	2207	2011/2012 season (100%)	450	250	0	0	0
18	USA	Gracie Gold	2207	2010/2011 season (70%)	0	0	0	0	0
19	KOR	Yuna Kim	2206	2012/2013 season (100%)	1200	0	0	250	0
19	KOR	Yuna Kim	2206	2011/2012 season (100%)	0	0	0	0	0
19	KOR	Yuna Kim	2206	2010/2011 season (70%)	756	0	0	0	0
20	GEO	Elene Gedevanishvili	2204	2012/2013 season (100%)	214	262	236	0	0
20	GEO	Elene Gedevanishvili	2204	2011/2012 season (100%)	680	262	213	225	0
20	GEO	Elene Gedevanishvili	2204	2010/2011 season (70%)	326	165	149	0	0
21	USA	Mirai Nagasu	2167	2012/2013 season (100%)	0	324	292	203	0
21	USA	Mirai Nagasu	2167	2011/2012 season (100%)	0	360	262	250	0
21	USA	Mirai Nagasu	2167	2010/2011 season (70%)	476	252	204	0	0
22	USA	Agnes Zawadzki	2151	2012/2013 season (100%)	402	324	262	250	0
22	USA	Agnes Zawadzki	2151	2011/2012 season (100%)	496	213	191	0	0
22	USA	Agnes Zawadzki	2151	2010/2011 season (70%)	284	204	165	0	0
23	USA	Christina Gao	2130	2012/2013 season (100%)	612	472	360	0	0
23	USA	Christina Gao	2130	2011/2012 season (100%)	266	262	0	0	0
23	USA	Christina Gao	2130	2010/2011 season (70%)	256	158	158	0	0
24	JPN	Haruka Imai	2088	2012/2013 season (100%)	0	262	191	225	203
24	JPN	Haruka Imai	2088	2011/2012 season (100%)	362	292	236	0	0
24	JPN	Haruka Imai	2088	2010/2011 season (70%)	0	183	165	175	142
25	CAN	Amelie Lacoste	1901	2012/2013 season (100%)	362	236	191	203	0
25	CAN	Amelie Lacoste	1901	2011/2012 season (100%)	446	236	191	0	0
25	CAN	Amelie Lacoste	1901	2010/2011 season (70%)	253	227	183	0	0
26	ESP	Sonia Lafuente	1836	2012/2013 season (100%)	446	0	0	250	164
26	ESP	Sonia Lafuente	1836	2011/2012 season (100%)	275	213	0	164	0
26	ESP	Sonia Lafuente	1836	2010/2011 season (70%)	185	149	0	175	0
27	RUS	Polina Korobeynikova	1820	2012/2013 season (100%)	0	236	213	250	0
27	RUS	Polina Korobeynikova	1820	2011/2012 season (100%)	612	284	225	0	0
27	RUS	Polina Korobeynikova	1820	2010/2011 season (70%)	0	0	0	0	0
28	RUS	Polina Shelepen	1710	2012/2013 season (100%)	0	0	0	164	164
28	RUS	Polina Shelepen	1710	2011/2012 season (100%)	295	315	250	0	0
28	RUS	Polina Shelepen	1710	2010/2011 season (70%)	186	175	161	0	0
29	EST	Elena Glebova	1663	2012/2013 season (100%)	247	213	0	182	182
29	EST	Elena Glebova	1663	2011/2012 season (100%)	339	0	0	250	250
29	EST	Elena Glebova	1663	2010/2011 season (70%)	92	0	0	0	0
30	UKR	Natalia Popova	1626	2012/2013 season (100%)	275	97	0	225	182
30	UKR	Natalia Popova	1626	2011/2012 season (100%)	264	133	0	225	225
30	UKR	Natalia Popova	1626	2010/2011 season (70%)	0	0	0	158	115
31	GER	Sarah Hecken	1578	2012/2013 season (100%)	0	0	0	250	250
31	GER	Sarah Hecken	1578	2011/2012 season (100%)	162	191	0	250	182
31	GER	Sarah Hecken	1578	2010/2011 season (70%)	293	0	0	158	142
32	CAN	Kaetlyn Osmond	1562	2012/2013 season (100%)	574	400	0	250	0
32	CAN	Kaetlyn Osmond	1562	2011/2012 season (100%)	194	0	0	0	0
32	CAN	Kaetlyn Osmond	1562	2010/2011 season (70%)	0	76	68	0	0
33	SVK	Monika Simancikova	1506	2012/2013 season (100%)	222	133	0	225	203
33	SVK	Monika Simancikova	1506	2011/2012 season (100%)	214	108	97	182	0
33	SVK	Monika Simancikova	1506	2010/2011 season (70%)	58	115	104	0	0
34	GBR	Jenna McCorkell	1504	2012/2013 season (100%)	162	191	0	250	250
34	GBR	Jenna McCorkell	1504	2011/2012 season (100%)	305	0	0	182	164
34	GBR	Jenna McCorkell	1504	2010/2011 season (70%)	150	0	0	115	0
35	JPN	Satoko Miyahara	1500	2012/2013 season (100%)	266	250	230	0	0
35	JPN	Satoko Miyahara	1500	2011/2012 season (100%)	365	225	164	0	0
35	JPN	Satoko Miyahara	1500	2010/2011 season (70%)	0	0	0	0	0
36	JPN	Miki Ando	1488	2012/2013 season (100%)	0	0	0	0	0
36	JPN	Miki Ando	1488	2011/2012 season (100%)	0	0	0	0	0
36	JPN	Miki Ando	1488	2010/2011 season (70%)	840	368	280	0	0
37	EST	Gerli Liinamäe	1417	2012/2013 season (100%)	0	148	108	164	0
37	EST	Gerli Liinamäe	1417	2011/2012 season (100%)	127	182	182	225	0
37	EST	Gerli Liinamäe	1417	2010/2011 season (70%)	166	76	68	115	0
38	CHN	Kexin Zhang	1397	2012/2013 season (100%)	325	0	0	0	0
38	CHN	Kexin Zhang	1397	2011/2012 season (100%)	638	292	0	0	0
38	CHN	Kexin Zhang	1397	2010/2011 season (70%)	0	142	0	0	0
39	GER	Nathalie Weinzierl	1384	2012/2013 season (100%)	362	108	97	250	225
39	GER	Nathalie Weinzierl	1384	2011/2012 season (100%)	92	0	0	250	0
39	GER	Nathalie Weinzierl	1384	2010/2011 season (70%)	0	0	0	0	0
40	CAN	Cynthia Phaneuf	1370	2012/2013 season (100%)	0	0	0	0	0
40	CAN	Cynthia Phaneuf	1370	2011/2012 season (100%)	402	213	0	0	0
40	CAN	Cynthia Phaneuf	1370	2010/2011 season (70%)	347	204	204	0	0
41	SWE	Isabelle Olsson	1359	2012/2013 season (100%)	0	0	0	250	225
41	SWE	Isabelle Olsson	1359	2011/2012 season (100%)	0	120	108	203	203
41	SWE	Isabelle Olsson	1359	2010/2011 season (70%)	31	115	104	0	0
42	USA	Caroline Zhang	1315	2012/2013 season (100%)	0	0	0	0	0
42	USA	Caroline Zhang	1315	2011/2012 season (100%)	680	236	0	250	0
42	USA	Caroline Zhang	1315	2010/2011 season (70%)	0	149	0	0	0
43	JPN	Risa Shoji	1304	2012/2013 season (100%)	0	0	0	203	0
43	JPN	Risa Shoji	1304	2011/2012 season (100%)	68	225	225	0	0
43	JPN	Risa Shoji	1304	2010/2011 season (70%)	230	178	175	0	0
44	RUS	Kristina Zaseeva	1283	2012/2013 season (100%)	0	182	133	225	203
44	RUS	Kristina Zaseeva	1283	2011/2012 season (100%)	0	133	0	225	182
44	RUS	Kristina Zaseeva	1283	2010/2011 season (70%)	0	0	0	0	0
45	AUT	Kerstin Frank	1213	2012/2013 season (100%)	264	0	0	250	225
45	AUT	Kerstin Frank	1213	2011/2012 season (100%)	146	0	0	164	164
45	AUT	Kerstin Frank	1213	2010/2011 season (70%)	0	0	0	142	127
46	USA	Courtney Hicks	1192	2012/2013 season (100%)	328	225	182	0	0
46	USA	Courtney Hicks	1192	2011/2012 season (100%)	0	250	0	0	0
46	USA	Courtney Hicks	1192	2010/2011 season (70%)	207	0	0	0	0
47	FRA	Lenaelle Gilleron-Gorry	1189	2012/2013 season (100%)	293	120	108	0	0
47	FRA	Lenaelle Gilleron-Gorry	1189	2011/2012 season (100%)	0	120	120	225	203
47	FRA	Lenaelle Gilleron-Gorry	1189	2010/2011 season (70%)	0	93	0	0	0
48	JPN	Yuki Nishino	1141	2012/2013 season (100%)	0	0	0	0	0
48	JPN	Yuki Nishino	1141	2011/2012 season (100%)	0	182	164	225	225
48	JPN	Yuki Nishino	1141	2010/2011 season (70%)	110	142	93	0	0
49	USA	Samantha Cesario	1101	2012/2013 season (100%)	365	203	0	0	0
49	USA	Samantha Cesario	1101	2011/2012 season (100%)	0	203	203	0	0
49	USA	Samantha Cesario	1101	2010/2011 season (70%)	0	127	0	0	0
50	RUS	Elena Radionova	1100	2012/2013 season (100%)	500	350	250	0	0
50	RUS	Elena Radionova	1100	2011/2012 season (100%)	0	0	0	0	0
50	RUS	Elena Radionova	1100	2010/2011 season (70%)	0	0	0	0	0
51	KOR	Hae Jin Kim	1095	2012/2013 season (100%)	75	250	164	0	0
51	KOR	Hae Jin Kim	1095	2011/2012 season (100%)	239	203	164	0	0
51	KOR	Hae Jin Kim	1095	2010/2011 season (70%)	0	0	0	0	0
52	RUS	Polina Agafonova	1079	2012/2013 season (100%)	0	0	0	203	0
52	RUS	Polina Agafonova	1079	2011/2012 season (100%)	0	203	203	250	0
52	RUS	Polina Agafonova	1079	2010/2011 season (70%)	0	127	93	0	0
53	FRA	Yretha Silete	1063	2012/2013 season (100%)	0	0	0	0	0
53	FRA	Yretha Silete	1063	2011/2012 season (100%)	377	191	0	0	0
53	FRA	Yretha Silete	1063	2010/2011 season (70%)	122	127	104	142	0
54	CHN	Bingwa Geng	1015	2012/2013 season (100%)	0	0	0	0	0
54	CHN	Bingwa Geng	1015	2011/2012 season (100%)	293	191	0	182	0
54	CHN	Bingwa Geng	1015	2010/2011 season (70%)	166	183	0	0	0
55	USA	Rachael Flatt	1010	2012/2013 season (100%)	0	0	0	0	0
55	USA	Rachael Flatt	1010	2011/2012 season (100%)	0	0	0	0	0
55	USA	Rachael Flatt	1010	2010/2011 season (70%)	428	330	252	0	0
56	SLO	Patricia Glešcic	983	2012/2013 season (100%)	0	0	0	182	0
56	SLO	Patricia Glešcic	983	2011/2012 season (100%)	93	0	0	250	164
56	SLO	Patricia Glešcic	983	2010/2011 season (70%)	48	104	0	142	142
57	USA	Vanessa Lam	978	2012/2013 season (100%)	0	182	0	0	0
57	USA	Vanessa Lam	978	2011/2012 season (100%)	141	250	230	0	0
57	USA	Vanessa Lam	978	2010/2011 season (70%)	0	175	0	0	0
58	CHN	Ziquan Zhao	940	2012/2013 season (100%)	114	182	97	225	0
58	CHN	Ziquan Zhao	940	2011/2012 season (100%)	174	148	0	0	0
58	CHN	Ziquan Zhao	940	2010/2011 season (70%)	0	0	0	0	0
59	RUS	Anna Pogorilaya	939	2012/2013 season (100%)	405	284	250	0	0
59	RUS	Anna Pogorilaya	939	2011/2012 season (100%)	0	0	0	0	0
59	RUS	Anna Pogorilaya	939	2010/2011 season (70%)	0	0	0	0	0
60	JPN	Miyabi Oba	932	2012/2013 season (100%)	0	225	182	225	0
60	JPN	Miyabi Oba	932	2011/2012 season (100%)	0	133	0	0	0
60	JPN	Miyabi Oba	932	2010/2011 season (70%)	167	0	0	0	0
61	ITA	Roberta Rodeghiero	928	2012/2013 season (100%)	0	0	0	250	203
61	ITA	Roberta Rodeghiero	928	2011/2012 season (100%)	0	0	0	250	225
61	ITA	Roberta Rodeghiero	928	2010/2011 season (70%)	0	0	0	142	0
62	SLO	Dasa Grm	921	2012/2013 season (100%)	0	0	0	225	203
62	SLO	Dasa Grm	921	2011/2012 season (100%)	0	0	0	250	164
62	SLO	Dasa Grm	921	2010/2011 season (70%)	79	0	0	127	0
63	ITA	Francesca Rio	918	2012/2013 season (100%)	0	0	0	225	182
63	ITA	Francesca Rio	918	2011/2012 season (100%)	83	0	0	225	203
63	ITA	Francesca Rio	918	2010/2011 season (70%)	0	0	0	0	0
64	KOR	So Youn Park	860	2012/2013 season (100%)	157	225	148	0	0
64	KOR	So Youn Park	860	2011/2012 season (100%)	0	182	148	0	0
64	KOR	So Youn Park	860	2010/2011 season (70%)	0	0	0	0	0
65	RUS	Nikol Gosviani	839	2012/2013 season (100%)	496	0	0	250	0
65	RUS	Nikol Gosviani	839	2011/2012 season (100%)	0	0	0	0	0
65	RUS	Nikol Gosviani	839	2010/2011 season (70%)	0	93	0	0	0
66	JPN	Miu Sato	833	2012/2013 season (100%)	0	164	148	0	0
66	JPN	Miu Sato	833	2011/2012 season (100%)	157	182	182	0	0
66	JPN	Miu Sato	833	2010/2011 season (70%)	0	0	0	0	0
67	AUS	Brooklee Han	818	2012/2013 season (100%)	264	120	0	203	0
67	AUS	Brooklee Han	818	2011/2012 season (100%)	0	120	0	0	0
67	AUS	Brooklee Han	818	2010/2011 season (70%)	43	68	0	0	0
68	FIN	Juulia Turkkila	816	2012/2013 season (100%)	156	0	0	0	0
68	FIN	Juulia Turkkila	816	2011/2012 season (100%)	200	0	0	250	0
68	FIN	Juulia Turkkila	816	2010/2011 season (70%)	134	68	0	142	0
69	USA	Hannah Miller	743	2012/2013 season (100%)	0	315	225	0	0
69	USA	Hannah Miller	743	2011/2012 season (100%)	0	203	0	0	0
69	USA	Hannah Miller	743	2010/2011 season (70%)	0	0	0	0	0
70	ITA	Carol Bressanutti	741	2012/2013 season (100%)	0	0	0	225	203
70	ITA	Carol Bressanutti	741	2011/2012 season (100%)	83	0	0	0	0
70	ITA	Carol Bressanutti	741	2010/2011 season (70%)	0	0	0	115	115
71	FRA	Lena Marrocco	735	2012/2013 season (100%)	0	0	0	164	0
71	FRA	Lena Marrocco	735	2011/2012 season (100%)	0	0	0	203	182
71	FRA	Lena Marrocco	735	2010/2011 season (70%)	0	0	0	175	175
72	LUX	Fleur Maxwell	727	2012/2013 season (100%)	74	0	0	182	182
72	LUX	Fleur Maxwell	727	2011/2012 season (100%)	0	0	0	225	0
72	LUX	Fleur Maxwell	727	2010/2011 season (70%)	64	0	0	0	0
73	DEN	Anita Madsen	721	2012/2013 season (100%)	173	0	0	225	203
73	DEN	Anita Madsen	721	2011/2012 season (100%)	0	120	0	0	0
73	DEN	Anita Madsen	721	2010/2011 season (70%)	0	0	0	0	0
74	FIN	Beata Papp	709	2012/2013 season (100%)	0	0	0	0	0
74	FIN	Beata Papp	709	2011/2012 season (100%)	0	133	97	182	182
74	FIN	Beata Papp	709	2010/2011 season (70%)	0	0	0	115	0
75	BEL	Ira Vannut	708	2012/2013 season (100%)	0	0	0	0	0
75	BEL	Ira Vannut	708	2011/2012 season (100%)	0	0	0	0	0
75	BEL	Ira Vannut	708	2010/2011 season (70%)	312	142	127	127	0
76	RUS	Sofia Biryukova	707	2012/2013 season (100%)	0	0	0	0	0
76	RUS	Sofia Biryukova	707	2011/2012 season (100%)	0	292	0	250	0
76	RUS	Sofia Biryukova	707	2010/2011 season (70%)	0	165	0	0	0
77	NOR	Anne Line Gjersem	673	2012/2013 season (100%)	92	97	0	182	0
77	NOR	Anne Line Gjersem	673	2011/2012 season (100%)	0	0	0	0	0
77	NOR	Anne Line Gjersem	673	2010/2011 season (70%)	0	0	0	175	127
78	BEL	Kaat Van Daele	668	2012/2013 season (100%)	140	0	0	164	0
78	BEL	Kaat Van Daele	668	2011/2012 season (100%)	0	0	0	182	182
78	BEL	Kaat Van Daele	668	2010/2011 season (70%)	0	0	0	0	0
79	USA	Yasmin Siraj	654	2012/2013 season (100%)	174	0	0	0	0
79	USA	Yasmin Siraj	654	2011/2012 season (100%)	0	164	0	0	0
79	USA	Yasmin Siraj	654	2010/2011 season (70%)	0	158	158	0	0
80	USA	Angela Wang	632	2012/2013 season (100%)	0	255	250	0	0
80	USA	Angela Wang	632	2011/2012 season (100%)	0	0	0	0	0
80	USA	Angela Wang	632	2010/2011 season (70%)	0	127	0	0	0
81	JPN	Shion Kokubun	621	2012/2013 season (100%)	0	0	0	0	0
81	JPN	Shion Kokubun	621	2011/2012 season (100%)	0	0	0	182	182
81	JPN	Shion Kokubun	621	2010/2011 season (70%)	0	142	115	0	0
82	CAN	Gabrielle Daleman	607	2012/2013 season (100%)	295	164	148	0	0
82	CAN	Gabrielle Daleman	607	2011/2012 season (100%)	0	0	0	0	0
82	CAN	Gabrielle Daleman	607	2010/2011 season (70%)	0	0	0	0	0
83	KOR	Min-Jeong Kwak	606	2012/2013 season (100%)	0	0	0	0	0
83	KOR	Min-Jeong Kwak	606	2011/2012 season (100%)	325	0	0	0	0
83	KOR	Min-Jeong Kwak	606	2010/2011 season (70%)	281	0	0	0	0
84	JPN	Rika Hongo	604	2012/2013 season (100%)	215	225	164	0	0
84	JPN	Rika Hongo	604	2011/2012 season (100%)	0	0	0	0	0
84	JPN	Rika Hongo	604	2010/2011 season (70%)	0	0	0	0	0
85	JPN	Kako Tomotaki	602	2012/2013 season (100%)	0	108	0	0	0
85	JPN	Kako Tomotaki	602	2011/2012 season (100%)	0	133	0	203	0
85	JPN	Kako Tomotaki	602	2010/2011 season (70%)	0	0	0	158	0
86	FRA	Laurine Lecavelier	596	2012/2013 season (100%)	141	108	0	250	0
86	FRA	Laurine Lecavelier	596	2011/2012 season (100%)	0	97	0	0	0
86	FRA	Laurine Lecavelier	596	2010/2011 season (70%)	0	0	0	0	0
87	MEX	Reyna Hamui	583	2012/2013 season (100%)	237	0	0	182	0
87	MEX	Reyna Hamui	583	2011/2012 season (100%)	0	0	0	164	0
87	MEX	Reyna Hamui	583	2010/2011 season (70%)	0	0	0	0	0
88	CAN	Julianne Séguin	523	2012/2013 season (100%)	293	133	97	0	0
88	CAN	Julianne Séguin	523	2011/2012 season (100%)	0	0	0	0	0
88	CAN	Julianne Séguin	523	2010/2011 season (70%)	0	0	0	0	0
89	CAN	Alaine Chartrand	520	2012/2013 season (100%)	239	148	133	0	0
89	CAN	Alaine Chartrand	520	2011/2012 season (100%)	0	0	0	0	0
89	CAN	Alaine Chartrand	520	2010/2011 season (70%)	0	0	0	0	0
89	TUR	Sıla Saygı	520	2012/2013 season (100%)	83	97	0	182	0
89	TUR	Sıla Saygı	520	2011/2012 season (100%)	0	0	0	0	0
89	TUR	Sıla Saygı	520	2010/2011 season (70%)	0	0	0	158	0
91	SWE	Linnea Mellgren	503	2012/2013 season (100%)	0	0	0	0	0
91	SWE	Linnea Mellgren	503	2011/2012 season (100%)	0	0	0	203	0
91	SWE	Linnea Mellgren	503	2010/2011 season (70%)	0	0	0	158	142
92	AUT	Sabrina Schulz	500	2012/2013 season (100%)	49	0	0	182	0
92	AUT	Sabrina Schulz	500	2011/2012 season (100%)	44	0	0	225	0
92	AUT	Sabrina Schulz	500	2010/2011 season (70%)	0	0	0	0	0
93	SUI	Tina Stuerzinger	499	2012/2013 season (100%)	113	0	0	164	0
93	SUI	Tina Stuerzinger	499	2011/2012 season (100%)	49	97	0	0	0
93	SUI	Tina Stuerzinger	499	2010/2011 season (70%)	0	76	0	0	0
94	RUS	Anna Shershak	491	2012/2013 season (100%)	0	133	0	0	0
94	RUS	Anna Shershak	491	2011/2012 season (100%)	0	225	133	0	0
94	RUS	Anna Shershak	491	2010/2011 season (70%)	0	0	0	0	0
95	PUR	Victoria Muniz	488	2012/2013 season (100%)	0	0	0	0	0
95	PUR	Victoria Muniz	488	2011/2012 season (100%)	264	0	0	0	0
95	PUR	Victoria Muniz	488	2010/2011 season (70%)	109	0	0	115	0
95	CAN	Myriane Samson	488	2012/2013 season (100%)	0	0	0	0	0
95	CAN	Myriane Samson	488	2011/2012 season (100%)	0	0	0	0	0
95	CAN	Myriane Samson	488	2010/2011 season (70%)	205	149	134	0	0
97	RUS	Maria Stavitskaia	484	2012/2013 season (100%)	0	203	133	0	0
97	RUS	Maria Stavitskaia	484	2011/2012 season (100%)	0	148	0	0	0
97	RUS	Maria Stavitskaia	484	2010/2011 season (70%)	0	0	0	0	0
98	USA	Ashley Cain	476	2012/2013 season (100%)	0	164	0	0	0
98	USA	Ashley Cain	476	2011/2012 season (100%)	0	164	148	0	0
98	USA	Ashley Cain	476	2010/2011 season (70%)	0	0	0	0	0
99	BRA	Isadora Williams	470	2012/2013 season (100%)	0	0	0	203	164
99	BRA	Isadora Williams	470	2011/2012 season (100%)	103	0	0	0	0
99	BRA	Isadora Williams	470	2010/2011 season (70%)	0	0	0	0	0
100	USA	Leah Keiser	457	2012/2013 season (100%)	0	250	207	0	0
100	USA	Leah Keiser	457	2011/2012 season (100%)	0	0	0	0	0
100	USA	Leah Keiser	457	2010/2011 season (70%)	0	0	0	0	0
101	BEL	Isabelle Pieman	456	2012/2013 season (100%)	0	0	0	0	0
101	BEL	Isabelle Pieman	456	2011/2012 season (100%)	126	0	0	203	0
101	BEL	Isabelle Pieman	456	2010/2011 season (70%)	0	0	0	127	0
102	RSA	Lejeanne Marais	438	2012/2013 season (100%)	140	0	0	164	0
102	RSA	Lejeanne Marais	438	2011/2012 season (100%)	92	0	0	0	0
102	RSA	Lejeanne Marais	438	2010/2011 season (70%)	134	0	0	0	0
103	USA	Kiri Baga	437	2012/2013 season (100%)	0	164	0	0	0
103	USA	Kiri Baga	437	2011/2012 season (100%)	0	0	0	0	0
103	USA	Kiri Baga	437	2010/2011 season (70%)	0	158	115	0	0
104	SLO	Nika Ceric	428	2012/2013 season (100%)	0	0	0	225	0
104	SLO	Nika Ceric	428	2011/2012 season (100%)	0	0	0	203	0
104	SLO	Nika Ceric	428	2010/2011 season (70%)	0	0	0	0	0
104	SVK	Nicole Rajicová	428	2012/2013 season (100%)	0	0	0	225	203
104	SVK	Nicole Rajicová	428	2011/2012 season (100%)	0	0	0	0	0
104	SVK	Nicole Rajicová	428	2010/2011 season (70%)	0	0	0	0	0
104	FRA	Anais Ventard	428	2012/2013 season (100%)	0	0	0	0	0
104	FRA	Anais Ventard	428	2011/2012 season (100%)	0	120	120	0	0
104	FRA	Anais Ventard	428	2010/2011 season (70%)	0	104	84	0	0
107	CZE	Eliška Brezinová	406	2012/2013 season (100%)	0	0	0	203	203
107	CZE	Eliška Brezinová	406	2011/2012 season (100%)	0	0	0	0	0
107	CZE	Eliška Brezinová	406	2010/2011 season (70%)	0	0	0	0	0
108	JPN	Shoko Ishikawa	400	2012/2013 season (100%)	0	0	0	0	0
108	JPN	Shoko Ishikawa	400	2011/2012 season (100%)	0	0	0	225	0
108	JPN	Shoko Ishikawa	400	2010/2011 season (70%)	0	0	0	175	0
109	CAN	Alexandra Najarro	398	2012/2013 season (100%)	0	0	0	0	0
109	CAN	Alexandra Najarro	398	2011/2012 season (100%)	237	0	0	0	0
109	CAN	Alexandra Najarro	398	2010/2011 season (70%)	0	93	68	0	0
110	NOR	Anine Rabe	389	2012/2013 season (100%)	0	0	0	225	0
110	NOR	Anine Rabe	389	2011/2012 season (100%)	0	0	0	164	0
110	NOR	Anine Rabe	389	2010/2011 season (70%)	0	0	0	0	0
111	RUS	Maria Artemieva	385	2012/2013 season (100%)	0	0	0	0	0
111	RUS	Maria Artemieva	385	2011/2012 season (100%)	0	0	0	203	182
111	RUS	Maria Artemieva	385	2010/2011 season (70%)	0	0	0	0	0
111	RUS	Evgenia Gerasimova	385	2012/2013 season (100%)	0	203	182	0	0
111	RUS	Evgenia Gerasimova	385	2011/2012 season (100%)	0	0	0	0	0
111	RUS	Evgenia Gerasimova	385	2010/2011 season (70%)	0	0	0	0	0
111	GER	Sandy Hoffmann	385	2012/2013 season (100%)	0	0	0	203	182
111	GER	Sandy Hoffmann	385	2011/2012 season (100%)	0	0	0	0	0
111	GER	Sandy Hoffmann	385	2010/2011 season (70%)	0	0	0	0	0
111	ITA	Giada Russo	385	2012/2013 season (100%)	0	0	0	203	182
111	ITA	Giada Russo	385	2011/2012 season (100%)	0	0	0	0	0
111	ITA	Giada Russo	385	2010/2011 season (70%)	0	0	0	0	0
115	SWE	Josefine Taljegard	382	2012/2013 season (100%)	44	133	97	0	0
115	SWE	Josefine Taljegard	382	2011/2012 season (100%)	0	108	0	0	0
115	SWE	Josefine Taljegard	382	2010/2011 season (70%)	0	0	0	0	0
116	SVK	Alexandra Kunova	380	2012/2013 season (100%)	0	0	0	164	164
116	SVK	Alexandra Kunova	380	2011/2012 season (100%)	0	0	0	0	0
116	SVK	Alexandra Kunova	380	2010/2011 season (70%)	52	0	0	0	0
117	JPN	Haruna Suzuki	373	2012/2013 season (100%)	0	0	0	0	0
117	JPN	Haruna Suzuki	373	2011/2012 season (100%)	0	148	0	225	0
117	JPN	Haruna Suzuki	373	2010/2011 season (70%)	0	0	0	0	0
118	AUS	Chantelle Kerry	370	2012/2013 season (100%)	214	0	0	0	0
118	AUS	Chantelle Kerry	370	2011/2012 season (100%)	156	0	0	0	0
118	AUS	Chantelle Kerry	370	2010/2011 season (70%)	0	0	0	0	0
119	RUS	Uliana Titushkina	367	2012/2013 season (100%)	0	203	164	0	0
119	RUS	Uliana Titushkina	367	2011/2012 season (100%)	0	0	0	0	0
119	RUS	Uliana Titushkina	367	2010/2011 season (70%)	0	0	0	0	0
120	JPN	Kana Muramoto	361	2012/2013 season (100%)	0	0	0	0	0
120	JPN	Kana Muramoto	361	2011/2012 season (100%)	0	0	0	203	0
120	JPN	Kana Muramoto	361	2010/2011 season (70%)	0	0	0	158	0
121	JPN	Yukiko Fujisawa	347	2012/2013 season (100%)	0	0	0	0	0
121	JPN	Yukiko Fujisawa	347	2011/2012 season (100%)	0	148	0	0	0
121	JPN	Yukiko Fujisawa	347	2010/2011 season (70%)	0	115	84	0	0
122	TPE	Melinda Wang	340	2012/2013 season (100%)	126	0	0	0	0
122	TPE	Melinda Wang	340	2011/2012 season (100%)	214	0	0	0	0
122	TPE	Melinda Wang	340	2010/2011 season (70%)	98	0	0	0	0
123	CHN	Qiuying Zhu	323	2012/2013 season (100%)	0	0	0	0	0
123	CHN	Qiuying Zhu	323	2011/2012 season (100%)	173	0	0	0	0
123	CHN	Qiuying Zhu	323	2010/2011 season (70%)	150	0	0	0	0
124	AUT	Belinda Schönberger	322	2012/2013 season (100%)	0	0	0	164	0
124	AUT	Belinda Schönberger	322	2011/2012 season (100%)	0	0	0	0	0
124	AUT	Belinda Schönberger	322	2010/2011 season (70%)	0	0	0	158	0
125	ITA	Alice Garlisi	319	2012/2013 season (100%)	0	0	0	0	0
125	ITA	Alice Garlisi	319	2011/2012 season (100%)	0	0	0	0	0
125	ITA	Alice Garlisi	319	2010/2011 season (70%)	99	93	0	127	0
126	USA	Joelle Forte	318	2012/2013 season (100%)	0	0	0	0	0
126	USA	Joelle Forte	318	2011/2012 season (100%)	0	191	0	0	0
126	USA	Joelle Forte	318	2010/2011 season (70%)	0	0	0	127	0
127	KOR	Yea-Ji Yun	311	2012/2013 season (100%)	0	0	0	0	0
127	KOR	Yea-Ji Yun	311	2011/2012 season (100%)	126	0	0	0	0
127	KOR	Yea-Ji Yun	311	2010/2011 season (70%)	185	0	0	0	0
128	FIN	Alisa Mikonsaari	309	2012/2013 season (100%)	0	0	0	0	0
128	FIN	Alisa Mikonsaari	309	2011/2012 season (100%)	106	0	0	203	0
128	FIN	Alisa Mikonsaari	309	2010/2011 season (70%)	0	0	0	0	0
129	SUI	Romy Bühler	307	2012/2013 season (100%)	0	0	0	0	0
129	SUI	Romy Bühler	307	2011/2012 season (100%)	118	0	0	0	0
129	SUI	Romy Bühler	307	2010/2011 season (70%)	121	68	0	0	0
130	PHI	Melissa Bulanhagui	298	2012/2013 season (100%)	156	0	0	0	0
130	PHI	Melissa Bulanhagui	298	2011/2012 season (100%)	0	0	0	0	0
130	PHI	Melissa Bulanhagui	298	2010/2011 season (70%)	0	0	0	142	0
131	CAN	Kate Charbonneau	297	2012/2013 season (100%)	0	0	0	0	0
131	CAN	Kate Charbonneau	297	2011/2012 season (100%)	0	164	133	0	0
131	CAN	Kate Charbonneau	297	2010/2011 season (70%)	0	0	0	0	0
132	USA	Kristiene Gong	285	2012/2013 season (100%)	0	0	0	0	0
132	USA	Kristiene Gong	285	2011/2012 season (100%)	0	0	0	0	0
132	USA	Kristiene Gong	285	2010/2011 season (70%)	0	158	127	0	0
133	SUI	Myriam Leuenberger	284	2012/2013 season (100%)	0	0	0	182	0
133	SUI	Myriam Leuenberger	284	2011/2012 season (100%)	102	0	0	0	0
133	SUI	Myriam Leuenberger	284	2010/2011 season (70%)	0	0	0	0	0
134	LAT	Alina Fjodorova	281	2012/2013 season (100%)	0	0	0	0	0
134	LAT	Alina Fjodorova	281	2011/2012 season (100%)	173	108	0	0	0
134	LAT	Alina Fjodorova	281	2010/2011 season (70%)	0	0	0	0	0
135	USA	Amanda Dobbs	280	2012/2013 season (100%)	0	0	0	0	0
135	USA	Amanda Dobbs	280	2011/2012 season (100%)	0	0	0	0	0
135	USA	Amanda Dobbs	280	2010/2011 season (70%)	0	165	0	115	0
135	EST	Svetlana Issakova	280	2012/2013 season (100%)	0	0	0	182	0
135	EST	Svetlana Issakova	280	2011/2012 season (100%)	0	0	0	0	0
135	EST	Svetlana Issakova	280	2010/2011 season (70%)	98	0	0	0	0
137	TPE	Crystal Kiang	275	2012/2013 season (100%)	192	0	0	0	0
137	TPE	Crystal Kiang	275	2011/2012 season (100%)	83	0	0	0	0
137	TPE	Crystal Kiang	275	2010/2011 season (70%)	71	0	0	0	0
138	KOR	Chae-Yeon Suhr	266	2012/2013 season (100%)	0	0	0	0	0
138	KOR	Chae-Yeon Suhr	266	2011/2012 season (100%)	102	0	0	164	0
138	KOR	Chae-Yeon Suhr	266	2010/2011 season (70%)	0	0	0	0	0
139	PHI	Alisson Krystle Perticheto	247	2012/2013 season (100%)	83	0	0	164	0
139	PHI	Alisson Krystle Perticheto	247	2011/2012 season (100%)	0	0	0	0	0
139	PHI	Alisson Krystle Perticheto	247	2010/2011 season (70%)	0	0	0	0	0
140	RUS	Rosa Sheveleva	246	2012/2013 season (100%)	0	0	0	0	0
140	RUS	Rosa Sheveleva	246	2011/2012 season (100%)	0	0	0	0	0
140	RUS	Rosa Sheveleva	246	2010/2011 season (70%)	0	142	104	0	0
141	JPN	Ayumi Goto	242	2012/2013 season (100%)	0	0	0	0	0
141	JPN	Ayumi Goto	242	2011/2012 season (100%)	0	0	0	0	0
141	JPN	Ayumi Goto	242	2010/2011 season (70%)	0	84	0	158	0
141	ITA	Amelia Schwienbacher	242	2012/2013 season (100%)	0	0	0	0	0
141	ITA	Amelia Schwienbacher	242	2011/2012 season (100%)	0	0	0	0	0
141	ITA	Amelia Schwienbacher	242	2010/2011 season (70%)	0	0	0	127	115
143	UKR	Alina Milevskaia	240	2012/2013 season (100%)	0	0	0	164	0
143	UKR	Alina Milevskaia	240	2011/2012 season (100%)	0	0	0	0	0
143	UKR	Alina Milevskaia	240	2010/2011 season (70%)	0	76	0	0	0
144	THA	Mimi Tanasorn Chindasook	228	2012/2013 season (100%)	0	0	0	0	0
144	THA	Mimi Tanasorn Chindasook	228	2011/2012 season (100%)	140	0	0	0	0
144	THA	Mimi Tanasorn Chindasook	228	2010/2011 season (70%)	88	0	0	0	0
144	AUS	Cheltzie Lee	228	2012/2013 season (100%)	0	0	0	0	0
144	AUS	Cheltzie Lee	228	2011/2012 season (100%)	0	0	0	0	0
144	AUS	Cheltzie Lee	228	2010/2011 season (70%)	228	0	0	0	0
146	USA	Barbie Long	225	2012/2013 season (100%)	0	225	0	0	0
146	USA	Barbie Long	225	2011/2012 season (100%)	0	0	0	0	0
146	USA	Barbie Long	225	2010/2011 season (70%)	0	0	0	0	0
147	KOR	Ho Jung Lee	214	2012/2013 season (100%)	0	0	0	0	0
147	KOR	Ho Jung Lee	214	2011/2012 season (100%)	0	0	0	0	0
147	KOR	Ho Jung Lee	214	2010/2011 season (70%)	34	104	76	0	0
148	GER	Minami Hanashiro	203	2012/2013 season (100%)	0	0	0	203	0
148	GER	Minami Hanashiro	203	2011/2012 season (100%)	0	0	0	0	0
148	GER	Minami Hanashiro	203	2010/2011 season (70%)	0	0	0	0	0
148	ROU	Sabina Mariuta	203	2012/2013 season (100%)	0	0	0	203	0
148	ROU	Sabina Mariuta	203	2011/2012 season (100%)	0	0	0	0	0
148	ROU	Sabina Mariuta	203	2010/2011 season (70%)	0	0	0	0	0
148	RUS	Anna Ovcharova	203	2012/2013 season (100%)	0	0	0	0	0
148	RUS	Anna Ovcharova	203	2011/2012 season (100%)	0	0	0	203	0
148	RUS	Anna Ovcharova	203	2010/2011 season (70%)	0	0	0	0	0
151	THA	Sandra Khopon	192	2012/2013 season (100%)	0	0	0	0	0
151	THA	Sandra Khopon	192	2011/2012 season (100%)	192	0	0	0	0
151	THA	Sandra Khopon	192	2010/2011 season (70%)	0	0	0	0	0
152	JPN	Roanna Sari Oshikawa	191	2012/2013 season (100%)	0	0	0	0	0
152	JPN	Roanna Sari Oshikawa	191	2011/2012 season (100%)	0	0	0	0	0
152	JPN	Roanna Sari Oshikawa	191	2010/2011 season (70%)	0	115	76	0	0
152	CHN	Ying Zhang	191	2012/2013 season (100%)	0	191	0	0	0
152	CHN	Ying Zhang	191	2011/2012 season (100%)	0	0	0	0	0
152	CHN	Ying Zhang	191	2010/2011 season (70%)	0	0	0	0	0
154	DEN	Karina Johnson	183	2012/2013 season (100%)	0	0	0	0	0
154	DEN	Karina Johnson	183	2011/2012 season (100%)	74	0	0	0	0
154	DEN	Karina Johnson	183	2010/2011 season (70%)	109	0	0	0	0
155	NED	Michelle Couwenberg	182	2012/2013 season (100%)	0	0	0	182	0
155	NED	Michelle Couwenberg	182	2011/2012 season (100%)	0	0	0	0	0
155	NED	Michelle Couwenberg	182	2010/2011 season (70%)	0	0	0	0	0
155	FIN	Rosaliina Kuparinen	182	2012/2013 season (100%)	0	0	0	182	0
155	FIN	Rosaliina Kuparinen	182	2011/2012 season (100%)	0	0	0	0	0
155	FIN	Rosaliina Kuparinen	182	2010/2011 season (70%)	0	0	0	0	0
155	CRO	Mirna Libric	182	2012/2013 season (100%)	0	0	0	0	0
155	CRO	Mirna Libric	182	2011/2012 season (100%)	0	0	0	182	0
155	CRO	Mirna Libric	182	2010/2011 season (70%)	0	0	0	0	0
155	FIN	Leena Rissanen	182	2012/2013 season (100%)	0	0	0	182	0
155	FIN	Leena Rissanen	182	2011/2012 season (100%)	0	0	0	0	0
155	FIN	Leena Rissanen	182	2010/2011 season (70%)	0	0	0	0	0
159	CHN	Xiaowen Guo	175	2012/2013 season (100%)	55	120	0	0	0
159	CHN	Xiaowen Guo	175	2011/2012 season (100%)	0	0	0	0	0
159	CHN	Xiaowen Guo	175	2010/2011 season (70%)	0	0	0	0	0
159	GER	Katharina Häcker	175	2012/2013 season (100%)	0	0	0	0	0
159	GER	Katharina Häcker	175	2011/2012 season (100%)	0	0	0	0	0
159	GER	Katharina Häcker	175	2010/2011 season (70%)	0	0	0	175	0
159	CZE	Elizaveta Ukolova	175	2012/2013 season (100%)	0	120	0	0	0
159	CZE	Elizaveta Ukolova	175	2011/2012 season (100%)	55	0	0	0	0
159	CZE	Elizaveta Ukolova	175	2010/2011 season (70%)	0	0	0	0	0
162	AUT	Victoria Huebler	173	2012/2013 season (100%)	0	0	0	0	0
162	AUT	Victoria Huebler	173	2011/2012 season (100%)	0	108	0	0	0
162	AUT	Victoria Huebler	173	2010/2011 season (70%)	65	0	0	0	0
162	KOR	Yeon Jun Park	173	2012/2013 season (100%)	173	0	0	0	0
162	KOR	Yeon Jun Park	173	2011/2012 season (100%)	0	0	0	0	0
162	KOR	Yeon Jun Park	173	2010/2011 season (70%)	0	0	0	0	0
164	THA	Melanie Swang	171	2012/2013 season (100%)	0	0	0	0	0
164	THA	Melanie Swang	171	2011/2012 season (100%)	113	0	0	0	0
164	THA	Melanie Swang	171	2010/2011 season (70%)	58	0	0	0	0
165	JPN	Karen Kemanai	168	2012/2013 season (100%)	0	0	0	0	0
165	JPN	Karen Kemanai	168	2011/2012 season (100%)	0	0	0	0	0
165	JPN	Karen Kemanai	168	2010/2011 season (70%)	0	84	84	0	0
166	EST	Jasmine Alexandra Costa	164	2012/2013 season (100%)	0	0	0	0	0
166	EST	Jasmine Alexandra Costa	164	2011/2012 season (100%)	0	0	0	164	0
166	EST	Jasmine Alexandra Costa	164	2010/2011 season (70%)	0	0	0	0	0
166	ESP	Monica Gimeno	164	2012/2013 season (100%)	0	0	0	164	0
166	ESP	Monica Gimeno	164	2011/2012 season (100%)	0	0	0	0	0
166	ESP	Monica Gimeno	164	2010/2011 season (70%)	0	0	0	0	0
166	NOR	Camilla Gjersem	164	2012/2013 season (100%)	0	0	0	164	0
166	NOR	Camilla Gjersem	164	2011/2012 season (100%)	0	0	0	0	0
166	NOR	Camilla Gjersem	164	2010/2011 season (70%)	0	0	0	0	0
166	LTU	Inga Janulevičiūtė	164	2012/2013 season (100%)	0	0	0	164	0
166	LTU	Inga Janulevičiūtė	164	2011/2012 season (100%)	0	0	0	0	0
166	LTU	Inga Janulevičiūtė	164	2010/2011 season (70%)	0	0	0	0	0
166	USA	Katarina Kulgeyko	164	2012/2013 season (100%)	0	0	0	0	0
166	USA	Katarina Kulgeyko	164	2011/2012 season (100%)	0	164	0	0	0
166	USA	Katarina Kulgeyko	164	2010/2011 season (70%)	0	0	0	0	0
166	JPN	Satsuki Muramoto	164	2012/2013 season (100%)	0	0	0	164	0
166	JPN	Satsuki Muramoto	164	2011/2012 season (100%)	0	0	0	0	0
166	JPN	Satsuki Muramoto	164	2010/2011 season (70%)	0	0	0	0	0
166	FIN	Minna Parviainen	164	2012/2013 season (100%)	0	0	0	0	0
166	FIN	Minna Parviainen	164	2011/2012 season (100%)	0	0	0	164	0
166	FIN	Minna Parviainen	164	2010/2011 season (70%)	0	0	0	0	0
166	SLO	Pina Umek	164	2012/2013 season (100%)	0	0	0	164	0
166	SLO	Pina Umek	164	2011/2012 season (100%)	0	0	0	0	0
166	SLO	Pina Umek	164	2010/2011 season (70%)	0	0	0	0	0
166	NED	Larissa Van Der Linden	164	2012/2013 season (100%)	0	0	0	0	0
166	NED	Larissa Van Der Linden	164	2011/2012 season (100%)	0	0	0	164	0
166	NED	Larissa Van Der Linden	164	2010/2011 season (70%)	0	0	0	0	0
166	GER	Katharina Zientek	164	2012/2013 season (100%)	0	0	0	0	0
166	GER	Katharina Zientek	164	2011/2012 season (100%)	0	0	0	164	0
166	GER	Katharina Zientek	164	2010/2011 season (70%)	0	0	0	0	0
176	FIN	Timila Shrestha	160	2012/2013 season (100%)	0	0	0	0	0
176	FIN	Timila Shrestha	160	2011/2012 season (100%)	0	0	0	0	0
176	FIN	Timila Shrestha	160	2010/2011 season (70%)	0	84	76	0	0
177	JPN	Yuka Kouno	158	2012/2013 season (100%)	0	0	0	0	0
177	JPN	Yuka Kouno	158	2011/2012 season (100%)	0	0	0	0	0
177	JPN	Yuka Kouno	158	2010/2011 season (70%)	0	0	0	158	0
178	USA	Lauren Dinh	148	2012/2013 season (100%)	0	0	0	0	0
178	USA	Lauren Dinh	148	2011/2012 season (100%)	0	148	0	0	0
178	USA	Lauren Dinh	148	2010/2011 season (70%)	0	0	0	0	0
178	JPN	Hinano Isobe	148	2012/2013 season (100%)	0	148	0	0	0
178	JPN	Hinano Isobe	148	2011/2012 season (100%)	0	0	0	0	0
178	JPN	Hinano Isobe	148	2010/2011 season (70%)	0	0	0	0	0
178	JPN	Yura Matsuda	148	2012/2013 season (100%)	0	148	0	0	0
178	JPN	Yura Matsuda	148	2011/2012 season (100%)	0	0	0	0	0
178	JPN	Yura Matsuda	148	2010/2011 season (70%)	0	0	0	0	0
181	AUT	Miriam Ziegler	142	2012/2013 season (100%)	0	0	0	0	0
181	AUT	Miriam Ziegler	142	2011/2012 season (100%)	0	0	0	0	0
181	AUT	Miriam Ziegler	142	2010/2011 season (70%)	0	0	0	142	0
182	USA	Kristine Musademba	134	2012/2013 season (100%)	0	0	0	0	0
182	USA	Kristine Musademba	134	2011/2012 season (100%)	0	0	0	0	0
182	USA	Kristine Musademba	134	2010/2011 season (70%)	0	134	0	0	0
182	JPN	Fumie Suguri	134	2012/2013 season (100%)	0	0	0	0	0
182	JPN	Fumie Suguri	134	2011/2012 season (100%)	0	0	0	0	0
182	JPN	Fumie Suguri	134	2010/2011 season (70%)	0	134	0	0	0
184	SUI	Bettina Heim	127	2012/2013 season (100%)	0	0	0	0	0
184	SUI	Bettina Heim	127	2011/2012 season (100%)	0	0	0	0	0
184	SUI	Bettina Heim	127	2010/2011 season (70%)	0	0	0	127	0
184	POL	Anna Jurkiewicz	127	2012/2013 season (100%)	0	0	0	0	0
184	POL	Anna Jurkiewicz	127	2011/2012 season (100%)	0	0	0	0	0
184	POL	Anna Jurkiewicz	127	2010/2011 season (70%)	0	0	0	127	0
184	FIN	Jenni Saarinen	127	2012/2013 season (100%)	127	0	0	0	0
184	FIN	Jenni Saarinen	127	2011/2012 season (100%)	0	0	0	0	0
184	FIN	Jenni Saarinen	127	2010/2011 season (70%)	0	0	0	0	0
187	KOR	Chae-Hwa Kim	121	2012/2013 season (100%)	0	0	0	0	0
187	KOR	Chae-Hwa Kim	121	2011/2012 season (100%)	0	0	0	0	0
187	KOR	Chae-Hwa Kim	121	2010/2011 season (70%)	121	0	0	0	0
188	KOR	Hwi Choi	120	2012/2013 season (100%)	0	120	0	0	0
188	KOR	Hwi Choi	120	2011/2012 season (100%)	0	0	0	0	0
188	KOR	Hwi Choi	120	2010/2011 season (70%)	0	0	0	0	0
188	JPN	Mayako Matsuno	120	2012/2013 season (100%)	0	120	0	0	0
188	JPN	Mayako Matsuno	120	2011/2012 season (100%)	0	0	0	0	0
188	JPN	Mayako Matsuno	120	2010/2011 season (70%)	0	0	0	0	0
188	JPN	Yuka Nagai	120	2012/2013 season (100%)	0	120	0	0	0
188	JPN	Yuka Nagai	120	2011/2012 season (100%)	0	0	0	0	0
188	JPN	Yuka Nagai	120	2010/2011 season (70%)	0	0	0	0	0
191	SUI	Virginie Clerc	115	2012/2013 season (100%)	0	0	0	0	0
191	SUI	Virginie Clerc	115	2011/2012 season (100%)	0	0	0	0	0
191	SUI	Virginie Clerc	115	2010/2011 season (70%)	0	0	0	115	0
191	FRA	Candice Didier	115	2012/2013 season (100%)	0	0	0	0	0
191	FRA	Candice Didier	115	2011/2012 season (100%)	0	0	0	0	0
191	FRA	Candice Didier	115	2010/2011 season (70%)	0	0	0	115	0
191	USA	Nina Jiang	115	2012/2013 season (100%)	0	0	0	0	0
191	USA	Nina Jiang	115	2011/2012 season (100%)	0	0	0	0	0
191	USA	Nina Jiang	115	2010/2011 season (70%)	0	115	0	0	0
194	IND	Ami Parekh	113	2012/2013 season (100%)	113	0	0	0	0
194	IND	Ami Parekh	113	2011/2012 season (100%)	0	0	0	0	0
194	IND	Ami Parekh	113	2010/2011 season (70%)	0	0	0	0	0
195	POL	Alexandra Kamieniecki	108	2012/2013 season (100%)	0	0	0	0	0
195	POL	Alexandra Kamieniecki	108	2011/2012 season (100%)	0	108	0	0	0
195	POL	Alexandra Kamieniecki	108	2010/2011 season (70%)	0	0	0	0	0
195	CAN	Natasha Purich	108	2012/2013 season (100%)	0	0	0	0	0
195	CAN	Natasha Purich	108	2011/2012 season (100%)	0	108	0	0	0
195	CAN	Natasha Purich	108	2010/2011 season (70%)	0	0	0	0	0
195	FIN	Eveliina Viljanen	108	2012/2013 season (100%)	0	108	0	0	0
195	FIN	Eveliina Viljanen	108	2011/2012 season (100%)	0	0	0	0	0
195	FIN	Eveliina Viljanen	108	2010/2011 season (70%)	0	0	0	0	0
195	CHN	Jialei Wang	108	2012/2013 season (100%)	0	108	0	0	0
195	CHN	Jialei Wang	108	2011/2012 season (100%)	0	0	0	0	0
195	CHN	Jialei Wang	108	2010/2011 season (70%)	0	0	0	0	0
199	USA	McKinzie Daniels	97	2012/2013 season (100%)	0	0	0	0	0
199	USA	McKinzie Daniels	97	2011/2012 season (100%)	0	97	0	0	0
199	USA	McKinzie Daniels	97	2010/2011 season (70%)	0	0	0	0	0
199	RUS	Alexandra Deeva	97	2012/2013 season (100%)	0	0	0	0	0
199	RUS	Alexandra Deeva	97	2011/2012 season (100%)	0	97	0	0	0
199	RUS	Alexandra Deeva	97	2010/2011 season (70%)	0	0	0	0	0
199	JPN	Saya Ueno	97	2012/2013 season (100%)	0	0	0	0	0
199	JPN	Saya Ueno	97	2011/2012 season (100%)	0	97	0	0	0
199	JPN	Saya Ueno	97	2010/2011 season (70%)	0	0	0	0	0
202	UKR	Anna Khnychenkova	93	2012/2013 season (100%)	93	0	0	0	0
202	UKR	Anna Khnychenkova	93	2011/2012 season (100%)	0	0	0	0	0
202	UKR	Anna Khnychenkova	93	2010/2011 season (70%)	0	0	0	0	0
202	USA	Felicia Zhang	93	2012/2013 season (100%)	0	0	0	0	0
202	USA	Felicia Zhang	93	2011/2012 season (100%)	0	0	0	0	0
202	USA	Felicia Zhang	93	2010/2011 season (70%)	0	93	0	0	0
204	HUN	Viktória Pavuk	88	2012/2013 season (100%)	0	0	0	0	0
204	HUN	Viktória Pavuk	88	2011/2012 season (100%)	0	0	0	0	0
204	HUN	Viktória Pavuk	88	2010/2011 season (70%)	88	0	0	0	0
205	GER	Jessica Füssinger	84	2012/2013 season (100%)	0	0	0	0	0
205	GER	Jessica Füssinger	84	2011/2012 season (100%)	0	0	0	0	0
205	GER	Jessica Füssinger	84	2010/2011 season (70%)	0	84	0	0	0
206	UKR	Irina Movchan	83	2012/2013 season (100%)	0	0	0	0	0
206	UKR	Irina Movchan	83	2011/2012 season (100%)	0	0	0	0	0
206	UKR	Irina Movchan	83	2010/2011 season (70%)	83	0	0	0	0
207	AUS	Jaimee Nobbs	79	2012/2013 season (100%)	0	0	0	0	0
207	AUS	Jaimee Nobbs	79	2011/2012 season (100%)	0	0	0	0	0
207	AUS	Jaimee Nobbs	79	2010/2011 season (70%)	79	0	0	0	0
208	PHI	Zhaira Costiniano	74	2012/2013 season (100%)	0	0	0	0	0
208	PHI	Zhaira Costiniano	74	2011/2012 season (100%)	74	0	0	0	0
208	PHI	Zhaira Costiniano	74	2010/2011 season (70%)	0	0	0	0	0
209	LAT	Angelina Kuchvalska	68	2012/2013 season (100%)	68	0	0	0	0
209	LAT	Angelina Kuchvalska	68	2011/2012 season (100%)	0	0	0	0	0
209	LAT	Angelina Kuchvalska	68	2010/2011 season (70%)	0	0	0	0	0
209	GER	Julia Pfrengle	68	2012/2013 season (100%)	0	0	0	0	0
209	GER	Julia Pfrengle	68	2011/2012 season (100%)	0	0	0	0	0
209	GER	Julia Pfrengle	68	2010/2011 season (70%)	0	68	0	0	0
211	PHI	Mericien Venzon	64	2012/2013 season (100%)	0	0	0	0	0
211	PHI	Mericien Venzon	64	2011/2012 season (100%)	0	0	0	0	0
211	PHI	Mericien Venzon	64	2010/2011 season (70%)	64	0	0	0	0
212	HUN	Ivett Tóth	61	2012/2013 season (100%)	61	0	0	0	0
212	HUN	Ivett Tóth	61	2011/2012 season (100%)	0	0	0	0	0
212	HUN	Ivett Tóth	61	2010/2011 season (70%)	0	0	0	0	0
213	BUL	Hristina Vassileva	58	2012/2013 season (100%)	0	0	0	0	0
213	BUL	Hristina Vassileva	58	2011/2012 season (100%)	0	0	0	0	0
213	BUL	Hristina Vassileva	58	2010/2011 season (70%)	58	0	0	0	0
214	GER	Isabel Drescher	53	2012/2013 season (100%)	0	0	0	0	0
214	GER	Isabel Drescher	53	2011/2012 season (100%)	0	0	0	0	0
214	GER	Isabel Drescher	53	2010/2011 season (70%)	53	0	0	0	0
215	TPE	Chaochih Liu	52	2012/2013 season (100%)	0	0	0	0	0
215	TPE	Chaochih Liu	52	2011/2012 season (100%)	0	0	0	0	0
215	TPE	Chaochih Liu	52	2010/2011 season (70%)	52	0	0	0	0
216	GER	Nicole Schott	39	2012/2013 season (100%)	0	0	0	0	0
216	GER	Nicole Schott	39	2011/2012 season (100%)	0	0	0	0	0
216	GER	Nicole Schott	39	2010/2011 season (70%)	39	0	0	0	0

==== Pairs (80 couples) ====
As of 20 April 2013

Rank	Nation	Couple	Points	Season	ISU Championships or Olympics	(Junior) Grand Prix and Final		Selected International Competition	
Rank	Nation	Couple	Points	Season	Best	Best	2nd Best	Best	2nd Best
1	RUS	Tatiana Volosozhar / Maxim Trankov	5525	2012/2013 season (100%)	1200	800	400	250	0
1	RUS	Tatiana Volosozhar / Maxim Trankov	5525	2011/2012 season (100%)	1080	720	400	250	250
1	RUS	Tatiana Volosozhar / Maxim Trankov	5525	2010/2011 season (70%)	756	0	0	175	0
2	GER	Aliona Savchenko / Robin Szolkowy	4690	2012/2013 season (100%)	1080	400	0	250	0
2	GER	Aliona Savchenko / Robin Szolkowy	4690	2011/2012 season (100%)	1200	800	400	0	0
2	GER	Aliona Savchenko / Robin Szolkowy	4690	2010/2011 season (70%)	840	560	280	0	0
3	CAN	Meagan Duhamel / Eric Radford	3693	2012/2013 season (100%)	972	583	360	0	0
3	CAN	Meagan Duhamel / Eric Radford	3693	2011/2012 season (100%)	787	525	324	0	0
3	CAN	Meagan Duhamel / Eric Radford	3693	2010/2011 season (70%)	529	183	0	142	0
4	RUS	Vera Bazarova / Yuri Larionov	3642	2012/2013 season (100%)	638	720	400	0	0
4	RUS	Vera Bazarova / Yuri Larionov	3642	2011/2012 season (100%)	756	360	262	225	0
4	RUS	Vera Bazarova / Yuri Larionov	3642	2010/2011 season (70%)	551	368	252	175	0
5	CHN	Qing Pang / Jian Tong	3494	2012/2013 season (100%)	787	648	400	0	0
5	CHN	Qing Pang / Jian Tong	3494	2011/2012 season (100%)	875	0	0	0	0
5	CHN	Qing Pang / Jian Tong	3494	2010/2011 season (70%)	680	504	280	0	0
6	ITA	Stefania Berton / Ondrej Hotárek	3431	2012/2013 season (100%)	680	324	324	225	0
6	ITA	Stefania Berton / Ondrej Hotárek	3431	2011/2012 season (100%)	612	324	292	250	225
6	ITA	Stefania Berton / Ondrej Hotárek	3431	2010/2011 season (70%)	386	165	0	175	158
7	RUS	Yuko Kavaguti / Alexander Smirnov	3267	2012/2013 season (100%)	709	472	400	0	0
7	RUS	Yuko Kavaguti / Alexander Smirnov	3267	2011/2012 season (100%)	638	648	400	0	0
7	RUS	Yuko Kavaguti / Alexander Smirnov	3267	2010/2011 season (70%)	613	280	0	0	0
8	CAN	Kirsten Moore-Towers / Dylan Moscovitch	3066	2012/2013 season (100%)	875	525	360	250	0
8	CAN	Kirsten Moore-Towers / Dylan Moscovitch	3066	2011/2012 season (100%)	0	324	324	0	0
8	CAN	Kirsten Moore-Towers / Dylan Moscovitch	3066	2010/2011 season (70%)	402	330	252	0	0
9	RUS	Ksenia Stolbova / Fedor Klimov	2750	2012/2013 season (100%)	496	324	262	250	225
9	RUS	Ksenia Stolbova / Fedor Klimov	2750	2011/2012 season (100%)	680	292	213	0	0
9	RUS	Ksenia Stolbova / Fedor Klimov	2750	2010/2011 season (70%)	315	221	183	0	0
10	CHN	Wenjing Sui / Cong Han	2633	2012/2013 season (100%)	377	0	0	0	0
10	CHN	Wenjing Sui / Cong Han	2633	2011/2012 season (100%)	840	360	350	0	0
10	CHN	Wenjing Sui / Cong Han	2633	2010/2011 season (70%)	350	454	252	0	0
11	FRA	Vanessa James / Morgan Ciprès	2608	2012/2013 season (100%)	612	292	236	250	203
11	FRA	Vanessa James / Morgan Ciprès	2608	2011/2012 season (100%)	496	191	0	164	164
11	FRA	Vanessa James / Morgan Ciprès	2608	2010/2011 season (70%)	0	0	0	0	0
12	USA	Caydee Denney / John Coughlin	2386	2012/2013 season (100%)	0	324	324	225	0
12	USA	Caydee Denney / John Coughlin	2386	2011/2012 season (100%)	756	292	262	203	0
12	USA	Caydee Denney / John Coughlin	2386	2010/2011 season (70%)	0	0	0	0	0
13	CAN	Paige Lawrence / Rudi Swiegers	2363	2012/2013 season (100%)	496	292	292	225	0
13	CAN	Paige Lawrence / Rudi Swiegers	2363	2011/2012 season (100%)	446	191	0	164	0
13	CAN	Paige Lawrence / Rudi Swiegers	2363	2010/2011 season (70%)	476	227	183	0	0
14	USA	Marissa Castelli / Simon Shnapir	2115	2012/2013 season (100%)	680	324	262	250	0
14	USA	Marissa Castelli / Simon Shnapir	2115	2011/2012 season (100%)	0	213	0	182	0
14	USA	Marissa Castelli / Simon Shnapir	2115	2010/2011 season (70%)	0	204	165	0	0
15	GER	Maylin Hausch / Daniel Wende	2082	2012/2013 season (100%)	0	0	0	0	0
15	GER	Maylin Hausch / Daniel Wende	2082	2011/2012 season (100%)	446	191	0	250	182
15	GER	Maylin Hausch / Daniel Wende	2082	2010/2011 season (70%)	347	227	149	175	115
16	FRA	Daria Popova / Bruno Massot	1851	2012/2013 season (100%)	446	262	213	182	164
16	FRA	Daria Popova / Bruno Massot	1851	2011/2012 season (100%)	402	0	0	182	0
16	FRA	Daria Popova / Bruno Massot	1851	2010/2011 season (70%)	0	0	0	0	0
17	GER	Mari Vartmann / Aaron Van Cleave	1834	2012/2013 season (100%)	402	0	0	203	203
17	GER	Mari Vartmann / Aaron Van Cleave	1834	2011/2012 season (100%)	551	0	0	250	225
17	GER	Mari Vartmann / Aaron Van Cleave	1834	2010/2011 season (70%)	0	0	0	158	127
18	CHN	Xiaoyu Yu / Yang Jin	1736	2012/2013 season (100%)	365	230	225	0	0
18	CHN	Xiaoyu Yu / Yang Jin	1736	2011/2012 season (100%)	450	236	230	0	0
18	CHN	Xiaoyu Yu / Yang Jin	1736	2010/2011 season (70%)	0	199	175	0	0
19	CAN	Margaret Purdy / Michael Marinaro	1583	2012/2013 season (100%)	450	255	250	0	0
19	CAN	Margaret Purdy / Michael Marinaro	1583	2011/2012 season (100%)	328	203	97	0	0
19	CAN	Margaret Purdy / Michael Marinaro	1583	2010/2011 season (70%)	0	76	68	0	0
20	RUS	Katarina Gerboldt / Alexander Enbert	1519	2012/2013 season (100%)	0	0	0	0	0
20	RUS	Katarina Gerboldt / Alexander Enbert	1519	2011/2012 season (100%)	0	262	0	225	225
20	RUS	Katarina Gerboldt / Alexander Enbert	1519	2010/2011 season (70%)	428	204	0	175	0
21	ITA	Nicole Della Monica / Matteo Guarise	1469	2012/2013 season (100%)	362	213	213	203	0
21	ITA	Nicole Della Monica / Matteo Guarise	1469	2011/2012 season (100%)	275	0	0	203	0
21	ITA	Nicole Della Monica / Matteo Guarise	1469	2010/2011 season (70%)	0	0	0	0	0
22	USA	Mary Beth Marley / Rockne Brubaker	1377	2012/2013 season (100%)	0	0	0	0	0
22	USA	Mary Beth Marley / Rockne Brubaker	1377	2011/2012 season (100%)	680	213	0	203	0
22	USA	Mary Beth Marley / Rockne Brubaker	1377	2010/2011 season (70%)	281	0	0	0	0
23	USA	Haven Denney / Brandon Frazier	1300	2012/2013 season (100%)	500	182	0	0	0
23	USA	Haven Denney / Brandon Frazier	1300	2011/2012 season (100%)	365	133	120	0	0
23	USA	Haven Denney / Brandon Frazier	1300	2010/2011 season (70%)	0	0	0	0	0
24	USA	Britney Simpson / Matthew Blackmer	1250	2012/2013 season (100%)	194	164	164	0	0
24	USA	Britney Simpson / Matthew Blackmer	1250	2011/2012 season (100%)	194	284	250	0	0
24	USA	Britney Simpson / Matthew Blackmer	1250	2010/2011 season (70%)	0	0	0	0	0
25	RUS	Lina Fedorova / Maxim Miroshkin	1169	2012/2013 season (100%)	405	350	250	0	0
25	RUS	Lina Fedorova / Maxim Miroshkin	1169	2011/2012 season (100%)	0	164	0	0	0
25	RUS	Lina Fedorova / Maxim Miroshkin	1169	2010/2011 season (70%)	0	0	0	0	0
26	RUS	Vasilisa Davankova / Andrei Deputat	1127	2012/2013 season (100%)	0	315	225	182	0
26	RUS	Vasilisa Davankova / Andrei Deputat	1127	2011/2012 season (100%)	405	0	0	0	0
26	RUS	Vasilisa Davankova / Andrei Deputat	1127	2010/2011 season (70%)	0	0	0	0	0
27	ISR	Danielle Montalbano / Evgeni Krasnopolski	1115	2012/2013 season (100%)	0	213	0	203	0
27	ISR	Danielle Montalbano / Evgeni Krasnopolski	1115	2011/2012 season (100%)	293	0	0	203	203
27	ISR	Danielle Montalbano / Evgeni Krasnopolski	1115	2010/2011 season (70%)	0	0	0	0	0
28	CHN	Cheng Peng / Hao Zhang	1105	2012/2013 season (100%)	551	292	262	0	0
28	CHN	Cheng Peng / Hao Zhang	1105	2011/2012 season (100%)	0	0	0	0	0
28	CHN	Cheng Peng / Hao Zhang	1105	2010/2011 season (70%)	0	0	0	0	0
29	GBR	Stacey Kemp / David King	1070	2012/2013 season (100%)	325	0	0	0	0
29	GBR	Stacey Kemp / David King	1070	2011/2012 season (100%)	362	0	0	0	0
29	GBR	Stacey Kemp / David King	1070	2010/2011 season (70%)	281	134	134	115	0
30	USA	Tiffany Vise / Don Baldwin	1069	2012/2013 season (100%)	0	236	236	203	0
30	USA	Tiffany Vise / Don Baldwin	1069	2011/2012 season (100%)	0	236	0	0	0
30	USA	Tiffany Vise / Don Baldwin	1069	2010/2011 season (70%)	0	0	0	158	0
31	USA	Alexa Scimeca / Chris Knierim	1059	2012/2013 season (100%)	517	292	0	250	0
31	USA	Alexa Scimeca / Chris Knierim	1059	2011/2012 season (100%)	0	0	0	0	0
31	USA	Alexa Scimeca / Chris Knierim	1059	2010/2011 season (70%)	0	0	0	0	0
32	AUT	Stina Martini / Severin Kiefer	1054	2012/2013 season (100%)	237	0	0	182	164
32	AUT	Stina Martini / Severin Kiefer	1054	2011/2012 season (100%)	192	0	0	164	0
32	AUT	Stina Martini / Severin Kiefer	1054	2010/2011 season (70%)	134	0	0	115	0
33	RUS	Anastasia Martiusheva / Alexei Rogonov	949	2012/2013 season (100%)	0	262	262	0	0
33	RUS	Anastasia Martiusheva / Alexei Rogonov	949	2011/2012 season (100%)	0	0	0	250	0
33	RUS	Anastasia Martiusheva / Alexei Rogonov	949	2010/2011 season (70%)	0	0	0	175	0
34	CAN	Jessica Dube / Sebastien Wolfe	900	2012/2013 season (100%)	0	0	0	0	0
34	CAN	Jessica Dube / Sebastien Wolfe	900	2011/2012 season (100%)	402	262	236	0	0
34	CAN	Jessica Dube / Sebastien Wolfe	900	2010/2011 season (70%)	0	0	0	0	0
35	USA	Jessica Calalang / Zack Sidhu	868	2012/2013 season (100%)	215	148	120	0	0
35	USA	Jessica Calalang / Zack Sidhu	868	2011/2012 season (100%)	0	203	182	0	0
35	USA	Jessica Calalang / Zack Sidhu	868	2010/2011 season (70%)	0	68	0	0	0
36	USA	Felicia Zhang / Nathan Bartholomay	794	2012/2013 season (100%)	612	0	0	182	0
36	USA	Felicia Zhang / Nathan Bartholomay	794	2011/2012 season (100%)	0	0	0	0	0
36	USA	Felicia Zhang / Nathan Bartholomay	794	2010/2011 season (70%)	0	0	0	0	0
37	BLR	Lubov Bakirova / Mikalai Kamianchuk	778	2012/2013 season (100%)	0	0	0	0	0
37	BLR	Lubov Bakirova / Mikalai Kamianchuk	778	2011/2012 season (100%)	325	0	0	225	0
37	BLR	Lubov Bakirova / Mikalai Kamianchuk	778	2010/2011 season (70%)	228	0	0	0	0
38	CHN	Meiyi Li / Bo Jiang	771	2012/2013 season (100%)	157	120	0	0	0
38	CHN	Meiyi Li / Bo Jiang	771	2011/2012 season (100%)	215	182	97	0	0
38	CHN	Meiyi Li / Bo Jiang	771	2010/2011 season (70%)	0	0	0	0	0
39	USA	Gretchen Donlan / Andrew Speroff	770	2012/2013 season (100%)	0	236	0	225	182
39	USA	Gretchen Donlan / Andrew Speroff	770	2011/2012 season (100%)	0	0	0	0	0
39	USA	Gretchen Donlan / Andrew Speroff	770	2010/2011 season (70%)	0	0	0	127	0
40	GER	Katharina Gierok / Florian Just	752	2012/2013 season (100%)	0	0	0	0	0
40	GER	Katharina Gierok / Florian Just	752	2011/2012 season (100%)	0	0	0	225	164
40	GER	Katharina Gierok / Florian Just	752	2010/2011 season (70%)	205	0	0	158	0
40	CAN	Brittany Jones / Ian Beharry	752	2012/2013 season (100%)	295	250	207	0	0
40	CAN	Brittany Jones / Ian Beharry	752	2011/2012 season (100%)	0	0	0	0	0
40	CAN	Brittany Jones / Ian Beharry	752	2010/2011 season (70%)	0	0	0	0	0
42	RUS	Kamilla Gainetdinova / Ivan Bich	728	2012/2013 season (100%)	239	182	133	0	0
42	RUS	Kamilla Gainetdinova / Ivan Bich	728	2011/2012 season (100%)	174	0	0	0	0
42	RUS	Kamilla Gainetdinova / Ivan Bich	728	2010/2011 season (70%)	0	0	0	0	0
43	UKR	Julia Lavrentieva / Yuri Rudyk	692	2012/2013 season (100%)	293	0	0	164	0
43	UKR	Julia Lavrentieva / Yuri Rudyk	692	2011/2012 season (100%)	127	108	0	0	0
43	UKR	Julia Lavrentieva / Yuri Rudyk	692	2010/2011 season (70%)	80	0	0	0	0
44	CHN	Wenting Wang / Yan Zhang	682	2012/2013 season (100%)	446	236	0	0	0
44	CHN	Wenting Wang / Yan Zhang	682	2011/2012 season (100%)	0	0	0	0	0
44	CHN	Wenting Wang / Yan Zhang	682	2010/2011 season (70%)	0	0	0	0	0
45	RUS	Evgenia Tarasova / Vladimir Morozov	674	2012/2013 season (100%)	328	164	0	182	0
45	RUS	Evgenia Tarasova / Vladimir Morozov	674	2011/2012 season (100%)	0	0	0	0	0
45	RUS	Evgenia Tarasova / Vladimir Morozov	674	2010/2011 season (70%)	0	0	0	0	0
46	USA	Lindsay Davis / Mark Ladwig	613	2012/2013 season (100%)	0	236	213	164	0
46	USA	Lindsay Davis / Mark Ladwig	613	2011/2012 season (100%)	0	0	0	0	0
46	USA	Lindsay Davis / Mark Ladwig	613	2010/2011 season (70%)	0	0	0	0	0
47	CAN	Hayleigh Bell / Alistair Sylvester	612	2012/2013 season (100%)	174	148	133	0	0
47	CAN	Hayleigh Bell / Alistair Sylvester	612	2011/2012 season (100%)	157	0	0	0	0
47	CAN	Hayleigh Bell / Alistair Sylvester	612	2010/2011 season (70%)	0	0	0	0	0
48	POL	Magdalena Klatka / Radoslaw Chruscinski	599	2012/2013 season (100%)	192	0	0	0	0
48	POL	Magdalena Klatka / Radoslaw Chruscinski	599	2011/2012 season (100%)	141	133	133	0	0
48	POL	Magdalena Klatka / Radoslaw Chruscinski	599	2010/2011 season (70%)	89	0	0	0	0
49	GER	Annabelle Prölss / Ruben Blommaert	596	2012/2013 season (100%)	266	182	148	0	0
49	GER	Annabelle Prölss / Ruben Blommaert	596	2011/2012 season (100%)	0	0	0	0	0
49	GER	Annabelle Prölss / Ruben Blommaert	596	2010/2011 season (70%)	0	0	0	0	0
50	RUS	Tatiana Tudvaseva / Sergei Lisiev	518	2012/2013 season (100%)	0	108	0	0	0
50	RUS	Tatiana Tudvaseva / Sergei Lisiev	518	2011/2012 season (100%)	0	207	203	0	0
50	RUS	Tatiana Tudvaseva / Sergei Lisiev	518	2010/2011 season (70%)	0	0	0	0	0
50	CAN	Taylor Steele / Robert Schultz	518	2012/2013 season (100%)	0	0	0	0	0
50	CAN	Taylor Steele / Robert Schultz	518	2011/2012 season (100%)	0	213	0	0	0
50	CAN	Taylor Steele / Robert Schultz	518	2010/2011 season (70%)	0	178	127	0	0
52	RUS	Maria Vigalova / Egor Zakroev	509	2012/2013 season (100%)	0	284	225	0	0
52	RUS	Maria Vigalova / Egor Zakroev	509	2011/2012 season (100%)	0	0	0	0	0
52	RUS	Maria Vigalova / Egor Zakroev	509	2010/2011 season (70%)	0	0	0	0	0
53	USA	Madeline Aaron / Max Settlage	500	2012/2013 season (100%)	0	203	133	0	0
53	USA	Madeline Aaron / Max Settlage	500	2011/2012 season (100%)	0	164	0	0	0
53	USA	Madeline Aaron / Max Settlage	500	2010/2011 season (70%)	0	0	0	0	0
54	BUL	Elizaveta Makarova / Leri Kenchadze	428	2012/2013 season (100%)	264	0	0	164	0
54	BUL	Elizaveta Makarova / Leri Kenchadze	428	2011/2012 season (100%)	0	0	0	0	0
54	BUL	Elizaveta Makarova / Leri Kenchadze	428	2010/2011 season (70%)	0	0	0	0	0
55	POL	Natalia Kaliszek / Michal Kaliszek	346	2012/2013 season (100%)	0	0	0	0	0
55	POL	Natalia Kaliszek / Michal Kaliszek	346	2011/2012 season (100%)	0	0	0	182	164
55	POL	Natalia Kaliszek / Michal Kaliszek	346	2010/2011 season (70%)	0	0	0	0	0
56	USA	Jessica Pfund / Aj Reiss	297	2012/2013 season (100%)	0	164	133	0	0
56	USA	Jessica Pfund / Aj Reiss	297	2011/2012 season (100%)	0	0	0	0	0
56	USA	Jessica Pfund / Aj Reiss	297	2010/2011 season (70%)	0	0	0	0	0
57	POL	Marcelina Lech / Jakub Tyc	296	2012/2013 season (100%)	114	0	0	182	0
57	POL	Marcelina Lech / Jakub Tyc	296	2011/2012 season (100%)	0	0	0	0	0
57	POL	Marcelina Lech / Jakub Tyc	296	2010/2011 season (70%)	0	0	0	0	0
57	RUS	Valeria Grechukhina / Andrei Filonov	296	2012/2013 season (100%)	0	0	0	0	0
57	RUS	Valeria Grechukhina / Andrei Filonov	296	2011/2012 season (100%)	0	148	148	0	0
57	RUS	Valeria Grechukhina / Andrei Filonov	296	2010/2011 season (70%)	0	0	0	0	0
59	CAN	Natasha Purich / Sebastien Arcieri	245	2012/2013 season (100%)	0	148	97	0	0
59	CAN	Natasha Purich / Sebastien Arcieri	245	2011/2012 season (100%)	0	0	0	0	0
59	CAN	Natasha Purich / Sebastien Arcieri	245	2010/2011 season (70%)	0	0	0	0	0
60	CAN	Shalena Rau / Phelan Simpson	240	2012/2013 season (100%)	0	120	120	0	0
60	CAN	Shalena Rau / Phelan Simpson	240	2011/2012 season (100%)	0	0	0	0	0
60	CAN	Shalena Rau / Phelan Simpson	240	2010/2011 season (70%)	0	0	0	0	0
61	CZE	Alexandra Herbrikova / Rudy Halmaert	237	2012/2013 season (100%)	0	0	0	0	0
61	CZE	Alexandra Herbrikova / Rudy Halmaert	237	2011/2012 season (100%)	237	0	0	0	0
61	CZE	Alexandra Herbrikova / Rudy Halmaert	237	2010/2011 season (70%)	0	0	0	0	0
62	RUS	Julia Antipova / Nodari Maisuradze	225	2012/2013 season (100%)	0	0	0	225	0
62	RUS	Julia Antipova / Nodari Maisuradze	225	2011/2012 season (100%)	0	0	0	0	0
62	RUS	Julia Antipova / Nodari Maisuradze	225	2010/2011 season (70%)	0	0	0	0	0
62	USA	Tarah Kayne / Danny O'Shea	225	2012/2013 season (100%)	0	0	0	225	0
62	USA	Tarah Kayne / Danny O'Shea	225	2011/2012 season (100%)	0	0	0	0	0
62	USA	Tarah Kayne / Danny O'Shea	225	2010/2011 season (70%)	0	0	0	0	0
64	BLR	Maria Paliakova / Nikita Bochkov	214	2012/2013 season (100%)	214	0	0	0	0
64	BLR	Maria Paliakova / Nikita Bochkov	214	2011/2012 season (100%)	0	0	0	0	0
64	BLR	Maria Paliakova / Nikita Bochkov	214	2010/2011 season (70%)	0	0	0	0	0
65	GER	Vanessa Bauer / Nolan Seegert	205	2012/2013 season (100%)	0	108	97	0	0
65	GER	Vanessa Bauer / Nolan Seegert	205	2011/2012 season (100%)	0	0	0	0	0
65	GER	Vanessa Bauer / Nolan Seegert	205	2010/2011 season (70%)	0	0	0	0	0
65	CAN	Krystel Desjardins / Charlie Bilodeau	205	2012/2013 season (100%)	0	108	97	0	0
65	CAN	Krystel Desjardins / Charlie Bilodeau	205	2011/2012 season (100%)	0	0	0	0	0
65	CAN	Krystel Desjardins / Charlie Bilodeau	205	2010/2011 season (70%)	0	0	0	0	0
67	RUS	Tatiana Novik / Andrei Novoselov	182	2012/2013 season (100%)	0	0	0	0	0
67	RUS	Tatiana Novik / Andrei Novoselov	182	2011/2012 season (100%)	0	0	0	182	0
67	RUS	Tatiana Novik / Andrei Novoselov	182	2010/2011 season (70%)	0	0	0	0	0
67	SWE	Ronja Roll / Gustav Forsgren	182	2012/2013 season (100%)	0	0	0	0	0
67	SWE	Ronja Roll / Gustav Forsgren	182	2011/2012 season (100%)	0	0	0	182	0
67	SWE	Ronja Roll / Gustav Forsgren	182	2010/2011 season (70%)	0	0	0	0	0
69	USA	Deedee Leng / Timothy Leduc	164	2012/2013 season (100%)	0	0	0	164	0
69	USA	Deedee Leng / Timothy Leduc	164	2011/2012 season (100%)	0	0	0	0	0
69	USA	Deedee Leng / Timothy Leduc	164	2010/2011 season (70%)	0	0	0	0	0
70	USA	Molly Aaron / Daniyel Cohen	142	2012/2013 season (100%)	0	0	0	0	0
70	USA	Molly Aaron / Daniyel Cohen	142	2011/2012 season (100%)	0	0	0	0	0
70	USA	Molly Aaron / Daniyel Cohen	142	2010/2011 season (70%)	0	0	0	142	0
70	PRK	Ji Hyang Ri / Won Hyok Thae	142	2012/2013 season (100%)	0	0	0	0	0
70	PRK	Ji Hyang Ri / Won Hyok Thae	142	2011/2012 season (100%)	0	0	0	0	0
70	PRK	Ji Hyang Ri / Won Hyok Thae	142	2010/2011 season (70%)	0	0	0	142	0
72	ITA	Giulia Foresti / Leo Luca Sforza	141	2012/2013 season (100%)	141	0	0	0	0
72	ITA	Giulia Foresti / Leo Luca Sforza	141	2011/2012 season (100%)	0	0	0	0	0
72	ITA	Giulia Foresti / Leo Luca Sforza	141	2010/2011 season (70%)	0	0	0	0	0
73	USA	Olivia Oltmanns / Joshua Santillan	133	2012/2013 season (100%)	0	0	0	0	0
73	USA	Olivia Oltmanns / Joshua Santillan	133	2011/2012 season (100%)	0	133	0	0	0
73	USA	Olivia Oltmanns / Joshua Santillan	133	2010/2011 season (70%)	0	0	0	0	0
74	USA	Lindsay Davis / Themistocles Leftheris	127	2012/2013 season (100%)	0	0	0	0	0
74	USA	Lindsay Davis / Themistocles Leftheris	127	2011/2012 season (100%)	0	0	0	0	0
74	USA	Lindsay Davis / Themistocles Leftheris	127	2010/2011 season (70%)	0	0	0	127	0
74	BUL	Alexandra Malakhova / Leri Kenchadze	127	2012/2013 season (100%)	0	0	0	0	0
74	BUL	Alexandra Malakhova / Leri Kenchadze	127	2011/2012 season (100%)	0	0	0	0	0
74	BUL	Alexandra Malakhova / Leri Kenchadze	127	2010/2011 season (70%)	0	0	0	127	0
76	RUS	Ekaterina Kuklina / Maxim Petukhov	108	2012/2013 season (100%)	0	108	0	0	0
76	RUS	Ekaterina Kuklina / Maxim Petukhov	108	2011/2012 season (100%)	0	0	0	0	0
76	RUS	Ekaterina Kuklina / Maxim Petukhov	108	2010/2011 season (70%)	0	0	0	0	0
77	NED	Rachel Epstein / Dmitry Epstein	103	2012/2013 season (100%)	103	0	0	0	0
77	NED	Rachel Epstein / Dmitry Epstein	103	2011/2012 season (100%)	0	0	0	0	0
77	NED	Rachel Epstein / Dmitry Epstein	103	2010/2011 season (70%)	0	0	0	0	0
78	POL	Aleksandra Malinkiewicz / Sebastian Lofek	97	2012/2013 season (100%)	0	0	0	0	0
78	POL	Aleksandra Malinkiewicz / Sebastian Lofek	97	2011/2012 season (100%)	0	97	0	0	0
78	POL	Aleksandra Malinkiewicz / Sebastian Lofek	97	2010/2011 season (70%)	0	0	0	0	0
78	PRK	Kyong Mi Kang / Ju Sik Kim	97	2012/2013 season (100%)	0	97	0	0	0
78	PRK	Kyong Mi Kang / Ju Sik Kim	97	2011/2012 season (100%)	0	0	0	0	0
78	PRK	Kyong Mi Kang / Ju Sik Kim	97	2010/2011 season (70%)	0	0	0	0	0
80	USA	Morgan Agster / Adam Civiello	68	2012/2013 season (100%)	0	0	0	0	0
80	USA	Morgan Agster / Adam Civiello	68	2011/2012 season (100%)	0	0	0	0	0
80	USA	Morgan Agster / Adam Civiello	68	2010/2011 season (70%)	0	68	0	0	0

==== Ice dance (125 couples) ====
As of 20 April 2013

Rank	Nation	Couple	Points	Season	ISU Championships or Olympics	(Junior) Grand Prix and Final		Selected International Competition	
Rank	Nation	Couple	Points	Season	Best	Best	2nd Best	Best	2nd Best
1	USA	Meryl Davis / Charlie White	4840	2012/2013 season (100%)	1200	800	400	0	0
1	USA	Meryl Davis / Charlie White	4840	2011/2012 season (100%)	1080	800	400	0	0
1	USA	Meryl Davis / Charlie White	4840	2010/2011 season (70%)	840	560	280	0	0
2	CAN	Tessa Virtue / Scott Moir	4770	2012/2013 season (100%)	1080	720	400	0	0
2	CAN	Tessa Virtue / Scott Moir	4770	2011/2012 season (100%)	1200	720	400	250	0
2	CAN	Tessa Virtue / Scott Moir	4770	2010/2011 season (70%)	756	0	0	0	0
3	FRA	Nathalie Péchalat / Fabian Bourzat	4231	2012/2013 season (100%)	709	648	400	0	0
3	FRA	Nathalie Péchalat / Fabian Bourzat	4231	2011/2012 season (100%)	972	648	360	0	0
3	FRA	Nathalie Péchalat / Fabian Bourzat	4231	2010/2011 season (70%)	613	504	280	175	175
4	RUS	Ekaterina Bobrova / Dmitri Soloviev	3783	2012/2013 season (100%)	972	525	360	250	0
4	RUS	Ekaterina Bobrova / Dmitri Soloviev	3783	2011/2012 season (100%)	756	472	400	0	0
4	RUS	Ekaterina Bobrova / Dmitri Soloviev	3783	2010/2011 season (70%)	529	408	280	0	0
5	ITA	Anna Cappellini / Luca Lanotte	3733	2012/2013 season (100%)	875	583	360	225	0
5	ITA	Anna Cappellini / Luca Lanotte	3733	2011/2012 season (100%)	709	324	324	0	0
5	ITA	Anna Cappellini / Luca Lanotte	3733	2010/2011 season (70%)	402	183	0	175	158
6	CAN	Kaitlyn Weaver / Andrew Poje	3547	2012/2013 season (100%)	787	324	324	250	0
6	CAN	Kaitlyn Weaver / Andrew Poje	3547	2011/2012 season (100%)	875	583	360	0	0
6	CAN	Kaitlyn Weaver / Andrew Poje	3547	2010/2011 season (70%)	551	368	252	0	0
7	RUS	Elena Ilinykh / Nikita Katsalapov	3241	2012/2013 season (100%)	756	472	360	250	0
7	RUS	Elena Ilinykh / Nikita Katsalapov	3241	2011/2012 season (100%)	787	324	292	0	0
7	RUS	Elena Ilinykh / Nikita Katsalapov	3241	2010/2011 season (70%)	447	227	204	0	0
8	USA	Maia Shibutani / Alex Shibutani	3173	2012/2013 season (100%)	612	324	292	0	0
8	USA	Maia Shibutani / Alex Shibutani	3173	2011/2012 season (100%)	612	525	400	225	0
8	USA	Maia Shibutani / Alex Shibutani	3173	2010/2011 season (70%)	680	227	227	115	0
9	GER	Nelli Zhiganshina / Alexander Gazsi	2975	2012/2013 season (100%)	496	262	262	250	203
9	GER	Nelli Zhiganshina / Alexander Gazsi	2975	2011/2012 season (100%)	418	292	292	250	250
9	GER	Nelli Zhiganshina / Alexander Gazsi	2975	2010/2011 season (70%)	312	0	0	175	158
10	GBR	Penny Coomes / Nicholas Buckland	2789	2012/2013 season (100%)	551	236	213	250	0
10	GBR	Penny Coomes / Nicholas Buckland	2789	2011/2012 season (100%)	496	292	0	250	225
10	GBR	Penny Coomes / Nicholas Buckland	2789	2010/2011 season (70%)	173	134	134	142	127
11	RUS	Ekaterina Riazanova / Ilia Tkachenko	2757	2012/2013 season (100%)	612	324	324	250	0
11	RUS	Ekaterina Riazanova / Ilia Tkachenko	2757	2011/2012 season (100%)	551	292	262	0	0
11	RUS	Ekaterina Riazanova / Ilia Tkachenko	2757	2010/2011 season (70%)	347	252	183	142	0
12	FRA	Pernelle Carron / Lloyd Jones	2625	2012/2013 season (100%)	377	213	191	250	0
12	FRA	Pernelle Carron / Lloyd Jones	2625	2011/2012 season (100%)	446	324	236	225	0
12	FRA	Pernelle Carron / Lloyd Jones	2625	2010/2011 season (70%)	264	204	183	175	175
13	AZE	Julia Zlobina / Alexei Sitnikov	2172	2012/2013 season (100%)	446	262	236	225	225
13	AZE	Julia Zlobina / Alexei Sitnikov	2172	2011/2012 season (100%)	325	0	0	250	203
13	AZE	Julia Zlobina / Alexei Sitnikov	2172	2010/2011 season (70%)	0	0	0	0	0
14	USA	Madison Chock / Evan Bates	2161	2012/2013 season (100%)	680	292	0	250	182
14	USA	Madison Chock / Evan Bates	2161	2011/2012 season (100%)	0	292	262	203	0
14	USA	Madison Chock / Evan Bates	2161	2010/2011 season (70%)	0	0	0	0	0
15	JPN	Cathy Reed / Chris Reed	2088	2012/2013 season (100%)	446	262	0	225	225
15	JPN	Cathy Reed / Chris Reed	2088	2011/2012 season (100%)	0	213	0	182	0
15	JPN	Cathy Reed / Chris Reed	2088	2010/2011 season (70%)	237	149	149	0	0
16	RUS	Alexandra Stepanova / Ivan Bukin	2084	2012/2013 season (100%)	500	350	250	0	0
16	RUS	Alexandra Stepanova / Ivan Bukin	2084	2011/2012 season (100%)	450	284	250	0	0
16	RUS	Alexandra Stepanova / Ivan Bukin	2084	2010/2011 season (70%)	0	199	175	0	0
17	LTU	Isabella Tobias / Deividas Stagniūnas	1936	2012/2013 season (100%)	275	0	0	225	182
17	LTU	Isabella Tobias / Deividas Stagniūnas	1936	2011/2012 season (100%)	362	324	262	164	0
17	LTU	Isabella Tobias / Deividas Stagniūnas	1936	2010/2011 season (70%)	213	0	0	142	0
18	RUS	Victoria Sinitsina / Ruslan Zhiganshin	1910	2012/2013 season (100%)	0	324	236	250	0
18	RUS	Victoria Sinitsina / Ruslan Zhiganshin	1910	2011/2012 season (100%)	500	350	250	0	0
18	RUS	Victoria Sinitsina / Ruslan Zhiganshin	1910	2010/2011 season (70%)	0	221	158	0	0
19	ITA	Charlene Guignard / Marco Fabbri	1845	2012/2013 season (100%)	362	262	0	250	203
19	ITA	Charlene Guignard / Marco Fabbri	1845	2011/2012 season (100%)	293	0	0	250	225
19	ITA	Charlene Guignard / Marco Fabbri	1845	2010/2011 season (70%)	126	0	0	142	142
20	USA	Alexandra Aldridge / Daniel Eaton	1824	2012/2013 season (100%)	405	284	250	0	0
20	USA	Alexandra Aldridge / Daniel Eaton	1824	2011/2012 season (100%)	405	255	225	0	0
20	USA	Alexandra Aldridge / Daniel Eaton	1824	2010/2011 season (70%)	0	127	104	0	0
21	USA	Madison Hubbell / Zachary Donohue	1794	2012/2013 season (100%)	0	292	262	203	0
21	USA	Madison Hubbell / Zachary Donohue	1794	2011/2012 season (100%)	551	236	0	250	0
21	USA	Madison Hubbell / Zachary Donohue	1794	2010/2011 season (70%)	0	0	0	0	0
22	RUS	Ekaterina Pushkash / Jonathan Guerreiro	1769	2012/2013 season (100%)	0	213	0	225	164
22	RUS	Ekaterina Pushkash / Jonathan Guerreiro	1769	2011/2012 season (100%)	0	236	213	225	0
22	RUS	Ekaterina Pushkash / Jonathan Guerreiro	1769	2010/2011 season (70%)	315	178	175	0	0
23	FRA	Gabriella Papadakis / Guillaume Cizeron	1707	2012/2013 season (100%)	450	315	250	0	0
23	FRA	Gabriella Papadakis / Guillaume Cizeron	1707	2011/2012 season (100%)	328	182	182	0	0
23	FRA	Gabriella Papadakis / Guillaume Cizeron	1707	2010/2011 season (70%)	110	142	127	0	0
24	ITA	Lorenza Alessandrini / Simone Vaturi	1683	2012/2013 season (100%)	0	236	0	225	203
24	ITA	Lorenza Alessandrini / Simone Vaturi	1683	2011/2012 season (100%)	247	262	0	225	164
24	ITA	Lorenza Alessandrini / Simone Vaturi	1683	2010/2011 season (70%)	121	0	0	158	0
25	CAN	Nicole Orford / Thomas Williams	1672	2012/2013 season (100%)	496	292	191	0	0
25	CAN	Nicole Orford / Thomas Williams	1672	2011/2012 season (100%)	295	250	148	0	0
25	CAN	Nicole Orford / Thomas Williams	1672	2010/2011 season (70%)	167	142	115	0	0
26	CHN	Xintong Huang / Xun Zheng	1648	2012/2013 season (100%)	0	213	213	0	0
26	CHN	Xintong Huang / Xun Zheng	1648	2011/2012 season (100%)	377	262	236	0	0
26	CHN	Xintong Huang / Xun Zheng	1648	2010/2011 season (70%)	347	183	183	0	0
27	CHN	Xiaoyang Yu / Chen Wang	1560	2012/2013 season (100%)	362	191	191	0	0
27	CHN	Xiaoyang Yu / Chen Wang	1560	2011/2012 season (100%)	446	236	0	0	0
27	CHN	Xiaoyang Yu / Chen Wang	1560	2010/2011 season (70%)	312	134	0	0	0
28	GER	Tanja Kolbe / Stefano Caruso	1504	2012/2013 season (100%)	402	0	0	203	182
28	GER	Tanja Kolbe / Stefano Caruso	1504	2011/2012 season (100%)	264	0	0	250	203
28	GER	Tanja Kolbe / Stefano Caruso	1504	2010/2011 season (70%)	0	0	0	142	0
29	UKR	Siobhan Heekin-Canedy / Dmitri Dun	1483	2012/2013 season (100%)	305	0	0	250	225
29	UKR	Siobhan Heekin-Canedy / Dmitri Dun	1483	2011/2012 season (100%)	275	0	0	225	203
29	UKR	Siobhan Heekin-Canedy / Dmitri Dun	1483	2010/2011 season (70%)	0	0	0	0	0
30	EST	Irina Shtork / Taavi Rand	1481	2012/2013 season (100%)	293	0	0	225	203
30	EST	Irina Shtork / Taavi Rand	1481	2011/2012 season (100%)	214	225	133	0	0
30	EST	Irina Shtork / Taavi Rand	1481	2010/2011 season (70%)	136	104	84	0	0
31	UZB	Anna Nagornyuk / Viktor Kovalenko	1479	2012/2013 season (100%)	325	182	120	182	0
31	UZB	Anna Nagornyuk / Viktor Kovalenko	1479	2011/2012 season (100%)	402	148	120	0	0
31	UZB	Anna Nagornyuk / Viktor Kovalenko	1479	2010/2011 season (70%)	0	0	0	0	0
32	RUS	Ksenia Monko / Kirill Khaliavin	1438	2012/2013 season (100%)	0	236	0	250	182
32	RUS	Ksenia Monko / Kirill Khaliavin	1438	2011/2012 season (100%)	0	0	0	0	0
32	RUS	Ksenia Monko / Kirill Khaliavin	1438	2010/2011 season (70%)	350	245	175	0	0
33	RUS	Anna Yanovskaya / Sergey Mozgov	1410	2012/2013 season (100%)	0	255	225	0	0
33	RUS	Anna Yanovskaya / Sergey Mozgov	1410	2011/2012 season (100%)	365	315	250	0	0
33	RUS	Anna Yanovskaya / Sergey Mozgov	1410	2010/2011 season (70%)	0	0	0	0	0
34	USA	Lynn Kriengkrairut / Logan Giulietti-Schmitt	1396	2012/2013 season (100%)	0	292	0	250	203
34	USA	Lynn Kriengkrairut / Logan Giulietti-Schmitt	1396	2011/2012 season (100%)	0	236	0	250	0
34	USA	Lynn Kriengkrairut / Logan Giulietti-Schmitt	1396	2010/2011 season (70%)	0	165	0	0	0
35	RUS	Evgenia Kosigina / Nikolai Moroshkin	1380	2012/2013 season (100%)	295	225	225	0	0
35	RUS	Evgenia Kosigina / Nikolai Moroshkin	1380	2011/2012 season (100%)	0	225	203	0	0
35	RUS	Evgenia Kosigina / Nikolai Moroshkin	1380	2010/2011 season (70%)	207	175	145	0	0
36	CAN	Piper Gilles / Paul Poirier	1329	2012/2013 season (100%)	551	292	236	250	0
36	CAN	Piper Gilles / Paul Poirier	1329	2011/2012 season (100%)	0	0	0	0	0
36	CAN	Piper Gilles / Paul Poirier	1329	2010/2011 season (70%)	0	0	0	0	0
37	ESP	Sara Hurtado / Adria Diaz	1316	2012/2013 season (100%)	192	0	0	225	0
37	ESP	Sara Hurtado / Adria Diaz	1316	2011/2012 season (100%)	180	191	0	203	0
37	ESP	Sara Hurtado / Adria Diaz	1316	2010/2011 season (70%)	151	115	68	142	0
38	CAN	Kharis Ralph / Asher Hill	1309	2012/2013 season (100%)	0	191	0	0	0
38	CAN	Kharis Ralph / Asher Hill	1309	2011/2012 season (100%)	339	262	0	203	0
38	CAN	Kharis Ralph / Asher Hill	1309	2010/2011 season (70%)	0	165	149	0	0
39	CAN	Alexandra Paul / Mitchell Islam	1280	2012/2013 season (100%)	0	0	0	225	164
39	CAN	Alexandra Paul / Mitchell Islam	1280	2011/2012 season (100%)	496	191	0	0	0
39	CAN	Alexandra Paul / Mitchell Islam	1280	2010/2011 season (70%)	0	204	0	0	0
40	RUS	Valeria Zenkova / Valerie Sinitsin	1273	2012/2013 season (100%)	365	250	230	0	0
40	RUS	Valeria Zenkova / Valerie Sinitsin	1273	2011/2012 season (100%)	0	225	203	0	0
40	RUS	Valeria Zenkova / Valerie Sinitsin	1273	2010/2011 season (70%)	0	127	0	0	0
41	RUS	Kristina Gorshkova / Vitali Butikov	1228	2012/2013 season (100%)	0	0	0	182	0
41	RUS	Kristina Gorshkova / Vitali Butikov	1228	2011/2012 season (100%)	0	213	0	164	0
41	RUS	Kristina Gorshkova / Vitali Butikov	1228	2010/2011 season (70%)	0	204	165	158	142
42	GER	Shari Koch / Christian Nüchtern	1225	2012/2013 season (100%)	239	225	182	0	0
42	GER	Shari Koch / Christian Nüchtern	1225	2011/2012 season (100%)	215	182	182	0	0
42	GER	Shari Koch / Christian Nüchtern	1225	2010/2011 season (70%)	0	0	0	0	0
43	CZE	Lucie Myslivecková / Neil Brown	1153	2012/2013 season (100%)	214	0	0	225	203
43	CZE	Lucie Myslivecková / Neil Brown	1153	2011/2012 season (100%)	126	0	0	203	182
43	CZE	Lucie Myslivecková / Neil Brown	1153	2010/2011 season (70%)	0	0	0	0	0
44	AUS	Danielle O'Brien / Gregory Merriman	1149	2012/2013 season (100%)	402	0	0	203	182
44	AUS	Danielle O'Brien / Gregory Merriman	1149	2011/2012 season (100%)	362	0	0	0	0
44	AUS	Danielle O'Brien / Gregory Merriman	1149	2010/2011 season (70%)	253	0	0	0	0
45	HUN	Zsuzsanna Nagy / Mate Fejes	1128	2012/2013 season (100%)	173	0	0	203	164
45	HUN	Zsuzsanna Nagy / Mate Fejes	1128	2011/2012 season (100%)	156	0	0	250	182
45	HUN	Zsuzsanna Nagy / Mate Fejes	1128	2010/2011 season (70%)	0	0	0	115	0
46	CAN	Mackenzie Bent / Garrett MacKeen	1080	2012/2013 season (100%)	328	203	182	0	0
46	CAN	Mackenzie Bent / Garrett MacKeen	1080	2011/2012 season (100%)	0	203	164	0	0
46	CAN	Mackenzie Bent / Garrett MacKeen	1080	2010/2011 season (70%)	0	0	0	0	0
47	GBR	Louise Walden / Owen Edwards	1067	2012/2013 season (100%)	0	0	0	0	0
47	GBR	Louise Walden / Owen Edwards	1067	2011/2012 season (100%)	237	0	0	203	164
47	GBR	Louise Walden / Owen Edwards	1067	2010/2011 season (70%)	113	0	0	175	175
48	SUI	Ramona Elsener / Florian Roost	986	2012/2013 season (100%)	140	0	0	203	0
48	SUI	Ramona Elsener / Florian Roost	986	2011/2012 season (100%)	0	0	0	182	164
48	SUI	Ramona Elsener / Florian Roost	986	2010/2011 season (70%)	89	93	0	115	0
49	RUS	Valeria Starygina / Ivan Volobuiev	903	2012/2013 season (100%)	0	0	0	225	203
49	RUS	Valeria Starygina / Ivan Volobuiev	903	2011/2012 season (100%)	0	0	0	250	225
49	RUS	Valeria Starygina / Ivan Volobuiev	903	2010/2011 season (70%)	0	0	0	115	0
50	ITA	Sofia Sforza / Francesco Fioretti	884	2012/2013 season (100%)	141	148	0	0	0
50	ITA	Sofia Sforza / Francesco Fioretti	884	2011/2012 season (100%)	194	164	133	0	0
50	ITA	Sofia Sforza / Francesco Fioretti	884	2010/2011 season (70%)	48	104	84	0	0
51	TUR	Alisa Agafonova / Alper Uçar	880	2012/2013 season (100%)	237	0	0	182	164
51	TUR	Alisa Agafonova / Alper Uçar	880	2011/2012 season (100%)	0	0	0	182	0
51	TUR	Alisa Agafonova / Alper Uçar	880	2010/2011 season (70%)	0	0	0	115	0
52	USA	Anastasia Cannuscio / Colin McManus	848	2012/2013 season (100%)	0	213	0	0	0
52	USA	Anastasia Cannuscio / Colin McManus	848	2011/2012 season (100%)	0	0	0	164	0
52	USA	Anastasia Cannuscio / Colin McManus	848	2010/2011 season (70%)	186	158	127	0	0
53	FRA	Tiffany Zahorski / Alexis Miart	791	2012/2013 season (100%)	0	0	0	0	0
53	FRA	Tiffany Zahorski / Alexis Miart	791	2011/2012 season (100%)	0	0	0	250	0
53	FRA	Tiffany Zahorski / Alexis Miart	791	2010/2011 season (70%)	256	158	127	0	0
54	CAN	Andreanne Poulin / Marc-Andre Servant	749	2012/2013 season (100%)	0	203	203	0	0
54	CAN	Andreanne Poulin / Marc-Andre Servant	749	2011/2012 season (100%)	68	148	0	0	0
54	CAN	Andreanne Poulin / Marc-Andre Servant	749	2010/2011 season (70%)	0	127	0	0	0
55	CAN	Madeline Edwards / Zhao Kai Pang	727	2012/2013 season (100%)	157	203	203	0	0
55	CAN	Madeline Edwards / Zhao Kai Pang	727	2011/2012 season (100%)	0	164	0	0	0
55	CAN	Madeline Edwards / Zhao Kai Pang	727	2010/2011 season (70%)	0	0	0	0	0
56	AUT	Barbora Silná / Juri Kurakin	668	2012/2013 season (100%)	0	0	0	164	0
56	AUT	Barbora Silná / Juri Kurakin	668	2011/2012 season (100%)	0	0	0	225	164
56	AUT	Barbora Silná / Juri Kurakin	668	2010/2011 season (70%)	0	0	0	115	0
57	USA	Kaitlin Hawayek / Jean-Luc Baker	655	2012/2013 season (100%)	266	225	164	0	0
57	USA	Kaitlin Hawayek / Jean-Luc Baker	655	2011/2012 season (100%)	0	0	0	0	0
57	USA	Kaitlin Hawayek / Jean-Luc Baker	655	2010/2011 season (70%)	0	0	0	0	0
58	AUT	Kira Geil / Tobias Eisenbauer	639	2012/2013 season (100%)	0	0	0	0	0
58	AUT	Kira Geil / Tobias Eisenbauer	639	2011/2012 season (100%)	0	0	0	203	182
58	AUT	Kira Geil / Tobias Eisenbauer	639	2010/2011 season (70%)	0	0	0	127	127
59	UKR	Alexandra Nazarova / Maxim Nikitin	595	2012/2013 season (100%)	174	164	164	0	0
59	UKR	Alexandra Nazarova / Maxim Nikitin	595	2011/2012 season (100%)	0	0	0	0	0
59	UKR	Alexandra Nazarova / Maxim Nikitin	595	2010/2011 season (70%)	0	93	0	0	0
60	USA	Rachel Parsons / Michael Parsons	573	2012/2013 season (100%)	0	203	148	0	0
60	USA	Rachel Parsons / Michael Parsons	573	2011/2012 season (100%)	114	108	0	0	0
60	USA	Rachel Parsons / Michael Parsons	573	2010/2011 season (70%)	0	0	0	0	0
61	CZE	Karolina Prochazkova / Michal Ceska	568	2012/2013 season (100%)	0	133	133	0	0
61	CZE	Karolina Prochazkova / Michal Ceska	568	2011/2012 season (100%)	0	182	120	0	0
61	CZE	Karolina Prochazkova / Michal Ceska	568	2010/2011 season (70%)	0	104	76	0	0
62	RUS	Daria Morozova / Mikhail Zhirnov	549	2012/2013 season (100%)	0	203	182	0	0
62	RUS	Daria Morozova / Mikhail Zhirnov	549	2011/2012 season (100%)	0	164	0	0	0
62	RUS	Daria Morozova / Mikhail Zhirnov	549	2010/2011 season (70%)	0	0	0	0	0
63	USA	Lorraine McNamara / Quinn Carpenter	545	2012/2013 season (100%)	215	182	148	0	0
63	USA	Lorraine McNamara / Quinn Carpenter	545	2011/2012 season (100%)	0	0	0	0	0
63	USA	Lorraine McNamara / Quinn Carpenter	545	2010/2011 season (70%)	0	0	0	0	0
64	FRA	Estelle Elizabeth / Romain Le Gac	536	2012/2013 season (100%)	114	97	97	0	0
64	FRA	Estelle Elizabeth / Romain Le Gac	536	2011/2012 season (100%)	0	120	108	0	0
64	FRA	Estelle Elizabeth / Romain Le Gac	536	2010/2011 season (70%)	0	0	0	0	0
65	CAN	Victoria Hasegawa / Connor Hasegawa	529	2012/2013 season (100%)	0	133	0	0	0
65	CAN	Victoria Hasegawa / Connor Hasegawa	529	2011/2012 season (100%)	0	164	164	0	0
65	CAN	Victoria Hasegawa / Connor Hasegawa	529	2010/2011 season (70%)	0	68	0	0	0
66	SVK	Federica Testa / Lukáš Csölley	502	2012/2013 season (100%)	156	0	0	182	164
66	SVK	Federica Testa / Lukáš Csölley	502	2011/2012 season (100%)	0	0	0	0	0
66	SVK	Federica Testa / Lukáš Csölley	502	2010/2011 season (70%)	0	0	0	0	0
67	GBR	Charlotte Aiken / Josh Whidborne	501	2012/2013 season (100%)	0	0	0	203	164
67	GBR	Charlotte Aiken / Josh Whidborne	501	2011/2012 season (100%)	0	0	0	0	0
67	GBR	Charlotte Aiken / Josh Whidborne	501	2010/2011 season (70%)	58	76	0	0	0
68	CAN	Noa Bruser / Timothy Lum	494	2012/2013 season (100%)	0	182	164	0	0
68	CAN	Noa Bruser / Timothy Lum	494	2011/2012 season (100%)	0	148	0	0	0
68	CAN	Noa Bruser / Timothy Lum	494	2010/2011 season (70%)	0	0	0	0	0
69	TUR	Cagla Demirsal / Berk Akalin	482	2012/2013 season (100%)	127	164	108	0	0
69	TUR	Cagla Demirsal / Berk Akalin	482	2011/2012 season (100%)	83	0	0	0	0
69	TUR	Cagla Demirsal / Berk Akalin	482	2010/2011 season (70%)	0	0	0	0	0
70	FIN	Sara Aghai / Jussiville Partanen	467	2012/2013 season (100%)	0	108	0	0	0
70	FIN	Sara Aghai / Jussiville Partanen	467	2011/2012 season (100%)	103	148	108	0	0
70	FIN	Sara Aghai / Jussiville Partanen	467	2010/2011 season (70%)	0	0	0	0	0
71	RUS	Sofia Evdokimova / Egor Bazin	430	2012/2013 season (100%)	0	164	133	0	0
71	RUS	Sofia Evdokimova / Egor Bazin	430	2011/2012 season (100%)	0	133	0	0	0
71	RUS	Sofia Evdokimova / Egor Bazin	430	2010/2011 season (70%)	0	0	0	0	0
72	KAZ	Karina Uzurova / Ilias Ali	428	2012/2013 season (100%)	0	133	97	0	0
72	KAZ	Karina Uzurova / Ilias Ali	428	2011/2012 season (100%)	0	133	0	0	0
72	KAZ	Karina Uzurova / Ilias Ali	428	2010/2011 season (70%)	65	0	0	0	0
73	CHN	Yiyi Zhang / Nan Wu	411	2012/2013 season (100%)	83	0	0	0	0
73	CHN	Yiyi Zhang / Nan Wu	411	2011/2012 season (100%)	127	97	0	0	0
73	CHN	Yiyi Zhang / Nan Wu	411	2010/2011 season (70%)	0	104	0	0	0
74	GER	Carolina Hermann / Daniel Hermann	406	2012/2013 season (100%)	0	0	0	0	0
74	GER	Carolina Hermann / Daniel Hermann	406	2011/2012 season (100%)	0	0	0	203	203
74	GER	Carolina Hermann / Daniel Hermann	406	2010/2011 season (70%)	0	0	0	0	0
75	LAT	Ksenia Pecherkina / Aleksandrs Jakushin	394	2012/2013 season (100%)	0	0	0	0	0
75	LAT	Ksenia Pecherkina / Aleksandrs Jakushin	394	2011/2012 season (100%)	141	133	120	0	0
75	LAT	Ksenia Pecherkina / Aleksandrs Jakushin	394	2010/2011 season (70%)	0	0	0	0	0
76	BLR	Viktoria Kavaliova / Yurii Bieliaiev	379	2012/2013 season (100%)	0	108	0	0	0
76	BLR	Viktoria Kavaliova / Yurii Bieliaiev	379	2011/2012 season (100%)	75	120	0	0	0
76	BLR	Viktoria Kavaliova / Yurii Bieliaiev	379	2010/2011 season (70%)	0	76	0	0	0
77	ITA	Federica Bernardi / Christopher Mior	364	2012/2013 season (100%)	0	0	0	182	182
77	ITA	Federica Bernardi / Christopher Mior	364	2011/2012 season (100%)	0	0	0	0	0
77	ITA	Federica Bernardi / Christopher Mior	364	2010/2011 season (70%)	0	0	0	0	0
78	UKR	Daria Korotitskaia / Maksim Spodirev	346	2012/2013 season (100%)	0	182	164	0	0
78	UKR	Daria Korotitskaia / Maksim Spodirev	346	2011/2012 season (100%)	0	0	0	0	0
78	UKR	Daria Korotitskaia / Maksim Spodirev	346	2010/2011 season (70%)	0	0	0	0	0
78	POL	Natalia Kaliszek / Michal Kaliszek	346	2012/2013 season (100%)	0	0	0	0	0
78	POL	Natalia Kaliszek / Michal Kaliszek	346	2011/2012 season (100%)	0	0	0	182	164
78	POL	Natalia Kaliszek / Michal Kaliszek	346	2010/2011 season (70%)	0	0	0	0	0
80	MEX	Corenne Bruhns / Ryan Van Natten	325	2012/2013 season (100%)	0	0	0	0	0
80	MEX	Corenne Bruhns / Ryan Van Natten	325	2011/2012 season (100%)	325	0	0	0	0
80	MEX	Corenne Bruhns / Ryan Van Natten	325	2010/2011 season (70%)	0	0	0	0	0
81	RUS	Jana Khokhlova / Fedor Andreev	316	2012/2013 season (100%)	0	0	0	0	0
81	RUS	Jana Khokhlova / Fedor Andreev	316	2011/2012 season (100%)	0	0	0	0	0
81	RUS	Jana Khokhlova / Fedor Andreev	316	2010/2011 season (70%)	0	0	0	158	158
82	USA	Madeline Heritage / Nathaniel Fast	297	2012/2013 season (100%)	0	133	0	0	0
82	USA	Madeline Heritage / Nathaniel Fast	297	2011/2012 season (100%)	0	164	0	0	0
82	USA	Madeline Heritage / Nathaniel Fast	297	2010/2011 season (70%)	0	0	0	0	0
83	KAZ	Cortney Mansour / Daryn Zhunussov	293	2012/2013 season (100%)	0	0	0	0	0
83	KAZ	Cortney Mansour / Daryn Zhunussov	293	2011/2012 season (100%)	293	0	0	0	0
83	KAZ	Cortney Mansour / Daryn Zhunussov	293	2010/2011 season (70%)	0	0	0	0	0
83	JPN	Emi Hirai / Marien De La Asuncion	293	2012/2013 season (100%)	293	0	0	0	0
83	JPN	Emi Hirai / Marien De La Asuncion	293	2011/2012 season (100%)	0	0	0	0	0
83	JPN	Emi Hirai / Marien De La Asuncion	293	2010/2011 season (70%)	0	0	0	0	0
85	CHN	Xueting Guan / Meng Wang	281	2012/2013 season (100%)	0	0	0	0	0
85	CHN	Xueting Guan / Meng Wang	281	2011/2012 season (100%)	0	0	0	0	0
85	CHN	Xueting Guan / Meng Wang	281	2010/2011 season (70%)	281	0	0	0	0
86	RUS	Valeria Loseva / Denis Lunin	275	2012/2013 season (100%)	0	0	0	0	0
86	RUS	Valeria Loseva / Denis Lunin	275	2011/2012 season (100%)	0	182	0	0	0
86	RUS	Valeria Loseva / Denis Lunin	275	2010/2011 season (70%)	0	93	0	0	0
87	RUS	Maria Simonova / Dmitriy Dragun	268	2012/2013 season (100%)	0	120	0	0	0
87	RUS	Maria Simonova / Dmitriy Dragun	268	2011/2012 season (100%)	0	148	0	0	0
87	RUS	Maria Simonova / Dmitriy Dragun	268	2010/2011 season (70%)	0	0	0	0	0
88	JPN	Bryna Oi / Taiyo Mizutani	264	2012/2013 season (100%)	264	0	0	0	0
88	JPN	Bryna Oi / Taiyo Mizutani	264	2011/2012 season (100%)	0	0	0	0	0
88	JPN	Bryna Oi / Taiyo Mizutani	264	2010/2011 season (70%)	0	0	0	0	0
89	CAN	Caelen Dalmer / Shane Firus	256	2012/2013 season (100%)	0	148	0	0	0
89	CAN	Caelen Dalmer / Shane Firus	256	2011/2012 season (100%)	0	108	0	0	0
89	CAN	Caelen Dalmer / Shane Firus	256	2010/2011 season (70%)	0	0	0	0	0
90	MEX	Pilar Maekawa Moreno / Leonardo Maekawa Moreno	237	2012/2013 season (100%)	237	0	0	0	0
90	MEX	Pilar Maekawa Moreno / Leonardo Maekawa Moreno	237	2011/2012 season (100%)	0	0	0	0	0
90	MEX	Pilar Maekawa Moreno / Leonardo Maekawa Moreno	237	2010/2011 season (70%)	0	0	0	0	0
91	EST	Johanna Allik / Paul Michael Bellantuono	217	2012/2013 season (100%)	0	120	97	0	0
91	EST	Johanna Allik / Paul Michael Bellantuono	217	2011/2012 season (100%)	0	0	0	0	0
91	EST	Johanna Allik / Paul Michael Bellantuono	217	2010/2011 season (70%)	0	0	0	0	0
92	ESP	Celia Robledo / Luis Fenero	211	2012/2013 season (100%)	103	108	0	0	0
92	ESP	Celia Robledo / Luis Fenero	211	2011/2012 season (100%)	0	0	0	0	0
92	ESP	Celia Robledo / Luis Fenero	211	2010/2011 season (70%)	0	0	0	0	0
93	AUS	Maria Borounov / Evgeni Borounov	205	2012/2013 season (100%)	0	0	0	0	0
93	AUS	Maria Borounov / Evgeni Borounov	205	2011/2012 season (100%)	0	0	0	0	0
93	AUS	Maria Borounov / Evgeni Borounov	205	2010/2011 season (70%)	205	0	0	0	0
94	ITA	Alessia Busi / Andrea Fabbri	201	2012/2013 season (100%)	93	108	0	0	0
94	ITA	Alessia Busi / Andrea Fabbri	201	2011/2012 season (100%)	0	0	0	0	0
94	ITA	Alessia Busi / Andrea Fabbri	201	2010/2011 season (70%)	0	0	0	0	0
95	USA	Emily Samuelson / Todd Gilles	191	2012/2013 season (100%)	0	0	0	0	0
95	USA	Emily Samuelson / Todd Gilles	191	2011/2012 season (100%)	0	191	0	0	0
95	USA	Emily Samuelson / Todd Gilles	191	2010/2011 season (70%)	0	0	0	0	0
96	FRA	Myriam Gassoumi / Clement Le Molaire	173	2012/2013 season (100%)	0	0	0	0	0
96	FRA	Myriam Gassoumi / Clement Le Molaire	173	2011/2012 season (100%)	0	97	0	0	0
96	FRA	Myriam Gassoumi / Clement Le Molaire	173	2010/2011 season (70%)	0	76	0	0	0
97	GER	Ria Schiffner / Julian Salatzki	172	2012/2013 season (100%)	75	97	0	0	0
97	GER	Ria Schiffner / Julian Salatzki	172	2011/2012 season (100%)	0	0	0	0	0
97	GER	Ria Schiffner / Julian Salatzki	172	2010/2011 season (70%)	0	0	0	0	0
98	KOR	Rebeka Kim / Kirill Minov	165	2012/2013 season (100%)	68	97	0	0	0
98	KOR	Rebeka Kim / Kirill Minov	165	2011/2012 season (100%)	0	0	0	0	0
98	KOR	Rebeka Kim / Kirill Minov	165	2010/2011 season (70%)	0	0	0	0	0
99	POL	Justyna Plutowska / Peter Gerber	164	2012/2013 season (100%)	0	0	0	164	0
99	POL	Justyna Plutowska / Peter Gerber	164	2011/2012 season (100%)	0	0	0	0	0
99	POL	Justyna Plutowska / Peter Gerber	164	2010/2011 season (70%)	0	0	0	0	0
99	BLR	Lesia Volodenkova / Vitali Vakunov	164	2012/2013 season (100%)	0	0	0	164	0
99	BLR	Lesia Volodenkova / Vitali Vakunov	164	2011/2012 season (100%)	0	0	0	0	0
99	BLR	Lesia Volodenkova / Vitali Vakunov	164	2010/2011 season (70%)	0	0	0	0	0
101	GER	Dominique Dieck / Michael Zenkner	156	2012/2013 season (100%)	0	0	0	0	0
101	GER	Dominique Dieck / Michael Zenkner	156	2011/2012 season (100%)	0	0	0	0	0
101	GER	Dominique Dieck / Michael Zenkner	156	2010/2011 season (70%)	72	84	0	0	0
102	CAN	Sarah Arnold / Justin Trojek	149	2012/2013 season (100%)	0	0	0	0	0
102	CAN	Sarah Arnold / Justin Trojek	149	2011/2012 season (100%)	0	0	0	0	0
102	CAN	Sarah Arnold / Justin Trojek	149	2010/2011 season (70%)	0	149	0	0	0
103	CAN	Melinda Meng / Andrew Meng	148	2012/2013 season (100%)	0	148	0	0	0
103	CAN	Melinda Meng / Andrew Meng	148	2011/2012 season (100%)	0	0	0	0	0
103	CAN	Melinda Meng / Andrew Meng	148	2010/2011 season (70%)	0	0	0	0	0
103	UKR	Anastasia Chiriyatyeva / Sergei Shevchenko	148	2012/2013 season (100%)	0	148	0	0	0
103	UKR	Anastasia Chiriyatyeva / Sergei Shevchenko	148	2011/2012 season (100%)	0	0	0	0	0
103	UKR	Anastasia Chiriyatyeva / Sergei Shevchenko	148	2010/2011 season (70%)	0	0	0	0	0
103	USA	Elliana Pogrebinsky / Ross Gudis	148	2012/2013 season (100%)	0	148	0	0	0
103	USA	Elliana Pogrebinsky / Ross Gudis	148	2011/2012 season (100%)	0	0	0	0	0
103	USA	Elliana Pogrebinsky / Ross Gudis	148	2010/2011 season (70%)	0	0	0	0	0
106	HUN	Dora Turoczi / Balazs Major	134	2012/2013 season (100%)	0	0	0	0	0
106	HUN	Dora Turoczi / Balazs Major	134	2011/2012 season (100%)	0	0	0	0	0
106	HUN	Dora Turoczi / Balazs Major	134	2010/2011 season (70%)	0	134	0	0	0
107	CAN	Marieve Cyr / Benjamin Brisebois Gaudreau	133	2012/2013 season (100%)	0	133	0	0	0
107	CAN	Marieve Cyr / Benjamin Brisebois Gaudreau	133	2011/2012 season (100%)	0	0	0	0	0
107	CAN	Marieve Cyr / Benjamin Brisebois Gaudreau	133	2010/2011 season (70%)	0	0	0	0	0
108	FIN	Olesia Karmi / Max Lindholm	126	2012/2013 season (100%)	126	0	0	0	0
108	FIN	Olesia Karmi / Max Lindholm	126	2011/2012 season (100%)	0	0	0	0	0
108	FIN	Olesia Karmi / Max Lindholm	126	2010/2011 season (70%)	0	0	0	0	0
109	CZE	Jana Cejkova / Alexandr Sinicyn	120	2012/2013 season (100%)	0	120	0	0	0
109	CZE	Jana Cejkova / Alexandr Sinicyn	120	2011/2012 season (100%)	0	0	0	0	0
109	CZE	Jana Cejkova / Alexandr Sinicyn	120	2010/2011 season (70%)	0	0	0	0	0
109	USA	Holly Moore / Daniel Klaber	120	2012/2013 season (100%)	0	120	0	0	0
109	USA	Holly Moore / Daniel Klaber	120	2011/2012 season (100%)	0	0	0	0	0
109	USA	Holly Moore / Daniel Klaber	120	2010/2011 season (70%)	0	0	0	0	0
109	UKR	Lolita Yermak / Alexei Khimich	120	2012/2013 season (100%)	0	120	0	0	0
109	UKR	Lolita Yermak / Alexei Khimich	120	2011/2012 season (100%)	0	0	0	0	0
109	UKR	Lolita Yermak / Alexei Khimich	120	2010/2011 season (70%)	0	0	0	0	0
109	RUS	Kristina Baklanova / Andrei Bagin	120	2012/2013 season (100%)	0	120	0	0	0
109	RUS	Kristina Baklanova / Andrei Bagin	120	2011/2012 season (100%)	0	0	0	0	0
109	RUS	Kristina Baklanova / Andrei Bagin	120	2010/2011 season (70%)	0	0	0	0	0
109	SVK	Natalia Jancosek / Petr Seknicka	120	2012/2013 season (100%)	0	0	0	0	0
109	SVK	Natalia Jancosek / Petr Seknicka	120	2011/2012 season (100%)	0	120	0	0	0
109	SVK	Natalia Jancosek / Petr Seknicka	120	2010/2011 season (70%)	0	0	0	0	0
114	GEO	Angelina Telegina / Otar Japaridze	113	2012/2013 season (100%)	113	0	0	0	0
114	GEO	Angelina Telegina / Otar Japaridze	113	2011/2012 season (100%)	0	0	0	0	0
114	GEO	Angelina Telegina / Otar Japaridze	113	2010/2011 season (70%)	0	0	0	0	0
115	USA	Danielle Gamelin / Alexander Gamelin	108	2012/2013 season (100%)	0	0	0	0	0
115	USA	Danielle Gamelin / Alexander Gamelin	108	2011/2012 season (100%)	0	108	0	0	0
115	USA	Danielle Gamelin / Alexander Gamelin	108	2010/2011 season (70%)	0	0	0	0	0
115	NZL	Ayesha Campbell / Shane Speden	108	2012/2013 season (100%)	0	0	0	0	0
115	NZL	Ayesha Campbell / Shane Speden	108	2011/2012 season (100%)	0	108	0	0	0
115	NZL	Ayesha Campbell / Shane Speden	108	2010/2011 season (70%)	0	0	0	0	0
115	GER	Lisa Enderlein / Hendrik Hilpert	108	2012/2013 season (100%)	0	108	0	0	0
115	GER	Lisa Enderlein / Hendrik Hilpert	108	2011/2012 season (100%)	0	0	0	0	0
115	GER	Lisa Enderlein / Hendrik Hilpert	108	2010/2011 season (70%)	0	0	0	0	0
115	FRA	Magalie Leininger / Maxime Caurel	108	2012/2013 season (100%)	0	108	0	0	0
115	FRA	Magalie Leininger / Maxime Caurel	108	2011/2012 season (100%)	0	0	0	0	0
115	FRA	Magalie Leininger / Maxime Caurel	108	2010/2011 season (70%)	0	0	0	0	0
119	USA	Whitney Miller / Kyle Macmillan	97	2012/2013 season (100%)	0	97	0	0	0
119	USA	Whitney Miller / Kyle Macmillan	97	2011/2012 season (100%)	0	0	0	0	0
119	USA	Whitney Miller / Kyle Macmillan	97	2010/2011 season (70%)	0	0	0	0	0
119	FRA	Laura Boutary / Mahil Chantelauze	97	2012/2013 season (100%)	0	0	0	0	0
119	FRA	Laura Boutary / Mahil Chantelauze	97	2011/2012 season (100%)	0	97	0	0	0
119	FRA	Laura Boutary / Mahil Chantelauze	97	2010/2011 season (70%)	0	0	0	0	0
121	GBR	Olivia Smart / Joseph Buckland	93	2012/2013 season (100%)	0	0	0	0	0
121	GBR	Olivia Smart / Joseph Buckland	93	2011/2012 season (100%)	93	0	0	0	0
121	GBR	Olivia Smart / Joseph Buckland	93	2010/2011 season (70%)	0	0	0	0	0
122	CAN	Carolyn Maccuish / Tyler Morris	84	2012/2013 season (100%)	0	0	0	0	0
122	CAN	Carolyn Maccuish / Tyler Morris	84	2011/2012 season (100%)	0	0	0	0	0
122	CAN	Carolyn Maccuish / Tyler Morris	84	2010/2011 season (70%)	0	84	0	0	0
122	USA	Gabrielle Friedenberg / Ben Nykiel	84	2012/2013 season (100%)	0	0	0	0	0
122	USA	Gabrielle Friedenberg / Ben Nykiel	84	2011/2012 season (100%)	0	0	0	0	0
122	USA	Gabrielle Friedenberg / Ben Nykiel	84	2010/2011 season (70%)	0	84	0	0	0
124	ISR	Brooke Elizabeth Frieling / Lionel Rumi	79	2012/2013 season (100%)	0	0	0	0	0
124	ISR	Brooke Elizabeth Frieling / Lionel Rumi	79	2011/2012 season (100%)	0	0	0	0	0
124	ISR	Brooke Elizabeth Frieling / Lionel Rumi	79	2010/2011 season (70%)	79	0	0	0	0
125	CAN	Edrea Khong / Edbert Khong	76	2012/2013 season (100%)	0	0	0	0	0
125	CAN	Edrea Khong / Edbert Khong	76	2011/2012 season (100%)	0	0	0	0	0
125	CAN	Edrea Khong / Edbert Khong	76	2010/2011 season (70%)	0	76	0	0	0

== Season's World Ranking ==
The remainder of this section is a complete list, by discipline, published by the ISU.

=== Men's singles (125 skaters) ===
As of 20 April 2013

Rank	Nation	Skater	Points	Season	ISU Championships or Olympics	(Junior) Grand Prix and Final		Selected International Competition	
Rank	Nation	Skater	Points	Season	Best	Best	2nd Best	Best	2nd Best
1	CAN	Patrick Chan	2248	2012/2013 season (100%)	1200	648	400	0	0
2	JPN	Yuzuru Hanyu	2245	2012/2013 season (100%)	875	720	400	250	0
3	ESP	Javier Fernandez	2158	2012/2013 season (100%)	972	583	400	203	0
4	JPN	Daisuke Takahashi	1869	2012/2013 season (100%)	709	800	360	0	0
5	CZE	Michal Brezina	1629	2012/2013 season (100%)	680	324	236	225	164
6	KAZ	Denis Ten	1566	2012/2013 season (100%)	1080	236	0	250	0
7	CAN	Kevin Reynolds	1520	2012/2013 season (100%)	840	262	236	182	0
8	FRA	Florent Amodio	1372	2012/2013 season (100%)	756	324	292	0	0
9	JPN	Tatsuki Machida	1347	2012/2013 season (100%)	0	472	400	250	225
10	USA	Richard Dornbush	1274	2012/2013 season (100%)	551	262	236	225	0
11	JPN	Takahiko Kozuka	1175	2012/2013 season (100%)	0	525	400	250	0
12	JPN	Takahito Mura	1165	2012/2013 season (100%)	574	400	191	0	0
13	FRA	Brian Joubert	1154	2012/2013 season (100%)	612	292	0	250	0
14	RUS	Maxim Kovtun	1151	2012/2013 season (100%)	551	350	250	0	0
14	USA	Ross Miner	1151	2012/2013 season (100%)	362	324	262	203	0
16	USA	Max Aaron	1113	2012/2013 season (100%)	638	0	0	250	225
17	PHI	Michael Christian Martinez	1111	2012/2013 season (100%)	328	182	148	250	203
18	JPN	Nobunari Oda	1086	2012/2013 season (100%)	0	324	262	250	250
19	CHN	Han Yan	1069	2012/2013 season (100%)	680	225	164	0	0
20	USA	Joshua Farris	1065	2012/2013 season (100%)	500	315	250	0	0
21	RUS	Konstantin Menshov	1059	2012/2013 season (100%)	0	292	292	250	225
22	SWE	Alexander Majorov	996	2012/2013 season (100%)	496	0	0	250	250
23	RUS	Sergei Voronov	983	2012/2013 season (100%)	446	324	213	0	0
24	FRA	Chafik Besseghier	960	2012/2013 season (100%)	362	213	0	203	182
25	USA	Jason Brown	955	2012/2013 season (100%)	450	255	250	0	0
26	GER	Peter Liebers	918	2012/2013 season (100%)	418	0	0	250	250
27	CZE	Tomáš Verner	878	2012/2013 season (100%)	293	191	191	203	0
28	CHN	Boyang Jin	845	2012/2013 season (100%)	365	250	230	0	0
29	USA	Shotaro Omori	769	2012/2013 season (100%)	405	182	182	0	0
30	CHN	Nan Song	758	2012/2013 season (100%)	496	262	0	0	0
31	USA	Adam Rippon	708	2012/2013 season (100%)	0	292	191	225	0
32	JPN	Ryuju Hino	703	2012/2013 season (100%)	194	284	225	0	0
33	UZB	Misha Ge	700	2012/2013 season (100%)	293	0	0	225	182
34	RUS	Mikhail Kolyada	668	2012/2013 season (100%)	295	148	0	225	0
35	RUS	Alexander Samarin	645	2012/2013 season (100%)	239	203	203	0	0
36	USA	Armin Mahbanoozadeh	641	2012/2013 season (100%)	0	213	0	225	203
37	JPN	Shoma Uno	639	2012/2013 season (100%)	266	225	148	0	0
38	USA	Jeremy Abbott	622	2012/2013 season (100%)	0	360	262	0	0
39	BEL	Jorik Hendrickx	612	2012/2013 season (100%)	180	0	0	250	182
40	KAZ	Abzal Rakimgaliev	581	2012/2013 season (100%)	192	0	0	225	164
41	ROU	Zoltán Kelemen	568	2012/2013 season (100%)	140	0	0	225	203
42	ISR	Alexei Bychenko	542	2012/2013 season (100%)	214	0	0	164	164
43	DEN	Justus Strid	534	2012/2013 season (100%)	106	0	0	225	203
44	KOR	Jin Seo Kim	511	2012/2013 season (100%)	126	203	182	0	0
45	SUI	Stephane Walker	498	2012/2013 season (100%)	113	0	0	203	182
46	CHN	Yi Wang	473	2012/2013 season (100%)	237	236	0	0	0
47	CAN	Nam Nguyen	468	2012/2013 season (100%)	157	203	108	0	0
48	MON	Kim Lucine	467	2012/2013 season (100%)	264	0	0	203	0
49	RUS	Artur Gachinski	463	2012/2013 season (100%)	0	213	0	250	0
50	USA	Keegan Messing	453	2012/2013 season (100%)	0	0	0	250	203
50	ITA	Paolo Bacchini	453	2012/2013 season (100%)	0	0	0	250	203
52	CHN	Jinlin Guan	449	2012/2013 season (100%)	0	236	213	0	0
53	GER	Martin Rappe	446	2012/2013 season (100%)	174	164	108	0	0
54	JPN	Keiji Tanaka	432	2012/2013 season (100%)	0	225	207	0	0
55	JPN	Daisuke Murakami	428	2012/2013 season (100%)	0	0	0	225	203
55	KOR	June Hyoung Lee	428	2012/2013 season (100%)	156	164	108	0	0
55	GER	Paul Fentz	428	2012/2013 season (100%)	0	0	0	225	203
55	HKG	Ronald Lam	428	2012/2013 season (100%)	0	0	0	225	203
59	AUT	Viktor Pfeifer	402	2012/2013 season (100%)	402	0	0	0	0
60	RUS	Alexander Petrov	389	2012/2013 season (100%)	0	225	164	0	0
61	USA	Harrison Choate	385	2012/2013 season (100%)	0	203	182	0	0
62	PHI	Christopher Caluza	378	2012/2013 season (100%)	214	0	0	164	0
63	BLR	Pavel Ignatenko	370	2012/2013 season (100%)	237	133	0	0	0
64	GER	Denis Wieczorek	364	2012/2013 season (100%)	0	0	0	182	182
64	FRA	Romain Ponsart	364	2012/2013 season (100%)	0	0	0	182	182
66	EST	Viktor Romanenkov	361	2012/2013 season (100%)	156	108	97	0	0
67	RUS	Zhan Bush	355	2012/2013 season (100%)	0	191	0	164	0
68	CAN	Elladj Balde	353	2012/2013 season (100%)	140	213	0	0	0
69	GBR	David Richardson	346	2012/2013 season (100%)	0	0	0	182	164
70	CAN	Andrei Rogozine	339	2012/2013 season (100%)	339	0	0	0	0
71	POL	Maciej Cieplucha	329	2012/2013 season (100%)	126	0	0	203	0
72	RUS	Andrei Zuber	328	2012/2013 season (100%)	0	164	164	0	0
72	RUS	Artem Borodulin	328	2012/2013 season (100%)	0	0	0	164	164
72	GBR	Harry Mattick	328	2012/2013 season (100%)	0	0	0	164	164
75	CZE	Petr Coufal	315	2012/2013 season (100%)	0	182	133	0	0
76	UKR	Ivan Pavlov	308	2012/2013 season (100%)	68	120	120	0	0
77	CAN	Roman Sadovsky	300	2012/2013 season (100%)	0	203	97	0	0
78	USA	Jay Yostanto	296	2012/2013 season (100%)	0	148	148	0	0
79	JPN	Sei Kawahara	284	2012/2013 season (100%)	0	164	120	0	0
80	RUS	Adian Pitkeev	268	2012/2013 season (100%)	0	148	120	0	0
80	JPN	Shu Nakamura	268	2012/2013 season (100%)	0	148	120	0	0
82	FRA	Charles Tetar	266	2012/2013 season (100%)	0	133	133	0	0
83	USA	Nathan Chen	250	2012/2013 season (100%)	0	250	0	0	0
83	RUS	Vladislav Sesganov	250	2012/2013 season (100%)	0	0	0	250	0
85	JPN	Taichi Honda	230	2012/2013 season (100%)	0	133	97	0	0
86	USA	Alexander Johnson	225	2012/2013 season (100%)	0	0	0	225	0
86	USA	Douglas Razzano	225	2012/2013 season (100%)	0	0	0	225	0
86	JPN	Kento Nakamura	225	2012/2013 season (100%)	0	0	0	225	0
86	RUS	Mark Shakhmatov	225	2012/2013 season (100%)	0	0	0	225	0
86	CZE	Pavel Kaska	225	2012/2013 season (100%)	0	0	0	225	0
91	CAN	Mitchell Gordon	223	2012/2013 season (100%)	103	120	0	0	0
92	ESP	Victor Bustamante	216	2012/2013 season (100%)	83	133	0	0	0
93	CHN	He Zhang	215	2012/2013 season (100%)	215	0	0	0	0
94	GER	Christopher Berneck	203	2012/2013 season (100%)	0	0	0	203	0
94	FIN	Valtter Virtanen	203	2012/2013 season (100%)	0	0	0	203	0
96	UKR	Yakov Godorozha	192	2012/2013 season (100%)	192	0	0	0	0
97	FRA	Simon Hocquaux	190	2012/2013 season (100%)	93	97	0	0	0
98	JPN	Akio Sasaki	182	2012/2013 season (100%)	0	0	0	182	0
98	USA	Brandon Mroz	182	2012/2013 season (100%)	0	0	0	182	0
98	GER	Franz Streubel	182	2012/2013 season (100%)	0	0	0	182	0
98	USA	Johnny Weir	182	2012/2013 season (100%)	0	0	0	182	0
98	SWE	Ondrej Spiegl	182	2012/2013 season (100%)	0	0	0	182	0
98	USA	Stephen Carriere	182	2012/2013 season (100%)	0	0	0	182	0
98	USA	Timothy Dolensky	182	2012/2013 season (100%)	0	0	0	182	0
98	JPN	Yoji Tsuboi	182	2012/2013 season (100%)	0	0	0	182	0
106	AUS	David Kranjec	180	2012/2013 season (100%)	83	97	0	0	0
107	ESP	Javier Raya	173	2012/2013 season (100%)	173	0	0	0	0
108	SWE	Bertil Skeppar	164	2012/2013 season (100%)	0	0	0	164	0
108	RUS	Ivan Bariev	164	2012/2013 season (100%)	0	0	0	164	0
108	TUR	Osman Akgün	164	2012/2013 season (100%)	0	0	0	164	0
108	ITA	Paul Bonifacio Parkinson	164	2012/2013 season (100%)	0	0	0	164	0
112	ITA	Antonio Panfili	163	2012/2013 season (100%)	55	108	0	0	0
113	TPE	Chih-I Tsao	157	2012/2013 season (100%)	49	108	0	0	0
114	RUS	Andrei Lazukin	133	2012/2013 season (100%)	0	133	0	0	0
115	RUS	Vladislav Tarasenko	120	2012/2013 season (100%)	0	120	0	0	0
116	BRA	Luiz Manella	114	2012/2013 season (100%)	114	0	0	0	0
117	KOR	Min-Seok Kim	113	2012/2013 season (100%)	113	0	0	0	0
118	RUS	Feodosiy Efremenkov	108	2012/2013 season (100%)	0	108	0	0	0
119	AUS	Brendan Kerry	102	2012/2013 season (100%)	102	0	0	0	0
120	GBR	Jack Newberry	97	2012/2013 season (100%)	0	97	0	0	0
120	SUI	Nicola Todeschini	97	2012/2013 season (100%)	0	97	0	0	0
122	TPE	Jordan Ju	92	2012/2013 season (100%)	92	0	0	0	0
122	BUL	Manol Atanassov	92	2012/2013 season (100%)	92	0	0	0	0
124	FIN	Matthias Versluis	75	2012/2013 season (100%)	75	0	0	0	0
125	ARM	Slavik Hayrapetyan	61	2012/2013 season (100%)	61	0	0	0	0

=== Ladies' singles (132 skaters) ===
As of 20 April 2013

Rank	Nation	Skater	Points	Season	ISU Championships or Olympics	(Junior) Grand Prix and Final		Selected International Competition	
Rank	Nation	Skater	Points	Season	Best	Best	2nd Best	Best	2nd Best
1	JPN	Mao Asada	2172	2012/2013 season (100%)	972	800	400	0	0
2	USA	Ashley Wagner	1907	2012/2013 season (100%)	787	720	400	0	0
3	JPN	Akiko Suzuki	1764	2012/2013 season (100%)	756	648	360	0	0
4	ITA	Carolina Kostner	1580	2012/2013 season (100%)	1080	0	0	250	250
5	RUS	Adelina Sotnikova	1567	2012/2013 season (100%)	756	324	262	225	0
6	RUS	Elizaveta Tuktamysheva	1565	2012/2013 season (100%)	680	525	360	0	0
7	USA	Gracie Gold	1507	2012/2013 season (100%)	709	360	213	225	0
8	JPN	Kanako Murakami	1491	2012/2013 season (100%)	875	324	292	0	0
9	KOR	Yuna Kim	1450	2012/2013 season (100%)	1200	0	0	250	0
10	USA	Christina Gao	1444	2012/2013 season (100%)	612	472	360	0	0
11	CHN	Zijun Li	1442	2012/2013 season (100%)	638	292	262	250	0
12	ITA	Valentina Marchei	1404	2012/2013 season (100%)	612	292	0	250	250
13	SWE	Viktoria Helgesson	1386	2012/2013 season (100%)	551	191	191	250	203
14	RUS	Yulia Lipnitskaya	1384	2012/2013 season (100%)	450	360	324	250	0
15	FRA	Maé-Bérénice Méité	1323	2012/2013 season (100%)	418	262	236	225	182
16	USA	Agnes Zawadzki	1238	2012/2013 season (100%)	402	324	262	250	0
17	CAN	Kaetlyn Osmond	1224	2012/2013 season (100%)	574	400	0	250	0
18	FIN	Kiira Korpi	1208	2012/2013 season (100%)	0	583	400	225	0
19	SWE	Joshi Helgesson	1115	2012/2013 season (100%)	402	213	0	250	250
20	RUS	Elena Radionova	1100	2012/2013 season (100%)	500	350	250	0	0
21	GER	Nathalie Weinzierl	1042	2012/2013 season (100%)	362	108	97	250	225
22	CAN	Amelie Lacoste	992	2012/2013 season (100%)	362	236	191	203	0
23	RUS	Anna Pogorilaya	939	2012/2013 season (100%)	405	284	250	0	0
24	JPN	Haruka Imai	881	2012/2013 season (100%)	0	262	191	225	203
25	ESP	Sonia Lafuente	860	2012/2013 season (100%)	446	0	0	250	164
26	GBR	Jenna McCorkell	853	2012/2013 season (100%)	162	191	0	250	250
27	EST	Elena Glebova	824	2012/2013 season (100%)	247	213	0	182	182
28	USA	Mirai Nagasu	819	2012/2013 season (100%)	0	324	292	203	0
29	RUS	Alena Leonova	788	2012/2013 season (100%)	339	236	213	0	0
30	SVK	Monika Simancikova	783	2012/2013 season (100%)	222	133	0	225	203
31	UKR	Natalia Popova	779	2012/2013 season (100%)	275	97	0	225	182
32	RUS	Nikol Gosviani	746	2012/2013 season (100%)	496	0	0	250	0
32	JPN	Satoko Miyahara	746	2012/2013 season (100%)	266	250	230	0	0
34	RUS	Kristina Zaseeva	743	2012/2013 season (100%)	0	182	133	225	203
35	AUT	Kerstin Frank	739	2012/2013 season (100%)	264	0	0	250	225
36	USA	Courtney Hicks	735	2012/2013 season (100%)	328	225	182	0	0
37	GEO	Elene Gedevanishvili	712	2012/2013 season (100%)	214	262	236	0	0
38	RUS	Polina Korobeynikova	699	2012/2013 season (100%)	0	236	213	250	0
39	RUS	Ksenia Makarova	674	2012/2013 season (100%)	0	236	213	225	0
40	JPN	Miyabi Oba	632	2012/2013 season (100%)	0	225	182	225	0
41	CHN	Ziquan Zhao	618	2012/2013 season (100%)	114	182	97	225	0
42	CAN	Gabrielle Daleman	607	2012/2013 season (100%)	295	164	148	0	0
43	JPN	Rika Hongo	604	2012/2013 season (100%)	215	225	164	0	0
44	DEN	Anita Madsen	601	2012/2013 season (100%)	173	0	0	225	203
45	AUS	Brooklee Han	587	2012/2013 season (100%)	264	120	0	203	0
46	USA	Samantha Cesario	568	2012/2013 season (100%)	365	203	0	0	0
47	USA	Hannah Miller	540	2012/2013 season (100%)	0	315	225	0	0
48	KOR	So Youn Park	530	2012/2013 season (100%)	157	225	148	0	0
49	CAN	Julianne Séguin	523	2012/2013 season (100%)	293	133	97	0	0
50	FRA	Lenaelle Gilleron-Gorry	521	2012/2013 season (100%)	293	120	108	0	0
51	CAN	Alaine Chartrand	520	2012/2013 season (100%)	239	148	133	0	0
52	USA	Angela Wang	505	2012/2013 season (100%)	0	255	250	0	0
53	GER	Sarah Hecken	500	2012/2013 season (100%)	0	0	0	250	250
54	FRA	Laurine Lecavelier	499	2012/2013 season (100%)	141	108	0	250	0
55	KOR	Hae Jin Kim	489	2012/2013 season (100%)	75	250	164	0	0
56	SWE	Isabelle Olsson	475	2012/2013 season (100%)	0	0	0	250	225
57	USA	Leah Keiser	457	2012/2013 season (100%)	0	250	207	0	0
58	ITA	Roberta Rodeghiero	453	2012/2013 season (100%)	0	0	0	250	203
59	LUX	Fleur Maxwell	438	2012/2013 season (100%)	74	0	0	182	182
60	ITA	Carol Bressanutti	428	2012/2013 season (100%)	0	0	0	225	203
60	SLO	Dasa Grm	428	2012/2013 season (100%)	0	0	0	225	203
60	SVK	Nicole Rajicová	428	2012/2013 season (100%)	0	0	0	225	203
63	EST	Gerli Liinamäe	420	2012/2013 season (100%)	0	148	108	164	0
64	MEX	Reyna Hamui	419	2012/2013 season (100%)	237	0	0	182	0
65	ITA	Francesca Rio	407	2012/2013 season (100%)	0	0	0	225	182
66	CZE	Eliška Brezinová	406	2012/2013 season (100%)	0	0	0	203	203
67	RUS	Evgenia Gerasimova	385	2012/2013 season (100%)	0	203	182	0	0
67	ITA	Giada Russo	385	2012/2013 season (100%)	0	0	0	203	182
67	GER	Sandy Hoffmann	385	2012/2013 season (100%)	0	0	0	203	182
70	NOR	Anne Line Gjersem	371	2012/2013 season (100%)	92	97	0	182	0
71	BRA	Isadora Williams	367	2012/2013 season (100%)	0	0	0	203	164
71	RUS	Uliana Titushkina	367	2012/2013 season (100%)	0	203	164	0	0
73	TUR	Sıla Saygı	362	2012/2013 season (100%)	83	97	0	182	0
74	RUS	Maria Stavitskaia	336	2012/2013 season (100%)	0	203	133	0	0
75	SVK	Alexandra Kunova	328	2012/2013 season (100%)	0	0	0	164	164
75	RUS	Polina Shelepen	328	2012/2013 season (100%)	0	0	0	164	164
77	CHN	Kexin Zhang	325	2012/2013 season (100%)	325	0	0	0	0
78	JPN	Miu Sato	312	2012/2013 season (100%)	0	164	148	0	0
79	BEL	Kaat Van Daele	304	2012/2013 season (100%)	140	0	0	164	0
79	RSA	Lejeanne Marais	304	2012/2013 season (100%)	140	0	0	164	0
81	SUI	Tina Stuerzinger	277	2012/2013 season (100%)	113	0	0	164	0
82	SWE	Josefine Taljegard	274	2012/2013 season (100%)	44	133	97	0	0
83	PHI	Alisson Krystle Perticheto	247	2012/2013 season (100%)	83	0	0	164	0
84	AUT	Sabrina Schulz	231	2012/2013 season (100%)	49	0	0	182	0
85	NOR	Anine Rabe	225	2012/2013 season (100%)	0	0	0	225	0
85	USA	Barbie Long	225	2012/2013 season (100%)	0	225	0	0	0
85	SLO	Nika Ceric	225	2012/2013 season (100%)	0	0	0	225	0
88	AUS	Chantelle Kerry	214	2012/2013 season (100%)	214	0	0	0	0
89	GER	Minami Hanashiro	203	2012/2013 season (100%)	0	0	0	203	0
89	RUS	Polina Agafonova	203	2012/2013 season (100%)	0	0	0	203	0
89	JPN	Risa Shoji	203	2012/2013 season (100%)	0	0	0	203	0
89	ROU	Sabina Mariuta	203	2012/2013 season (100%)	0	0	0	203	0
93	TPE	Crystal Kiang	192	2012/2013 season (100%)	192	0	0	0	0
94	CHN	Ying Zhang	191	2012/2013 season (100%)	0	191	0	0	0
95	FIN	Leena Rissanen	182	2012/2013 season (100%)	0	0	0	182	0
95	NED	Michelle Couwenberg	182	2012/2013 season (100%)	0	0	0	182	0
95	SUI	Myriam Leuenberger	182	2012/2013 season (100%)	0	0	0	182	0
95	SLO	Patricia Glešcic	182	2012/2013 season (100%)	0	0	0	182	0
95	FIN	Rosaliina Kuparinen	182	2012/2013 season (100%)	0	0	0	182	0
95	EST	Svetlana Issakova	182	2012/2013 season (100%)	0	0	0	182	0
95	USA	Vanessa Lam	182	2012/2013 season (100%)	0	182	0	0	0
102	CHN	Xiaowen Guo	175	2012/2013 season (100%)	55	120	0	0	0
103	USA	Yasmin Siraj	174	2012/2013 season (100%)	174	0	0	0	0
104	KOR	Yeon Jun Park	173	2012/2013 season (100%)	173	0	0	0	0
105	UKR	Alina Milevskaia	164	2012/2013 season (100%)	0	0	0	164	0
105	USA	Ashley Cain	164	2012/2013 season (100%)	0	164	0	0	0
105	AUT	Belinda Schönberger	164	2012/2013 season (100%)	0	0	0	164	0
105	NOR	Camilla Gjersem	164	2012/2013 season (100%)	0	0	0	164	0
105	LTU	Inga Janulevičiūtė	164	2012/2013 season (100%)	0	0	0	164	0
105	USA	Kiri Baga	164	2012/2013 season (100%)	0	164	0	0	0
105	FRA	Lena Marrocco	164	2012/2013 season (100%)	0	0	0	164	0
105	ESP	Monica Gimeno	164	2012/2013 season (100%)	0	0	0	164	0
105	SLO	Pina Umek	164	2012/2013 season (100%)	0	0	0	164	0
105	JPN	Satsuki Muramoto	164	2012/2013 season (100%)	0	0	0	164	0
115	FIN	Juulia Turkkila	156	2012/2013 season (100%)	156	0	0	0	0
115	PHI	Melissa Bulanhagui	156	2012/2013 season (100%)	156	0	0	0	0
117	JPN	Hinano Isobe	148	2012/2013 season (100%)	0	148	0	0	0
117	JPN	Yura Matsuda	148	2012/2013 season (100%)	0	148	0	0	0
119	RUS	Anna Shershak	133	2012/2013 season (100%)	0	133	0	0	0
120	FIN	Jenni Saarinen	127	2012/2013 season (100%)	127	0	0	0	0
121	TPE	Melinda Wang	126	2012/2013 season (100%)	126	0	0	0	0
122	CZE	Elizaveta Ukolova	120	2012/2013 season (100%)	0	120	0	0	0
122	KOR	Hwi Choi	120	2012/2013 season (100%)	0	120	0	0	0
122	JPN	Mayako Matsuno	120	2012/2013 season (100%)	0	120	0	0	0
122	JPN	Yuka Nagai	120	2012/2013 season (100%)	0	120	0	0	0
126	IND	Ami Parekh	113	2012/2013 season (100%)	113	0	0	0	0
127	FIN	Eveliina Viljanen	108	2012/2013 season (100%)	0	108	0	0	0
127	CHN	Jialei Wang	108	2012/2013 season (100%)	0	108	0	0	0
127	JPN	Kako Tomotaki	108	2012/2013 season (100%)	0	108	0	0	0
130	UKR	Anna Khnychenkova	93	2012/2013 season (100%)	93	0	0	0	0
131	LAT	Angelina Kuchvalska	68	2012/2013 season (100%)	68	0	0	0	0
132	HUN	Ivett Tóth	61	2012/2013 season (100%)	61	0	0	0	0

=== Pairs (61 couples) ===
As of 20 April 2013

Rank	Nation	Couple	Points	Season	ISU Championships or Olympics	(Junior) Grand Prix and Final		Selected International Competition	
Rank	Nation	Couple	Points	Season	Best	Best	2nd Best	Best	2nd Best
1	RUS	Tatiana Volosozhar / Maxim Trankov	2650	2012/2013 season (100%)	1200	800	400	250	0
2	CAN	Kirsten Moore-Towers / Dylan Moscovitch	2010	2012/2013 season (100%)	875	525	360	250	0
3	CAN	Meagan Duhamel / Eric Radford	1915	2012/2013 season (100%)	972	583	360	0	0
4	CHN	Qing Pang / Jian Tong	1835	2012/2013 season (100%)	787	648	400	0	0
5	RUS	Vera Bazarova / Yuri Larionov	1758	2012/2013 season (100%)	638	720	400	0	0
6	GER	Aliona Savchenko / Robin Szolkowy	1730	2012/2013 season (100%)	1080	400	0	250	0
7	FRA	Vanessa James / Morgan Ciprès	1593	2012/2013 season (100%)	612	292	236	250	203
8	RUS	Yuko Kavaguti / Alexander Smirnov	1581	2012/2013 season (100%)	709	472	400	0	0
9	RUS	Ksenia Stolbova / Fedor Klimov	1557	2012/2013 season (100%)	496	324	262	250	225
10	ITA	Stefania Berton / Ondrej Hotárek	1553	2012/2013 season (100%)	680	324	324	225	0
11	USA	Marissa Castelli / Simon Shnapir	1516	2012/2013 season (100%)	680	324	262	250	0
12	CAN	Paige Lawrence / Rudi Swiegers	1305	2012/2013 season (100%)	496	292	292	225	0
13	FRA	Daria Popova / Bruno Massot	1267	2012/2013 season (100%)	446	262	213	182	164
14	CHN	Cheng Peng / Hao Zhang	1105	2012/2013 season (100%)	551	292	262	0	0
15	USA	Alexa Scimeca / Chris Knierim	1059	2012/2013 season (100%)	517	292	0	250	0
16	RUS	Lina Fedorova / Maxim Miroshkin	1005	2012/2013 season (100%)	405	350	250	0	0
17	ITA	Nicole Della Monica / Matteo Guarise	991	2012/2013 season (100%)	362	213	213	203	0
18	CAN	Margaret Purdy / Michael Marinaro	955	2012/2013 season (100%)	450	255	250	0	0
19	USA	Caydee Denney / John Coughlin	873	2012/2013 season (100%)	0	324	324	225	0
20	CHN	Xiaoyu Yu / Yang Jin	820	2012/2013 season (100%)	365	230	225	0	0
21	GER	Mari Vartmann / Aaron Van Cleave	808	2012/2013 season (100%)	402	0	0	203	203
22	USA	Felicia Zhang / Nathan Bartholomay	794	2012/2013 season (100%)	612	0	0	182	0
23	CAN	Brittany Jones / Ian Beharry	752	2012/2013 season (100%)	295	250	207	0	0
24	RUS	Vasilisa Davankova / Andrei Deputat	722	2012/2013 season (100%)	0	315	225	182	0
25	USA	Haven Denney / Brandon Frazier	682	2012/2013 season (100%)	500	182	0	0	0
25	CHN	Wenting Wang / Yan Zhang	682	2012/2013 season (100%)	446	236	0	0	0
27	USA	Tiffany Vise / Don Baldwin	675	2012/2013 season (100%)	0	236	236	203	0
28	RUS	Evgenia Tarasova / Vladimir Morozov	674	2012/2013 season (100%)	328	164	0	182	0
29	USA	Gretchen Donlan / Andrew Speroff	643	2012/2013 season (100%)	0	236	0	225	182
30	USA	Lindsay Davis / Mark Ladwig	613	2012/2013 season (100%)	0	236	213	164	0
31	GER	Annabelle Prölss / Ruben Blommaert	596	2012/2013 season (100%)	266	182	148	0	0
32	AUT	Stina Martini / Severin Kiefer	583	2012/2013 season (100%)	237	0	0	182	164
33	RUS	Kamilla Gainetdinova / Ivan Bich	554	2012/2013 season (100%)	239	182	133	0	0
34	RUS	Anastasia Martiusheva / Alexei Rogonov	524	2012/2013 season (100%)	0	262	262	0	0
35	USA	Britney Simpson / Matthew Blackmer	522	2012/2013 season (100%)	194	164	164	0	0
36	RUS	Maria Vigalova / Egor Zakroev	509	2012/2013 season (100%)	0	284	225	0	0
37	USA	Jessica Calalang / Zack Sidhu	483	2012/2013 season (100%)	215	148	120	0	0
38	UKR	Julia Lavrentieva / Yuri Rudyk	457	2012/2013 season (100%)	293	0	0	164	0
39	CAN	Hayleigh Bell / Alistair Sylvester	455	2012/2013 season (100%)	174	148	133	0	0
40	BUL	Elizaveta Makarova / Leri Kenchadze	428	2012/2013 season (100%)	264	0	0	164	0
41	ISR	Danielle Montalbano / Evgeni Krasnopolski	416	2012/2013 season (100%)	0	213	0	203	0
42	CHN	Wenjing Sui / Cong Han	377	2012/2013 season (100%)	377	0	0	0	0
43	USA	Madeline Aaron / Max Settlage	336	2012/2013 season (100%)	0	203	133	0	0
44	GBR	Stacey Kemp / David King	325	2012/2013 season (100%)	325	0	0	0	0
45	USA	Jessica Pfund / Aj Reiss	297	2012/2013 season (100%)	0	164	133	0	0
46	POL	Marcelina Lech / Jakub Tyc	296	2012/2013 season (100%)	114	0	0	182	0
47	CHN	Meiyi Li / Bo Jiang	277	2012/2013 season (100%)	157	120	0	0	0
48	CAN	Natasha Purich / Sebastien Arcieri	245	2012/2013 season (100%)	0	148	97	0	0
49	CAN	Shalena Rau / Phelan Simpson	240	2012/2013 season (100%)	0	120	120	0	0
50	RUS	Julia Antipova / Nodari Maisuradze	225	2012/2013 season (100%)	0	0	0	225	0
50	USA	Tarah Kayne / Danny O'Shea	225	2012/2013 season (100%)	0	0	0	225	0
52	BLR	Maria Paliakova / Nikita Bochkov	214	2012/2013 season (100%)	214	0	0	0	0
53	CAN	Krystel Desjardins / Charlie Bilodeau	205	2012/2013 season (100%)	0	108	97	0	0
53	GER	Vanessa Bauer / Nolan Seegert	205	2012/2013 season (100%)	0	108	97	0	0
55	POL	Magdalena Klatka / Radoslaw Chruscinski	192	2012/2013 season (100%)	192	0	0	0	0
56	USA	Deedee Leng / Timothy Leduc	164	2012/2013 season (100%)	0	0	0	164	0
57	ITA	Giulia Foresti / Leo Luca Sforza	141	2012/2013 season (100%)	141	0	0	0	0
58	RUS	Ekaterina Kuklina / Maxim Petukhov	108	2012/2013 season (100%)	0	108	0	0	0
58	RUS	Tatiana Tudvaseva / Sergei Lisiev	108	2012/2013 season (100%)	0	108	0	0	0
60	NED	Rachel Epstein / Dmitry Epstein	103	2012/2013 season (100%)	103	0	0	0	0
61	PRK	Kyong Mi Kang / Ju Sik Kim	97	2012/2013 season (100%)	0	97	0	0	0

=== Ice dance (99 couples) ===
As of 20 April 2013

Rank	Nation	Couple	Points	Season	ISU Championships or Olympics	(Junior) Grand Prix and Final		Selected International Competition	
Rank	Nation	Couple	Points	Season	Best	Best	2nd Best	Best	2nd Best
1	USA	Meryl Davis / Charlie White	2400	2012/2013 season (100%)	1200	800	400	0	0
2	CAN	Tessa Virtue / Scott Moir	2200	2012/2013 season (100%)	1080	720	400	0	0
3	RUS	Ekaterina Bobrova / Dmitri Soloviev	2107	2012/2013 season (100%)	972	525	360	250	0
4	ITA	Anna Cappellini / Luca Lanotte	2043	2012/2013 season (100%)	875	583	360	225	0
5	RUS	Elena Ilinykh / Nikita Katsalapov	1838	2012/2013 season (100%)	756	472	360	250	0
6	FRA	Nathalie Péchalat / Fabian Bourzat	1757	2012/2013 season (100%)	709	648	400	0	0
7	CAN	Kaitlyn Weaver / Andrew Poje	1685	2012/2013 season (100%)	787	324	324	250	0
8	RUS	Ekaterina Riazanova / Ilia Tkachenko	1510	2012/2013 season (100%)	612	324	324	250	0
9	GER	Nelli Zhiganshina / Alexander Gazsi	1473	2012/2013 season (100%)	496	262	262	250	203
10	USA	Madison Chock / Evan Bates	1404	2012/2013 season (100%)	680	292	0	250	182
11	AZE	Julia Zlobina / Alexei Sitnikov	1394	2012/2013 season (100%)	446	262	236	225	225
12	CAN	Piper Gilles / Paul Poirier	1329	2012/2013 season (100%)	551	292	236	250	0
13	GBR	Penny Coomes / Nicholas Buckland	1250	2012/2013 season (100%)	551	236	213	250	0
14	USA	Maia Shibutani / Alex Shibutani	1228	2012/2013 season (100%)	612	324	292	0	0
15	JPN	Cathy Reed / Chris Reed	1158	2012/2013 season (100%)	446	262	0	225	225
16	RUS	Alexandra Stepanova / Ivan Bukin	1100	2012/2013 season (100%)	500	350	250	0	0
17	ITA	Charlene Guignard / Marco Fabbri	1077	2012/2013 season (100%)	362	262	0	250	203
18	FRA	Pernelle Carron / Lloyd Jones	1031	2012/2013 season (100%)	377	213	191	250	0
19	FRA	Gabriella Papadakis / Guillaume Cizeron	1015	2012/2013 season (100%)	450	315	250	0	0
20	CAN	Nicole Orford / Thomas Williams	979	2012/2013 season (100%)	496	292	191	0	0
21	USA	Alexandra Aldridge / Daniel Eaton	939	2012/2013 season (100%)	405	284	250	0	0
22	RUS	Valeria Zenkova / Valerie Sinitsin	845	2012/2013 season (100%)	365	250	230	0	0
23	RUS	Victoria Sinitsina / Ruslan Zhiganshin	810	2012/2013 season (100%)	0	324	236	250	0
24	UZB	Anna Nagornyuk / Viktor Kovalenko	809	2012/2013 season (100%)	325	182	120	182	0
25	AUS	Danielle O'Brien / Gregory Merriman	787	2012/2013 season (100%)	402	0	0	203	182
25	GER	Tanja Kolbe / Stefano Caruso	787	2012/2013 season (100%)	402	0	0	203	182
27	UKR	Siobhan Heekin-Canedy / Dmitri Dun	780	2012/2013 season (100%)	305	0	0	250	225
28	USA	Madison Hubbell / Zachary Donohue	757	2012/2013 season (100%)	0	292	262	203	0
29	RUS	Evgenia Kosigina / Nikolai Moroshkin	745	2012/2013 season (100%)	295	225	225	0	0
29	USA	Lynn Kriengkrairut / Logan Giulietti-Schmitt	745	2012/2013 season (100%)	0	292	0	250	203
31	CHN	Xiaoyang Yu / Chen Wang	744	2012/2013 season (100%)	362	191	191	0	0
32	EST	Irina Shtork / Taavi Rand	721	2012/2013 season (100%)	293	0	0	225	203
33	CAN	Mackenzie Bent / Garrett MacKeen	713	2012/2013 season (100%)	328	203	182	0	0
34	LTU	Isabella Tobias / Deividas Stagniūnas	682	2012/2013 season (100%)	275	0	0	225	182
35	RUS	Ksenia Monko / Kirill Khaliavin	668	2012/2013 season (100%)	0	236	0	250	182
36	ITA	Lorenza Alessandrini / Simone Vaturi	664	2012/2013 season (100%)	0	236	0	225	203
37	USA	Kaitlin Hawayek / Jean-Luc Baker	655	2012/2013 season (100%)	266	225	164	0	0
38	GER	Shari Koch / Christian Nüchtern	646	2012/2013 season (100%)	239	225	182	0	0
39	CZE	Lucie Myslivecková / Neil Brown	642	2012/2013 season (100%)	214	0	0	225	203
40	RUS	Ekaterina Pushkash / Jonathan Guerreiro	602	2012/2013 season (100%)	0	213	0	225	164
41	TUR	Alisa Agafonova / Alper Uçar	583	2012/2013 season (100%)	237	0	0	182	164
42	CAN	Madeline Edwards / Zhao Kai Pang	563	2012/2013 season (100%)	157	203	203	0	0
43	USA	Lorraine McNamara / Quinn Carpenter	545	2012/2013 season (100%)	215	182	148	0	0
44	HUN	Zsuzsanna Nagy / Mate Fejes	540	2012/2013 season (100%)	173	0	0	203	164
45	UKR	Alexandra Nazarova / Maxim Nikitin	502	2012/2013 season (100%)	174	164	164	0	0
45	SVK	Federica Testa / Lukáš Csölley	502	2012/2013 season (100%)	156	0	0	182	164
47	RUS	Anna Yanovskaya / Sergey Mozgov	480	2012/2013 season (100%)	0	255	225	0	0
48	RUS	Valeria Starygina / Ivan Volobuiev	428	2012/2013 season (100%)	0	0	0	225	203
49	CHN	Xintong Huang / Xun Zheng	426	2012/2013 season (100%)	0	213	213	0	0
50	ESP	Sara Hurtado / Adria Diaz	417	2012/2013 season (100%)	192	0	0	225	0
51	CAN	Andreanne Poulin / Marc-Andre Servant	406	2012/2013 season (100%)	0	203	203	0	0
52	TUR	Cagla Demirsal / Berk Akalin	399	2012/2013 season (100%)	127	164	108	0	0
53	CAN	Alexandra Paul / Mitchell Islam	389	2012/2013 season (100%)	0	0	0	225	164
54	RUS	Daria Morozova / Mikhail Zhirnov	385	2012/2013 season (100%)	0	203	182	0	0
55	GBR	Charlotte Aiken / Josh Whidborne	367	2012/2013 season (100%)	0	0	0	203	164
56	ITA	Federica Bernardi / Christopher Mior	364	2012/2013 season (100%)	0	0	0	182	182
57	USA	Rachel Parsons / Michael Parsons	351	2012/2013 season (100%)	0	203	148	0	0
58	UKR	Daria Korotitskaia / Maksim Spodirev	346	2012/2013 season (100%)	0	182	164	0	0
58	CAN	Noa Bruser / Timothy Lum	346	2012/2013 season (100%)	0	182	164	0	0
60	SUI	Ramona Elsener / Florian Roost	343	2012/2013 season (100%)	140	0	0	203	0
61	FRA	Estelle Elizabeth / Romain Le Gac	308	2012/2013 season (100%)	114	97	97	0	0
62	RUS	Sofia Evdokimova / Egor Bazin	297	2012/2013 season (100%)	0	164	133	0	0
63	JPN	Emi Hirai / Marien De La Asuncion	293	2012/2013 season (100%)	293	0	0	0	0
64	ITA	Sofia Sforza / Francesco Fioretti	289	2012/2013 season (100%)	141	148	0	0	0
65	CZE	Karolina Prochazkova / Michal Ceska	266	2012/2013 season (100%)	0	133	133	0	0
66	JPN	Bryna Oi / Taiyo Mizutani	264	2012/2013 season (100%)	264	0	0	0	0
67	MEX	Pilar Maekawa Moreno / Leonardo Maekawa Moreno	237	2012/2013 season (100%)	237	0	0	0	0
68	KAZ	Karina Uzurova / Ilias Ali	230	2012/2013 season (100%)	0	133	97	0	0
69	EST	Johanna Allik / Paul Michael Bellantuono	217	2012/2013 season (100%)	0	120	97	0	0
70	USA	Anastasia Cannuscio / Colin McManus	213	2012/2013 season (100%)	0	213	0	0	0
71	ESP	Celia Robledo / Luis Fenero	211	2012/2013 season (100%)	103	108	0	0	0
72	ITA	Alessia Busi / Andrea Fabbri	201	2012/2013 season (100%)	93	108	0	0	0
73	CAN	Kharis Ralph / Asher Hill	191	2012/2013 season (100%)	0	191	0	0	0
74	RUS	Kristina Gorshkova / Vitali Butikov	182	2012/2013 season (100%)	0	0	0	182	0
75	GER	Ria Schiffner / Julian Salatzki	172	2012/2013 season (100%)	75	97	0	0	0
76	KOR	Rebeka Kim / Kirill Minov	165	2012/2013 season (100%)	68	97	0	0	0
77	AUT	Barbora Silná / Juri Kurakin	164	2012/2013 season (100%)	0	0	0	164	0
77	POL	Justyna Plutowska / Peter Gerber	164	2012/2013 season (100%)	0	0	0	164	0
77	BLR	Lesia Volodenkova / Vitali Vakunov	164	2012/2013 season (100%)	0	0	0	164	0
80	UKR	Anastasia Chiriyatyeva / Sergei Shevchenko	148	2012/2013 season (100%)	0	148	0	0	0
80	CAN	Caelen Dalmer / Shane Firus	148	2012/2013 season (100%)	0	148	0	0	0
80	USA	Elliana Pogrebinsky / Ross Gudis	148	2012/2013 season (100%)	0	148	0	0	0
80	CAN	Melinda Meng / Andrew Meng	148	2012/2013 season (100%)	0	148	0	0	0
84	USA	Madeline Heritage / Nathaniel Fast	133	2012/2013 season (100%)	0	133	0	0	0
84	CAN	Marieve Cyr / Benjamin Brisebois Gaudreau	133	2012/2013 season (100%)	0	133	0	0	0
84	CAN	Victoria Hasegawa / Connor Hasegawa	133	2012/2013 season (100%)	0	133	0	0	0
87	FIN	Olesia Karmi / Max Lindholm	126	2012/2013 season (100%)	126	0	0	0	0
88	USA	Holly Moore / Daniel Klaber	120	2012/2013 season (100%)	0	120	0	0	0
88	CZE	Jana Cejkova / Alexandr Sinicyn	120	2012/2013 season (100%)	0	120	0	0	0
88	RUS	Kristina Baklanova / Andrei Bagin	120	2012/2013 season (100%)	0	120	0	0	0
88	UKR	Lolita Yermak / Alexei Khimich	120	2012/2013 season (100%)	0	120	0	0	0
88	RUS	Maria Simonova / Dmitriy Dragun	120	2012/2013 season (100%)	0	120	0	0	0
93	GEO	Angelina Telegina / Otar Japaridze	113	2012/2013 season (100%)	113	0	0	0	0
94	GER	Lisa Enderlein / Hendrik Hilpert	108	2012/2013 season (100%)	0	108	0	0	0
94	FRA	Magalie Leininger / Maxime Caurel	108	2012/2013 season (100%)	0	108	0	0	0
94	FIN	Sara Aghai / Jussiville Partanen	108	2012/2013 season (100%)	0	108	0	0	0
94	BLR	Viktoria Kavaliova / Yurii Bieliaiev	108	2012/2013 season (100%)	0	108	0	0	0
98	USA	Whitney Miller / Kyle Macmillan	97	2012/2013 season (100%)	0	97	0	0	0
99	CHN	Yiyi Zhang / Nan Wu	83	2012/2013 season (100%)	83	0	0	0	0

== World standings for synchronized skating ==
Senior Synchronized (45 Teams)

Junior Synchronized (60 Teams)

== See also ==
- ISU World Standings
- ISU Season's World Ranking
- 2012–13 figure skating season
- 2012–13 synchronized skating season
