= Deniss Vasiļjevs =

Latvian figure skater (born 1999)

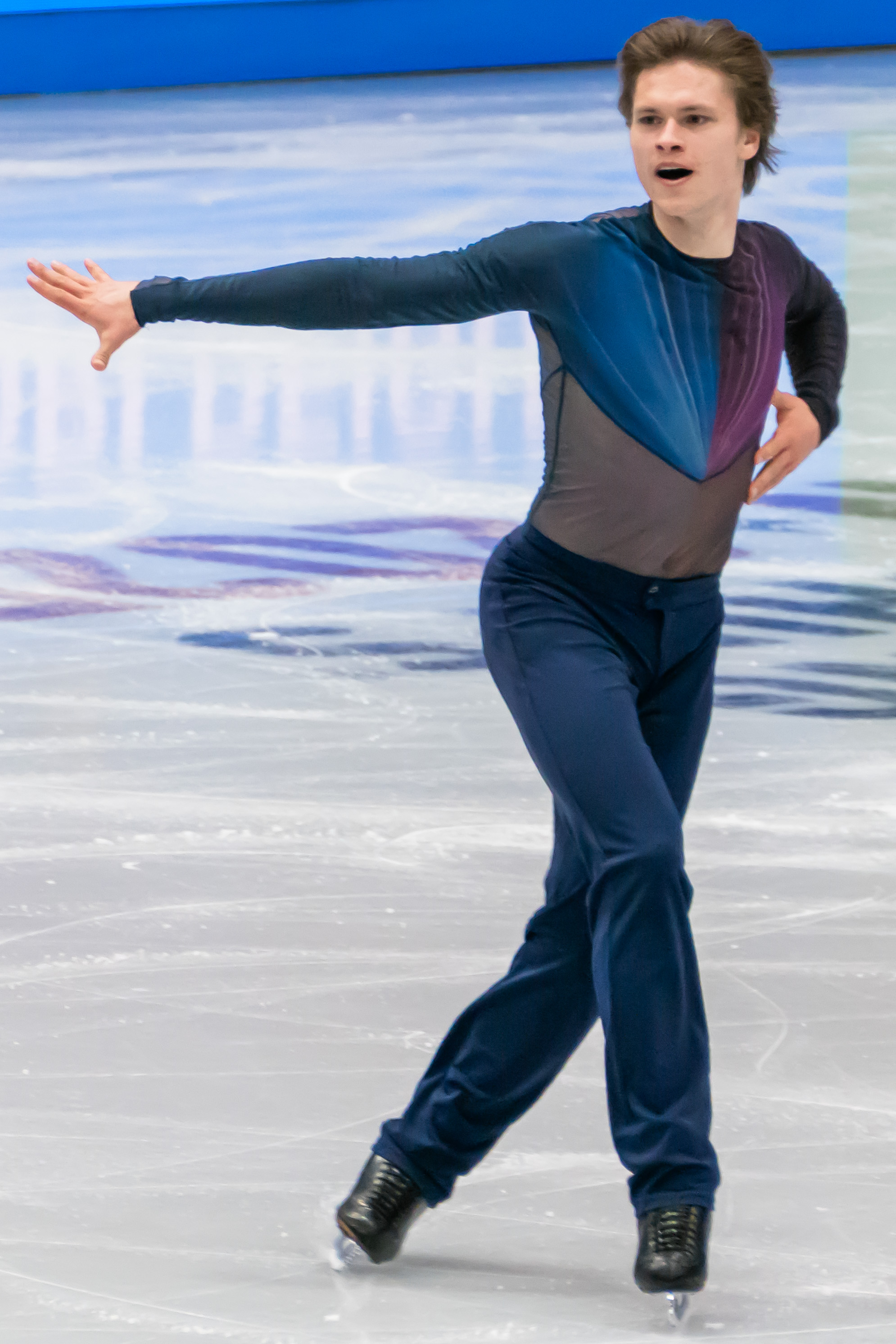
- Deniss Vasiljevs at the 2025 World Championships

Personal information
- Born: 9 August 1999 (age 27) Daugavpils, Latvia
- Height: 1.76 m (5 ft 9 in)

Figure skating career
- Country: Latvia
- Discipline: Men's singles
- Coach: Stéphane Lambiel; Angelo Dolfini
- Skating club: Daugavpils Skating Club
- Began skating: 2003
- Highest WS: 10th

Medal record
European Championships
Bronze medal – third place	2022 Tallinn	Singles
Latvian Championships
Gold medal – first place	2016 Riga	Singles
Gold medal – first place	2017 Ventspils	Singles
Gold medal – first place	2018 Mārupe	Singles
Gold medal – first place	2020 Mārupe	Singles
Gold medal – first place	2023 Riga	Singles
Gold medal – first place	2024 Riga	Singles
Gold medal – first place	2025 Riga	Singles
Winter Youth Olympics
Silver medal – second place	2016 Hamar	Singles
Bronze medal – third place	2016 Hamar	Team

Deniss Vasiļjevs (born 9 August 1999) is a Latvian figure skater. He is the 2022 European bronze medalist, the 2022 MK John Wilson Trophy silver medalist, a five-time ISU Challenger Series medalist (including gold at the 2020 Nebelhorn Trophy), and a seven-time Latvian national champion (2016–18, 2020, 2022–24).

At the junior level, Vasiļjevs is the 2016 Youth Olympics silver medalist, 2015 European Youth Olympic Festival silver medalist, a two-time ISU Junior Grand Prix (JGP) silver medalist, and a two-time Latvian junior national champion (2014-15). He is the first Latvian skater to podium at a JGP event and at an ISU Championships event.

Vasiļjevs represented Latvia at the 2018, 2022, and 2026 Winter Olympics.

== Personal life ==
Vasiļjevs was born on 9 August 1999 in Daugavpils, Latvia to parents, Regina and Sergej. Regina is a former dancer and Sergejs is an electrical engineer. In 2016, Vasiļjevs began living in Champery, Switzerland, but remained a student at Daugavpils Russian Secondary School – Lyceum. He enjoys drawing and speaks four languages – Latvian, Russian, French and English.

Vasiļjevs also helped coach young skaters at the Skating School of Switzerland. After earning a bachelor's degree in Sports and Social Sciences Teacher program at the University of Daugavpils, he went on to earn a master's degree in Leadership and Management. Vasiļjevs wrote his thesis on the topic of "Effective Leadership in Latvian Skating."

His figure skating role models include Stéphane Lambiel, Daisuke Takahashi, Patrick Chan, and Javier Fernández.

== Career ==
Vasiļjevs began skating in 2002. As he was often sick, his parents decided to involve him in a sport, first considering swimming and then skating. In addition, he also began taking ballet classes around that time. Due to there being no permanent figure skating coaches in his hometown of Daugavpils, Vasiļjevs would primarily work with specialists that would make the trip to his skating rink from Riga as well as attend training camps outside of Latvia when possible. Around 2010, Vasiļjevs' parents arranged for him to live with and train under the guidance of Lithuanian coach Ingrida Snieškienė in Paris, France. Due to his schooling, he spent part of the year training in Daugavpils.

=== 2013–14 season: Junior international debut ===
Vasiļjevs debuted on the ISU Junior Grand Prix circuit in 2013, placing seventh in Riga, Latvia and tenth in Gdańsk, Poland. He was named in Latvia's team to the World Junior Championships, held in March 2014 in Sofia, Bulgaria. Ranked eleventh in the short program, he qualified for the free skate, where he placed seventh, pulling him up to eighth overall.

=== 2014–15 season ===
During the 2014–15 figure skating season, Vasiļjevs placed fourth at both of his Junior Grand Prix assignments, in Courchevel, France and Tallinn, Estonia. He won the silver medal at the European Youth Olympic Winter Festival, held in January 2015 in Dornbirn, Austria. He began working with Alexei Urmanov before the 2015 World Junior Championships, which took place in March in Tallinn, Estonia. He placed eighth in both segments and seventh overall.

=== 2015–16 season: Senior international debut; Winter Youth Olympics silver ===
Vasiļjevs began the 2015–16 season by winning silver at both of his JGP events in Riga, Latvia and Toruń, Poland. He is the first Latvian skater to step on a JGP podium. Making his senior international debut, he placed fifth at the 2015 Mordovian Ornament before taking the bronze medal at the 2015 Tallinn Trophy.

In January 2016, Vasiļjevs was sent to his first senior ISU Championship – the 2016 Europeans in Bratislava, Slovakia. He finished twelfth after placing fourteenth in the short program and tenth in the free skate. In February, he competed in Hamar, Norway at the 2016 Youth Olympics. Ranked third in the short program and first in the free skate, he finished second overall with a total score 1.09 less than gold medalist Sōta Yamamoto of Japan. His silver is Latvia's first Youth Olympic medal in figure skating. Vasiļjevs was assigned to compete in the mixed NOC team event as a member of Team Discovery. Placing first in his segment, he lifted his team to the bronze medal.

By 2016, Vasiļjevs was training almost full-time with Urmanov in Sochi, Russia. In March, at the 2016 World Junior Championships in Debrecen, Hungary, he won a small bronze medal for the short program and finished eighth overall. Later that month, he competed at the 2016 World Championships in Boston. He qualified for the free skate by placing tenth in the short program and finishing fourteenth overall.

=== 2016–17 season: Grand Prix debut ===
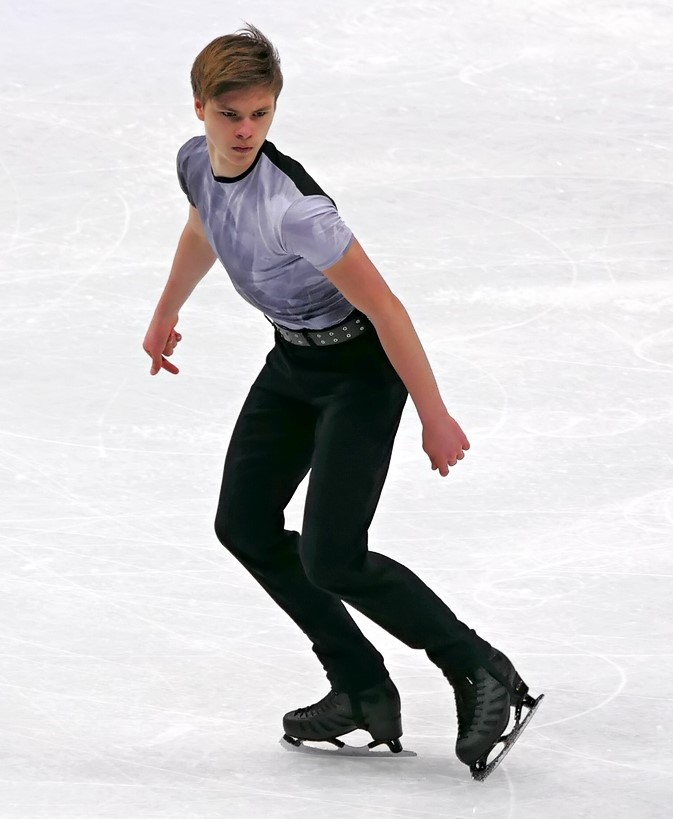
Vasiljevs at the 2017 World Championships

In spring 2016, Vasiļjevs had new programs choreographed by Stéphane Lambiel in Champéry, Switzerland. He was diagnosed with a tear in his left adductor muscle during the off-season and visited Toronto in late July 2016 for physiotherapy. On 25 August 2016, he announced that Lambiel had agreed to coach him in Champéry. He started practicing double jumps in early September. He also worked on developing his program details, steps, and spins.

In November, Vasiljevs made his Grand Prix debut. He placed 11th at the 2016 Rostelecom Cup and then 6th at the 2016 NHK Trophy. He ranked 6th in both segments and 7th overall at the 2017 European Championships in Ostrava, Czech Republic. In March, he won his first international senior gold medal at the 2017 Cup of Tyrol. He finished 14th at the 2017 World Championships in Helsinki, Finland. Due to his result, Latvia qualified a spot in the men's event at the 2018 Winter Olympics in Pyeongchang, South Korea.

=== 2017–18 season: Pyeongchang Olympics ===
Vasiļjevs began his season in September, finishing 4th at Lombardia Trophy. He finished in 8th place at Rostelecom Cup. In November, he was ninth in the short program at NHK Trophy but placed fifth in the free skate and climbed to 6th overall. He went on to win gold at Cup of Tyrol for the second time.

In December, Vasiļjevs won his third national title, and along with Diāna Ņikitina, was subsequently selected to represent Latvia in figure skating at the 2018 Winter Olympics. At the 2018 European Championships in January, he placed third in the short program and earned a small bronze medal. He was fifth in the free skating after falling on a downgraded quad toe loop and finished fourth, matching the record finishes of Angelīna Kučvaļska and Konstantīns Kostins at previous European Championships.

At the 2018 Winter Olympics, Vasiļjevs was twenty-first after the short program after falling on a triple Axel. In the free skating, he fell again on a triple Axel and another element, but was able to move up to nineteenth place. In March, Vasiļjevs competed at the World Championships, where he skated a clean short program and placed ninth. In the free skate, he set a new personal best and national record to finish sixth overall. His sixth-place finish is the highest ever placement by any skater representing Latvia in any discipline at Worlds.

=== 2018–19 season ===
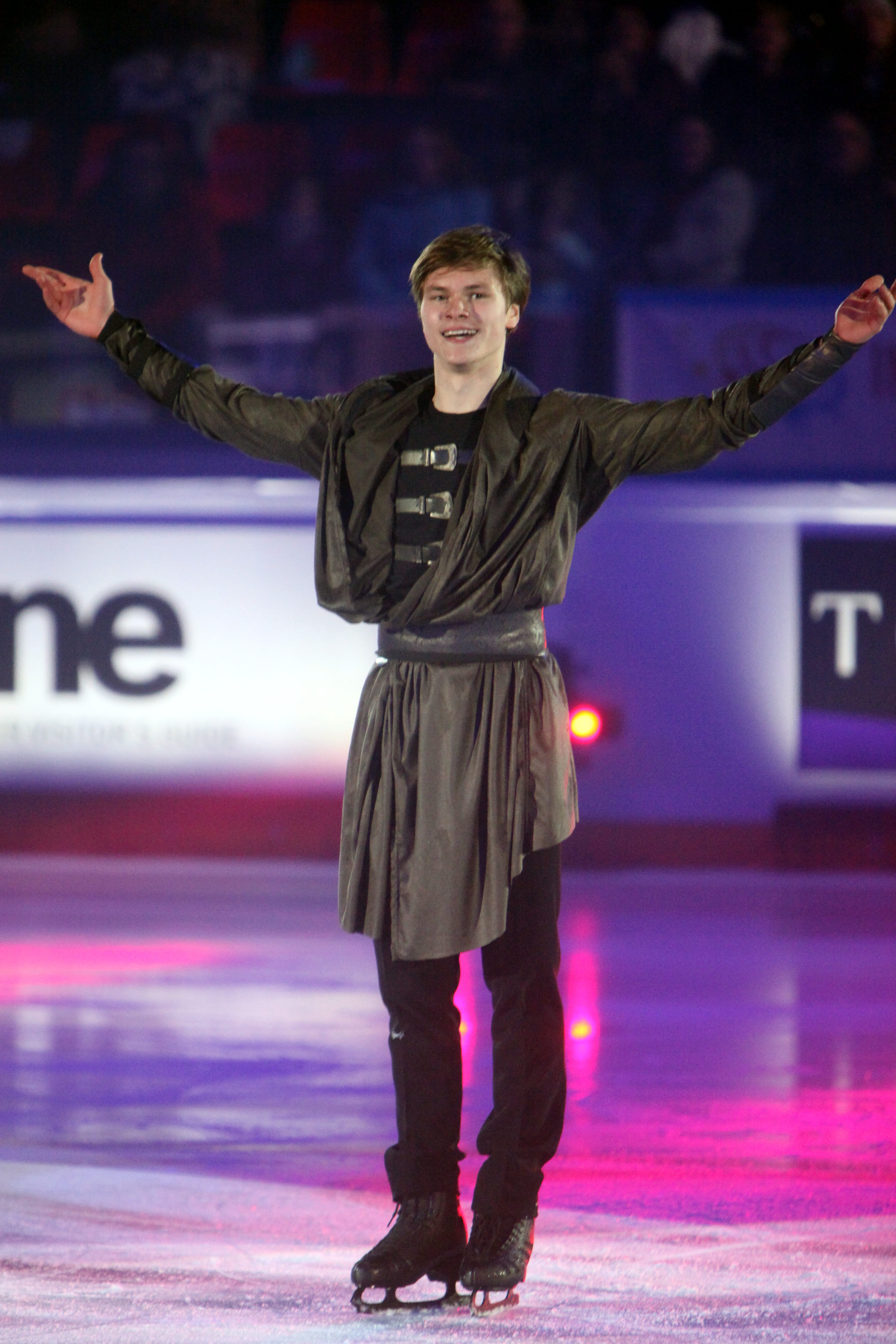
Vasiļjevs at the 2018 Internationaux de France

In October, Vasiljevs competed at Japan Open, placing fifth in his segment but winning silver as part of team Europe. He placed eighth at NHK Trophy and seventh at the Internationaux de France. He was scheduled to compete at Golden Spin in December but withdrew due to illness.

Vasiljevs placed eleventh at the 2019 European Championships and twenty-first at the 2019 World Championships.

=== 2019–20 season ===
To begin the season, Vasiljevs won the bronze medal at the 2019 CS Ondrej Nepela Memorial, the second Challenger medal of his career. He began on the Grand Prix at the 2019 Skate Canada International, placing fourth in the short program after putting a foot down on his triple Lutz. He came seventh in the free skate, dropping to fifth place overall. He was sixth at the 2019 Rostelecom Cup.

Next competing at the 2020 European Championships, Vasiljevs placed fifth in the short program despite still having a twisted ankle. He was seventh in the free skate with a few underrotated jumps and slipped to sixth place overall. He then won a gold medal at the Nordic Championships, which proved to be his final competition of the season, as the 2020 World Championships were cancelled as a result of the coronavirus pandemic.

=== 2020–21 season ===
Vasiljevs began the season at the 2020 CS Nebelhorn Trophy, which, due to pandemic-related travel restrictions, was attended only by skaters from and training in Europe; Vasiljevs was considered one of the pre-event favourites. Only fifth in the short program, he won the free skate and the gold medal, in the process landing a quad Salchow for the first time. Vasiljevs was also assigned to compete at the 2020 Internationaux de France, but this event was also cancelled as a result of the pandemic.

Vasiljevs placed eighteenth at the 2021 World Championships in Stockholm. This result qualified one men's berth for Latvia at the 2022 Winter Olympics in Beijing.

=== 2021–22 season: European bronze, Beijing Olympics ===
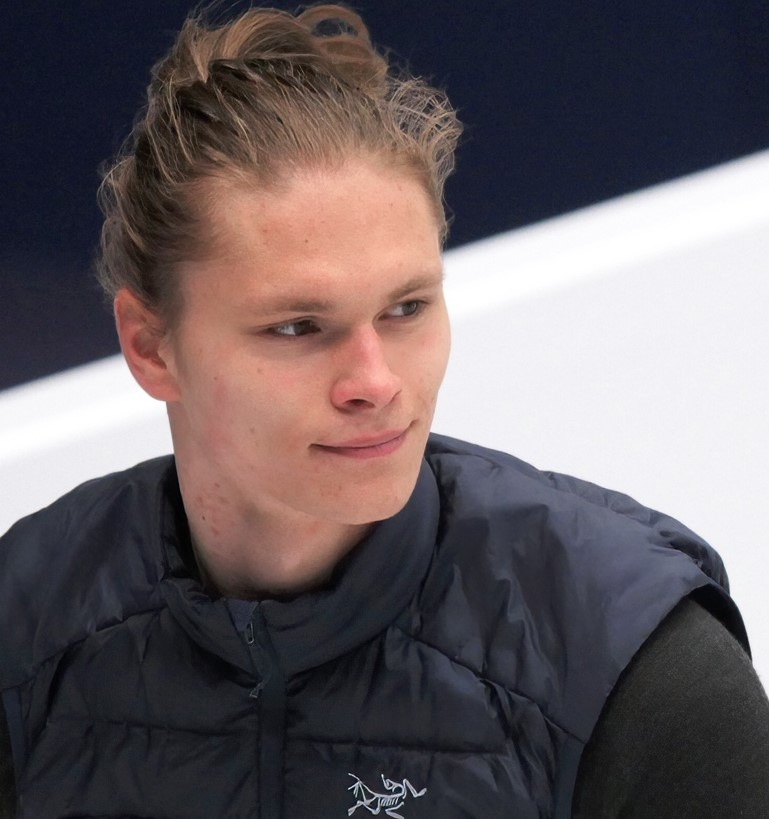
Vasiljevs during practice at the 2022 World Championships

Vasiljevs began the season at the Olympic test event, the 2021 Asian Open, where he placed fourth. His first Grand Prix event was scheduled to be the 2021 Cup of China, but following its cancellation, he was reassigned to the 2021 Gran Premio d'Italia in Turin. He was fourth at that event as well with new person bests in the free skate and total score, and praised the "overwhelming feeling" of competing for an audience again. At his second event, the 2021 Internationaux de France, Vasiljevs was second in the short program with a new personal best score. Seventh in the free skate after errors on both his quad Salchow attempt and one of his triple Axels, he again finished fourth overall while still setting new personal bests again.

At the 2022 European Championships, Vasiljevs placed sixth after the short program, skating cleanly. In the free skate, Vasiljevs landed a quad Salchow and skated the rest of his program cleanly to rise to bronze medal position in the free skate and overall, making the podium for the first time at Europeans. He improved his personal best scores in all segments at the event, and his medal marked the first medal for Latvia at the European Championships in any discipline. He called it "a milestone in my journey that I don’t know where it leads."

Named to his second Latvian team for the 2022 Winter Olympics, Vasiljevs placed sixteenth in the short program of the men's event. Twelfth in the free skate, despite a fall on his quad attempt, Vasiljevs rose to thirteenth place overall. He was thirteenth as well at the 2022 World Championships.

=== 2022–23 season: First Grand Prix medal ===
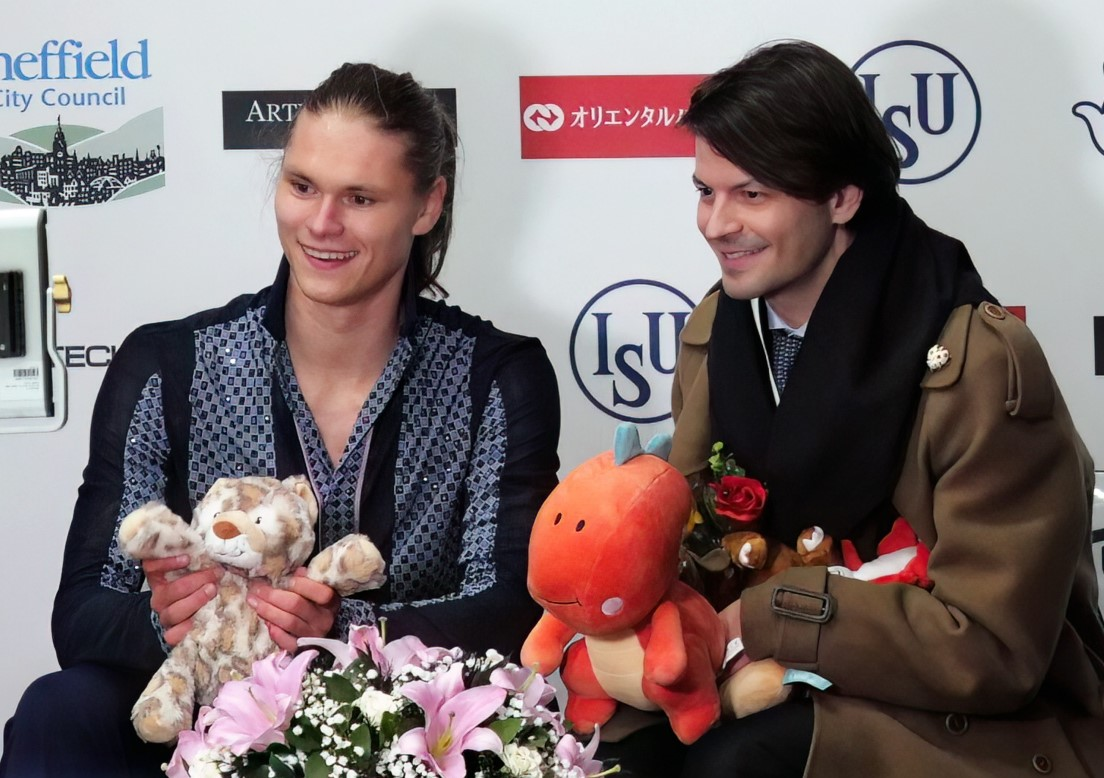
Vasiljevs with longtime coach, Stéphane Lambiel, at the 2022 MK John Wilson Trophy

Vasiljevs worked extensively with choreographer Salome Brunner on his short program to Sting's "Englishman in New York", saying, "I never before put that much of myself into a program." He won the bronze medal at the 2022 CS Nepela Memorial to start the season before finishing tenth at the 2022 Skate Canada International. Vasiljevs rallied from this disappointing result and won the silver medal at his second Grand Prix, the 2022 MK John Wilson Trophy. This was the first Grand Prix medal of his career and the first for a Latvian skater. Speaking on the subject, he said he was "very happy today that I had the first Latvian Grand Prix medal, but that's not the focus that I feel the most satisfied. It's a feeling, the standing ovation, the people cheering, the clapping...this energy is something way above, something way beyond what you get just by achieving something."

Seeking to defend his podium place at the 2023 European Championships, Vasiljevs finished third in the short program despite underrotating part of his jump combination, winning a small bronze medal. He said that in his own mind "I wasn't defending anything. I was skating for my own joy." The free skate proved more difficult, making an error on his quad attempt and underrotating two other triple jumps, dropping him to fifth overall. Vasiljevs came thirteenth at the World Championships for a second consecutive year.

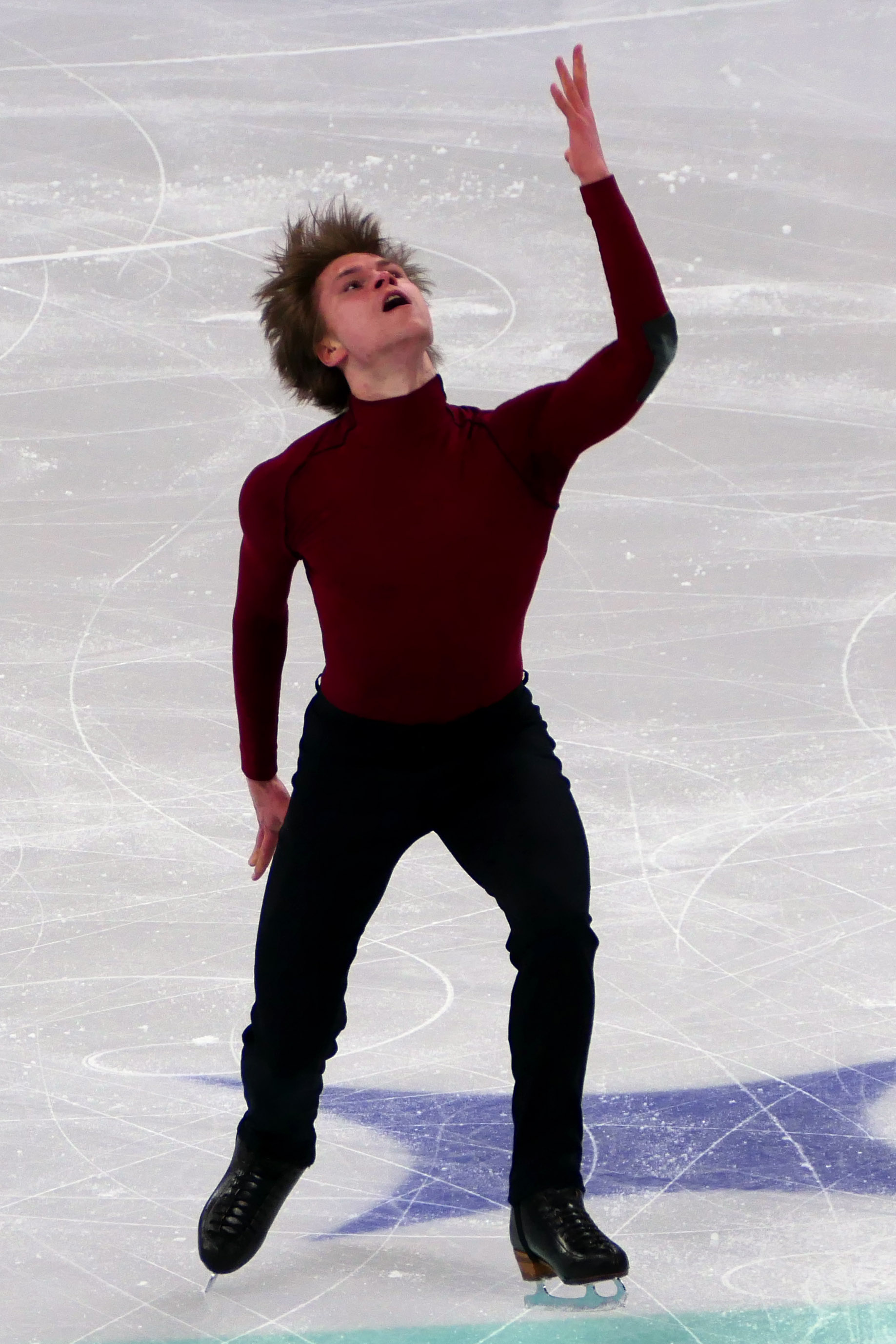
Vasiljevs during the free skate at the 2024 World Championships

=== 2023–24 season ===
After feeling somewhat disappointed by his results in the prior season, Vasiljevs set a goal to focus on the upcoming European Championships. He came seventh at the 2023 CS Nepela Memorial in his first competition of the season. On the Grand Prix, he was ninth at the 2023 Skate America. He went on to finish seventh at the 2023 NHK Trophy, and said he was continuing to struggle with the balance between technical development and "keeping my passion for artistry."

Vasiljevs came sixth at the 2024 European Championships. Following these championships, Vasiljevs decided to change his long program from "Blues Deluxe" to the "Lion King," a program that he had previously performed in exhibitions.

Finishing the season at the 2024 World Championships, he was seventh overall, having come eighth in each segment and receiving standing ovations for his performances.. Vasiljevs said that it had been a "rough season" that he was glad to be done with, but that it was "great to end it like this."

=== 2024–25 season ===
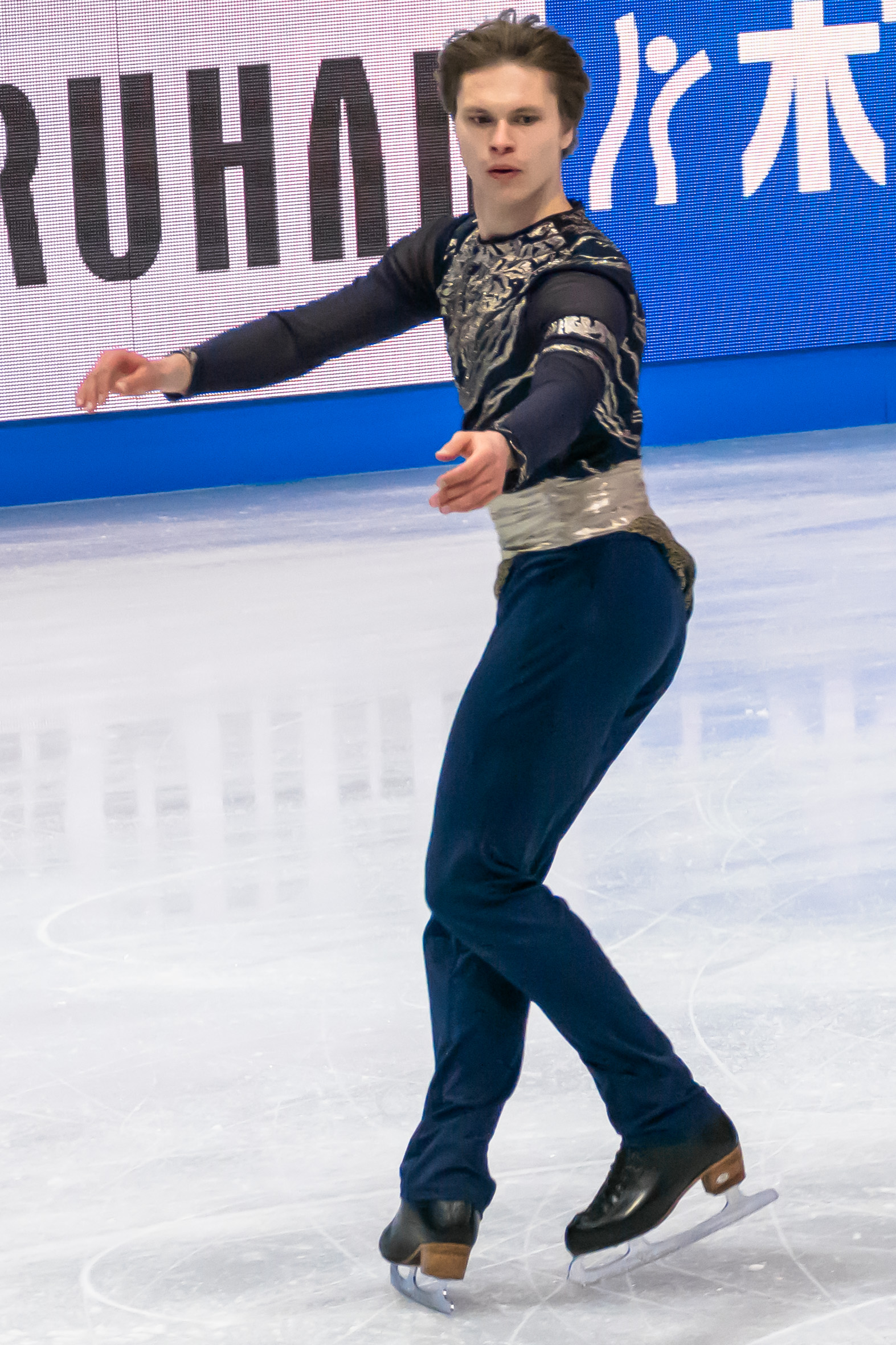
Vasiljevs during his free skate at the 2025 World Championships

Vasiljevs started the season by winning bronze at the 2024 CS Nebelhorn Trophy, before taking silver at the 2024 Shanghai Trophy.

Competing on the 2024–25 Grand Prix series, Vasiljevs finished fifth at 2024 Skate America. “This season I am aiming for consistent performances throughout the season,” Vasiljevs said. “That is my main goal. I think my new consistency comes from me believing and trusting more in myself and my own decisions. It’s still a learning process, I will never stop learning.” He went on to place seventh at the 2024 Cup of China.

In February, Vasiljevs competed at the 2025 European Championships. He was twelfth after the short program but rose to sixth place overall after having the third best score in the free skate. “I feel great!” said Vasiljevs after the free skate. “These are the moments—all the training, all the pain, everything we go through—it’s worth it. These are the moments I’m doing this for, and I’m so grateful. I love this arena. I love this ice rink. I would love to do something like this here one day without the competition pressure, just a performance on the ice, like an exhibition. I think I would feel exactly the same, but right now I’m feeling incredible.”

In March, at the 2025 World Championships in Boston, Massachusetts, United States, Vasiljevs finished the short program in sixteenth place after falling on his triple Axel attempt. He performed better in the free skate, which began with a successful quad Salchow. He skated cleanly for the rest of the program as well and was given a standing ovation by the crowd. His score of 252.26 points was his best result of the season, and he climbed to finish in eleventh place. Vasiljev's placement, along with that of fellow Latvian, Fedir Kulish, earned two quotas for Latvia in the men's event at the upcoming 2026 Winter Olympics. In an interview following the free skate, he shared, "I feel fantastic. This is a moment I will keep in my heart forever and for my entire life. I felt raw and elegant during that performance, just how my character should be. Everything connected. These are the moments I strive for. I’m really feeling satisfied right now, and that is really rare. I’m so proud of myself. I overcame myself and delivered a good performance."

=== 2025–26 season: Milano Cortina Olympics ===
In early September, Vasiļjevs shared via his Ko-fi account that undisclosed issues with the Latvian Skating Association had resulted in financial troubles, forcing him to withdraw from the 2025 CS Nebelhorn Trophy, where he had originally intended to start his season. Later in the month, it was reported that Vasiļjevs had been owed competition-related expenses dating back to January 2024, and that the Latvian Skating Association had only paid the all expenses he was owed in September 2025. The Latvian Skating Association said that the delay was because he and his manager had sent the request for funding late, while Vasiljevs's manager said they had been in repeated contact with the Association about the funding.

In late October, it was announced that Vasiļjevs was no longer training in Champéry and had parted ways with his longtime coach, Stéphane Lambiel. He subsequently went on to compete at the 2025 Cup of China, where he finished in tenth place. In November, Vasiljevs said he had returned to training in Champéry. At his next Grand Prix assignment, 2025 Finlandia Trophy, he again finished in tenth place after placing ninth in both competition segments.

In December, he competed at the Golden Spin of Zagreb, where he finished in fourth place just 0.03 points behind the bronze medalist. The following month, it was announced that Vasiļjevs had returned to Champéry to train under longtime coaches, Stéphane Lambiel and Angelo Dolfini. Going on to compete at the 2026 European Championships, Vasiļjevs debuted a new free skate program to the music of Gayane. At the event, he placed ninth in the short program and eighth in the free skate to finish in ninth place overall. Following the event, Vasiļjevs reflected on his challenging first half of the season. "This season is quite a journey," he said. "It’s not done yet, but so far I would say it’s probably the most challenging, the most interesting, and also the most enlightening season. The biggest thing I learned is that I am too much of an individualist. I can’t do everything by myself and always try to be perfect or to do it better. I cannot be on my own, so I need to find more trust, learn to work together, no matter what is wrong in front of personal healing maybe. This season teaches me a lot in the way that all things that are really worth building, you tend to have to do together. You cannot do everything alone, no matter how good you are as an individual."

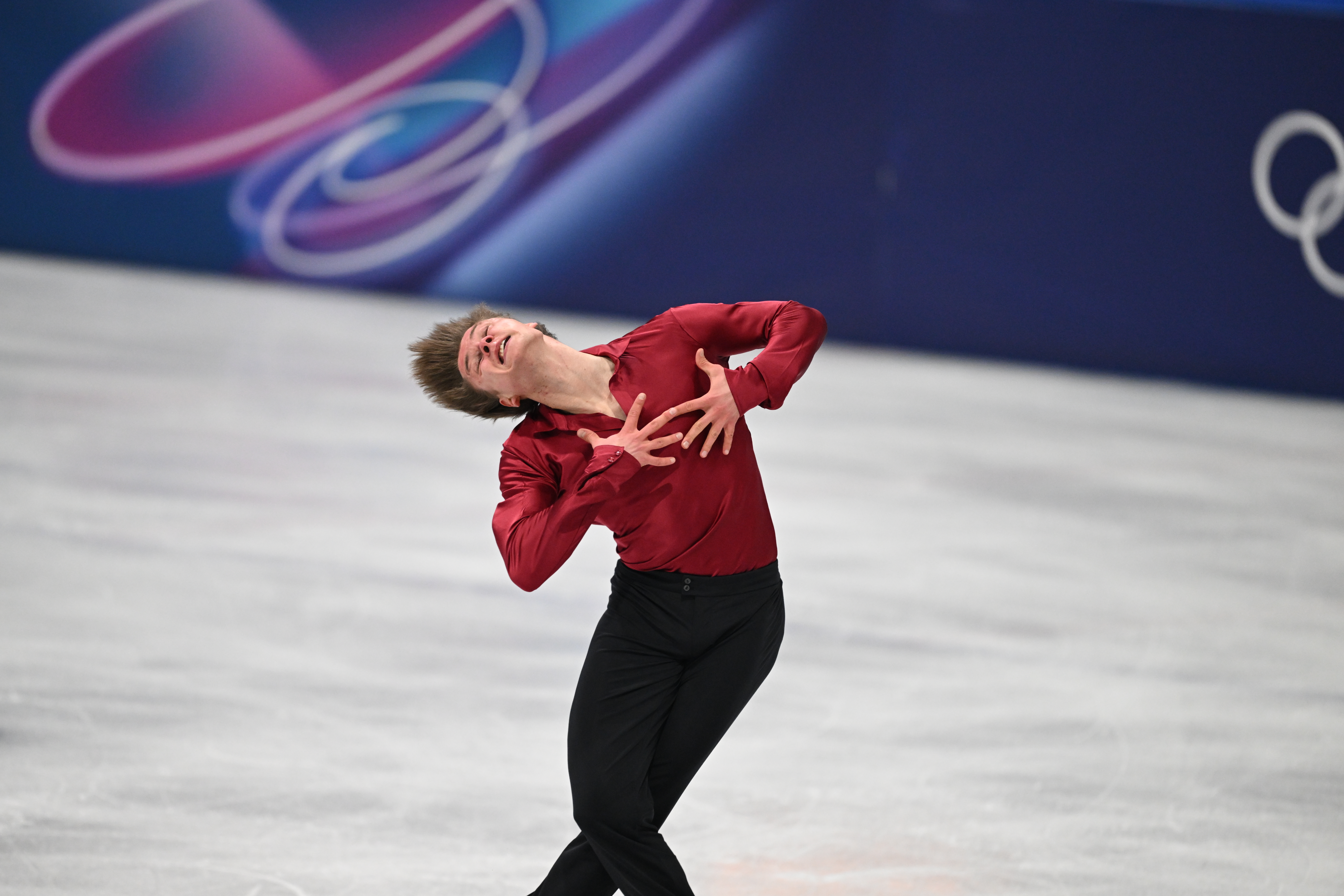
Vasiljevs performing at the 2026 Winter Olympics

On 10 February, Vasiļjevs competed in the short program segment at the 2026 Winter Olympics, placing seventeenth. "In the last days I got a bit sick," he admitted following his performance. "I experienced quite a lot of pressure today and I cannot guarantee the outcome. The only thing I can do is keep working and keep delivering my best day in and day out. I think that even with the inability to properly train for a good half of this bloody season, I can still show up and push myself."

Two days later, Vasiļjevs placed eighteenth in the free skate segment and finished in eighteenth place overall. "Technically, at this moment, I have fulfilled my personal commitment of reaching the Olympics," he said after his free skate. "This was a commitment I made to myself four years ago, so it’s a special feeling. I had anticipated and imagined this moment for a long time. There has been so much mental gymnastics happening in my head, especially during this event. Because I was sick and spent most of my time in bed, there was definitely no rest for the hamster in my head and this wheel has a lot of electrical production going on... This program still feels quite new to me — this was basically my fourth run-through of it. It’s a good challenge and very difficult to skate because of its structure. But hey, I finished it. The feeling is positive. The feeling is good."

In March, Vasiļjevs completed his season at the 2026 World Championships. He placed thirteenth in the short program and twenty-third in the free skate, finishing twenty-first overall.

=== 2026–27 season ===
Vasiljevs announced in August that he would not be competing this season because he had learned that he would not receive guaranteed funding from any Latvian sporting institutions. His manager stated that Vasiljevs "felt that the organizations he had represented throughout his career no longer needed him".

== Programs ==
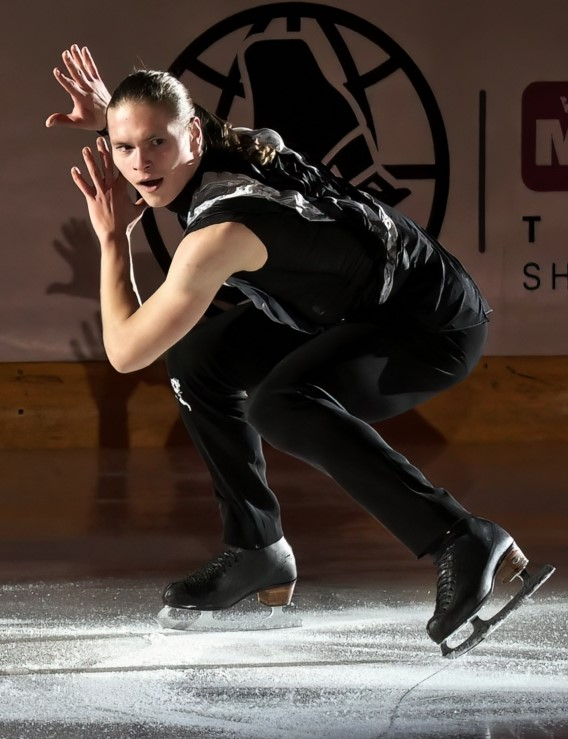
Vasiljevs during the gala exhibition at the 2022 MK John Wilson Trophy

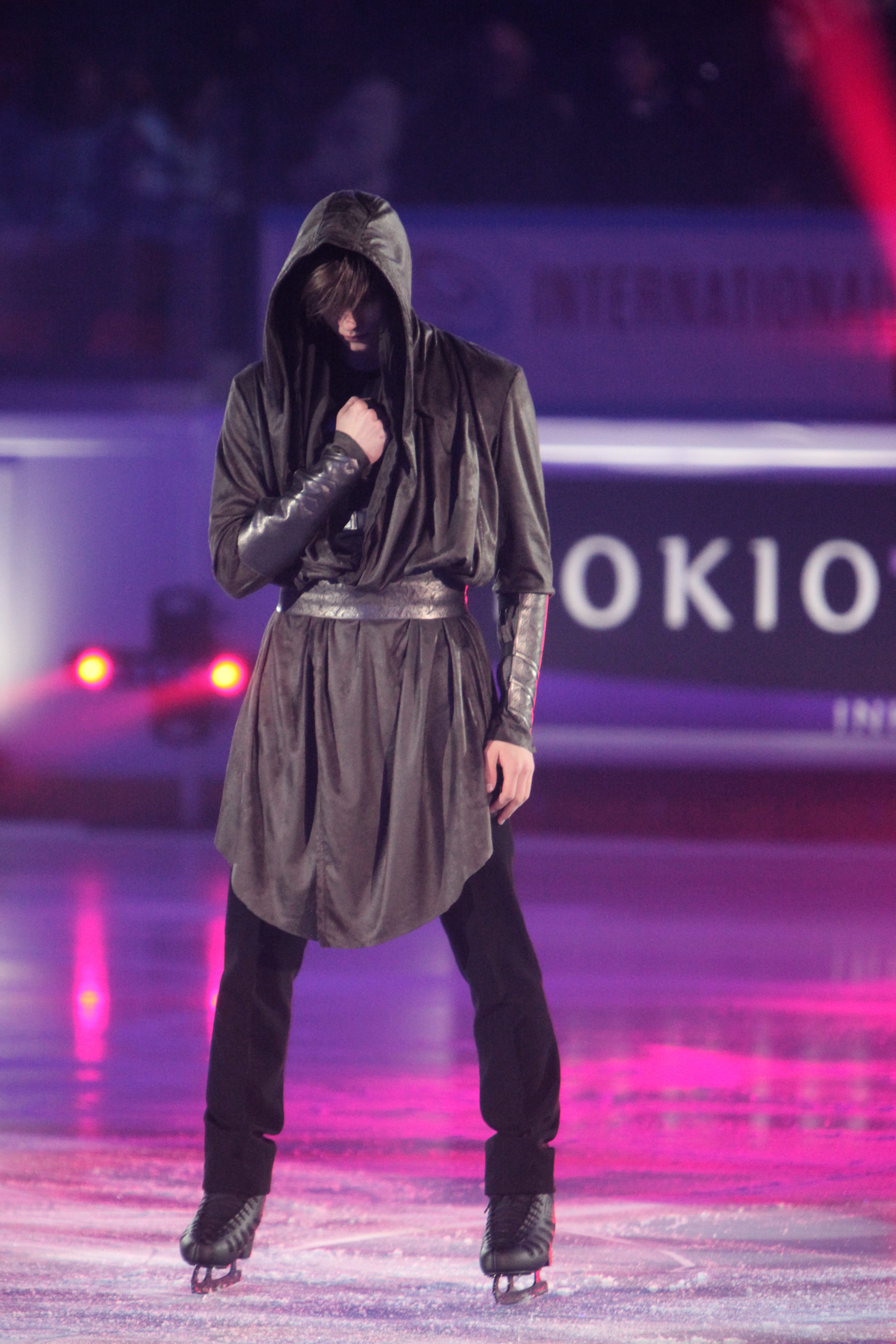
Vasiljevs during the gala exhibition at the 2018 Internationaux de France Gala

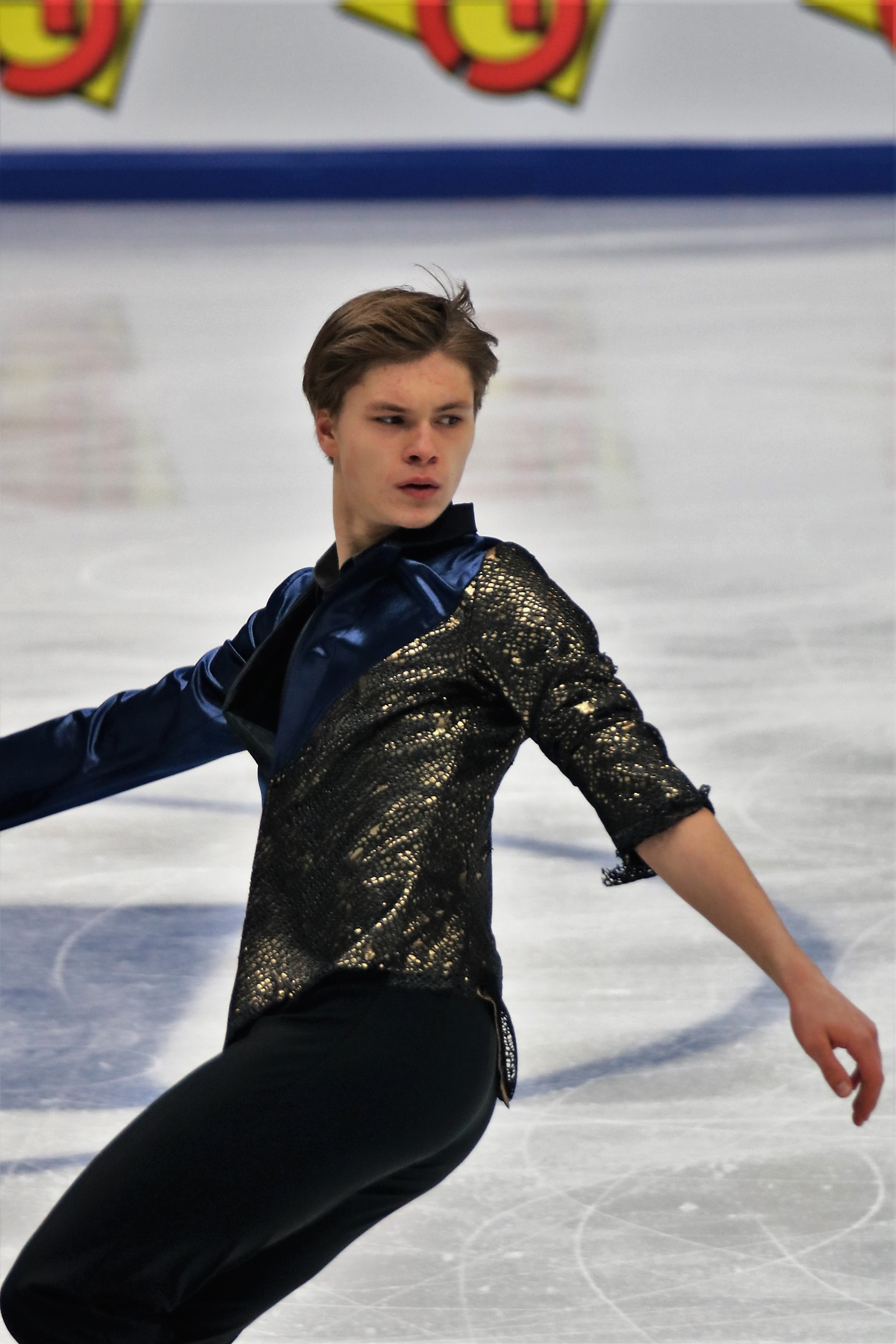
Vasiljevs at the 2018 European Championships

Season	Short program	Free skating	Exhibition
2025–2026	Unchained Melody by Todd Duncan performed by Roy Orbison choreo. by Stéphane Lambiel	Gayane; Suite no. 2: V. Lullaby; Suite no. 3: V. Solo - Love Duet; Suite no. 2: III. Dance of the Boys; Suite No. 2: VI Sabre Dance by Aram Khachaturian performed by André Anichanov & St. Petersburg State Symphony Orchestra choreo. by Stéphane Lambiel; La Bayadère; Act III: 37. Introduction; Act II: 28. Dance of the Indians; Act III: 47. Variation - Nikiya and Solor by Ludwig Minkus, Evergreen Symphony Orchestra & Kevin Galiè choreo. by Stéphane Lambiel, Vadim Muntagirov; James Bond; Another Way to Die (from Quantum of Solace) by Jack White & Alicia Keys; Vesper (from Casino Royale) by David Arnold; Day of the Dead (from Spectre by Thomas Newman; Final Ascent (from No Time to Die) by Hans Zimmer choreo. by Stéphane Lambiel	Hallelujah by Leonard Cohen performed by Thomas Feiner choreo. by Shae-Lynn Bourne; Du nimmst mich in den Arm by Max Mutzke
2024–2025	Helix by Justice choreo. by Stéphane Lambiel	La Bayadère; Act III: 37. Introduction; Act II: 28. Dance of the Indians; Act III: 47. Variation - Nikiya and Solor by Ludwig Minkus, Evergreen Symphony Orchestra & Kevin Galiè choreo. by Stéphane Lambiel, Vadim Muntagirov	Georgia on My Mind by Ray Charles; In the Air by Alexandra Stréliski; In the Air Tonight by Phil Collins performed by Judith Hill
2023–2024	Hallelujah by Leonard Cohen performed by Thomas Feiner choreo. by Shae-Lynn Bourne	The Lion King: The Rightful King by Hans Zimmer; He Lives in You by Lebo M performed by Kesha Shantrell and Matt Bloyd choreo. by Stéphane Lambiel; Blues Deluxe by Joe Bonamassa choreo. by Stéphane Lambiel	In the Air by Alexandra Stréliski; In the Air Tonight by Phil Collins performed by Judith Hill
2022–2023	Englishman in New York by Sting performed by Sting & Royal Philharmonic Concert Orchestra choreo. by Salome Brunner	Symphony No. 9 by Antonín Dvořák choreo. by Stéphane Lambiel	Dos Oruguitas (from Encanto) by Lin-Manuel Miranda performed by Lang Lang, Sebastián Yatra; Midnight Sky by Miley Cyrus performed by Momento
2021–2022	Sarakiz: II. Romanza by Karl Jenkins performed by Marat Bisengaliev & London Symphony Orchestra; The Battle Drums (from Princess Mononoke) by Joe Hisaishi choreo. by Stéphane Lambiel	Romeo and Juliet by Sergei Prokofiev choreo. by Stéphane Lambiel, Kateryna Shalkina	Iron by Woodkid choreo. by Sarah Dolan; It's a Sin by Elton John and Years & Years choreo. by Stéphane Lambiel
2020–2021	Le Grand Tango by Astor Piazzolla performed by Gidon Kremer choreo. by Stéphane Lambiel	Romeo and Juliet by Sergei Prokofiev choreo. by Stéphane Lambiel, Kateryna Shalkina	
2019–2020	Two Men In Love by The Irrepressibles choreo. by Sarah Dolan; Bloodstream by Tokio Myers choreo. by Salome Bruner	Lotus Feet by Steve Vai choreo. by Stéphane Lambiel	Bloodstream by Tokio Myers
2018–2019	Papa Was a Rollin' Stone by Norman Whitfield and Barrett Strong performed by Phil Collins choreo. by Stéphane Lambiel	A Way of Life; Red Warrior; A Hard Teacher; Idyll's End (from The Last Samurai) by Hans Zimmer; Strobe's nanafushi (Satori Mix) by Kodō choreo. by Kenta Kojiri	Iron by Woodkid choreo. by Sarah Dolan
2017–2018	Recondita armonia by Giacomo Puccini choreo. by Stéphane Lambiel	Put the Blame on Mame by Doctor 3; Anyone to Love; Sway by Michael Bublé choreo. by Stéphane Lambiel	They Live in You (from The Lion King) by Mark Mancina, Jay Rifkin choreo. by Stéphane Lambiel
2016–2017	Voodoo Child by Stevie Ray Vaughan choreo. by Stéphane Lambiel	The Four Seasons by Antonio Vivaldi recomposed by Max Richter choreo. by Stéphane Lambiel	Bring Him Home (Les Misérables) by Josh Groban choreo. by Stéphane Lambiel
2015–2016	Puttin' On the Ritz by Irving Berlin performed by Taco, Robbie Williams choreo. by Benoît Richaud	Adagio for Tron (from Tron: Legacy) by Daft Punk choreo. by Benoît Richaud	Puttin' On the Ritz by Irving Berlin performed by Taco, Robbie Williams choreo. by Benoît Richaud
2014–2015	Jazz Machine by Black Machine; Hey! Pachuco! (from The Mask) choreo. by Benoît Richaud	Adagio for Tron (from Tron: Legacy) by Daft Punk choreo. by Benoît Richaud	Heart Upon My Sleeve; Shame On Me by Avicii
2013–2014	Jazz Machine by Black Machine; Hey! Pachuco! (from The Mask) choreo. by Benoît Richaud	The Nutcracker by Pyotr Ilyich Tchaikovsky choreo. by Benoît Richaud	

== Competitive highlights ==
- GP – Event of the ISU Grand Prix Series
- JGP – Event of the ISU Junior Grand Prix Series
- CS – Event of the ISU Challenger Series
- C – Event was cancelled
- TBD – Assigned
- WD – Withdrew from competition
- Medals at team events are awarded for the team results only. Individual placements at team events are listed in parentheses.

Competition placements at senior level
Season	2015–16	2016–17	2017–18	2018–19	2019–20	2020–21	2021–22	2022–23	2023–24	2024–25	2025–26	2026-27
Winter Olympics			19th				13th				18th	
World Championships	14th	14th	6th	21st	C	18th	13th	13th	7th	11th	21st	
European Championships	12th	7th	4th	11th	6th	C	3rd	5th	6th	6th	9th	
Latvian Championships	1st	1st	1st		1st			1st	1st	1st		
GP Cup of China										7th	10th	TBD
GP Finland											4th	
GP France				7th			4th					
GP Italy							4th					
GP NHK Trophy		6th	6th	8th					7th			
GP Rostelecom Cup		11th	8th		6th							
GP Skate America									9th	5th		
GP Skate Canada					5th			10th				
GP Wilson Trophy								2nd				
CS Asian Open Trophy							4th					
CS Golden Spin of Zagreb							4th				4th	
CS Lombardia Trophy			4th									
CS Mordovian Ornament	5th											
CS Nebelhorn Trophy						1st				3rd		
CS Nepela Memorial					3rd			3rd	7th			
CS Tallinn Trophy	3rd											
Bavarian Open									1st			
Cup of Tyrol		1st	1st	1st								
Ice Star				1st								
Japan Open				2nd (5th)	1st (6th)							
Nordic Championships					1st							
Road to 26 Trophy										4th		
Shanghai Trophy										2nd		
Tallink Hotels Cup								2nd				

Competition placements at junior level
Season	2013–14	2014–15	2015–16
Winter Youth Olympics			2nd
Winter Youth Olympics (Team event)			3rd
World Junior Championships	8th	7th	8th
Latvian Championships	1st	1st	
JGP Estonia		4th	
JGP France		4th	
JGP Latvia	7th		2nd
JGP Poland	10th		2nd
Bavarian Open	1st		
Cup of Nice	1st		
Denkova-Staviski Cup	1st		
European Youth Olympic Festival		2nd	
Hellmut Seibt Memorial	1st		
Santa Claus Cup		1st	
Volvo Open Cup	1st		

== Detailed results ==
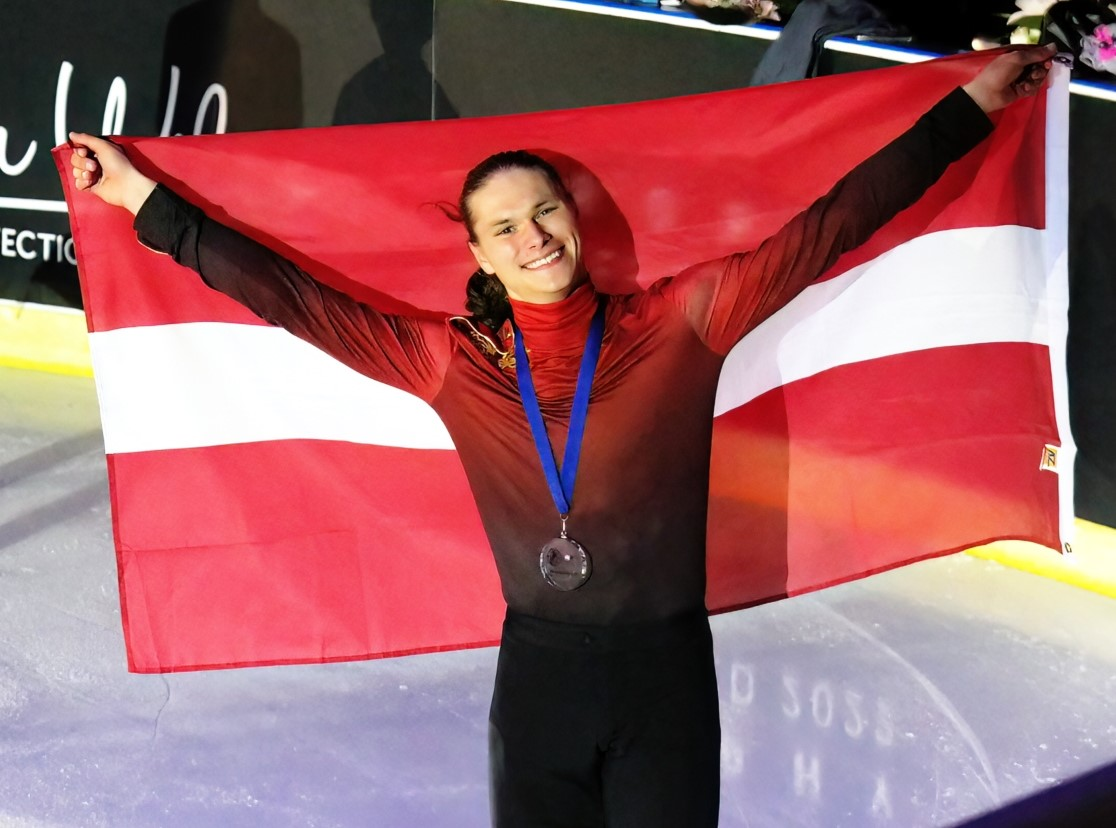
Vasiljevs during the medal ceremony at the 2022 MK John Wilson Trophy

ISU personal best scores in the +5/-5 GOE System
Segment	Type	Score	Event
Total	TSS	272.08	2022 European Championships
Short program	TSS	90.95	2022 World Championships
Short program	TES	46.86	2021 Internationaux de France
Short program	PCS	44.63	2022 World Championships
Free skating	TSS	181.84	2022 European Championships
Free skating	TES	93.12	2022 European Championships
Free skating	PCS	88.72	2022 European Championships

ISU personal best scores in the +3/-3 GOE System
Segment	Type	Score	Event
Total	TSS	254.86	2018 World Championships
Short program	TSS	85.11	2018 European Championships
Short program	TES	44.90	2018 European Championships
Short program	PCS	41.18	2018 Winter Olympics
Free skating	TSS	170.61	2018 World Championships
Free skating	TES	87.41	2018 World Championships
Free skating	PCS	83.20	2018 World Championships

- Small medals for the short program and free skating are only awarded at ISU Championships.
- Medals at team events are awarded for the team results only. Individual placements at team events are listed in parentheses.

=== Senior level ===
Results in the 2015–16 season
Date	Event	SP		FS		Total	
Date	Event	P	Score	P	Score	P	Score
Oct 16–19, 2015	(Russia) 2015 CS Mordovian Ornament	5	72.72	5	132.41	5	205.13
Nov 18–22, 2015	(Estonia) 2015 Tallinn Trophy	2	78.63	5	129.90	3	208.53
Dec 12–13, 2015	(Latvia) 2015 Latvian Championships	1	71.78	1	147.67	1	219.45
Jan 26–31, 2016	(Slovakia) 2016 European Championships	14	68.32	10	135.92	12	204.24
Mar 28 – Apr 3, 2016	(United States) 2016 World Championships	10	81.07	16	143.47	14	224.54

Results in the 2016–17 season
Date	Event	SP		FS		Total	
Date	Event	P	Score	P	Score	P	Score
Nov 4–6, 2016	(Russia) 2016 Rostelecom Cup	12	62.40	11	141.37	11	203.77
Nov 25–27, 2016	(Japan) 2016 NHK Trophy	10	70.50	5	153.23	6	223.73
Dec 3–4, 2016	(Latvia) 2016 Latvian Championships	1	77.82	1	150.72	1	228.54
Jan 25–29, 2017	(Czech Republic) 2017 European Championships	6	79.87	6	155.33	7	235.20
Feb 28 – Mar 5, 2017	(Austria) 2017 Cup of Tyrol	1	76.64	1	163.80	1	240.44
Mar 29 – Apr 2, 2017	(Finland) 2017 World Championships	14	81.73	13	157.27	14	239.00

Results in the 2017–18 season
Date	Event	SP		FS		Total	
Date	Event	P	Score	P	Score	P	Score
Sep 14–17, 2017	(Italy) 2017 CS Lombardia Trophy	5	76.17	4	152.74	4	228.91
Oct 20–22, 2017	(Russia) 2017 Rostelecom Cup	6	82.44	9	145.09	8	227.53
Nov 10–12, 2017	(Japan) 2017 NHK Trophy	8	76.51	5	158.29	6	234.80
Nov 22–25, 2017	(Austria) 2018 Cup of Tyrol	2	74.05	1	167.26	1	241.31
Dec 2–3, 2017	(Latvia) 2017 Latvian Championships	1	86.97	1	150.85	1	237.82
Jan 15–21, 2018	(Russia) 2018 European Championships	3	85.11	5	158.41	4	243.52
Feb 16–17, 2018	(South Korea) 2018 Winter Olympics	21	79.52	20	155.06	19	234.58
Mar 19–25, 2018	(Italy) 2018 World Championships	9	84.25	5	170.61	6	254.86

Results in the 2018–19 season
Date	Event	SP		FS		Total	
Date	Event	P	Score	P	Score	P	Score
Oct 6, 2018	2018 Japan Open	—N/a	—N/a	5	129.32	2	—N/a
Oct 18–21, 2018	(Belarus) 2018 Minsk-Arena Ice Star	2	74.52	1	154.11	1	228.63
Nov 9–11, 2018	(Japan) 2018 NHK Trophy	7	72.39	8	125.21	8	197.60
Nov 23–25, 2018	2018 Internationaux de France	5	82.30	7	138.96	7	221.16
Jan 21–27, 2019	(Belarus) 2019 European Championships	12	78.87	10	140.63	11	219.50
Feb 25 – Mar 3, 2019	(Austria) 2019 Cup of Tyrol	1	81.23	1	156.85	1	238.08
Mar 18–24, 2019	(Japan) 2019 World Championships	23	74.74	20	143.78	21	218.52

Results in the 2019–20 season
Date	Event	SP		FS		Total	
Date	Event	P	Score	P	Score	P	Score
Sep 20–21, 2019	(Slovakia) 2019 CS Nepela Memorial	2	79.76	3	150.21	3	229.97
Oct 5, 2019	2019 Japan Open	—N/a	—N/a	6	146.65	1	—N/a
Oct 25–27, 2019	2019 Skate Canada International	4	84.01	7	143.31	5	227.32
Nov 15–17, 2019	(Russia) 2019 Rostelecom Cup	5	87.08	10	154.01	6	241.09
Dec 14–15, 2019	(Latvia) 2019 Latvian Championships	1	84.51	1	142.72	1	227.23
Jan 20–26, 2020	(Austria) 2020 European Championships	5	80.44	7	152.23	6	232.67
Feb 5–9, 2020	(Norway) 2020 Nordic Championships	1	73.32	1	167.93	1	241.25

Results in the 2020–21 season
Date	Event	SP		FS		Total	
Date	Event	P	Score	P	Score	P	Score
Sep 23–26, 2020	(Germany) 2020 CS Nebelhorn Trophy	5	73.25	1	159.83	1	233.08
Mar 22–28, 2021	(Sweden) 2021 World Championships	14	81.22	18	131.83	18	213.05

Results in the 2021–22 season
Date	Event	SP		FS		Total	
Date	Event	P	Score	P	Score	P	Score
Oct 13–17, 2021	(China) 2021 CS Asian Open Trophy	4	84.75	7	132.93	4	217.68
Nov 5–7, 2021	(Italy) 2021 Gran Premio d'Italia	5	85.09	4	163.35	4	248.44
Nov 19–21, 2021	2021 Internationaux de France	2	89.76	7	164.72	4	254.48
Dec 7–11, 2021	(Croatia) 2021 CS Golden Spin of Zagreb	2	84.46	4	165.61	4	250.07
Jan 10–16, 2022	(Estonia) 2022 European Championships	6	90.24	3	181.84	3	272.08
Feb 8–10, 2022	(China) 2022 Winter Olympics	16	85.30	12	167.41	13	252.71
Mar 21–27, 2022	(France) 2022 World Championships	11	90.95	14	152.05	13	243.00

Results in the 2022–23 season
Date	Event	SP		FS		Total	
Date	Event	P	Score	P	Score	P	Score
Sep 29 – Oct 1, 2022	(Slovakia) 2022 CS Nepela Memorial	4	69.66	3	144.53	3	214.19
Oct 28–30, 2022	2022 Skate Canada International	7	69.01	10	128.44	10	197.45
Nov 11–13, 2022	(United Kingdom) 2022 MK John Wilson Trophy	3	83.01	2	171.55	2	254.56
Dec 17–18, 2022	2022 Latvia Trophy	1	73.08	1	167.50	1	240.58
Jan 25–29, 2023	(Finland) 2023 European Championships	3	84.81	6	151.54	5	236.35
Feb 16–19, 2023	(Estonia) 2023 Tallink Hotels Cup	1	79.94	3	144.05	2	223.99
Mar 22–26, 2023	(Japan) 2023 World Championships	11	82.37	13	160.78	13	243.15

Results in the 2023–24 season
Date	Event	SP		FS		Total	
Date	Event	P	Score	P	Score	P	Score
Sep 28-30, 2023	(Slovakia) 2023 CS Nepela Memorial	3	82.40	10	133.38	7	215.78
Oct 20–22, 2023	(United States) 2023 Skate America	6	75.84	10	139.50	9	215.34
Nov 24–26, 2023	(Japan) 2023 NHK Trophy	5	82.14	9	139.81	7	221.95
Dec 8–10, 2023	2023 Latvia Trophy	1	81.01	1	174.14	1	255.15
Jan 8–14, 2024	(Lithuania) 2024 European Championships	5	82.34	7	155.08	6	237.42
Jan 30-Feb 4, 2024	(Germany) 2024 Bavarian Open	1	85.36	1	170.82	1	256.18
Mar 18–24, 2024	(Canada) 2024 World Championships	8	89.42	8	89.42	7	257.80

Results in the 2024–25 season
Date	Event	SP		FS		Total	
Date	Event	P	Score	P	Score	P	Score
Sep 19–21, 2024	(Germany) 2024 CS Nebelhorn Trophy	1	83.78	5	151.94	3	235.72
Oct 3–5, 2024	(China) 2024 Shanghai Trophy	2	88.22	2	169,33	2	257.55
Oct 18–20, 2024	(United States) 2024 Skate America	5	85.10	5	166.37	5	251.47
Nov 22–24, 2024	2024 Cup of China	9	75.75	5	158.92	7	234.67
Jan 28 – Feb 2, 2025	(Estonia) 2025 European Championships	12	77.82	4	161.88	6	239.70
Feb 18–20, 2025	(Italy) Road to 26 Trophy	3	83.88	5	142.58	4	226.46
Mar 25–30, 2025	(United States) 2025 World Championships	16	79.99	9	172.27	11	252.26

Results in the 2025–26 season
Date	Event	SP		FS		Total	
Date	Event	P	Score	P	Score	P	Score
Oct 24–26, 2025	2025 Cup of China	11	66.54	9	137.97	10	204.51
Nov 21–23, 2025	(Finland) 2025 Finlandia Trophy	9	75.45	9	134.63	10	210.08
Dec 3–6, 2025	(Croatia) 2025 CS Golden Spin of Zagreb	3	79.00	5	140.57	4	219.57
Jan 13–18, 2026	(United Kingdom) 2026 European Championships	9	77.80	8	149.71	9	227.51
Feb 10–13, 2026	(Italy) 2026 Winter Olympics	17	82.44	18	144.02	18	226.46
Mar 24–29, 2026	(Czech Republic) 2026 World Championships	13	82.27	23	129.27	21	211.54

=== Junior level ===
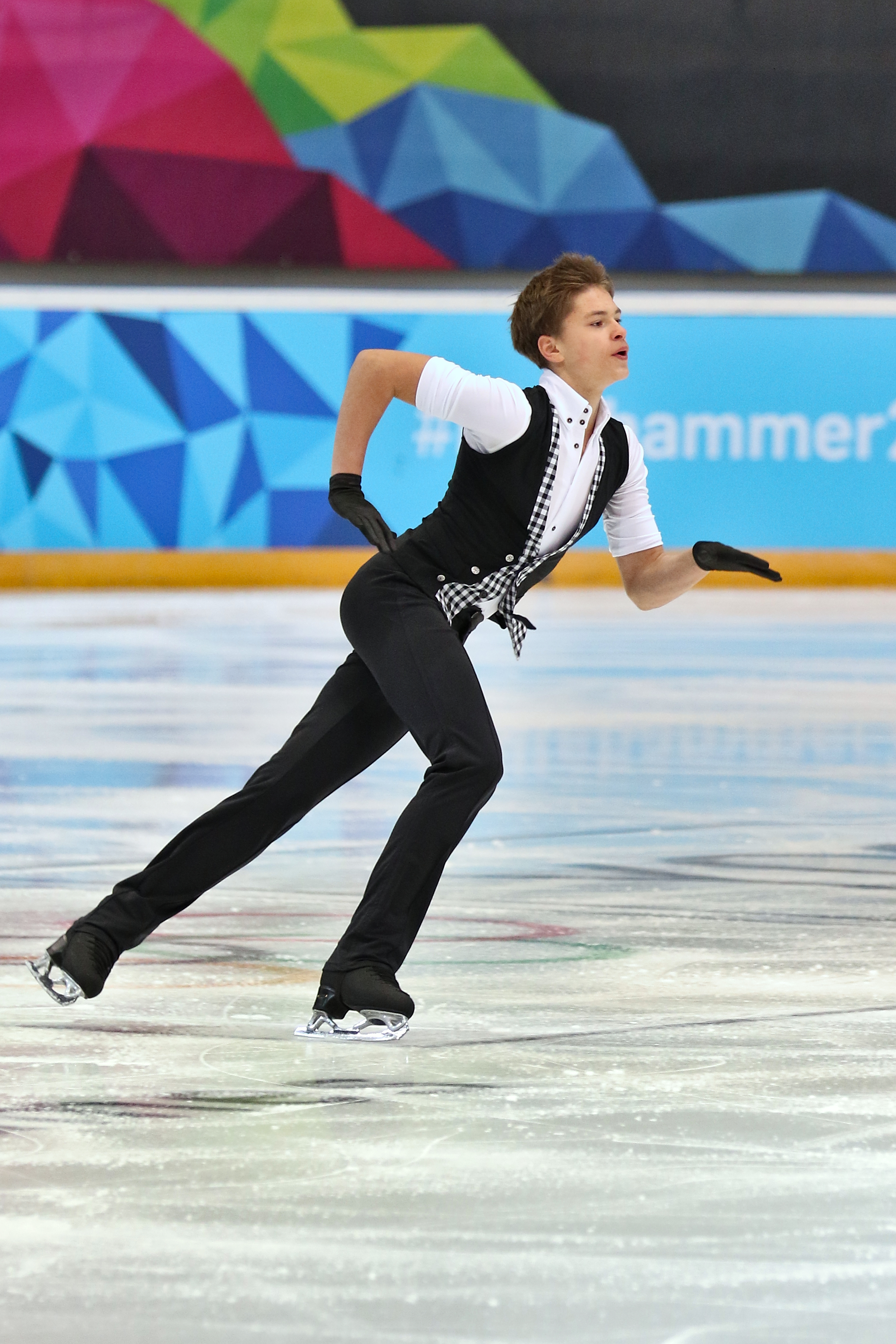
Vasiljevs at the 2016 Winter Youth Olympics

Results in the 2013–14 season
Date	Event	SP		FS		Total	
Date	Event	P	Score	P	Score	P	Score
Aug 29–30, 2013	2013 JGP Latvia	14	52.24	5	109.70	7	161.94
Sep 20–22, 2013	2013 JGP Poland	15	45.89	10	102.12	10	148.01
Oct 7–10, 2013	(France) 2013 International Cup of Nice	2	59.55	1	132.26	1	191.91
Nov 7–10, 2013	(Latvia) 2013 Volvo Open Cup	1	63.95	1	112.43	1	176.38
Nov 29 – Dec 1, 2013	(Bulgaria) 2013 Denkova-Staviski Cup	1	64.52	1	129.59	1	194.11
Dec 6–8, 2013	(Latvia) 2013 Latvian Championships (Junior)	1	62.80	1	114.64	1	177.44
Jan 29 – Feb 2, 2014	(Germany) 2014 Bavarian Open	1	64.73	1	116.06	1	180.79
Feb 26 – Mar 1, 2014	(Austria) 2014 Hellmut Seibt Memorial	1	68.41	1	130.80	1	199.21
Mar 10–16, 2014	(Bulgaria) 2014 World Junior Championships	11	62.50	7	126.83	8	189.33

Results in the 2014–15 season
Date	Event	SP		FS		Total	
Date	Event	P	Score	P	Score	P	Score
Aug 20–24, 2014	2014 JGP France	4	58.27	3	114.72	4	172.99
Sep 24–27, 2014	(Estonia) 2014 JGP Tallinn Cup	6	58.37	5	123.05	4	181.42
Dec 1–7, 2014	(Hungary) 2014 Santa Claus Cup	1	63.51	1	117.88	1	181.39
Dec 13–14, 2014	(Latvia) 2014 Latvian Championships (Junior)	1	60.04	1	126.22	1	186.26
Jan 26–28, 2015	(Austria) 2015 European Youth Olympic Festival	1	70.10	2	127.62	2	197.22
Mar 2–8, 2015	(Estonia) 2015 World Junior Championships	8	69.95	8	132.78	7	202.73

Results in the 2015–16 season
Date	Event	SP		FS		Total	
Date	Event	P	Score	P	Score	P	Score
Aug 26–30, 2015	2015 JGP Latvia	1	68.84	2	135.76	2	204.60
Sep 23–26, 2015	2015 JGP Poland	3	69.40	2	138.43	2	207.83
Feb 12–21, 2016	(Norway) 2016 Winter Youth Olympics	3	70.16	1	144.27	2	214.43
Feb 12–21, 2016	(Norway) 2016 Winter Youth Olympics (Team event)	—N/a	—N/a	1	149.09	3	—N/a
Mar 14–20, 2016	(Hungary) 2016 World Junior Championships	3	78.78	9	125.97	8	204.75
