= Figure skating at the 2015 European Youth Olympic Winter Festival =

- Date: January 26 – 28
- Season: 2014–15
- Location: Dornbirn, Austria

Champions
- Men's singles: (Ukraine) Ivan Pavlov
- Ladies' singles: (Russia) Alexandra Proklova
- Previous: 2013 European Youth Olympic Winter Festival
- Next: 2017 European Youth Olympic Winter Festival

Figure skating competition at the 2015 European Youth Olympic Winter Festival was held in Dornbirn, Austria from January 26 to 28, 2015. Medals were awarded in men's and ladies' singles.

== Medal summary ==
=== Medalists ===
Event	Gold	Silver	Bronze
Men	(Ukraine) Ivan Pavlov	(Latvia) Deniss Vasiļjevs	(Russia) Dmitri Aliev
Ladies	(Russia) Alexandra Proklova	(Germany) Lea Johanna Dastich	(France) Léa Serna

=== Medal table ===
Rank	Nation	Gold	Silver	Bronze	Total
1	Russia (RUS)	1	0	1	2
2	Ukraine (UKR)	1	0	0	1
3	Germany (GER)	0	1	0	1
3	Latvia (LAT)	0	1	0	1
5	France (FRA)	0	0	1	1
Totals (5 entries)		2	2	2	6

== Results ==
=== Men ===
Rank	Name	Nation	Total points	SP		FS	
1	Ivan Pavlov	Ukraine	200.15	2	69.64	1	130.51
2	Deniss Vasiļjevs	Latvia	197.72	1	70.10	2	127.62
3	Dmitri Aliev	Russia	184.48	3	62.66	3	121.82
4	Matteo Rizzo	Italy	171.99	4	58.40	4	113.59
5	Irakli Maysuradze	Georgia	168.43	5	56.49	5	111.94
6	Petr Kotlařík	Czech Republic	158.97	6	54.89	6	104.08
7	Aleix Gabara Xancó	Spain	152.11	9	48.14	7	103.97
8	Luc Economides	France	145.13	7	50.95	8	94.18
9	Roman Galay	Finland	143.51	8	50.43	9	93.08
10	Josh Brown	Great Britain	133.72	11	45.02	10	88.70
11	Daniil Zurav	Estonia	129.70	10	48.02	12	81.68
12	Artsiom Tseluiko	Belarus	124.46	14	39.34	11	85.12
13	Alexander Borovoj	Hungary	120.47	12	43.48	14	76.99
14	Jakub Kršňák	Slovakia	118.70	13	43.34	15	75.36
15	Nurullah Sahaka	Switzerland	115.64	15	37.43	13	78.21
16	Ryszard Gurtler	Poland	108.15	16	33.44	16	74.71
17	Efe Görkmen	Turkey	85.15	17	32.89	17	52.26
18	Flavius Luca	Romania	73.37	18	24.70	18	48.67

=== Ladies ===
Rank	Name	Nation	Total points	SP		FS	
1	Alexandra Proklova	Russia	152.86	2	50.75	1	102.11
2	Lea Johanna Dastich	Germany	142.24	4	49.03	2	93.21
3	Léa Serna	France	131.20	3	49.04	4	82.16
4	Jenni Saarinen	Finland	128.93	8	43.69	3	85.24
5	Angelina Kučvaļska	Latvia	126.46	5	46.46	5	80.00
6	Guia Maria Tagliapietra	Italy	123.27	7	44.39	6	78.88
7	Anastasia Galustyan	Armenia	122.97	1	52.94	10	70.03
8	Anna Dušková	Czech Republic	118.85	6	46.29	9	72.56
9	Fruzsina Medgyesi	Hungary	118.62	10	41.26	7	77.36
10	Danielle Harrison	Great Britain	107.73	22	31.40	8	76.33
11	Matilde Gianocca	Switzerland	102.50	14	36.12	12	66.38
12	Alexandra Hagarová	Slovakia	101.77	11	39.43	14	62.34
13	Juni Marie Benjaminsen	Norway	101.13	17	33.89	11	67.24
14	Aleksandra Golovkina	Lithuania	99.70	9	42.56	18	57.14
15	Kyarha van Tiel	Netherlands	99.35	13	37.21	15	62.14
16	Loena Hendrickx	Belgium	98.55	16	33.97	13	64.58
17	Dariya Gozhva	Ukraine	95.47	12	38.44	19	57.03
18	Selin Hafızoğlu	Turkey	93.99	21	32.22	16	61.77
19	Yelizaveta Ausiukevich	Belarus	91.40	18	33.26	17	58.14
20	Lara Nikola Roth	Austria	89.50	15	35.21	22	54.29
21	Teodora Markova	Bulgaria	88.68	20	33.04	20	55.64
22	Diana Reinsalu	Estonia	87.34	19	33.25	23	54.09
23	Agnieszka Rejment	Poland	85.37	24	30.40	21	54.97
24	Lana Petranović	Croatia	81.63	23	31.24	26	50.39
25	Nina Polšak	Slovenia	80.80	27	27.46	24	53.34
26	Maria Martinez Garcia	Spain	79.88	25	29.47	25	50.41
27	Kristín Valdís Örnólfsdóttir	Iceland	77.65	26	29.40	28	48.25
28	Zselyke Kenéz	Romania	75.78	28	27.38	27	48.40
29	Alexandra of Hanover	Monaco	37.16	29	11.72	29	25.44
30	Alma Šehić	Bosnia and Herzegovina	25.20	30	11.08	30	14.12
