= Loena Hendrickx =

Belgian retired figure skater (born 1999)

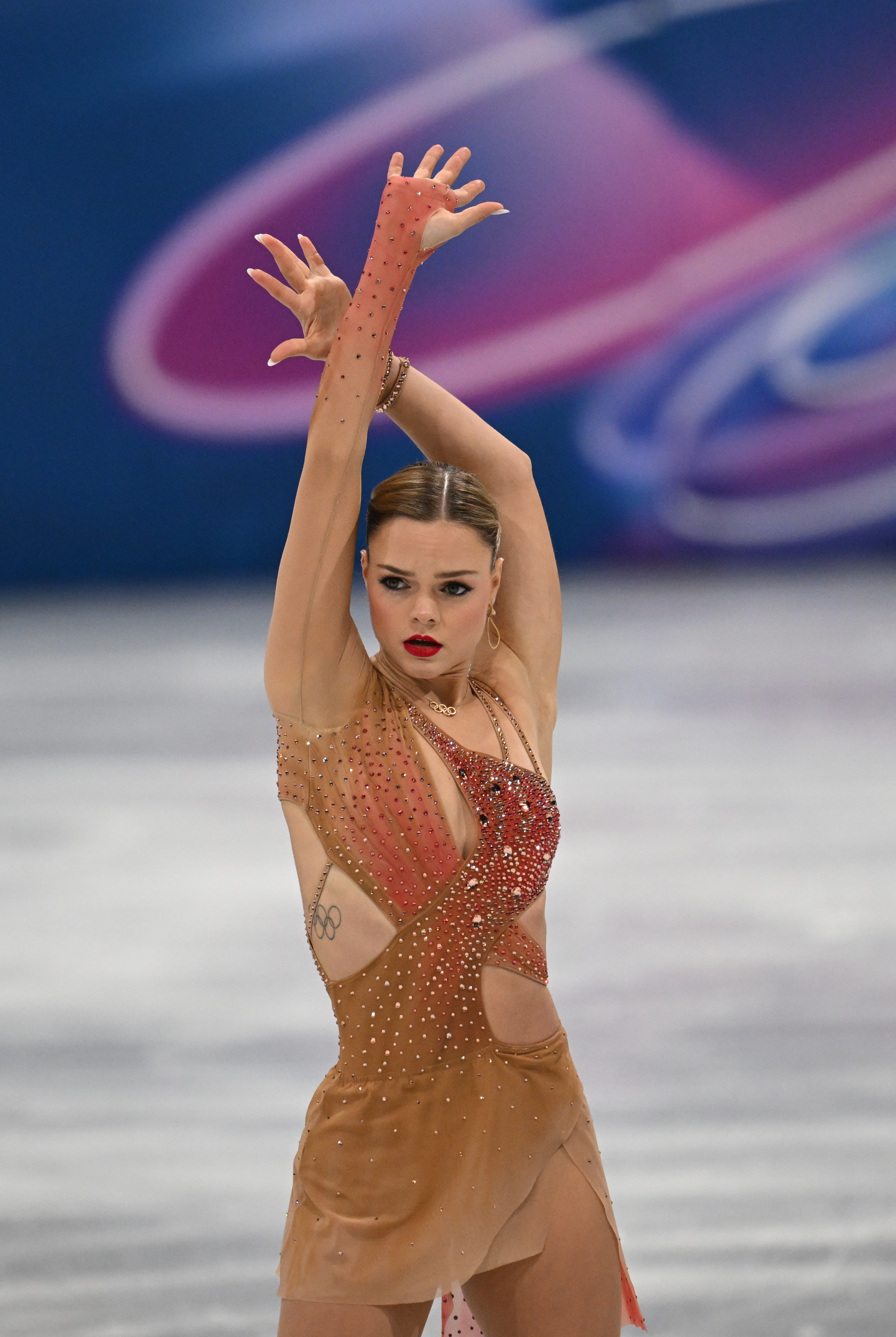
- Loena Hendrickx at the 2026 Winter Olympics

Personal information
- Born: 5 November 1999 (age 27) Turnhout, Belgium
- Home town: Arendonk, Belgium
- Height: 1.60 m (5 ft 3 in)

Figure skating career
- Country: Belgium
- Discipline: Women's singles
- Coach: Jorik Hendrickx
- Skating club: N.O.T. Turnhout
- Began skating: 2004
- Retired: June 24, 2026
- Highest WS: 8th (2021–22)

Medal record
Event	Gold medal – first place	Silver medal – second place	Bronze medal – third place
World Championships	0	1	1
European Championships	1	2	1
Grand Prix Final	0	1	1
Belgian Championships	5	0	0
Medal list
World Championships
Silver medal – second place	2022 Montpellier	Singles
Bronze medal – third place	2023 Saitama	Singles
European Championships
Gold medal – first place	2024 Kaunas	Singles
Silver medal – second place	2023 Espoo	Singles
Silver medal – second place	2026 Sheffield	Singles
Bronze medal – third place	2022 Tallinn	Singles
Grand Prix Final
Silver medal – second place	2023–24 Beijing	Singles
Bronze medal – third place	2022–23 Turin	Singles
Belgian Championships
Gold medal – first place	2017 Lommel	Singles
Gold medal – first place	2018 Liedekerke	Singles
Gold medal – first place	2019 Leuven	Singles
Gold medal – first place	2022 Leuven	Singles
Gold medal – first place	2023 Mechelen	Singles

Loena Hendrickx (Dutch: [ˈlunaː ˈɦɛndrɪks]; born 5 November 1999) is a Belgian retired figure skater. She is a two-time World medalist (2022, 2023), the 2024 European champion, a three-time European medalist (2022, 2023, 2026), a two-time ISU Grand Prix Final medalist (2022–23, 2023–24), a two-time Grand Prix gold medalist, and a five-time Belgian national champion (2017–2019, 2022–2023).

Hendrickx has finished within the top ten at five European Championships (2017–2018, 2022–2023) and five World Championships (2018, 2021–2024). She represented Belgium at three Winter Olympics (2018, 2022, 2026) finishing sixteenth, seventh, and fourteenth respectively. The most successful Belgian women's skater in history, she is the first-ever World, European, and Grand Prix medalist from Belgium in that discipline.

== Personal life ==
Loena Hendrickx was born on November 5, 1999, in Turnhout, Belgium. She is the younger sister of Belgian figure skater Jorik Hendrickx. She also has two other older brothers, Larris and Rinze, who played hockey.

She has a degree in preschool education.

Following the end of her competitive skating career, Hendrickx was announced as a castmember on the 2026–27 season of the Belgian edition of Dancing with the Stars.

== Career ==
=== Early years ===
Hendrickx began learning to skate in 2004. She experienced bullying in school over her figure skating until she transferred to a specialized sports secondary school in Eindhoven. She appeared internationally on the advanced novice level from December 2012 through December 2013 and then moved up to the junior ranks.

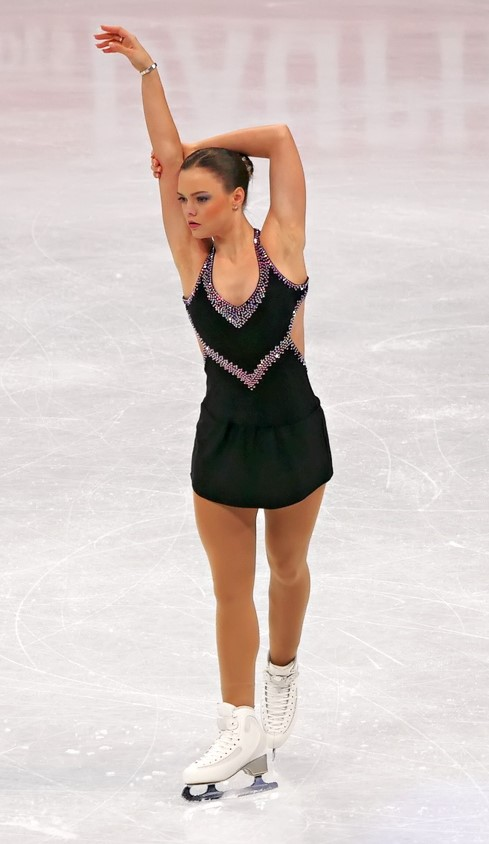
Hendrickx at the 2017 World Championships

=== 2014–2015 season: International junior debut ===
Coached by Carine Herrygers in Turnhout, Hendrickx debuted on the ISU Junior Grand Prix series, finishing seventeenth in Dresden, Germany. She won her second junior national title and then placed sixteenth at the 2015 European Youth Olympic Festival. She closed her season with junior bronze medals at the International Challenge Cup and Coupe du Printemps.

=== 2015–2016 season: Senior international debut ===
Competing in the 2015–16 ISU Junior Grand Prix series, Hendrickx placed fourteenth in Riga, Latvia, and then eleventh in Logroño, Spain. Her senior international debut came in October 2015 at the International Cup of Nice; she finished seventh at the event. She missed the second half of the season due to a spinal fracture and resumed skating after six months.

=== 2016–2017 season: Worlds debut ===
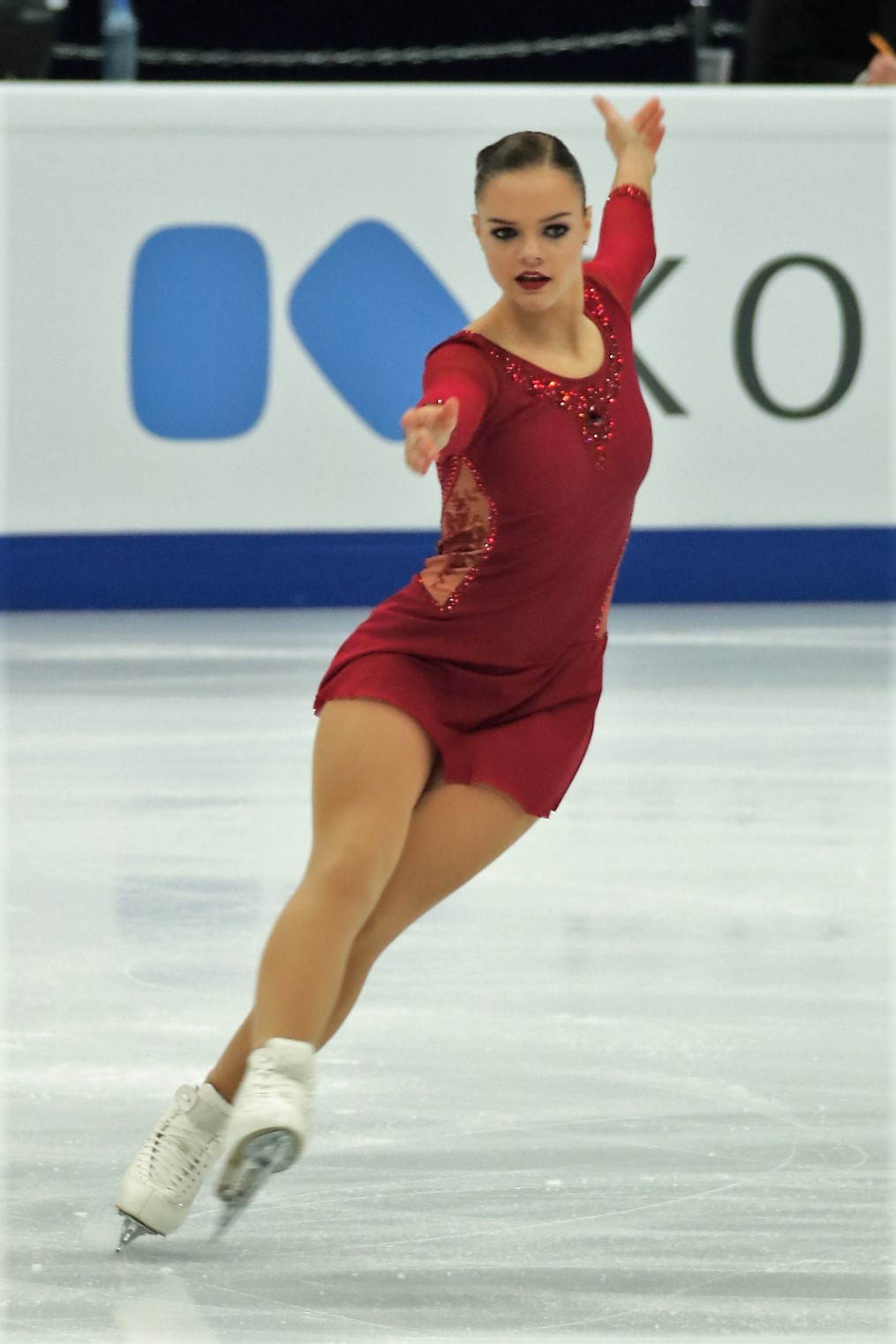
Hendrickx at the 2018 European Championships

After the closure of Turnhout's ice rink, Hendrickx and her brother decided to train at a temporary rink. Although still age-eligible to compete on the junior level, she focused on senior events. Starting her season on the ISU Challenger Series, she placed seventh at both the 2016 CS Nebelhorn Trophy and 2016 CS Finlandia Trophy. In October 2016, she won her first senior international medal – silver at the International Cup of Nice. In November, she was awarded silver at the NRW Trophy and gold at the Belgian Championships. A lack of financial support led to her having to decline an invitation to an international event in Russia.

In January 2017, Hendrickx competed at her first ISU Championship – the European Championships in Ostrava, Czech Republic. She suffered from foot pain during the event but nevertheless placed eleventh in the short program and advanced to the free skate, in which she ranked seventh, resulting in a final placement of seventh.

In February 2017, Hendrickx won gold at the International Challenge Cup in The Hague, Netherlands. In March, she placed seventeenth in the short, fourteenth in the free, and fifteenth overall at the 2017 World Championships in Helsinki, Finland. Due to her result, Belgium qualified a spot in the ladies event at the 2018 Winter Olympics in Pyeongchang, South Korea. After this, she received some financial reimbursement from the Belgian figure skating federation for her expenses, having previously financed her career entirely by herself.

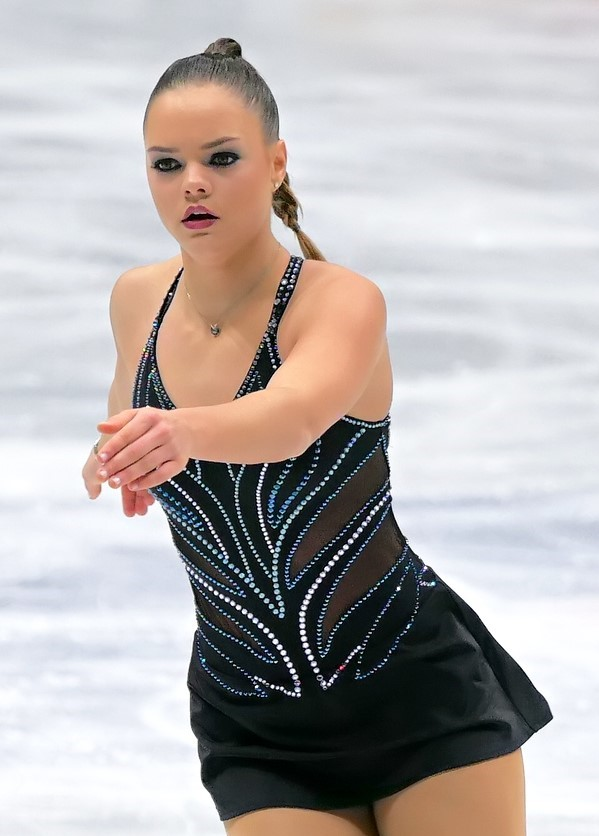
Hendrickx at the 2018 World Championships

=== 2017–2018 season: Pyeongchang Olympics ===
A knee injury forced Hendrickx to withdraw from three events early in the season. She repeated as Belgian national champion in December. In January, she placed fifth at the 2018 European Championships in Moscow, Russia. The following month, she represented Belgium at the 2018 Winter Olympics, where she and her brother Jorik were the only siblings competing in the singles skating events. The journey to Pyeongchang, South Korea, was the longest Hendrickx had ever travelled before and the first time their mother had attended a major international event to watch them compete in person. The family crowdfunded the costs to bring her to the event by organizing dinners in local parish halls. Hendrickx placed sixteenth overall.

At the 2018 World Championships in Milan, Italy, Hendrickx set new personal bests in both segments to finish in ninth place. Her result qualified Belgium to send two skaters to compete at the 2019 World Championships.

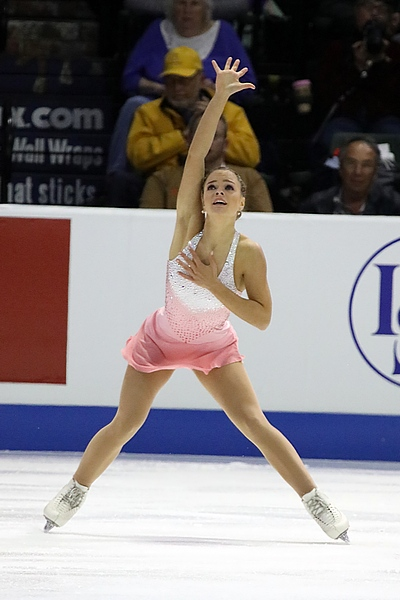
Hendrickx at the 2018 Skate America

=== 2018–2019 season: Challenger bronze, Grand Prix debut ===
Hendrickx began her season at the 2018 CS Nebelhorn Trophy, winning the bronze medal, her first Challenger medal. She achieved her goal of landing a triple Lutz-triple toe loop combination cleanly in both her short and free programs.

Her placement at the 2018 World Championships qualified her for two assignments on the 2018-19 Grand Prix. Making her first visit to the United States for 2018 Skate America, Hendrickx scored 54.13 in the short program but withdrew before the free skate for medical reasons. She placed fifth at the 2018 Grand Prix of Helsinki, her second event.

Hendrickx withdrew from the European Championships due to a back injury but was ready to compete at the World Championships in Saitama, where she placed twelfth. She had decided to attend the World Championships only a week prior.

=== 2019–2020 season: Multiple injuries ===
In the summer of 2019, Hendrickx sprained and fractured her ankle and tore three ligaments while at a training camp in Turkey. She returned to the ice in September but sustained another ankle injury on a triple flip attempt, necessitating another month off the ice. In December, she injured her ankle a third time, forcing her to withdraw from the 2020 European Championships. At the end of January 2020, she had a tendon injury in her left ankle, keeping her off the ice until past when the onset of the COVID-19 pandemic closed rinks. Upon returning to the ice three months later, she remarked, "I was so happy, without pain, and the motivation was there again."

=== 2020–2021 season: Comeback ===
Hendrickx was slated to make her return to competition at the 2020 CS Nebelhorn Trophy. She was added to the roster after another skater's withdrawal but withdrew before the competition started. Hendrickx started her 2020-21 season at the inaugural CS Budapest Trophy, achieving a new personal best in the short program and winning the gold medal overall. She was scheduled to compete on the Grand Prix at the 2020 Internationaux de France, but the event was cancelled as a result of the COVID-19 pandemic. She later won the International Challenge Cup for the second time in her career. She stated afterwards that she was still managing her back pain and had refrained from certain moves in training for three months.

At the 2021 World Championships in Stockholm, Hendrickx placed tenth in the short program after falling on her triple flip. In the free skate, Hendrickx skated cleanly to score a new personal best of 141.16, placing fourth in that segment and fifth overall. Her free skate score was only 0.44 points behind that of Elizaveta Tuktamysheva's, who was third in that segment. Hendrickx's fifth-place ordinal qualified two placements for Belgium at the 2022 World Championships, and the possibility of a second spot at the 2022 Winter Olympic Games in Beijing. Looking ahead, she remarked: "an Olympic medal is a childhood dream, but let me stay injury-free first and foremost."

=== 2021–2022 season: Beijing Olympics and World silver ===
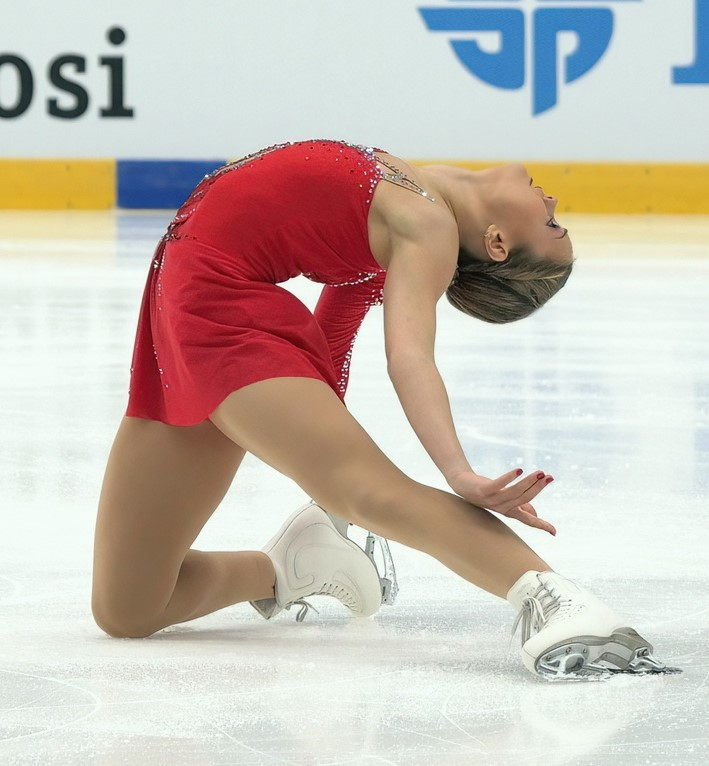
Hendrickx finishing her short program at the 2021 CS Finlandia Trophy

In the pre-season, Hendrickx spent time training with famed Russian coach Alexei Mishin. In August, she announced that she was parting ways with longtime coach Carine Herrygers and would subsequently be coached solely by her brother Jorik and choreographer Adam Solya. Beginning her season at the 2021 CS Finlandia Trophy, she placed fourth.

Hendrickx's first Grand Prix assignment was initially the 2021 Cup of China, but following its cancellation, she was reassigned to the 2021 Gran Premio d'Italia in Turin. On her birthday, Hendrickx unexpectedly placed first in the short program with a new personal best of 73.52, following an error by pre-event favourite and World champion Anna Shcherbakova. She was third in the free skate and dropped behind Shcherbakova and Maiia Khromykh to take the bronze medal. This was both her first Grand Prix medal and the first ever for a Belgian woman, which she described as "a dream come true." In the interval between international events, Hendrickx won the Belgian senior national title for the fourth time. She then placed fifth at the 2021 Rostelecom Cup. In the free skate, she attempted a triple loop, which she said had "always been a challenge for me. Last week, it was pretty consistent, so we tried it today."

Hendrickx attended her first European Championships in four years in Tallinn and placed second in the short program with a clean skate, winning a silver medal. She struggled in the free skate, falling twice and placing fifth in that segment, dropping her to fourth place. She said afterwards that given the strength of the Russian skaters in the free, she had not expected to medal, but that "I would be happier being fourth with a better free program." However, in January 2024, the Court of Arbitration for Sport made the decision to annul Kamila Valieva's first-place result after she was found to have tested positive for using banned substances at the 2022 Russian Championships. As a result, Hendrickx was moved up by one placement and named the 2022 European Championship bronze medalist.

Named to her second Belgian Olympic team, Hendrickx served as Belgium's co-flagbearer during the opening ceremonies, alongside alpine skier Armand Marchant. Hendrickx began the 2022 Winter Olympics women's event placing seventh in the short program. She put a hand down on her double Axel and fought for other jump landings, admitting after, "I think I had a little adrenaline, and 70 points is still okay." Ninth in the free skate, she finished eighth overall. She was later moved up to seventh place when the IOC Executive Board approved an Olympic diploma reallocation for Beijing 2022 after the final disqualification of Kamila Valieva (ROC), who originally finished fourth.

The Belgian skating federation initially forgot to submit Hendrickx's name to compete at the 2022 World Championships, but upon publication of the entry list, they were able to correct this via appeal to ISU president Jan Dijkema. Due to Vladimir Putin's invasion of Ukraine days after the Olympics concluded, all Russian and Belarusian athletes were banned from participating at the World Championships. With the Russian women who had dominated the sport for most of the preceding eight years absence, Hendrickx was perceived as a major podium contender. She tore a groin muscle three weeks before the championships and was unable to train before the competition began. Despite a rough landing on her combination, Hendrickx finished second in the short program, winning a silver small medal. With 75.00 points, she was 5.32 points behind segment leader Kaori Sakamoto and 2.45 points ahead of third-place Mariah Bell. In the free skate, Hendrickx underrotated two triple jumps, but placed second in that segment as well to take the silver medal. She became the first Belgian woman to win a World Championship medal and the first Belgian figure skater to do so in any discipline since the pair team Lannoy/Baugniet in 1948. Reflecting on her struggle with injury, Hendrickx said, "I'm proud I didn't give up despite my injury, but I think today was a limit, and now my body needs a rest."

=== 2022–2023 season: Grand Prix Final bronze, European silver, World bronze ===
For Hendrickx's short program for the new season, regular choreographer Adam Solya created a Latin-themed medley of "Sí, Mamá" and "Mi Gente." She said that "in the beginning, I was afraid because I didn't know if it would suit me. I really need to use my body and my hips, and I am not really a dance person. But after I watched a video of it with all the details, with the dress and the makeup, I was pleased."

Hendrickx was assigned to the 2022 CS Nebelhorn Trophy to start the season, entering as the pre-event favourite. She won the gold medal by almost fifteen points, though narrowly finishing second in the free skate behind silver medalist Wi Seo-yeong. She was then invited to be part of Team Europe at the Japan Open. She finished second in the women's free skate competition, behind Japan's Kaori Sakamoto, with a score of 132.53. Team Europe finished third overall.

After being disappointed by the free skate scores at her first two events, Hendrickx and her choreographer, Adam Solya, made changes to program music and choreography. Hendrickx then competed at the 2022 Grand Prix de France Grand Prix event, where she won both the short program and free skate, the latter taking place on her 23rd birthday. Her gold medal was her first ISU Grand Prix gold medal and the first ISU Grand Prix gold medal for a Belgian skater in any discipline. She was presented with a birthday cake in the Kiss and cry after the free skate by French skater Maé-Bérénice Méité. Two weeks later, she won her fifth Belgian national title. She debuted another revision to her free skate, discarding Fachinetti's "Poeta" in favour of additional original music by Karl Hugo. Hendrickx said that the changes were made because she "wanted to expand the artistry of the program, the accents and the nuances," adding that it was "really unique that this music has been especially made for me." Hendrickx also fell ill at the time of the event, later saying, "my blood results were not very good, so I had to take a little bit of rest." Her second event, the 2022 Grand Prix of Espoo, was widely seen as a contest between her and 2022 MK John Wilson Trophy champion Mai Mihara of Japan. Hendrickx won the short program, finishing 1.30 points ahead of Mihara. Both she and Mihara struggled in the free skate segment, in which Hendrickx was third and finished second overall, with Mihara taking the gold. She said of her own performance, "I know I can do much better, but we are all human, and it happens."

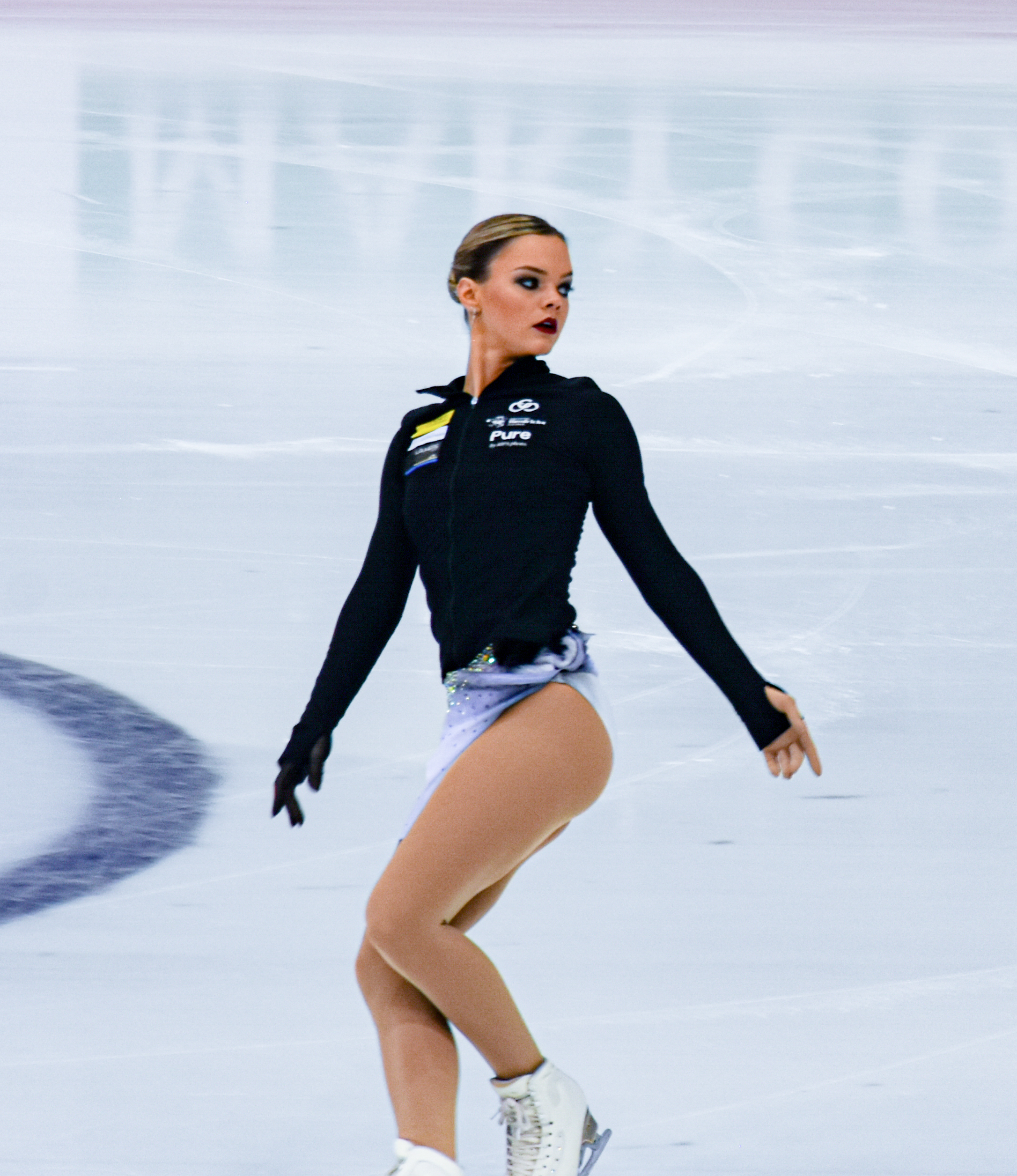
Hendrickx at the 2022–23 Grand Prix Final

Hendrickx's Grand Prix results qualified her for the Grand Prix Final in Turin, which she entered as one of the medal favourites, in particular opposite both Mihara and reigning World champion Kaori Sakamoto. She finished third in the short program, behind Sakamoto and Mihara, after both parts of her jump combination were deemed slightly underrotated. She struggled more in the free skate, making several jump errors, but with the competition as a whole being "turbulent" and with many skaters underperforming, she remained in third place overall and won the bronze medal. This was another figure skating milestone for Belgium. She said afterwards that she was "shocked too about the results today, and also, I'm really disappointed about my skate today. It wasn't so good, I know I can do better. I'm happy am still in the third place."

Entering the 2023 European Championships as the favourite for the gold medal, Hendrickx underrotated her triple Lutz and managed only a double toe loop as the second part of her jump combination, placing second in that segment behind Georgian Anastasiia Gubanova. She said that "this season I showed some very good short programs. Here it just didn't work out. I think I will cry in the hotel and then I will have a fresh start tomorrow." Hendrickx fell twice in the free skate, placing third in that segment, but remaining second overall by a margin of 0.97 points over Swiss bronze medalist Kimmy Repond. This was the first European Championship medal for a Belgian woman. She said that she had "made history for Belgium and my very first European medal. I should be proud but as a professional athlete I can't be satisfied with what I showed."

After her disappointment at the European Championships, Hendrickx enlisted former Olympian and sports psychologist Eline Berings to assist her in the leadup to the 2023 World Championships in Saitama. For the first time in Hendrickx's career, other Belgian skaters were able to make use of the additional berths she had qualified with her previous high placements at the World Championships – she, Nina Pinzarrone and national silver medalist Jade Hovine comprised the largest Belgian women's delegation in event history. Hendrickx said that she "felt very proud because I was the one who made this moment happen. Like, I gave them the chance to be at Worlds together with me." She fell on her attempted jump combination in the short program, but still finished fifth in the segment, less than two points back of Mihara in third place. In the free skate, Henrickx landed five clean triple jumps, and fell on her Lutz attempt. She nevertheless finished fourth in the segment, and came third overall, winning the bronze medal. Despite the mistake, she said that "I think I had a really strong program, and to earn a second world medal for Belgium and myself is just an amazing feeling." Reflecting on the season as a whole, Hendrickx said that "the competitions in the first half were not so good, but I kept working hard. For me, to enjoy competing more, and to believe in myself is what I want to take into next season."

=== 2023–2024 season: European gold and Grand Prix Final silver ===
In the off-season, Hendrickx joined Stars on Ice for its Japanese, Canadian, and American tours, performing in North America for the first time. After her difficulties during the previous season as a result of expectations, she identified the importance of "finding the love and the passion for the sport again also when I have to compete." She began the season at the Japan Open, where her results mirrored the previous year, finishing second among the women and with the European team finishing third.

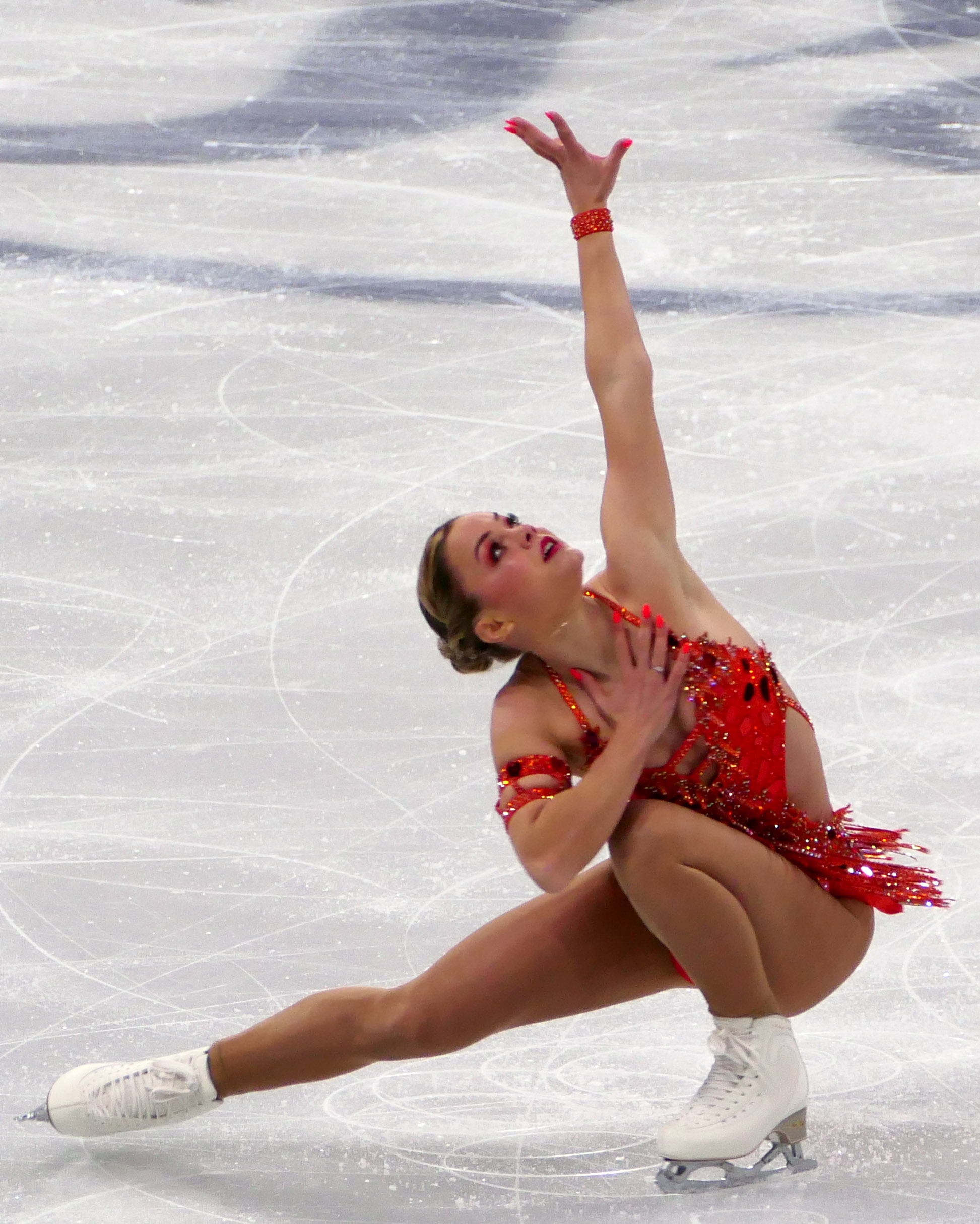
Hendrickx performing a broken-leg sit spin during her short program at the 2024 World Championships

Hendrickx began the Grand Prix at the 2023 Skate America, entering as the favourite for the title. She won the short program despite underrotating the second part of her jump combination. She went on to win the free skate as well, nearly equaling her personal best in that segment and narrowly setting a new personal best total score (221.28), despite another underrotation call on her jump combination. Hendrickx felt in poor condition going in the 2023 Cup of China, later saying "I didn't eat well here, I wasn't hungry. I tried to eat but it was pretty hard." She finished first in the short program, despite a quarter rotation call on her triple toe loop and singling her double Axel attempt. However, she struggled in the free skate, coming third in that segment and dropping to third overall, albeit only 2.48 points back of gold medalist Hana Yoshida. She explained afterward that she "didn't feel ready and confident. I had less energy. It was enough for the short, but not for the free." The following weekend she withdrew from the Belgian championships, citing continued illness.

Upon her return to Belgium, Hendrickx "lost a lot of weight and muscles" as a result of the illness, and also injured her back while training a triple Lutz jump. With physiotherapy, she was able to attend the 2023–24 Grand Prix Final, where she placed second in the short program despite a landing error on her triple flip. Jump errors in the second half of her free skate saw her fourth in that segment, but she remained second overall, finishing 0.20 points ahead of Yoshida in third place. Fellow Belgian skater Nina Pinzarrone also qualified to the Final and placed fourth, which Hendrickx expressed pride in.

Hendrickx entered the European Championships in Kaunas as the title favourite, and won both segments of the competition to take the gold medal, despite a few minor jump errors. This was the first European title for Belgium in the women's event, and the first in any discipline since 1947. With Pinzarrone joining her on the podium as bronze medalist, this was also the first time two Belgian women had made the European podium at the same time. Of the result, Hendrickx said "I have no words, I'm just so happy. I worked so hard. Now all the emotion's coming."

In early February, in advance of the 2024 World Championships, Hendrickx received the Best Costume award at the 2024 ISU Skating Awards for her free program outfit. She dealt with a hip injury, as a result of which she modified her short program layout to move her jump combination into the first half. Hendrickx won the short program in Montreal, claiming a gold small medal and a new personal best score of 76.98. She noted afterward that this was her first competition in Canada, though she had performed there with Stars on Ice, saying she "was very excited. The crowd loved me and I loved the crowd." The free skate proved more difficult, with several jumps called underrotated and a fall on her triple flip. She was eighth in the segment and dropped to fourth overall, 3.34 points behind South Korean bronze medalist Kim Chae-yeon. Hendrickx discussed the stress of the event, concluding she was still "very proud of the short program" and that she aimed for and admired the consistency of eventual champion Kaori Sakamoto.

=== 2024–2025 season: Struggles with injury ===
Hendrickx said she felt she had "achieved a great deal in the sport" and wanted to "enjoy" competing going into her 10th year as a senior. She began the season in early October by finishing third at the 2024 Shanghai Trophy following an error-riddled free skate. One week following the event, Hendrickx announced her withdrawal from the 2024 Grand Prix de France, citing a need for additional time to prepare for upcoming events. In early November, it announced that Hendrickx had also withdrawn from the 2024 Finlandia Trophy two weeks prior to the event. Regarding this, Hendrickx explained, "I had a good summer and training was going well. But despite that, I felt there was no progress. As the season approached, the pressure increased. And that worked against me."

She announced that she would return to competition at the 2024 CS Golden Spin of Zagreb in early December. However, in December, she withdrew from that event as well after she twisted her ankle in training and said that she was focusing on preparing for the 2025 European Championships in January. In January, she withdrew from the European Championships due to her sprain causing ankle instability, which prevented her from performing some jumps.

In late January, Hendrickx announced that she would miss the rest of the season because she needed to undergo surgery in February to repair her ankle, which had damaged ligaments and had never fully recovered from her injuries in 2019. Hendrickx said that she was not yet ready to stop competing and that after her surgery, she would focus on rehabilitation in hopes of competing at the 2026 Winter Olympics.

=== 2025–2026 season: Comeback, Milano Cortina Olympics, and retirement ===
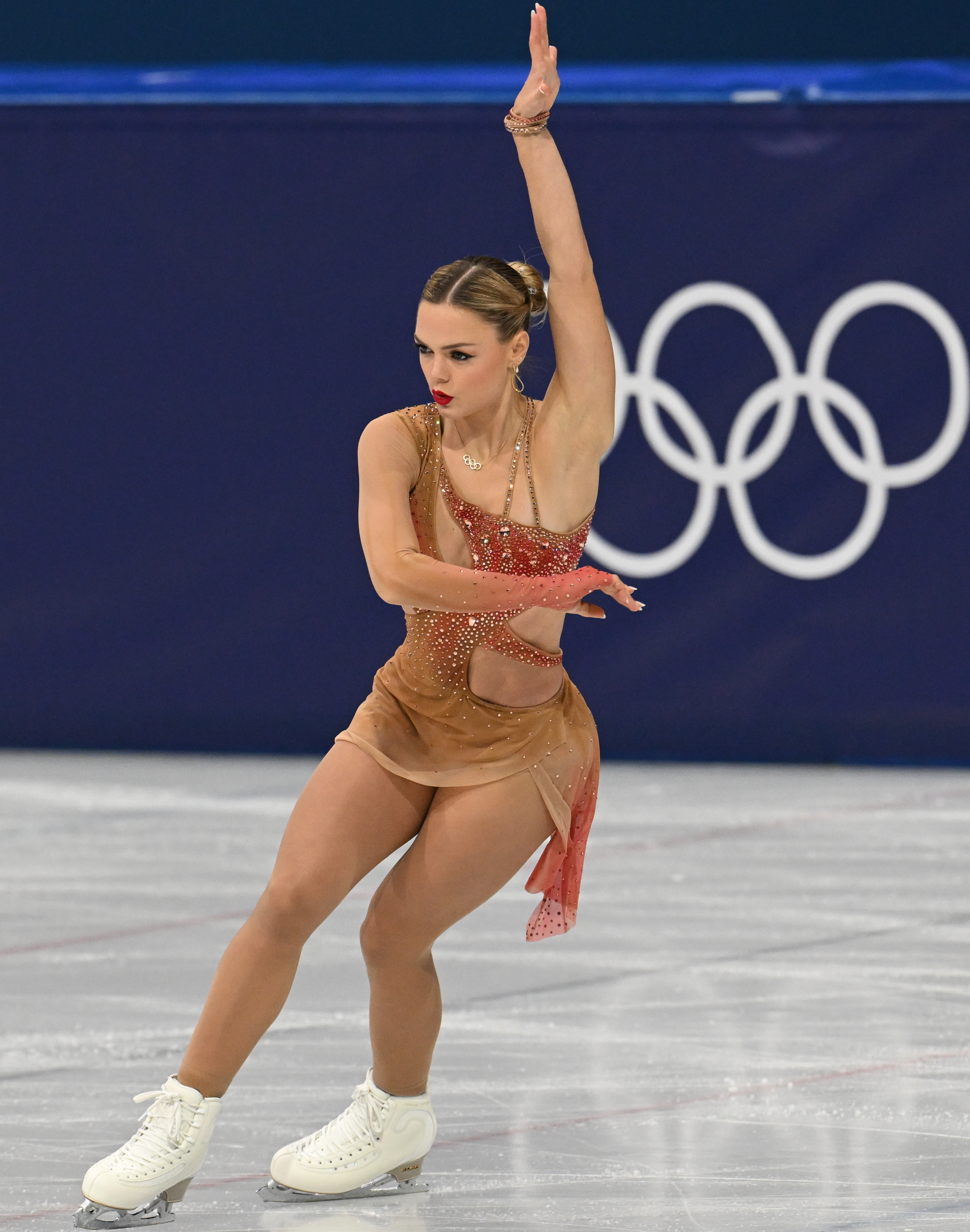
Hendrickx at the 2026 Winter Olympics

Hendrickx resumed training after her surgery. In an interview in early July, she said that while she was still avoiding one jump which she had often hurt her ankle performing, she was happy with the results of her surgery, and she was focusing on the upcoming ISU Skate to Milano competition, where she hoped to win a second Olympic quota for Belgium. At Skate to Milano, she won the bronze medal along with an Olympic quota. In an interview following the event, she said, "The goal for tonight to get my tickets for Milan, and I did it so now I'm very happy... I'm proud of myself because seven months ago, I had surgeries, so it wasn't easy and especially to come back in such a short time, I think it's just amazing and something to be proud of."

In November, Hendrickx captured the bronze medal at 2025 NHK Trophy. The skater stated she was disappointed with her short program, but that the fans kept her going. “I really want to work on my short program so that I have less stress and less fear,” said Hendrickx regarding preparation for her next event in Finland. “I really hope I can perform a good short there and that’s the main goal." At the 2025 Finlandia Trophy, Hendrickx ranked tenth out of eleven competitors in the short program following an error-filled performance. She then withdrew before the free skate, citing illness and a lack of proper nutrition leading up to the competition.

In January, Hendrickx competed at the 2026 European Championships in Sheffield, South Yorkshire, England. During the short program, she took a fall on a planned triple flip and lost points in grade of execution on her attempted triple Lutz-triple toe combination. She ultimately placed fifth in that segment but delivered an overall solid free skate where she placed third. During her free skate, she improvised a new jump layout after turning her opening triple-triple combination into a triple-double, to avoid repeating a double jump more times than the rules allowed. She moved up to second place overall to win the silver medal.

Following the event, she shared that she had been ill since the morning of the short program. Shortly before her free skate, she experienced a moment of panic described as a "total blackout" and began crying, which she blamed on her illness, stress, and a strained groin. Her brother helped calm her before she skated. "Now I am coughing a lot and have a stuffed nose," she said after the competition. "It’s not ideal. I hope my form at the Olympics will be better."

The following month, days before the start of the Winter Olympic Games, it was announced that Hendrickx had changed her Celine Dion short program song from "Ashes" to "I Surrender" due to copyright issues with the former song. Hendrickx expressed disappointment, saying that she had chosen the song four years earlier to skate to during her final Olympics. She also had a bone bruise in her ankle and initially doubted whether she would be able to compete at the Olympics. She ultimately decided to compete and struggled with her jumps during the practice sessions.

At the Olympics, Hendrickx finished in fourteenth place overall after placing seventh in the short program and fifteenth in the free skate. She said afterward that she was proud of her performance after her last-minute issues with her music and injury, though she expressed that she thought her scores were low. When asked whether she would retire, she said that she wanted to "let this achievement settle first and see how my body feels" before making a decision. Hendrickx ultimately opted to withdraw from the 2026 World Championships due to her ongoing injuries.

On June 24, 2026, Hendrickx announced her retirement from competitive skating, saying that while she still enjoyed competing, she did not feel physically able to continue doing so. She said of her retirement, "It is very difficult to officially close a very beautiful chapter." She also stated that she would continue to skate in shows.

== Dancing with the Stars ==
On November 3, 2026, it was announced that Hendrickx would be on Dancing with the Stars (Flemish edition) for season five. Her professional partner is Michele Cantanna.

== Programs ==
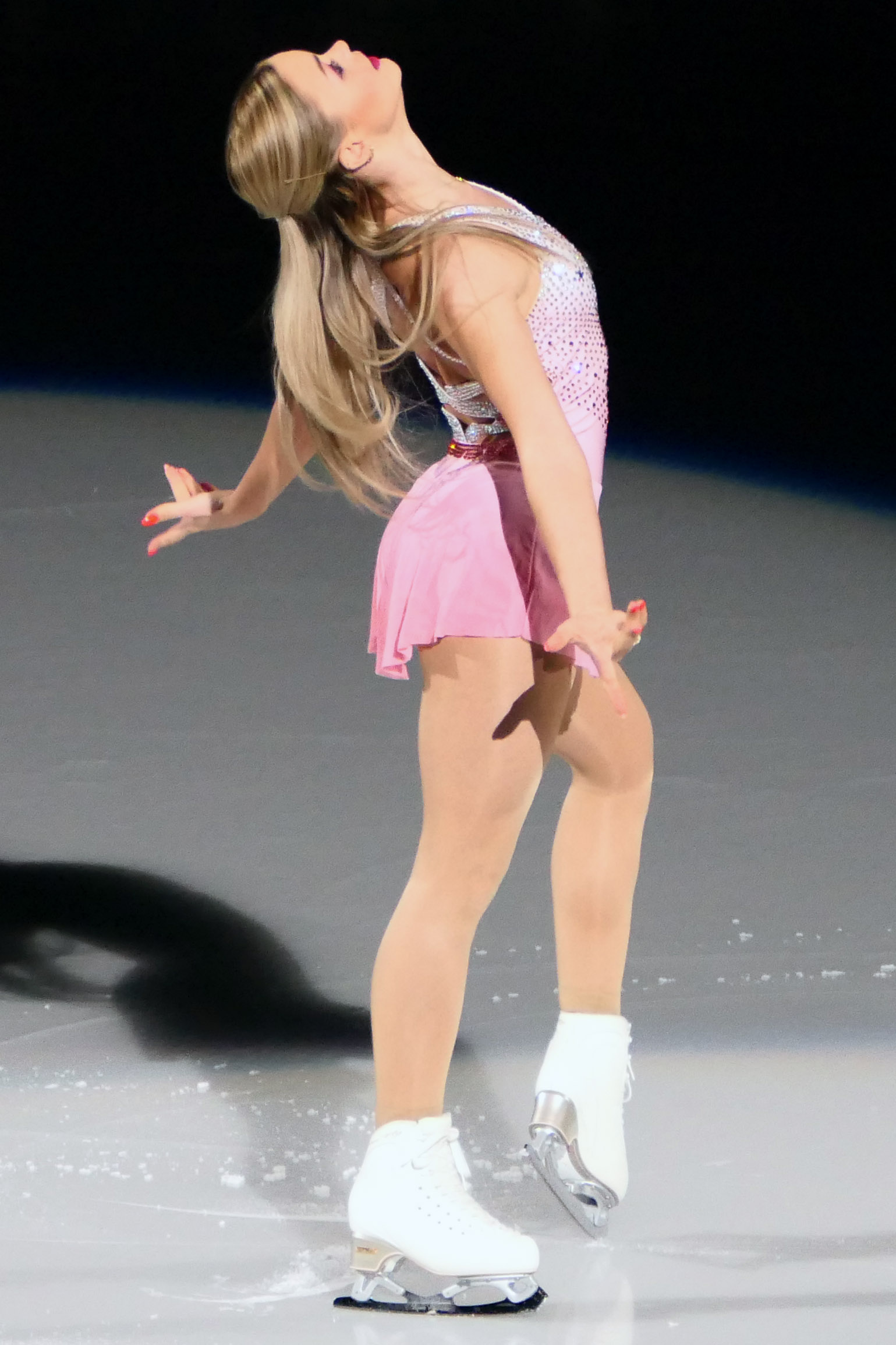
Hendrickx during the gala at the 2024 World Championships

Season	Short program	Free skating	Exhibition
2025–2026	I Surrender by Celine Dion choreo. by Adam Solya; Ashes (from Deadpool 2) by Petey Martin, Jordan Smith, & Tedd T. performed by Celine Dion choreo. by Adam Solya; Locura by INNA; Pinga by Sak Noel, Luka Caro, & Ruben Rider choreo. by Adam Solya	La alegría by Yasmin Levy; La alegría (Mahmun Orhan Remix) by Yasmin Levy & Scott Rill choreo. by Adam Solya	The Spot by JOA & Artbat
2024–2025	Black and Gold by Sam Sparro performed by Brenna Whitaker choreo. by Adam Solya	Believe by Cher performed by Madilyn Bailey; Fly Away From Sorrow by Karl Hugo choreo. by Adam Solya	New York by Paloma Faith; Heaven or Hell by Remo Forrer
2023–2024	Deep House Mix; Im Nin'alu by Asher Swissa & Mor Avraham ft. Narkis arranged by Karl Hugo; Living for Love by Madonna arranged by Karl Hugo choreo. by Adam Solya	Break My Soul (The Queens Remix) by Beyoncé & Madonna arranged by Karl Hugo choreo. by Adam Solya	Heaven or Hell by Remo Forrer; Miami Bitch by Legius & Gazell; Unicorn by Noa Kirel
2022–2023	Sí, Mamá by Inna; Mi Gente by J Balvin & Willy William performed by Beyoncé choreo. by Adam Solya	Heaven; Fallen Angel by Karl Hugo choreo. by Adam Solya; Poeta by Roby Facchinetti; Fallen Angel by Karl Hugo choreo. by Adam Solya; Poeta by Roby Facchinetti choreo. by Adam Solya	Loneliness by LONI
2021–2022	Caruso by Lucio Dalla performed by Lara Fabian choreo. by Adam Solya	The Mystic's Dream by Loreena McKennitt; Andromeda (Psytrance) by Dj Mistrionsx; Spirits by Chronis Taxidis; Lost Desert by Armand Franquelli & Ezequiel Asencio; Mizmar vs Violin by Hamada Enani; Arabian Night by Zwirek & Piotr Zwirko choreo. by Adam Solya	Circus by Britney Spears
2019–2021	It's All Coming Back to Me Now performed by Celine Dion choreo. by Adam Solya	Fever by Eddie Cooley, Otis Blackwell performed by Beyoncé choreo. by Adam Solya	
2018–2019	It's All Coming Back to Me Now performed by Celine Dion choreo. by Adam Solya	Diferente by Gotan Project choreo. by Adam Solya	Into You by Ariana Grande
2017–2018	Frozen by Madonna choreo. by Adam Solya	Diferente by Gotan Project choreo. by Adam Solya	New Rules by Dua Lipa
2016–2017	The Prayer performed by Celine Dion, Josh Groban choreo. by Adam Solya	Adagio performed by Lara Fabian choreo. by Sandy Suy	I Dreamed a Dream (from Les Misérables) by Claude-Michel Schönberg
2015–2016	Jalousie 'Tango Tzigane' by Jacob Gade; Gabriel's Oboe (from The Mission) by Ennio Morricone; Jalousie 'Tango Tzigane' by Jacob Gade choreo. by Sandy Suy	Adagio performed by Lara Fabian choreo. by Sandy Suy	
2014–2015	Soapdish by Alan Silvestri	The Prince of Egypt by Hans Zimmer	
2013–2014	Soapdish by Alan Silvestri	Malagueña by Ernesto Lecuona	
2012–2013	He's a Pirate (from Pirates of the Caribbean: Dead Man's Chest) by Klaus Badelt and Hans Zimmer performed by David Garrett	Malagueña by Ernesto Lecuona	Malagueña by Ernesto Lecuona; He's a Pirate (from Pirates of the Caribbean: Dead Man's Chest) by Klaus Badelt and Hans Zimmer performed by David Garrett
2010–2011		Overture (from Irma la Douce) by André Previn	

== Competitive highlights ==
- GP – Event of the ISU Grand Prix Series
- JGP – Event of the ISU Junior Grand Prix Series
- CS – Event of the ISU Challenger Series
- TBD – Assigned
- WD – Withdrew from competition
- C – Event was cancelled
- Medals at team events are awarded for the team results only. Individual placements at team events are listed in parentheses.

Competition placements at senior level
Season	2015–16	2016–17	2017–18	2018–19	2020–21	2021–22	2022–23	2023–24	2024–25	2025–26
Winter Olympics			16th			7th				14th
World Championships		15th	9th	12th	5th	2nd	3rd	4th		
European Championships		7th	5th		C	3rd	2nd	1st		2nd
Grand Prix Final							3rd	2nd		
Belgian Championships		1st	1st	1st	C	1st	1st			
GP Cup of China								3rd		
GP Finland				5th			2nd			WD
GP France							1st			
GP Italy						3rd				
GP NHK Trophy										3rd
GP Rostelecom Cup						5th				
GP Skate America				WD				1st		
CS Budapest Trophy					1st					
CS Finlandia Trophy		7th				4th				
CS Ice Challenge	WD									
CS Nebelhorn Trophy		7th		3rd			1st			
Challenge Cup		1st			1st					
Cup of Nice	7th	2nd								
Japan Open							3rd (2nd)	3rd (2nd)		
NRW Trophy		2nd								
Santa Claus Cup			2nd							
Shanghai Trophy									3rd	
Skate to Milano										3rd

Competition placements at junior level
Season	2013–14	2014–15	2015–16	2017–18
Belgian Championships	1st	1st		
JGP Austria				9th
JGP Germany		17th		
JGP Latvia			14th	
JGP Spain			11th	
Challenge Cup		3rd		
Coupe du Printemps	6th	3rd		
European Youth Olympic Festival		16th		

== Detailed results ==
ISU personal best scores in the +5/-5 GOE System
Segment	Type	Score	Event
Total	TSS	221.28	2023 Skate America
Short program	TSS	76.98	2024 World Championships
Short program	TES	41.65	2022 European Championships
Short program	PCS	36.00	2023 Skate America
Free skating	TSS	145.53	2021 Gran Premio d'Italia
Free skating	TES	74.91	2021 Gran Premio d'Italia
Free skating	PCS	72.94	2023 Skate America

ISU personal best scores in the +3/-3 GOE System
Segment	Type	Score	Event
Total	TSS	192.31	2018 World Championships
Short program	TSS	64.07	2018 World Championships
Short program	TES	35.41	2018 World Championships
Short program	PCS	28.66	2018 World Championships
Free skating	TSS	128.24	2018 World Championships
Free skating	TES	65.25	2018 World Championships
Free skating	PCS	62.99	2018 World Championships

- Small medals for the short program and free skating are only awarded at ISU Championships.
- Medals at team events are awarded for the team results only. Individual placements at team events are listed in parentheses.

=== Senior level ===
Results in the 2015–16 season
Date	Event	SP		FS		Total	
Date	Event	P	Score	P	Score	P	Score
Oct 14–18, 2015	(France) 2015 Cup of Nice	6	49.12	9	80.98	7	130.10

Results in the 2016–17 season
Date	Event	SP		FS		Total	
Date	Event	P	Score	P	Score	P	Score
Sep 22–24, 2016	(Germany) 2016 CS Nebelhorn Trophy	10	45.36	7	94.07	7	139.43
Oct 6–10, 2016	(Finland) 2016 CS Finlandia Trophy	8	48.81	6	99.35	7	148.16
Oct 19–23, 2016	(France) 2015 Cup of Nice	2	57.88	2	109.19	2	167.07
Nov 18–19, 2016	(Belgium) 2017 Belgian Championships	1	56.63	1	120.56	1	177.19
Nov 30 – Dec 4, 2016	(Germany) 2017 NRW Trophy	2	53.48	2	06.60	2	160.08
Jan 25–29, 2017	(Czech Republic) 2017 European Championships	11	55.41	7	117.30	7	172.71
Feb 23–26, 2017	(Netherlands) 2017 International Challenge Cup	1	62.54	1	115.40	1	177.94
Mar 29 – Apr 2, 2017	(Finland) 2017 World Championships	17	57.54	14	115.28	15	172.82

Results in the 2017–18 season
Date	Event	SP		FS		Total	
Date	Event	P	Score	P	Score	P	Score
Dec 1–2, 2017	(Belgium) 2018 Belgian Championships	1	56.59	1	115.03	1	171.62
Dec 4–10, 2017	(Hungary) 2017 Santa Claus Cup	3	54.18	2	106.42	2	160.60
Jan 15–21, 2018	(Russia) 2018 European Championships	8	55.13	5	121.78	5	176.91
Feb 14–25, 2018	(South Korea) 2018 Winter Olympics	20	55.16	14	116.72	16	171.98
Mar 19–25, 2018	(Italy) 2018 World Championships	10	64.07	6	128.24	9	193.31

Results in the 2018–19 season
Date	Event	SP		FS		Total	
Date	Event	P	Score	P	Score	P	Score
Sep 26–29, 2018	(Germany) 2018 CS Nebelhorn Trophy	2	71.50	3	132.66	3	204.16
Oct 19–21, 2018	(United States) 2018 Skate America	10	54.13	–	–	–	WD
Nov 3–4, 2018	(Finland) 2018 Grand Prix of Helsinki	3	63.17	4	128.05	5	191.22
Nov 16–17, 2018	(Belgium) 2019 Belgian Championships	1	61.48	1	122.48	1	183.96
Mar 18–24, 2019	(Japan) 2019 World Championships	13	62.60	11	123.69	12	186.29

Results in the 2020–21 season
Date	Event	SP		FS		Total	
Date	Event	P	Score	P	Score	P	Score
Oct 15–17, 2020	(Hungary) 2020 CS Budapest Trophy	1	72.18	1	126.69	1	198.87
Feb 26–28, 2021	(Netherlands) 2021 International Challenge Cup	1	69.77	1	134.91	1	204.68
Mar 22–28, 2021	(Sweden) 2021 World Championships	10	67.28	4	141.16	5	208.44

Results in the 2021–22 season
Date	Event	SP		FS		Total	
Date	Event	P	Score	P	Score	P	Score
Oct 7–10, 2021	(Finland) 2021 CS Finlandia Trophy	5	68.82	3	143.25	4	212.07
Nov 5–7, 2021	(Italy) 2021 Gran Premio d'Italia	1	73.52	3	145.53	3	219.05
Nov 19–20, 2021	(Belgium) 2022 Belgian Championships	1	71.49	1	149.55	1	229.04
Nov 26–28, 2021	(Russia) 2021 Rostelecom Cup	6	64.44	5	139.25	5	203.69
Jan 10–16, 2022	(Estonia) 2022 European Championships	1	76.25	4	131.72	3	207.97
Feb 15–17, 2022	(China) 2022 Winter Olympics	6	70.09	8	136.70	7	206.79
Mar 21–27, 2022	(France) 2022 World Championships	2	75.00	2	142.70	2	217.70

Results in the 2022–23 season
Date	Event	SP		FS		Total	
Date	Event	P	Score	P	Score	P	Score
Sep 21–24, 2022	(Germany) 2022 CS Nebelhorn Trophy	1	76.19	2	131.86	1	208.05
Oct 8, 2022	2022 Japan Open	—N/a	—N/a	2	132.53	3	—N/a
Nov 4–6, 2022	2022 Grand Prix de France	1	72.75	1	143.59	1	216.34
Nov 18–19, 2022	(Belgium) 2023 Belgian Championships	1	77.95	1	145.55	1	223.50
Nov 25–27, 2022	(Finland) 2022 Grand Prix of Espoo	1	74.88	3	129.03	2	203.91
Dec 8–11, 2022	(Italy) 2022–23 Grand Prix Final	3	74.24	4	122.11	3	196.35
Jan 25–29, 2023	(Finland) 2023 European Championships	2	67.85	3	125.63	2	193.48
Mar 22–26, 2023	(Japan) 2023 World Championships	5	71.94	4	138.48	3	210.42

Results in the 2023–24 season
Date	Event	SP		FS		Total	
Date	Event	P	Score	P	Score	P	Score
Oct 7, 2023	2023 Japan Open	—N/a	—N/a	2	140.31	3	—N/a
Oct 20–22, 2023	(United States) 2023 Skate America	1	75.92	1	145.36	1	221.38
Nov 10–12, 2023	2023 Cup of China	1	70.65	3	130.84	3	201.49
Dec 7–10, 2023	(China) 2023–24 Grand Prix Final	2	73.25	4	130.11	2	203.36
Jan 10–14, 2024	(Lithuania) 2024 European Championships	1	74.66	1	138.59	1	213.25
Mar 18–24, 2024	(Canada) 2024 World Championships	1	76.98	8	123.27	4	200.25

Results in the 2024–25 season
Date	Event	SP		FS		Total	
Date	Event	P	Score	P	Score	P	Score
Oct 3–5, 2024	(China) 2024 Shanghai Trophy	3	65.74	4	114.04	3	179.78

Results in the 2025–26 season
Date	Event	SP		FS		Total	
Date	Event	P	Score	P	Score	P	Score
Sep 18–21, 2025	(China) 2025 ISU Skate to Milano	3	66.92	3	138.04	3	204.96
Nov 7–9, 2025	(Japan) 2025 NHK Trophy	4	62.45	2	136.52	3	198.97
Nov 21–23, 2025	(Finland) 2025 Finlandia Trophy	10	54.75	–	–	–	WD
Jan 13–18, 2026	(United Kingdom) 2026 European Championships	5	63.34	3	127.92	2	191.26
Feb 17–19, 2026	(Italy) 2026 Winter Olympics	7	70.93	15	128.72	14	199.65

=== Junior results ===
2017–18 season
Date	Event	SP	FS	Total
30 Aug. – 2 Sept. 2017	2017 JGP Austria	8; 51.77	11; 83.77	9; 135.54
2015–16 season
Date	Event	SP	FS	Total
30 Sept. – 4 Oct. 2015	2015 JGP Spain	12; 46.58	10; 91.81	11; 138.39
26–30 August 2015	2015 JGP Latvia	8; 49.16	15; 75.27	14; 124.43
2014–15 season
Date	Event	SP	FS	Total
13–15 March 2015	2015 Coupe du Printemps	2; 41.20	3; 76.52	3; 117.72
19–22 February 2015	2015 International Challenge Cup	5; 39.65	3; 79.66	3; 119.31
25–30 January 2015	2015 EYOF	16; 33.97	13; 64.58	16; 98.55
21–22 November 2014	2015 Belgian Junior Championships	1; 40.88	1; 65.82	1; 106.70
1–4 October 2014	2014 JGP Germany	20; 32.36	14; 68.87	17; 101.23
2013–14 season
Date	Event	SP	FS	Total
14–16 March 2014	2014 Coupe du Printemps	8; 34.35	5; 67.13	6; 101.48
