= Belgian Figure Skating Championships =

Recurring national figure skating competition

- Status: Active
- Genre: National championships
- Frequency: Annual
- Country: Belgium
- Organizer: Royal Belgian Figure Skating Federation

The Belgian Figure Skating Championships (Dutch: Belgisch kampioenschap kunstschaatsen; French: Championnats de Belgique de patinage artistique) are an annual figure skating competition organized by the Royal Belgian Figure Skating Federation (Dutch: Koninklijke Belgische Kunstschaatsen Federatie; French: Fédération Royale Belge de Patinage Artistique) to crown the national champions of Belgium. Championships were held as early as 1921, and frequently consisted of events in speed skating, figure skating, and ice hockey.

In 1929, Olga Schiffelers was identified as a ten-time Belgian champion.

The decision of the Belgian Winter Sports Federation to hold the 1948 Belgian Championships in Tilburg, in the Netherlands, was seen as a bad decision, since the facilities in Antwerp, Brussels, and Liège were of better size and quality. In protest, no skaters from Antwerp – including Pierre Baugniet, Fernand Leemans, or Micheline Lannoy – attended the competition.

Guest skaters from neighboring countries – such as Great Britain, Luxembourg, and the Netherlands – have often participated in the Belgian Championships. While a guest skater from another country may be able to finish in first place and win the gold medal in a Belgian event, they do not receive the title of Belgian Champion; that honor goes to the highest-scoring Belgian skater. Medals are awarded in men's and women's singles at the senior and junior levels, although each discipline may not necessarily be held every year due to a lack of participants. No competition was held in 2021 due to the COVID-19 pandemic.

== Senior medalists ==
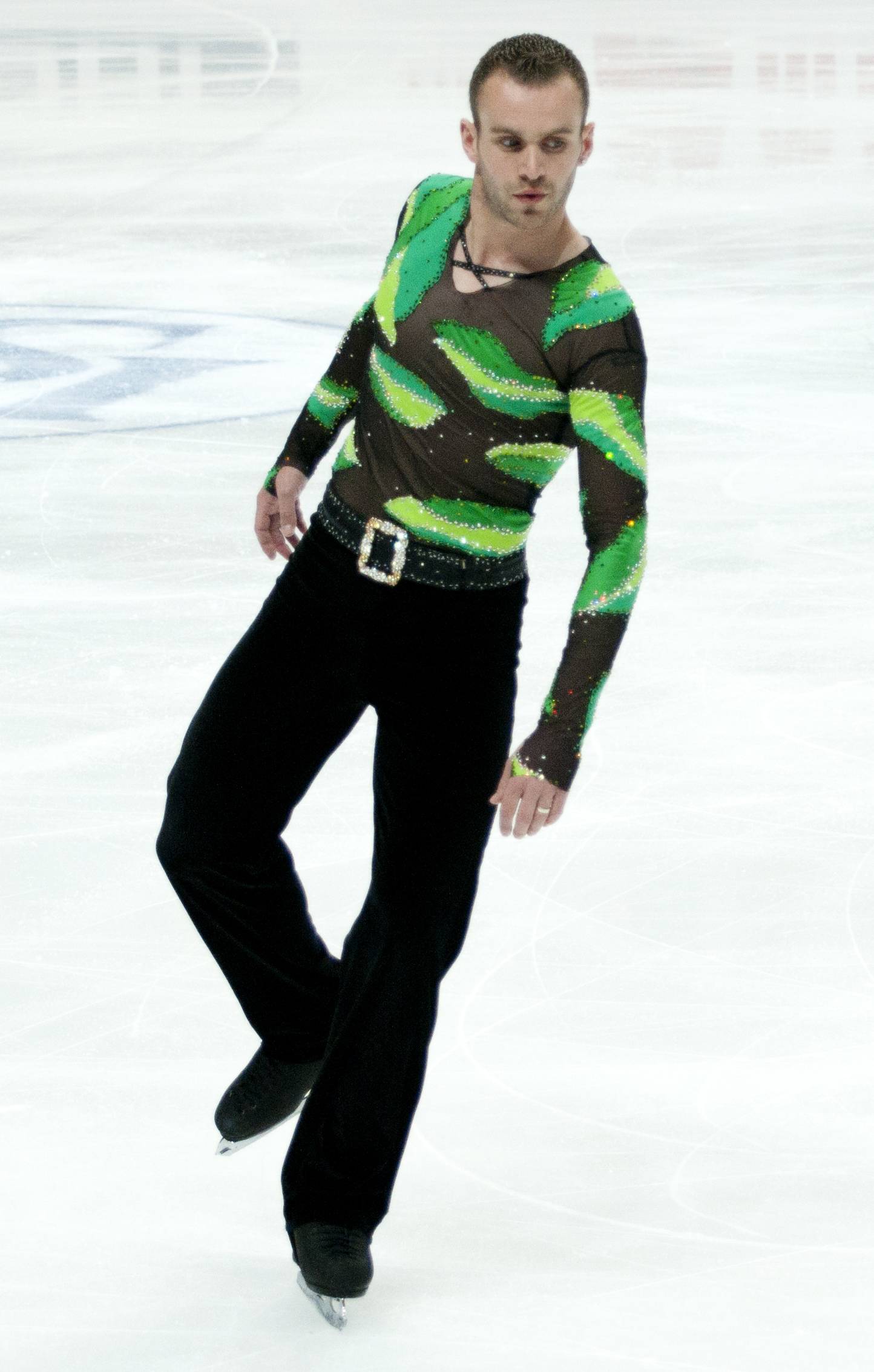
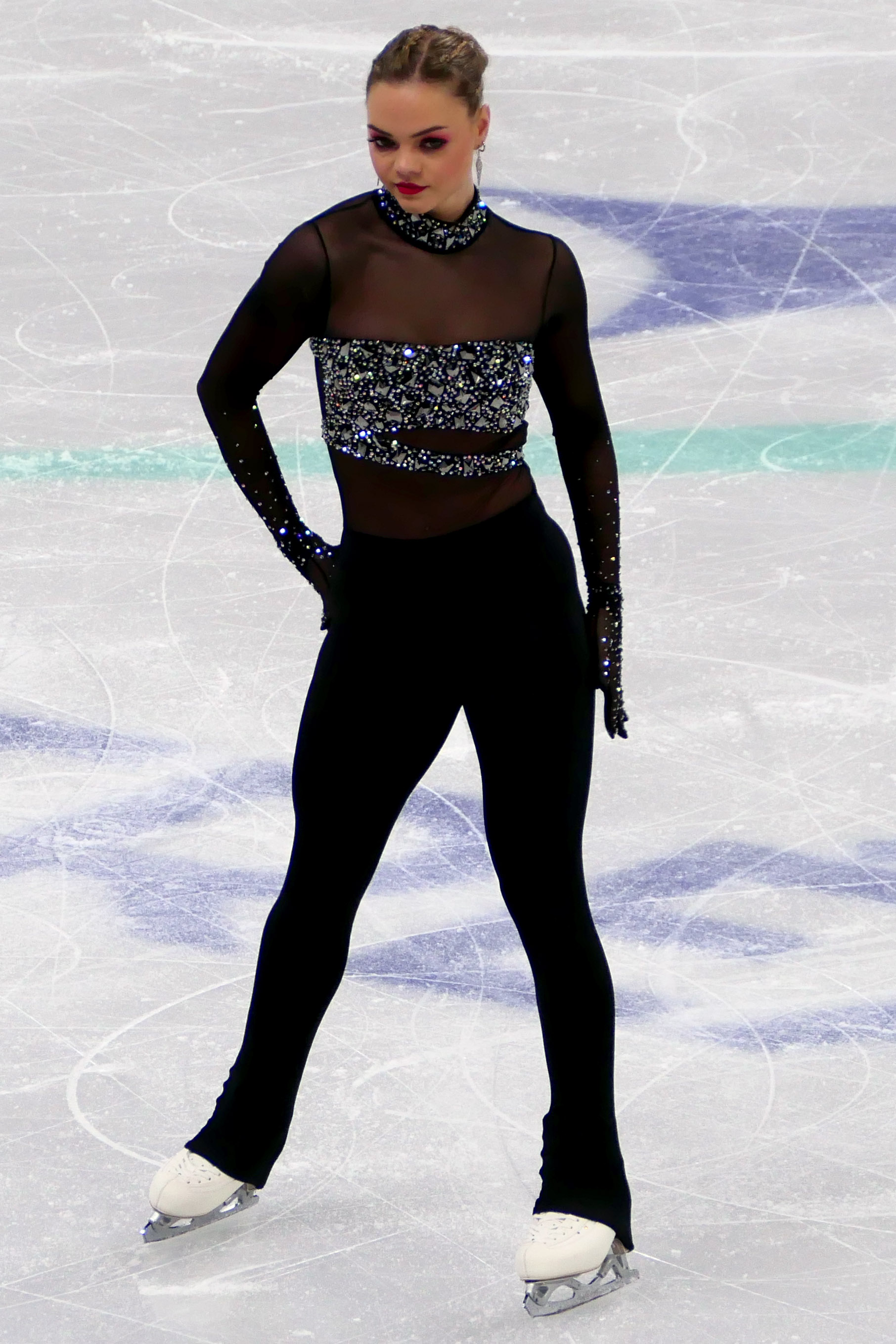
From left to right: Kevin van der Perren, eight-time Belgian champion in men's singles; and Loena Hendrickx, five-time Belgian champion in women's singles

=== Men's singles ===
Senior men's event medalists
Year	Location	Gold	Silver	Bronze	Ref.
1921	Antwerp	Georges Wagemans	Freddy Mésot	M. Morren	
1922	Antwerp	Freddy Mésot	(No records found)		
1923	Antwerp	Freddy Mésot	No other competitors		
1924	Antwerp	Freddy Mésot	Robert Van Zeebroeck	No other competitors	
1925	Antwerp	Robert Van Zeebroeck	(No records found)		
1926	Antwerp	Robert Van Zeebroeck	(No records found)		
1927	Antwerp				
1928	Antwerp	Robert Van Zeebroeck	Gaston Werts	No other competitors	
1929–34	(No records found)				
1935	Brussels	Robert Van Zeebroeck	Freddy Mésot	No other competitors	
1936	Brussels	Robert Van Zeebroeck	No other competitors		
1937	Brussels	Freddy Mésot	No other competitors		
1938	Brussels	René Lamot (Note: René Lamot did not achieve the minimum required score to be named the Belgian champion.)	No other competitors		
1939	Brussels	No men's competitors			
1940	Antwerp	Pierre Baugniet	No other competitors		
1941	Brussels	Pierre Baugniet	Edmond Verbustel	No other competitors	
1942	Antwerp	Pierre Baugniet	Edmond Verbustel	No other competitors	
1943	Antwerp	Pierre Baugniet	Edmond Verbustel	No other competitors	
1944	Antwerp	Pierre Baugniet	Fernand Leemans	No other competitors	
1945	(No records found)				
1946	Antwerp	Fernand Leemans (Note: Neither Fernand Leemans nor José Godfrain achieved the minimum required score to be named the Belgian champion.)	José Godfrain	No other competitors	
1947	Brussels	Fernand Leemans	No other competitors		
1948	(Netherlands) Tilburg	Jacques Renard	(No records found)		
1949	Brussels	Jacques Renard	Edmond Verbustel	No other competitors	
1950	Antwerp	Edmond Verbustel	Jacques Renard	No other competitors	
1951	Liège	Henri Stein (Note: Henri Stein did not achieve the minimum required score to be named the Belgian champion.)	No other competitors		
1952	Brussels	Henri Stein	No other competitors		
1953					
1954–55	Antwerp	No men's competitors			
1956	Antwerp				
1957–60	Antwerp	No men's competitors			
1961	Antwerp				
1962	Antwerp				
1963–64	Antwerp	No men's competitors			
1965	Antwerp				
1966	Antwerp				
1967–68	Antwerp	No men's competitors			
1969					
1970–74	No men's competitors				
1975					
1976					
1979	Jambes				
1980					
1981	Liège	Eric Krol	No other competitors		
1982	Leuven	Eric Krol	No other competitors		
1983					
1984–86	No men's competitors				
1987					
1988					
1989	Deurne	Alexandre Geers	No other competitors		
1990					
1991					
1992					
1993					
1994					
1995					
1996					
1997	Lommel				
1998					
1999	Liedekerke		Kevin van der Perren		
2000	Brussels	Kevin van der Perren			
2001	Torhout	Kevin van der Perren	Nick Wyns	No other competitors	
2002		No men's competitors			
2003	Leuven	Kevin van der Perren	No other competitors		
2004	Deurne	Kevin van der Perren	No other competitors		
2005–06	No men's competitors				
2007	Hasselt	Kevin van der Perren	No other competitors		
2008	Hasselt	(United Kingdom) Elliot Hilton (Great Britain) (Note: There was no Belgian champion in the men's event, because all of the competitors were guest skaters.)	(United Kingdom) David Richardson (Great Britain)	Taras Rajec (Slovakia)	
2009	Lommel	(United Kingdom) Nick Rigby (Great Britain) (Note: There was no Belgian champion in the men's event, because Nick Rigby, the only competitor, was a guest skater from Great Britain.)	No other competitors		
2010	Liège	Manuel Koll (Austria) (Note: Jorik Hendrickx was named the Belgian champion, because Manuel Koll, the first-place finisher, was a guest skater from Austria.)	Jorik Hendrickx	Ruben Blommaert	
2011	Hasselt	Kevin van der Perren	Jorik Hendrickx	No other competitors	
2012	Deurne	Kevin van der Perren	Jorik Hendrickx	No other competitors	
2013–15	No men's competitors				
2016	Maaseik	Jorik Hendrickx	No other competitors		
2017	Lommel	Jorik Hendrickx	No other competitors		
2018–20	No men's competitors				
2021	Mechelen	Competition cancelled due to the COVID-19 pandemic			
2022–23	No men's competitors				
2024	Mechelen	Christopher Lison	No other competitors		
2025–26	No men's competitors				

=== Women's singles ===
Senior women's event medalists
Year	Location	Gold	Silver	Bronze	Ref.
1921	Antwerp	Gérardine Herbos	Olga Schiffelers	Mlle Elsen	
1922	Antwerp	Olga Schiffelers	(No records found)		
1923	Antwerp	Olga Schiffelers	No other competitors		
1924	Antwerp	Olga Schiffelers	Josy Van Leberghe	No other competitors	
1925	Antwerp	Josy Van Leberghe	(No records found)		
1926	Antwerp	Olga Schiffelers	(No records found)		
1927	Antwerp				
1928	Antwerp	Yvonne de Ligne	Josy Van Leberghe	No other competitors	
1929–34	(No records found)				
1935	Brussels	Yvonne de Ligne	No other competitors		
1936	Brussels	Liselotte Landbeck	No other competitors		
1937	Brussels	Liselotte Landbeck	No other competitors		
1938	Brussels	No women's competitors			
1939	Brussels	Betty Hendrickx	No other competitors		
1940	Antwerp	Betty Hendrickx	Micheline Lannoy	No other competitors	
1941	Brussels	Micheline Lannoy	Blanche Delcourt	No other competitors	
1942	Antwerp	Betty Hendrickx	Blanche Delcourt	No other competitors	
1943	Antwerp	Betty Hendrickx	Micheline Lannoy	Blanche Delcourt	
1944	Antwerp	Micheline Lannoy	Blanche Delcourt	Micheline Flon	
1945	(No records found)				
1946	Antwerp	Micheline Lannoy	Simone Clinckers	Liliane D'Heere	
1947	Brussels	Simone Clinckers	No other competitors		
1948	(Netherlands) Tilburg	Suzanne Gheldorf	(No records found)		
1949	Brussels	Suzanne Gheldorf	Lucienne Faut	No other competitors	
1950	Antwerp	Liliane de Becker	Suzanne Gheldorf	No other competitors	
1951	Liège	Liliane de Becker	Nicole Van den Berghe	No other competitors	
1952	Brussels	Liliane de Becker	Nicole Van den Berghe	No other competitors	
1953		Liliane de Becker			
1954	Antwerp	Liliane de Becker	No other competitors		
1955	Antwerp	Juliette Moenjaert	(No records found)		
1956	Antwerp	Yvette Busieau			
1957	Antwerp	Yvette Busieau	(No records found)		
1958	Antwerp	Yvette Busieau	No other competitors		
1959	Antwerp	Yvette Busieau	No other competitors		
1960	Antwerp	Yvette Busieau			
1961	Antwerp	Christine Van de Put			
1962	Antwerp				
1963	Antwerp	Christine Van de Put	Marguerite Verboven	No other competitors	
1964	Antwerp	Christine Van de Put			
1965	Antwerp				
1966	Antwerp				
1967	Antwerp	Marion Batavier	Monique Cauberghs	No other competitors	
1968	Antwerp	Marion Batavier	Monique Cauberghs & Gerda Severeyns (tied)	No other competitors	
1969					
1970	Antwerp	Gerda Severeyns (Note: Neither Gerda Severeyns nor Nicole Sarens achieved the minimum required score to be named the Belgian champion.)	Nicole Sarens	No other competitors	
1971	Liège	Gerda Severeyns	Jacqueline Deflandre	Nicole Sarens	
1972	Liège	No women's champion			
1973	Liège	Carine Henrotte (Note: None of the competitors in the women's event achieved the minimum required score to be named the Belgian champion.)	Francoise Lambrechts	Jacqueline Deflandre	
1974	Deurne	Carine Henrotte	(No records found)		
1975					
1976	Liège	Liesbeth Berghmans			
1977					
1978					
1979	Jambes				
1980		Editha Dotson			
1981	Liège	Editha Dotson	Mlle Schoumacker	No other competitors	
1982	Leuven	Katrien Pauwels	Linda Van Troyen	Rosy Vanhove	
1983		Judith De Bie			
1984	Wevelgem	Katrien Pauwels	Judith De Bie	Linda Van Troyen	
1985	Oud-Heverlee	Katrien Pauwels	Ingrid Eeckelaars	Nancy Sohie	
1986	Liège	Katrien Pauwels	Dominique Morelli	Sandrine Goes	
1987		Katrien Pauwels			
1988		Katrien Pauwels			
1989	Deurne	Sandy Suy	Sandrine Goes	Carine Herrijgers	
1990					
1991					
1992					
1993					
1994					
1995					
1996					
1997	Lommel		Ellen Mareels		
1998			Ellen Mareels	Dorothée Derroitte	
1999	Liedekerke	Dorothée Derroitte	Ellen Mareels		
2000	Brussels	Ellen Mareels	Natalie Hoste		
2001	Torhout	Ellen Mareels	Sara Falotico	Leen Vermeiren	
2002		Sara Falotico	Ellen Mareels	Fauve Snauwaert	
2003	Leuven	Ellen Mareels	Sara Falotico	Dorothée Derroitte	
2004	Deurne	Sara Falotico	Ellen Mareels	Isabelle Pieman	
2005	Lommel	Sara Falotico	Dorothée Derroitte	Isabelle Pieman	
2006	Leuven	Kirsten Verbist	Barbara Klerk	No other competitors	
2007	Hasselt	Isabelle Pieman	(United Kingdom) Jenna McCorkell (Great Britain)	Kirsten Verbist	
2008	Hasselt	(United Kingdom) Jenna McCorkell (Great Britain) (Note: Barbara Klerk was named the Belgian champion, because Jenna McCorkell, the first-place finisher, was a guest skater from Great Britain.)	Barbara Klerk	Isabelle Pieman	
2009	Lommel	Barbara Klerk	(United Kingdom) Karly Robertson (Great Britain)	Isabelle Pieman	
2010	Liège	Isabelle Pieman	Kaat Van Daele	Christina Grill (Austria)	
2011	Hasselt	Ira Vannut	Kaat Van Daele	Laura Lougsami	
2012	Deurne	Isabelle Pieman	Kaat Van Daele	No other competitors	
2013	Deurne	Kaat Van Daele	Isabelle Pieman	Kim Bell (Netherlands)	
2014	Liège	Kaat Van Daele	Isabelle Pieman	Eva Lim (Netherlands)	
2015	Lommel	Kaat Van Daele	No other competitors		
2016	Maaseik	No women's competitors			
2017	Lommel	Loena Hendrickx	Charlotte Van Der Sarren	No other competitors	
2018	Liedekerke	Loena Hendrickx	Anneliese Van Houdt	No other competitors	
2019	Leuven	Loena Hendrickx	Charlotte Van Der Sarren	Loïs Arickx	
2020	Wilrijk	Naomi Mugnier	Jade Hovine	No other competitors	
2021	Mechelen	Competition cancelled due to the COVID-19 pandemic			
2022	Leuven	Loena Hendrickx	Jade Hovine	No other competitors	
2023	Mechelen	Loena Hendrickx	Jade Hovine	No other competitors	
2024	Mechelen	Nina Pinzarrone	Jade Hovine	No other competitors	
2025	Hasselt	Nina Pinzarrone	Danielle Verbinnen	Shadé de Brauwer	
2026	Deurne	Nina Pinzarrone	No other competitors		

=== Pairs ===
Senior pairs' event medalists
Year	Location	Gold	Silver	Bronze	Ref.
1921	Antwerp				
1922	Antwerp				
1923–24	Antwerp	No pairs competitors			
1925	Antwerp	Mlle L.M. Lauwers; M. Kreitz	No other competitors		
1926	Antwerp				
1927	Antwerp	Josy Van Leberghe; Robert Van Zeebroeck			
1928	Antwerp	Josy Van Leberghe; Robert Van Zeebroeck	No other competitors		
1929–34	(No records found)				
1935					
1936	Brussels	Louise Contamine; Robert Verdun	No other competitors		
1937–38	Brussels	No pairs competitors			
1939	Antwerp				
1940	Antwerp	Suzanne Diskeuve; Edmond Verbustel	No other competitors		
1941	Brussels	Suzanne Diskeuve; Edmond Verbustel	No other competitors		
1942					
1943	Antwerp	Suzanne Diskeuve; Edmond Verbustel	Micheline Lannoy; Pierre Baugniet	Suzanne Gheldorf; Jacques Renard	
1944	Antwerp	Micheline Lannoy; Pierre Baugniet	Suzanne Diskeuve; Edmond Verbustel	No other competitors	
1945		Micheline Lannoy; Pierre Baugniet			
1946	Antwerp	Micheline Lannoy; Pierre Baugniet	No other competitors		
1947	Antwerp	Micheline Lannoy; Pierre Baugniet	Suzanne Diskeuve; Edmond Verbustel	No other competitors	
1948	(Netherlands) Tilburg	Suzanne Gheldorf; Jacques Renard	(No records found)		
1949	Brussels	Suzanne Gheldorf; Jacques Renard	No other competitors		
1950	Liège	Suzanne Gheldorf; Jacques Renard	No other competitors		
1951					
1952					
1953					
1954	Antwerp	Charlotte Michiels; Gaston Van Ghelder	No other competitors		
1973	Liège	Patricia Adam; Jean-Claude Dethrez; (Note: Patricia Adam and Jean-Claude Dethrez did not achieve the minimum required score to be named the Belgian champions.)	No other competitors		
1974	Deurne	Patricia Adam; Jean-Claude Dethrez	(No records found)		

=== Ice dance ===
Senior ice dance (waltzing) event medalists
Year	Location	Gold	Silver	Bronze	Ref.
1927	Antwerp	Olga Schiffelers; Robert Van Zeebroeck	Yvonne de Ligne; Robert Verdun	Louise Contamine; Félix Gauterboren	
1974	Deurne	Carinne Romme; Jean de Bruyne	(No records found)		

== Junior medalists ==
While junior-level championships were held in Belgium prior to 2007, this is earliest for which full results have been documented.

=== Men's singles ===
Junior men's event medalists
Year	Location	Gold	Silver	Bronze	Ref.
2007	Hasselt	Ruben Blommaert	Christopher Cleyman	No other competitors	
2008	Hasselt	Ruben Blommaert	Jorik Hendrickx	Jelle Butzen	
2009	Lommel	Jorik Hendrickx	Ruben Blommaert	Jelle Butzen	
2010	Liège	Jonas Sleven	No other competitors		
2011	Hasselt	Jerry Hilgert (Luxembourg) (Note: There was no Belgian junior champion in the men's event, because Jerry Hilgert, the only competitor, was a guest skater from Luxembourg.)	No other competitors		
2012	Deurne	Jerry Hilgert (Luxembourg)	No other competitors		
2013	Deurne	No junior men's competitors			
2014	Liège	Timothée Manand	No other competitors		
2015	Lommel	Timothée Manand	Bob Rasschaert	No other competitors	
2016	Maaseik	Timothée Manand	Bob Rasschaert	No other competitors	
2017	Lommel	Bob Rasschaert	Jeroen Schroyen	No other competitors	
2018	Liedekerke	Bob Rasschaert	No other competitors		
2019	Leuven	Christopher Lison	No other competitors		
2020	Wilrijk	Christopher Lison	No other competitors		
2021	Mechelen	Competition cancelled due to the COVID-19 pandemic			
2022	Leuven	No junior men's competitors			
2023	Mechelen	Denis Krouglov	No other competitors		
2024	Mechelen	Denis Krouglov	Dimitri Christakis	Leander Gabriel	
2025	Hasselt	Denis Krouglov	Dimitri Christakis	Leander Gabriel	
2026	Deurne	Denis Krouglov	Mohammed Aamara	No other competitors	

=== Women's singles ===
Junior women's event medalists
Year	Location	Gold	Silver	Bronze	Ref.
2007	Hasselt	Laurie Lougsami	Kaat Van Daele	Shana De Vetter	
2008	Hasselt	Laurie Lougsami	Kaat Van Daele	Amelie Pierre	
2009	Lommel	Ira Vannut	(United Kingdom) Laura Kean (Great Britain)	Laurie Lougsami	
2010	Liège	Ira Vannut	Ines Wohlmuth (Austria)	Amelie Pierre	
2011	Hasselt	Eline Anthonissen	Anaïs Claes	Michelle Couwenberg (Netherlands)	
2012	Deurne	Eline Anthonissen	Ceciliane Mei Ling Hartmann (Singapore)	Anaïs Claes	
2013	Deurne	Anne-Sophie Goossens (Netherlands) (Note: Anaïs Claes was named the Belgian junior champion, because Anne-Sophie Goossens, the first-place finisher, was a guest skater from the Netherlands.)	Anaïs Claes	Lieselotte Swerts	
2014	Liège	Loena Hendrickx	Lieselotte Swerts	Kirana Noerens	
2015	Lommel	Loena Hendrickx	Lieselotte Swerts	Kirana Noerens	
2016	Maaseik	Charlotte Van Der Sarren	Lisa Van Genck	Loïs Arickx	
2017	Lommel	Lisa Van Genck	Robyn Ravyts	Laura Balanean	
2018	Liedekerke	Laura Balanean	Lisa Van Genck	Loïs Arickx	
2019	Leuven	Jade Hovine	Amber De Maesschalck	Vicky Jansen	
2020	Wilrijk	Nina Pinzarrone	Giulia Castorini	Caroline Smans	
2021	Mechelen	Competition cancelled due to the COVID-19 pandemic			
2022	Leuven	Nina Pinzarrone	Giulia Castorini	Maite Van Mulders	
2023	Mechelen	Giulia Castorini	Charlotte Jennes	Jolien Jennes	
2024	Mechelen	Charlotte Jennes	Danielle Verbinnen	Jolien Jennes	
2025	Hasselt	Lilou Remeysen	Ilona van Steenberghe	Charlotte Jennes	
2026	Deurne	Lilou Remeysen	Ilona van Steenberghe	Nena Bastianen	
