= Verbist =

Verbist is a surname. Notable people with the surname include:

- Bram Verbist (born 1983), Belgian footballer
- Christopher Verbist (born 1991), Belgian footballer
- Evert Verbist (born 1984), Belgian cyclist
- Kirsten Verbist (born 1987), Belgian figure skater
- Theophiel Verbist (1823–1868), Belgian Roman Catholic priest
