= Jade Hovine =

French-Belgian figure skater (born 2004)

Personal information
- Born: 11 June 2004 (age 22) Lille, France
- Home town: Vaulx, Tournai, Belgium
- Height: 1.60 m (5 ft 3 in)

Figure skating career
- Country: Belgium
- Discipline: Women's singles
- Coach: Cédric Tour; Rodolphe Maréchal
Medal record
Belgian Championships
Silver medal – second place	2020 Wilrijk	Singles
Silver medal – second place	2022 Leuven	Singles
Silver medal – second place	2023 Mechelen	Singles
Silver medal – second place	2024 Mechelen	Singles

Jade Hovine (born 11 June 2004) is a French-Belgian figure skater. She is the 2022 NRW Trophy champion and a four-time Belgian national silver medalist (2020, 2022–2024). She has represented Belgium at four senior level ISU Championships.

== Personal life ==
Hovine was born in Lille, France on June 11, 2004, and grew up in Vaulx, Tournai. She lives in Nice, where she studies law at Côte d'Azur University.

== Career ==
=== Early career ===
Hovine began skating when she was six or seven in Tournai. She later trained in Wevelgem until the rink there closed and then in Ghent. Hovine then trained in Antwerp, where she lived alone during the week and her parents joined her on the weekends. She began taking online classes when she was twelve due to her training schedule. She was coached by Ans Bocklandt.

In November 2018, Hovine won the 2019 Belgian Junior Championships.

=== 2019–2020 season: Junior international debut ===
Making her junior international debut, Hovine placed twenty-third at the 2019 Ice Star and twentieth at the 2019 Volvo Open Cup.

In November, Hovine made her senior national debut at the 2020 Belgian Championships. She followed this up with a tenth-place finish on the junior level at the 2020 Santa Claus Cup before closing the season by placing twenty-first on the junior level at the 2020 International Challenge Cup.

=== 2020–2021 season ===
Hovine started the season by winning gold on the junior level at the 2020 Ice Star and placing sixth on the junior level at the 2021 Sofia Trophy. She then finished the season by placing eighth on the junior level at the 2021 Egna Spring Trophy.

=== 2021–2022 season: Senior international debut ===
Hovine began the season by winning the silver medal at the 2022 Belgian Championships behind Loena Hendrickx. A couple weeks later, she made her senior international debut and finished fourth at the 2021 Santa Claus Cup.

She then went on to place fourth at the 2022 IceLab International Cup, seventh at the 2022 Dragon Trophy, and thirteenth at the 2022 International Challenge Cup. Hovine subsequently closed the season by finishing fifth at the 2022 Coupe du Printemps.

=== 2022–2023 season: World Championships debut ===
Hovine considered finishing her skating career after she did not qualify to compete at the 2022 Winter Olympics, but she decided to continue training. She later said, "I have made so many sacrifices throughout my life for this sport that it was foolish to stop everything when I was on the verge of success."

She started the season in September by competing on the 2023–24 ISU Junior Grand Prix circuit, finishing thirteenth at the 2022 JGP Latvia. Hovine followed this up by competing on the senior international level, finishing seventeenth at the 2022 CS Finlandia Trophy and winning silver at the 2022 Trophée Métropole Nice Côte d'Azur.

In November, Hovine won the silver medal at the 2023 Belgian Championships. Later that month, she won her first international competition, the 2022 NRW Trophy, ahead of Stefanie Pesendorfer and Kristina Isaev. She then competed at the 2022 CS Golden Spin of Zagreb, earning new personal best free skate and combined total scores, and finishing eighth overall.

In February, it was announced that she would receive a Wallonian sports scholarship in exchange for promoting her sport and the infrastructure she used to train. That same month, it was also announced that she had left longtime coach, Ans Bocklandt, and had relocated to France to train under Malika Tahir. She subsequently finished fourth at the 2022 Latvia Trophy and sixth at the 2023 Dragon Trophy.

Selected to compete at the 2023 World Junior Championships, Hovine qualified for the free program in twenty-fourth place. She rose to twenty-third place overall despite two falls in her free skate. Later in the month, she competed at the senior World Championships as part of Belgium's largest-ever delegation. She skated cleanly and set a personal best in the short program, where she placed twenty-sixth and did not advance to the free skate segment.

In May, she moved to Cote d'Azur, where she joined her physical trainer, with whom she had been training remotely, and began university. She also changed coaches from Malika Tahir to Cédric Tour, who had previously accompanied her to competitions, and Rodolphe Maréchal.

=== 2023–2024 season: European Championships debut ===
Hovine began the season by finishing sixth at the 2023 Trophée Métropole Nice Côte d'Azur and fifth at the 2023 CS Denis Ten Memorial Challenge. She followed these results up by winning the silver medal at the 2024 Belgian Championships behind Nina Pinzarrone, before finishing twelfth at the 2023 CS Golden Spin of Zagreb.

In January, Hovine competed at her first European Championships. She was seriously ill and unable to train for a week before the competition. She placed nineteenth in the short program after making a mistake on her triple Lutz jump and double Axel, but she qualified for the free skate. In her free skate, she popped a planned triple flip jump, and she ended the competition in twenty-third place. She expressed disappointment in her performance, saying, "I can't figure out why it happened – I was super focused, aiming to deliver the best performance of my life," but she added, "But that's life, that's skating, and that's sports. I'm still happy. Overall, it was a beautiful competition, and I achieved my goal of qualifying for the free skate." She then closed the season by finishing sixth at the 2024 Bellu Memorial.

=== 2024–2025 season ===
Hovine planned to open her season at the Nebelhorn Trophy in September; however, she withdrew for medical reasons as she suffered from inflammation in her vertebrae. She instead debuted at the 2024 CS Trophée Métropole Nice Côte d'Azur in October, where she finished in seventeenth place after falling twice in her free skate.

In November, Hovine had a stronger performance at the 2024 Volvo Open Cup in November, where she won the bronze medal. She said that she was disappointed with her short program there but that winning a medal boosted her morale. Hovine next competed at the 2024 CS Tallinn Trophy, where she finished in fifth place. Afterward, she caught the flu but competed again at the Santa Claus Cup, her third competition that month, though she said afterward that she was not in a good physical state to compete and the competition left her exhausted.

In January, Hovine competed at the 2025 European Championships in Tallinn, Estonia. She finished the short program in eleventh place after landing a new triple flip-triple loop jump combination, which she had wanted to try in competition after having success with it in practice for several months. Hovine said that she was happy with her performance, especially as she had travel difficulties getting to the competition and had been crying due to stress in her last practice before the short program. She was also skating with inflammation in her foot due to a boot issue. In her free skate, although she had no falls, she made several mistakes on her jumps and fell to sixteenth place overall.

Hovine competed at two further competitions in February, the 2025 International Challenge Cup and the 2025 Bellu Memorial, in an attempt to reach the minimum technical score to be eligible for the 2025 World Championships. However, she failed to do so by only 0.09 points. At those events, she finished fourth and fifth, respectively.

=== 2025–2026 season ===
Hovine opened her season by winning bronze at the 2025 Master's de Patinage. She went on to compete at the 2025 CS Nepela Memorial but withdrew from the event following the short program. In October, Hovine finished fourth at the 2025 Trophée Métropole Nice Côte d'Azur and won silver at the 2025 Gordion Cup. The following month, she finished twenty-second at the 2025 CS Warsaw Cup.

On 26 February 2026, Hovine was called up to compete at the 2026 World Championships following Loena Hendrickx' withdrawal. At the 2026 World Championships, she finished thirtieth after the short program, unable to advance to the free skate.

== Programs ==
Season	Short program	Free skating
2025–2026	Hymne à l'amour by Édith Piaf performed by Celine Dion choreo. by Thomas Rochelet	Spectre; Los muertos vivos estan by Thomas Newman ft. Tambuco; Writing's on the Wall by Sam Smith & Jimmy Napes performed by Sofia Karlberg choreo. by Thomas Rochelet
2024–2025	Bohemian Rhapsody by Freddie Mercury performed by Daisy Gray arranged by Cédric Tour choreo. by Thomas Rochelet	A Short Elevator Ride; At Last by The Newton Brothers both arranged by Cédric Tour & John Andrew Grush; Yellow Moon by Luca D’Alberto; Angel by the Wings by Sia both arranged by Cédric Tour choreo. by Thomas Rochelet
2023–2024	Six Foot Under; You Should See Me in a Crown by Billie Eilish choreo. by Romain Gazave	Histoire d'un amour by Hélène Ségara choreo. by Adam Solya
2022–2023	Black Hole Sun by Swann ft. Nouela; A Distant Lament by Colossal Trailer; Run by Ludovico Einaudi choreo. by Benoit Richaud	The Godfather; The Immigrant Song; Speak Softly Love choreo. by Benoît Richaud
2021–2022	Toxic by Britney Spears & Maxime Rodriguez	Requiem for a Dream by Clint Mansell

== Competitive highlights ==
- JGP – Event of the ISU Junior Grand Prix Series
- CS – Event of the ISU Challenger Series
- TBD – Assigned
- WD – Withdrew from competition

Competition placements at senior level
Season	2019–20	2021–22	2022–23	2023–24	2024–25	2025–26
World Championships			26th			30th
European Championships				23rd	16th	
Belgian Championships	2nd	2nd	2nd	2nd		
CS Denis Ten Memorial Challenge				5th		
CS Finlandia Trophy			17th			
CS Golden Spin of Zagreb			8th	12th		
CS Nepela Memorial						WD
CS Tallinn Trophy					5th	
CS Trophée Métropole Nice Côte d'Azur					17th	
CS Warsaw Cup						22nd
Bellu Memorial				6th	4th	
Challenge Cup		13th	WD		5th	
Coupe du Printemps		5th				
Dragon Trophy		7th	6th			
Gordion Cup						2nd
IceLab Cup		4th				
Latvia Trophy			4th			
Master's de Patinage		4th				3rd
NRW Trophy			1st			
Santa Claus Cup		4th			11th	
Sofia Trophy			WD			
Trophée Métropole Nice Côte d'Azur			2nd	6th		4th
Volvo Open Cup					3rd	

Competition placements at junior level
Season	2017–18	2018–19	2019–20	2020–21	2021–22	2022–23
World Junior Championships						23rd
Belgian Championships	4th	1st				
JGP Latvia						13th
Challenge Cup			21st			
Egna Spring Trophy				8th		
Ice Star			23rd	1st		
Santa Claus Cup			10th			
Sofia Trophy				6th		
Volvo Open Cup			20th			

== Detailed results ==
ISU personal best scores in the +5/-5 GOE System
Segment	Type	Score	Event
Total	TSS	161.66	2022 CS Golden Spin of Zagreb
Short program	TSS	56.19	2025 European Championships
Short program	TES	30.87	2023 World Championships
Short program	PCS	26.07	2023 CS Denis Ten Memorial Challenge
Free skating	TSS	112.15	2022 CS Golden Spin of Zagreb
Free skating	TES	59.68	2022 CS Golden Spin of Zagreb
Free skating	PCS	52.47	2022 CS Golden Spin of Zagreb

=== Senior level ===
Results in the 2025–26 season
Date	Event	SP		FS		Total	
Date	Event	P	Score	P	Score	P	Score
Aug 28–30, 2025	(Belgium) 2025 Master's de Patinage	3	54.65	3	88.30	3	142.95
Sep 25–27, 2025	(Slovakia) 2025 CS Nepela Memorial	21	38.19	–	–	–	WD
Oct 1–5, 2025	(France) 2025 Trophée Métropole Nice Côte d'Azur	6	46.47	4	88.61	4	135.08
Oct 23–25, 2025	(Turkey) 2025 Gordion Cup	2	47.89	2	84.35	2	132.24
Nov 19–23, 2025	(Poland) 2025 CS Warsaw Cup	23	36.62	19	77.95	22	114.57
Mar 24–29, 2026	(Czech Republic) 2026 World Championships	30	47.05	—N/a	—N/a	30	47.05
