= Sara Falotico =

Italian-Belgian figure skater

Personal information
- Born: 28 June 1984 (age 42) Seraing, Wallonia, Belgium
- Height: 1.59 m (5 ft 3 in)

Figure skating career
- Country: Italy
- Coach: Jana Vaysse; Rostislav Sinicyn
- Skating club: A.s.d. Sesto Ice Skate
- Began skating: 1990

Sara Falotico (born 28 June 1984) is an Italian-Belgian figure skater. Competing for Belgium until 2006, she became a three-time Belgian national champion (2002, 2004, and 2005) and reached the free skate at six ISU Championships. In 2014, she began competing for Italy.

== Career ==
Falotico represented Belgium at the World Championships three times, achieving her highest placement (25th) in 2003; four times at the European Championships, with a highest placement of 21st in 2004; and four times at the World Junior Championships, with a highest placement of 21st in 2002 and 2003.

Falotico appeared at the 2005 Karl Schäfer Memorial, the final qualifying competition for the 2006 Winter Olympics, but her result, 8th, was insufficient to earn a spot at the Olympics. She did not compete in the following seasons.

Falotico returned to competition in the 2014–15 season, training at A.s.d. Sesto Ice Skate and representing Italy internationally. She won the 2014 Open d'Andorra and finished 6th at the Italian Championships.

== Programs ==
Season	Short program	Free skating
2015–16	Historia de un Amor; Mambo Jambo	Life Is Beautiful by Nicola Piovani; Beautiful That Way
2004–05	Vuelvo Al Sur; Santa Maria by Gotan Project	Amélie by Yann Tiersen
2003–04	Vuelvo Al Sur; Santa Maria by Gotan Project	Journey of Man (from Cirque du Soleil) by Benoît Jutras
2002–03	Tanguera by Mariano Mores; The Proprietor by Richard Robbins	Journey of Man (from Cirque du Soleil) by Benoît Jutras
2001–02	Tanguera by Mariano Mores; The Proprietor by Richard Robbins	Speranza (Cavalleria rusticana) by Pietro Mascagni Marcus Vianna Tranfonica Orchestra
2000–01	Yello Baby by Boris Blank	Asterix and Obelix vs. Caesar by Jean-Jacques Goldman, Roland Romanelli

== Competitive highlights ==
CS: Challenger Series; JGP: Junior Grand Prix

International
Event	97–98 (BEL)	98–99 (BEL)	99–00 (BEL)	00–01 (BEL)	01–02 (BEL)	02–03 (BEL)	03–04 (BEL)	04–05 (BEL)	05–06 (BEL)	14–15 (ITA)	15–16 (ITA)
Worlds						25th	28th	26th			
Europeans			25th		24th	24th	21st				
CS Ice Challenge											20th
CS Nepela Trophy											18th
Golden Spin								5th			
Karl Schäfer									8th		
Nebelhorn						10th	8th				
Open d'Andorra										1st	
DS Cup										4th	
Lombardia Trophy											13th
Nepela Memorial				11th							
Skate Israel									2nd		
International: Junior
Junior Worlds			22nd	27th	21st	21st					
JGP Canada			16th								
JGP Czech Rep.					13th						
JGP Germany				19th							
JGP Italy					8th						
JGP Mexico		13th									
JGP Norway				10th							
JGP Sweden			15th								
JGP United States						9th					
Gardena		8th J.									
National
Belgian	1st J.	1st J.	1st J.	2nd	1st	2nd	1st	1st			
Italian										6th	7th
J. = Junior level
