= Figure skating at the 1928 Winter Olympics – Pairs =

Figure skating at the Olympics

Pair skating at the II Olympic Winter Games
- Venue: Eisstadion Badrutts Park
- Date: 19 February 1928
- Competitors: 26 from 10 nations

Medalists
1st place, gold medalist(s)		Andrée Brunet / Pierre Brunet; France
2nd place, silver medalist(s)		Lilly Scholz / Otto Kaiser; Austria
3rd place, bronze medalist(s)		Melitta Brunner / Ludwig Wrede; Austria

The pair skating event was held as part of the figure skating at the 1928 Winter Olympics. It was the fourth appearance of the event, which had previously been held at the Summer Olympics in 1908 and 1920 and was also part of the first Winter Games in 1924. The competition was held on Sunday, 19 February 1928. Twenty-six figure skaters from ten nations competed.

== Results ==
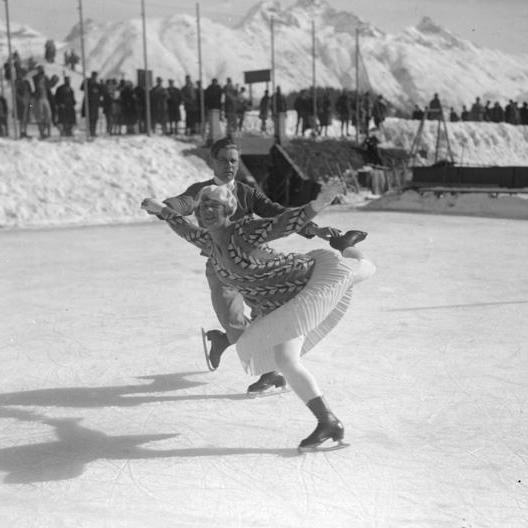
Lilly Scholz / Otto Kaiser on the way to win the silver medal.

Rank	Name	Nation	Total points	Places
1	Andrée Joly / Pierre Brunet	France	100.50	14
2	Lilly Scholz / Otto Kaiser	Austria	99.25	17
3	Melitta Brunner / Ludwig Wrede	Austria	93.25	29
4	Beatrix Loughran / Sherwin Badger	United States	87.50	43
5	Ludowika Jakobsson / Walter Jakobsson	Finland	84.00	51
6	Josy Van Leberghe / Robert van Zeebroeck	Belgium	83.00	54
7	Ethel Muckelt / John Page	Great Britain	79.00	61.5
8	Ilse Kishauer / Ernst Gaste	Germany	75.75	63
9	Theresa Blanchard / Nathaniel Niles	United States	69.00	79.5
10	Maude Smith / Jack Eastwood	Canada	67.25	95.5
11	Elvira Barbey / Louis Barbey	Switzerland	64.75	97
12	Libuše Veselá / Vojtěch Veselý	Czechoslovakia	60.00	102
13	Kathleen Lovett / Proctor Burman	Great Britain	57.75	110.5

Referee:

- (Sweden) M. V. Lundquist

Judges:

- (Germany) Heinrich Burger
- (Finland) Sakari Ilmanen
- (Switzerland) J.G. Künzli
- (United States) Joel B. Liberman
- (Austria) Walter Muller
- (France) Francis Pigueron
- (United Kingdom) Thomas D. Richardson
- (Czechoslovakia) Josef Slíva
- (Belgium) Edouard Delpy
