= Jorik Hendrickx =

Belgian figure skater

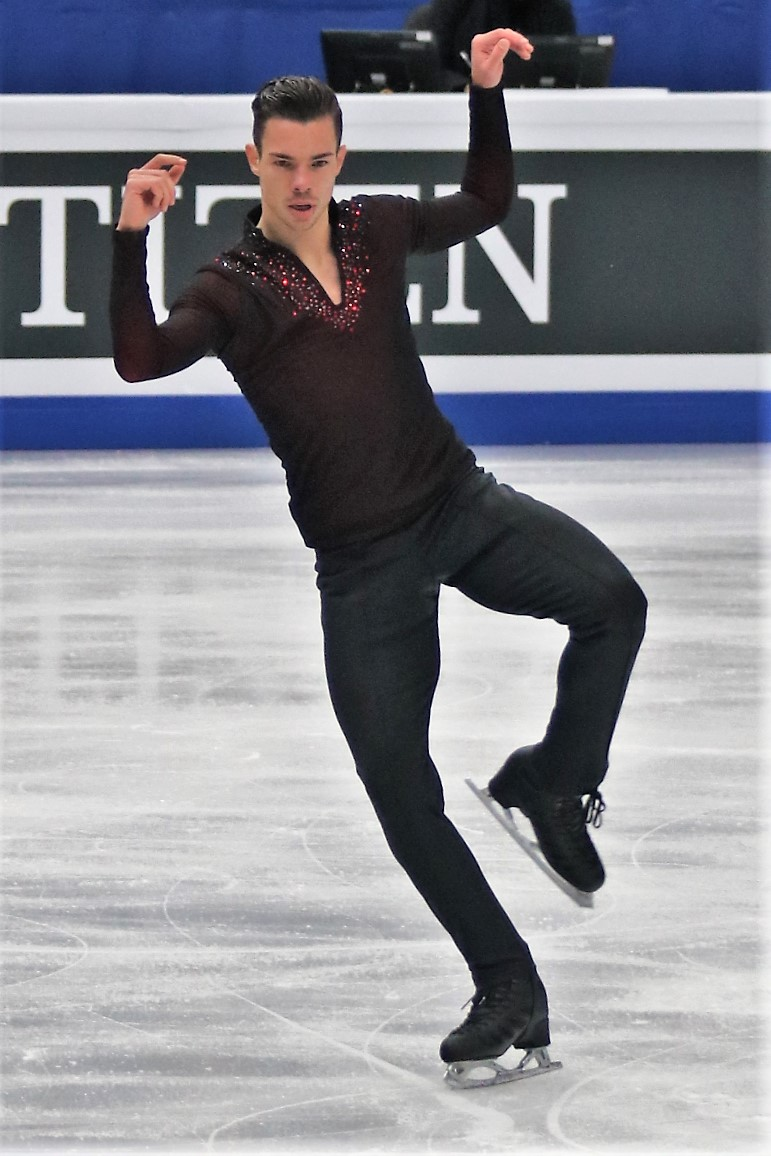
- Hendrickx in 2018.

Personal information
- Born: 18 May 1992 (age 34) Turnhout, Belgium
- Home town: Arendonk, Belgium
- Height: 1.75 m (5 ft 9 in)

Figure skating career
- Country: Belgium
- Skating club: N.O.T. Turnhout
- Began skating: 1997
- Retired: 8 August 2019

Medal record
Belgium Championships
Gold medal – first place	2016 Maaseik	Singles
Gold medal – first place	2017 Lommel	Singles

Jorik Hendrickx (born 18 May 1992) is a Belgian former competitive figure skater. He is the 2017 CS Nebelhorn Trophy champion, the 2016 CS Nebelhorn Trophy silver medalist, a three-time Coupe du Printemps champion (2012, 2013, 2016), the 2017 International Challenge Cup champion, and a three-time Belgian national champion (2010, 2016, 2017). He qualified to the final segment at five World Championships and two Winter Olympics, finishing 16th in 2014 and 14th in 2018. He placed in the top ten at five European Championships.

== Personal life ==
Jorik Hendrickx was born in Turnhout, Belgium. He studied sport marketing and management at Johan Cruyff University in Tilburg. In early 2017, he began an internship at Speedo, working on a research project. At All Sport Benelux, his research focuses on the growth of Belgian e-commerce. His younger sister, Loena, is also a figure skater.

On February 1, 2018, Hendrickx publicly came out as gay.

== Career ==
Hendrickx began training at age five and a half. Since the age of 10, he is coached by Carine Herrygers. He began competing on the junior level internationally in 2007. He was out for four months in 2008 as a result of a groin injury. He debuted on the ISU Junior Grand Prix series in autumn 2009.

Hendrickx finished 9th at the 2012 European Championships. The next season, he received his first senior Grand Prix assignment, the 2012 Trophee Eric Bompard in November. Hendrickx placed 4th in the short program, but had to withdraw the next day after sustaining an injury in an off-ice warmup for the morning practice. He fractured his ankle, tearing ligaments from his fibula. Returning to the ice in January 2013, Hendrickx began practicing some jumps toward the end of the month. He missed the 2013 European Championships but competed at the 2013 World Championships, finishing 19th and qualifying a men's entry for Belgium at the 2014 Winter Olympics. He finished 16th.

After Turnhout's ice rink closed, Hendrickx decided to train at a temporary rink. He said, "It's extremely cold and the quality of the ice is not what it should be. The most important thing is that I didn't have to change environment, my school, coaches, medical team." He finished 4th at the 2017 European Championships in Ostrava, Czech Republic. It was the best result by a Belgian skater since 2009.

Hendricks won the 2017 Nebelhorn Trophy, and obtained a men's singles entry for Belgium at the 2018 Winter Olympics at Pyeongchang, South Korea. He participated in the figure skating event at the Olympics with his sister Loena, who also represented Belgium at the ladies' singles. After the Olympics, he skipped the 2018–19 figure skating season, and announced his retirement on 8 August 2019.

== Coaching career ==
Following his retirement, Hendrickx became a figure skating coach and now coaches alongside Adam Solya.

His current and former students include:

- (Belgium) Loena Hendrickx – 2022 World silver medal, 2023 World bronze medalist, and 2023 European silver medalist
- (Germany) Nikita Starostin – 2023 German National champion
- (Netherlands) Angel Delevaque
- (Austria) Tobia Oellerer
- (Slovenia) David Sedej
- (Netherlands) Lindsay van Zundert – 2021 Dutch National champion
- (Belgium) Nina Pinzarrone

== Programs ==
Season	Short program	Free skating
2017–18	Je suis malade performed by Francesco di Cello	Concierto de Aranjuez by Joaquín Rodrigo performed by Il Divo
2016–17	Broken Vow performed by Josh Groban; Silence by Delerium, feat. Sarah McLachlan	The Battle of Life and Death: Gods and Demons by Future World Music; Voca Me by Libera's
2015–16	You Raise Me Up performed by Josh Groban	Titanic by James Horner
2014–15	1900 by Ennio Morricone	Piano Concerto for the Left Hand in D Major by Maurice Ravel
2013–14	Caravan by Duke Ellington	Rhapsody in Blue by George Gershwin
2012–13	Cry Me a River by Michael Bublé; At Last by Kenny G; Spiderman by Michael Bublé	Violin Concerto by Max Bruch
2011–12	Feeling Good by Michael Bublé choreo. by Pasquale Camerlengo, Sandy Sue	Dragon: The Bruce Lee Story by Randy Edelman
2010–11	Feeling Good by Michael Bublé choreo. by Pasquale Camerlengo, Sandy Sue	Flamenco by Didulia; Tango selection by unknown choreo. by Sandy Sue
2009–10	The Kite Runner by Alberto Iglesias	El Conquistador by Maxime Rodriguez; Adiós Nonino by Astor Piazzolla

== Results ==
GP: Grand Prix; CS: Challenger Series; JGP: Junior Grand Prix

International
Event	07–08	08–09	09–10	10–11	11–12	12–13	13–14	14–15	15–16	16–17	17–18	18–19
Olympics							16th				14th	
Worlds				19th		19th	17th		16th	21st		
Europeans			20th	16th	9th		9th		9th	4th	10th	
GP France						WD				6th		
GP Finland												WD
GP NHK Trophy								WD				
GP Skate America								12th		9th	WD	WD
GP Skate Canada											5th	
CS Finlandia										5th		
CS Ice Challenge									4th			
CS Nebelhorn									8th	2nd	1st	
Bavarian Open						8th						
Challenge Cup					4th					1st		
Crystal Skate					2nd							
Cup of Nice					4th	4th			5th		2nd	
Finlandia Trophy							5th					
Nebelhorn Trophy					8th							
NRW Trophy				5th			3rd		1st			
Printemps					1st	1st			1st			
Warsaw Cup							2nd					
International: Junior
Junior Worlds			15th	13th								
JGP Austria				7th								
JGP Germany				6th								
JGP Poland			11th									
JGP Turkey			9th									
Challenge Cup		3rd J										
Cup of Nice	9th J		1st J									
NRW Trophy	5th J	3rd J	2nd J									
National
Belgian Champ.	2nd J	1st J	1st	2nd	2nd				1st	1st		
J = Junior level; TBD = Assigned; WD = Withdrew

== Detailed results ==
Small medals for short program and free skating awarded only at ISU Championships.

2017–18 season
Date	Event	SP	FS	Total
16–17 February 2018	2018 Winter Olympics	11; 84.74	16; 164.21	14; 248.95
15–21 January 2018	2018 European Championships	5; 78.56	12; 139.61	10; 218.17
24–26 November 2017	2017 Skate America	WD	WD	WD
October 27–29, 2017	2017 Skate Canada International	6; 82.08	6; 155.23	5; 237.31
27 – 30 September 2017	2017 CS Nebelhorn Trophy	1; 85.15	1; 167.91	1; 253.06
2016–17 season
Date	Event	SP	FS	Total
29 March – 2 April 2017	2017 World Figure Skating Championships	21; 73.68	22; 140.34	21; 214.02
25–29 January 2017	2017 European Championships	5; 82.50	5; 160.06	4; 242.56
11–13 November 2016	2016 Trophée de France	5; 80.34	8; 150.13	6; 230.47
21–23 October 2016	2016 Skate America	7; 76.62	9; 148.29	9; 224.91
6–10 October 2016	2016 CS Finlandia Trophy	5; 79.22	6; 139.10	5; 218.32
September 22–24, 2016	2016 CS Nebelhorn Trophy	5; 71.90	2; 151.14	2; 223.04
2015–16 season
Date	Event	SP	FS	Total
28 March – 3 April 2016	2016 World Championships	14; 77.72	15; 143.71	16; 221.43
March 11–13, 2016	2016 Coupe du Printemps	2; 77.45	1; 165.77	1; 243.22
26–31 January 2016	2016 European Championships	7; 79.13	9; 142.26	9; 221.39
November 24–29, 2015	2015 NRW Trophy	2; 82.93	1; 161.76	1; 244.69
October 27–31, 2015	2015 Ice Challenge	4; 74.55	3; 158.92	4; 233.47
15–18 October 2015	2015 International Cup of Nice	5; 73.94	5; 138.16	5; 212.10
September 24–26, 2015	2015 Nebelhorn Trophy	4; 73.88	9; 119.84	8; 193.72
2014–15 season
Date	Event	SP	FS	Total
24–26 October 2014	2014 Skate America	12; 55.99	11; 121.44	12; 177.43
2013–14 season
Date	Event	SP	FS	Total
26–29 March 2014	2014 World Championships	17; 65.456	18; 131.22	17; 196.78
13–14 February 2014	2014 Winter Olympics	16; 72.52	15; 141.52	16; 214.04
13–19 January 2014	2014 European Championships	10; 73.21	10; 132.71	9; 205.92
4 – 8 December 2013	2013 NRW Trophy	2; 69.32	5; 121.52	3; 190.84
13–17 November 2014	2013 CS Warsaw Cup	2; 59.62	2; 128.13	2; 187.75
24–27 October 2014	2014 Crystal Skate of Romania	5; 49.14	3; 117.58	4; 166.72
4–6 October 2013	2013 Finlandia Trophy	4; 69.18	6; 130.57	5; 199.75
