= Nina Pinzarrone =

Belgian figure skater (born 2006)

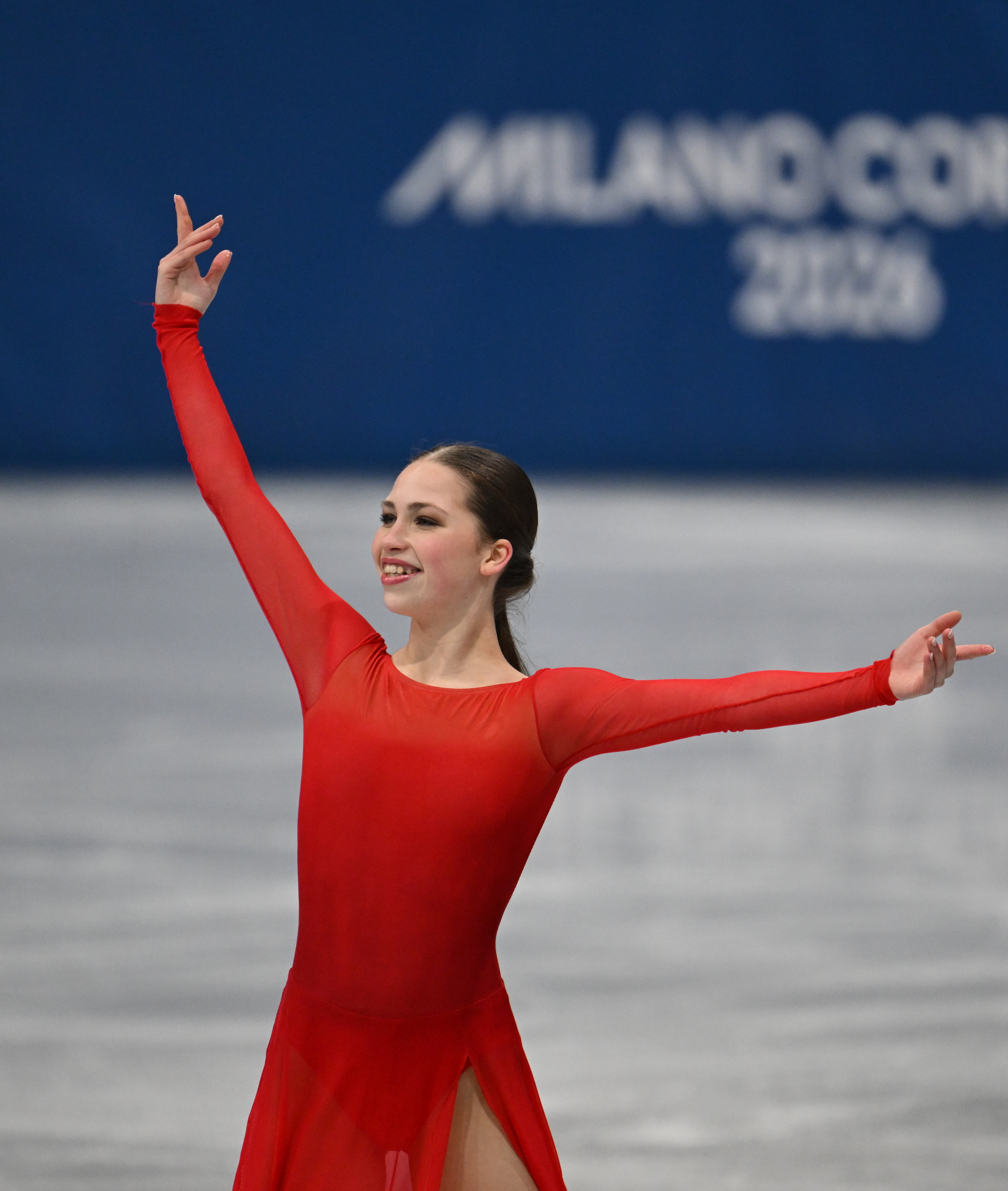
- Nina Pinzarrone at the 2026 Winter Olympics

Personal information
- Born: November 24, 2006 (age 19) Brussels, Belgium
- Home town: Brussels, Belgium
- Height: 1.62 m (5 ft 4 in)

Figure skating career
- Country: Belgium
- Discipline: Women's singles
- Coach: Jorik Hendrickx
- Skating club: ASW Antwerp
- Began skating: 2011

Medal record
World Championships
Bronze medal – third place	2026 Prague	Singles
European Championships
Bronze medal – third place	2024 Kaunas	Singles
Bronze medal – third place	2025 Tallinn	Singles
Belgian Championships
Gold medal – first place	2024 Mechelen	Singles
Gold medal – first place	2025 Hasselt	Singles
Gold medal – first place	2026 Deurne	Singles

Nina Pinzarrone (born November 24, 2006) is a Belgian figure skater. She is the 2026 World bronze medalist, a two-time European bronze medalist (2024 and 2025), three-time Belgian national champion (2024–26), and a two-time ISU Grand Prix medalist, one of only two Belgian women to have medaled at those events.

She represented Belgium at the 2026 Winter Olympics.

== Personal life ==
Pinzarrone was born on November 24, 2006, in Brussels, Belgium. Her mother, Laurence Novalet, is also from Brussels while her father, Mario Pinzarrone, is of Italian origin. She has an older sister, Lily, who is also a figure skater. Pinzarrone's mother tongue is French; she learned Dutch at school and also speaks English. Because her father is of Italian heritage, she studied the Italian language for a year as a fourth language but does not speak it. She is currently studying for a degree in nutrition.

== Career ==
=== Early years ===
Pinzarrone began learning how to skate in 2010 at the age of three. She followed her sister Lily, who became interested after watching figure skating on television. She began working with her coach Ans Bocklandt at age 4 in 2011.

=== 2021–22 season: International junior debut ===
Pinzarrone made her international junior and ISU Junior Grand Prix debuts in August at the 2022 JGP France II, the second of two JGP events hosted in Courchevel, France. She placed fifth in the short program and sixth in the free skate to place sixth overall. At her second JGP assignment, the 2022 JGP Slovenia, Pinzarrone replicated her short program and free skate placements from Courchevel but finished fifth in the overall standings.

Pinzarrone did not compete again until November, when she handily won her second Belgian junior national title. Following her win, between December 2021 and February 2022, she claimed the junior women's titles at the Santa Claus Cup, the Icelab International Cup, and the Dragon Trophy. She finished seventh at the Challenge Cup in March.

In April, Pinzarrone competed at her first World Junior Championship. There, she was seventh in the short program but fell to sixteenth in the free skate after a series of mishaps, ultimately winding up in eleventh overall.

=== 2022–23 season: International senior debut ===
Pinzarrone was assigned to her first Grand Prix event, the 2022 MK John Wilson Trophy, in July. In August, she received a second assignment, replacing South Korean skater Lim Eun-soo at the 2022 Skate Canada International. She later withdrew from both events due to a hip injury, subsequently revealed to be a double stress fracture.

After recovering, Pinzarrone won the silver medal at the Latvia Trophy. Having acquired senior technical minimums, she was assigned to compete at the European Championships for the first time, alongside longtime Belgian national champion Loena Hendrickx. Her coach stated that her primary objectives for the event were to achieve the minimum scores to take Belgium's second berth at the World Championships later in the season. Pinzarrone underrotated the second part of her jump combination in the short program, but she still finished sixth in the segment. She rose to fifth place after the free skate. She had the second-best technical score in the free skate.

Due to Hendrickx's placement at the previous year's World Championships, Belgium had three berths in the women's event in Saitama. Pinzarrone, Hendrickx and national silver medalist Jade Hovine all had the minimum scores necessary to attend, comprising the largest Belgian women's delegation in the event's history. Pinzarrone finished eleventh.

=== 2023–24 season: Grand Prix medals and European bronze ===
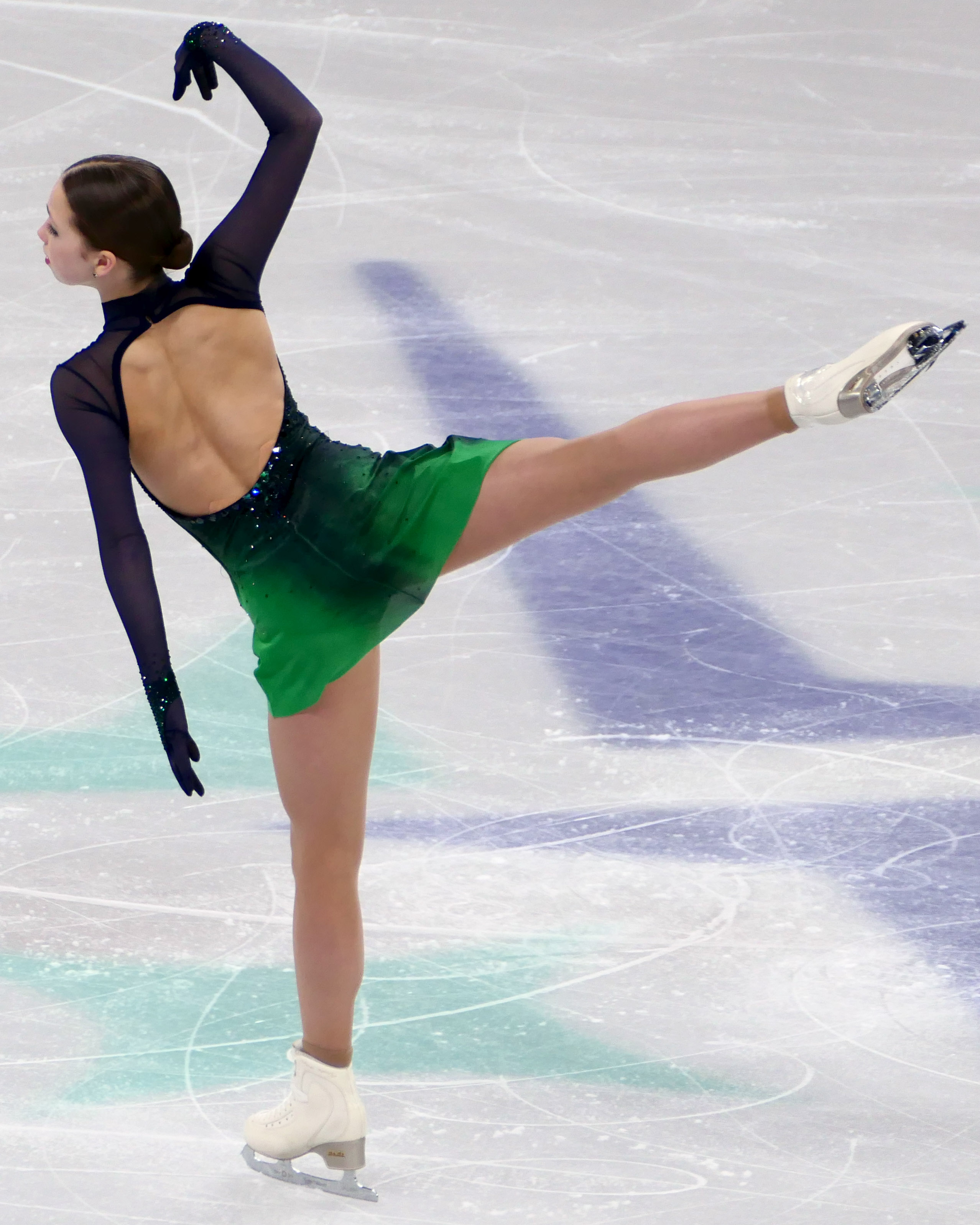
Pinzarrone during her short program at the 2024 World Championships

Beginning the season at the 2023 CS Lombardia Trophy, Pinzarrone finished ninth. Speaking of this event later, she would opine: "At Lombardia I really wasn't myself." She was also invited to attend the Shanghai Trophy, coming fourth of six skaters. She called the latter invitation "an amazing experience."

Making her Grand Prix debut following the previous year's withdrawals, Pinzarrone appeared first at the 2023 Grand Prix de France, where she finished fourth in the short program with a new personal best 65.74 points, only 0.99 points back of second-place Anastasiia Gubanova of Georgia. She set another new personal best in the free skate (133.06) and rose to second overall. Her silver medal made her only the second Belgian woman to medal on the Grand Prix, after Hendrickx. Of the feat, she said: "It doesn’t feel real." The week before her second Grand Prix assignment, she appeared at her first senior Belgian championships. With Loena Hendrickx withdrawing due to illness, Pinzarrone won her first national title by more than forty points.

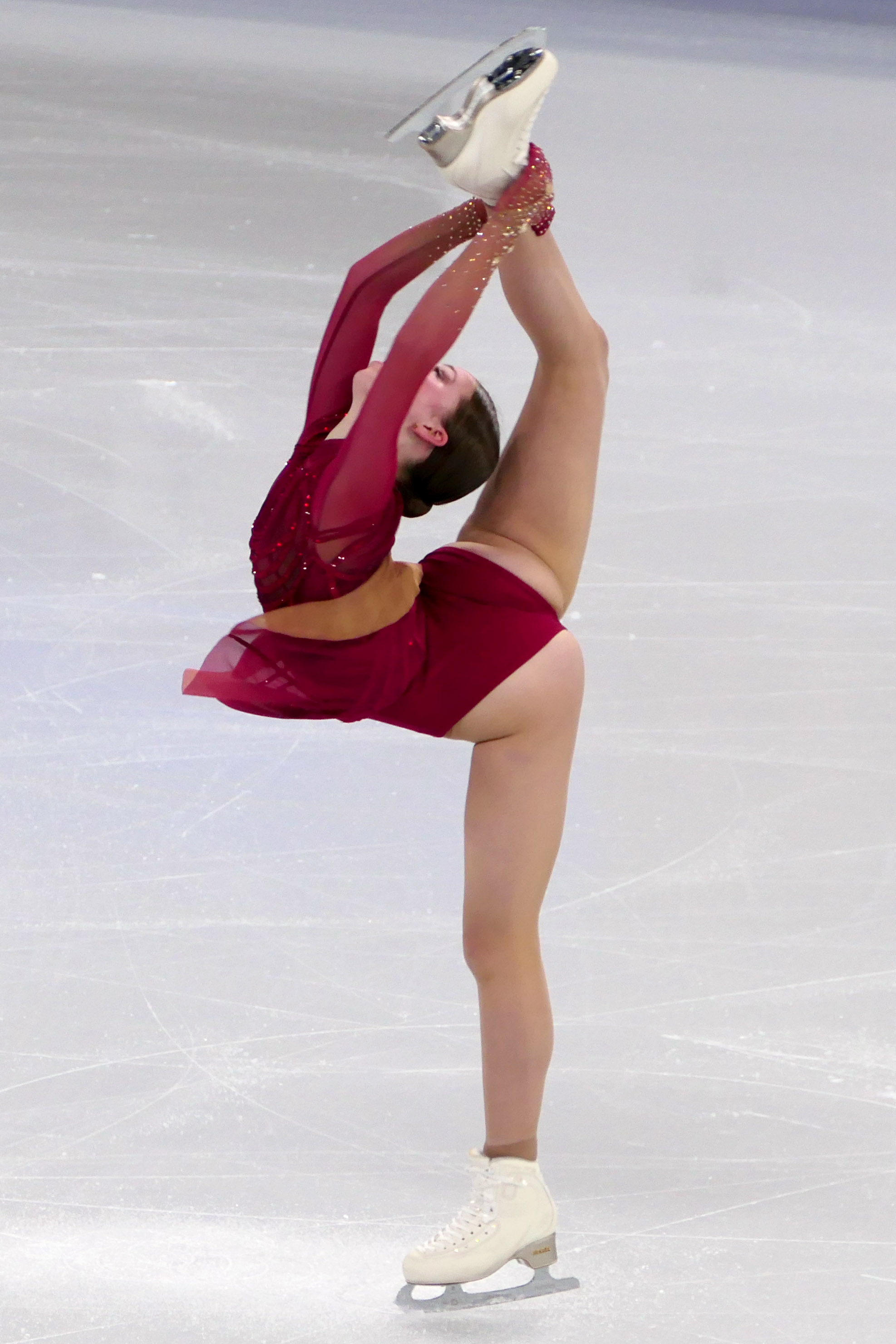
Pinzarrone performing her signature needle spin during her free skate at the 2024 World Championships

At the 2023 NHK Trophy, Pinzarrone placed second in both segments, but third overall, winning the bronze medal and qualifying to the Grand Prix Final for the first time. She said she had not considered this result a possibility at the start of the season, and she added that it was "so cool" that both she and Hendrickx had qualified, the first time two Belgian women had done so. Pinzarrone went on to finish fourth at the Final.

Pinzarrone entered the 2024 European Championships as a podium favourite after her results in the first half of the season. She finished second in the short program with a personal best 69.70 points, less than a point ahead of third-place Anastasiia Gubanova of Georgia, the defending champion. In the free skate, four of her jumps were deemed a quarter underrotated. She was third in that segment and placed third overall behind Hendrickx and Gubanova. With her bronze medal alongside Hendrickx's gold, Belgium had two women on the European podium for the first time, with Pinzarrone also only the second woman (after Hendrickx) to make the European podium.

In the lead-up to the 2024 World Championships in Montreal, Pinzarrone was plagued with nosebleeds that hindered her training and performance. In advance of the free program, she had her nose cauterized without anesthesia and skated with a cotton ball in her nostril. She finished fifteenth and said afterward: "It is difficult to skate at full speed for 4 minutes anyway and that was even more difficult now. I did my best until the end and I think I did well in my circumstances."

=== 2024–25 season: Second consecutive European bronze medal ===
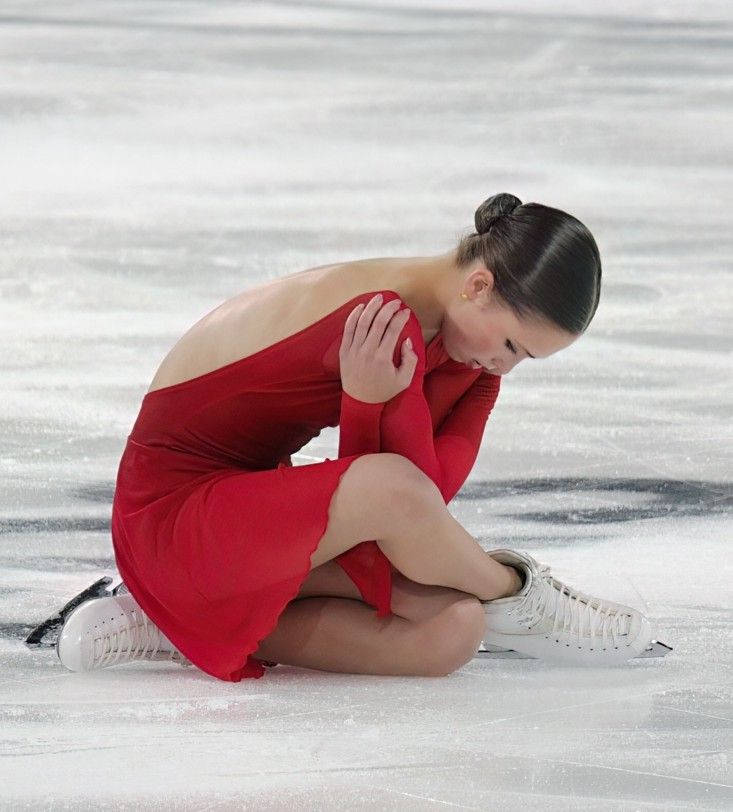
Pinzarrone during her free skate at the 2024 Grand Prix de France

Pinzarrone started the season by competing on the 2024–25 Grand Prix series. She finished fourth at 2024 Skate America. Shortly following the event, Eric Christian von Fricken, who composed one of the pieces of music that Pinzarrone used for her free program, took to social media accounts to praise her performance. Going on to compete at the 2024 Grand Prix de France, Pinzarrone would finish the event in sixth place.

Pinzarrone then competed on the 2024–25 ISU Challenger Series, winning gold at the 2024 CS Tallinn Trophy and silver at the 2024 CS Golden Spin of Zagreb. She won her second consecutive Belgian national title in January, though unusually, she did not compete at the main event, as it was held only ten days before the 2025 European Championships; the Belgian federation gave its top women's skaters the additional opportunity to compete at the Golden Spin instead and count their scores from that competition.

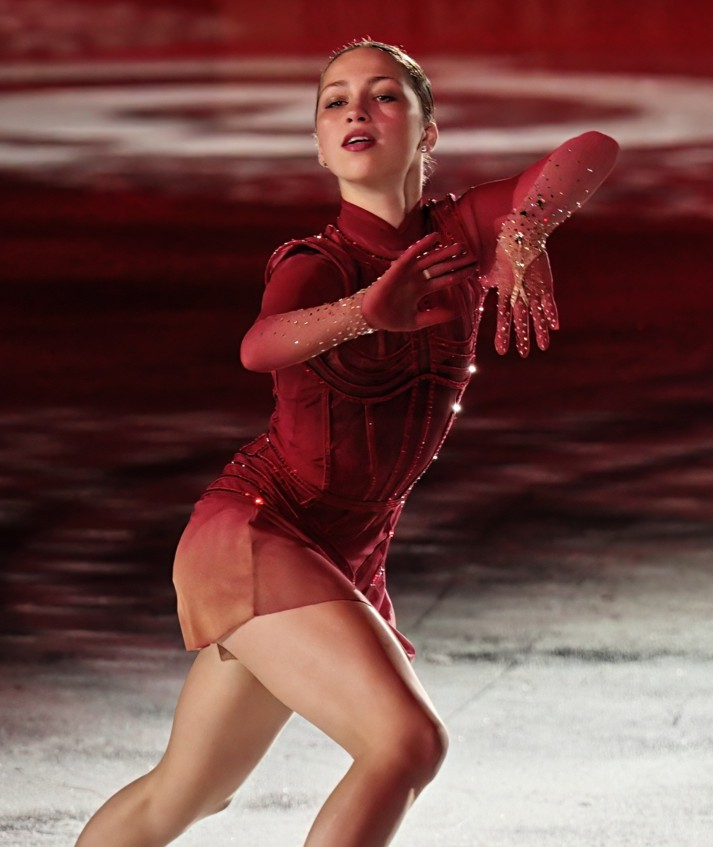
Pinzarrone performing her exhibition program at the 2024 Grand Prix de France

At the end of January, Pinzarrone competed at the European Championships. She earned a season's best in the short program despite receiving an under-rotation call on her triple Lutz-triple toe loop combination and placed fourth, with two points separating her from the skaters in the top three. Pinzarrone expressed disappointment afterward and said that she was having issues with her boots that were causing inflammation in her foot. She placed third in the free skate after receiving under-rotation and quarter rotation calls on six of her jumps, and she moved up into third place overall to win her second consecutive European bronze medal. Pinzarrone said that she wanted to work on her jump rotation ahead of the 2025 World Championships but that she was "thrilled" to have won bronze.

Ahead of the World Championships at the end of March, Pinzarrone continued to be bothered by inflammation and pain in her right ankle, for which she received treatment. At the World Championships, she placed eighth in the short program and seventh in the free skate, finishing seventh place overall. With this placement, Pinzarrone earned two berths for Belgian women singles skaters to compete at the 2026 Winter Olympics. She said that she was satisfied with her performance, especially as she struggled to remember her choreography during the beginning of the program due to the loud crowd, and that she was happy that Hendrickx could join her at the Olympics.

In early May, Pinzarrone fractured a foot during training and had to take time off to recover. Her coach speculated that her foot may have been weakened after her issues earlier in the season with inflammation.

=== 2025–26 season: Injury and comeback, Milano Cortina Olympics and World bronze medal ===
Although Pinzarrone was initially assigned to compete at 2025 Skate Canada International and 2025 NHK Trophy, she ultimately withdrew from both events due to multiple injuries and surgery.

In late November, she returned to competition at the 2026 Belgian Championships, winning the national title for a third time. A couple weeks later, Pinzarrone finished seventh at the 2025 CS Golden Spin of Zagreb.

In January, Pinzarrone placed second in the short program at the 2026 European Championships, then dropped to fourth after the free skate. Pinzarrone expressed disappointment over her result, but said, "I'm still going home with a good placement. My confidence is coming back more and more. I know I need to practice more." Regarding the upcoming 2026 Winter Olympics, she said: "I don't really know what to expect, but I'm so excited about it! Maybe it's my only chance in my career—I mean, I hope not—but I will do my very best for this event."

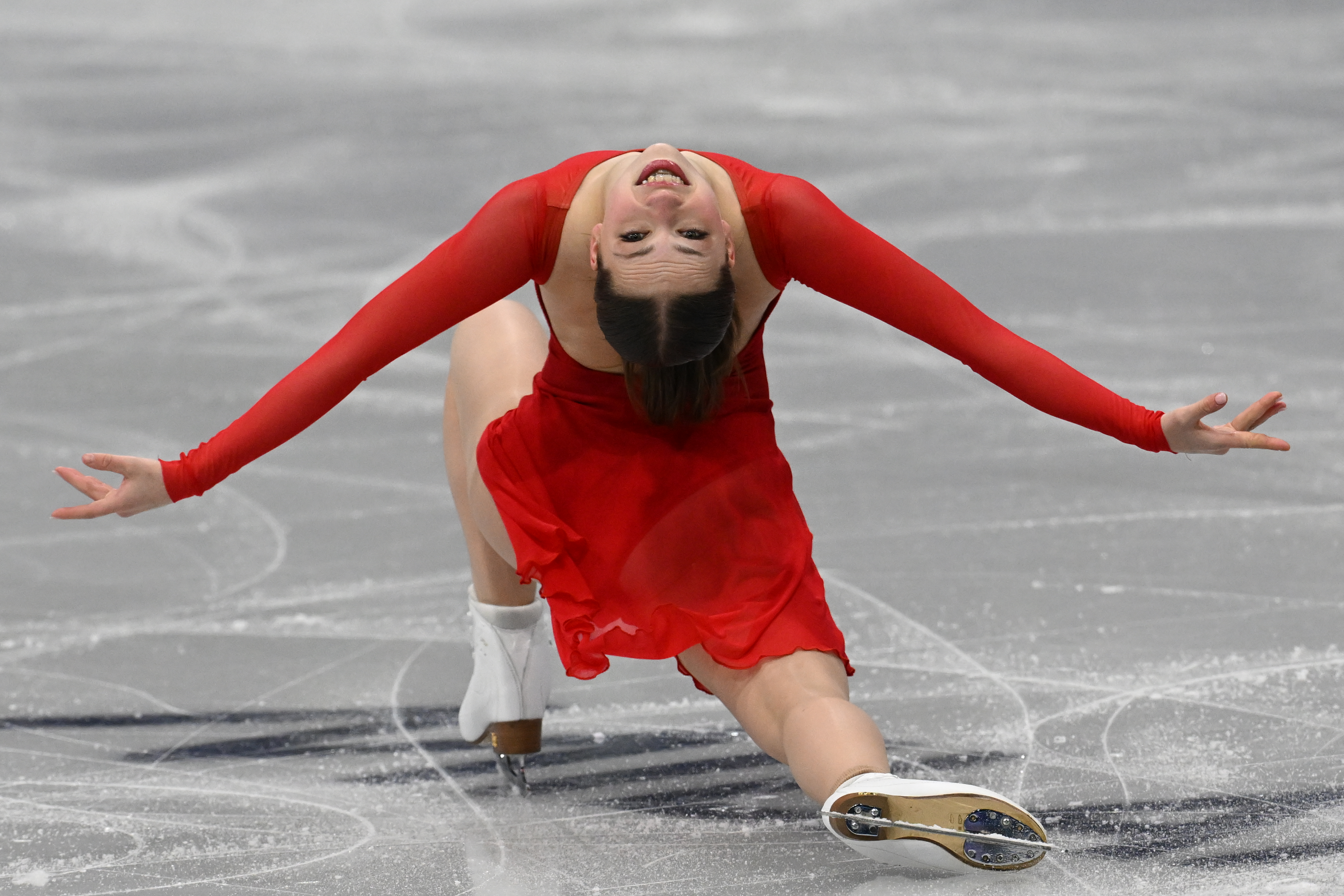
Pinzarrone performing a lunge during her free program at the 2026 Winter Olympics

On 17 February, Pinzarrone competed in the short program segment at the 2026 Winter Olympics, placing eleventh. "I was so happy at the end of my performance," she said after her short program. "I think everyone could see it. I really wanted to enjoy the moment. Skating in this stadium was something very special, and seeing the Olympic rings made it even more special." Two days later, she placed fourteenth in the free skate segment and finished thirteenth overall. "I'm super relieved and just super happy that I could put out a performance like that with all the nerves going on backstage," she remarked following her free skate performance. "I was really scared I wouldn't be able to enjoy it, but I really enjoyed every moment. I fought until the end. Even though I was almost falling, I kept battling inside to pick up all the points possible. I scored overall 15 points higher than at Europeans, so that's already a big step forward. I just want to do more. I know I can do better, but considering everything behind it, I can be pleased with my performance."

The following month, Pinzarrone competed at the 2026 World Champhionships in Prague, Czech Republic. After placing fifth in the short program, she finished third place after the free skate to win the bronze medal, earning new personal best scores in all competition segments. "If you had told me a few months ago that I would be here right now, I wouldn’t have believed it," said Pinzarrone following the event. "It was so hard at times. I didn’t even know if I would be able to go to Europeans, the Olympics, and Worlds. Only in the last two months I could really train without pain, and those two months pushed me to where I am now."

=== 2026–27 season: Coaching change ===
Heading into the season, Pinzarrone announced that she had left her long-time coach, Ans Bocklandt, and had moved to Colorado Springs, United States to train under Damon Allen, Tammy Gambill, and Logan Giulietti-Schmitt. She remarked that this was a "difficult decision": "Ans shaped me into the athlete I am today, and I have a lot of respect for her. But I needed a change, a new way of working, a new environment."

Pinzarrone opened the competitive season by placing sixth at the 2026 CS Lombardia Trophy. Pinzarrone later went onto compete on the Grand Prix series, her first event being the 2026 Grand Prix de France where she would finish in ninth place overall after struggling with her jumping passes throughout both program segments.

In November, it was announced that Pinzarrone had left Colorado Springs and had departed from Damon Allen and his coaching team, in favour of returning to train in Belgium. Her mother later stated that Allen was often absent due to personal and other issues, leading to a lack of coordination among her team members, and that an unspecified person around her had "unacceptable behavior". She added that while Pinzarrone had made a number of friends in Colorado Springs, she struggled with the altitude as well. She began training in Deurne under Jorik Hendrickx, the older brother of fellow Belgian skater and former rival to Pinzarrone, Loena Hendrickx.

== Programs ==
Season	Short program	Free skating	Exhibition
2026–2027	Por una cabeza (from Scent of a Woman) performed by The Tango Project; Payadora by Aníbal Troilo choreo. by Logan Giulietti-Schmitt	Project Hail Mary by Daniel Pemberton choreo. by Logan Giulietti-Schmitt	
2025–2026	Send In the Clowns (from A Little Night Music) by Stephen Sondheim performed by Susan Boyle choreo. by Benoît Richaud	Escapes Within (from The Handmaid's Tale) by Adam Taylor & Elisabeth Moss; Nocturne in D-flat Major "Un rêve" by Eric Christian von Fricken choreo. by Benoît Richaud; Interstellar; Interstellar (Main Theme Piano) performed by Gacabe & Jecabe; Interstellar (Main Theme); Message from Home; No Time for Caution by Hans Zimmer choreo. by Benoît Richaud	Interstellar; Beautiful Memories by Max P. Gómez; Interstellar (Main Theme Piano) performed by Gacabe & Jecabe; Interstellar (Main Theme); Message from Home; No Time for Caution by Hans Zimmer choreo. by Benoît Richaud
2024–2025	Swan Lake by Pyotr Ilyich Tchaikovsky performed by Peter Cavallo choreo. by Benoît Richaud	Escapes Within (from The Handmaid's Tale) by Adam Taylor & Elisabeth Moss; Nocturne in D-flat Major "Un rêve" by Eric Christian von Fricken choreo. by Benoît Richaud	Be Brave by My Brightest Diamond choreo. by Benoît Richaud
2023–2024	Charms (from W.E.) by Abel Korzeniowski choreo. by Benoît Richaud	Adagio of Spartacus and Phrygia; The Via Appia and Dance of the Shepherd and Shepherdess (from Spartacus) by Aram Khachaturian performed by André Rieu choreo. by Benoît Richaud	Méditation (from Thaïs) by Jules Massenet choreo. by Benoît Richaud
2022–2023	Méditation (from Thaïs) by Jules Massenet choreo. by Benoît Richaud	Buon giorno principessa by Nicola Piovani; Beautiful That Way (from Life Is Beautiful) by Noa and Nicola Piovani; La vie est belle by André Rieu choreo. by Benoît Richaud	
2021–2022	I Will Wait for You (from The Umbrellas of Cherbourg) by Michel Legrand & Norman Gimbel choreo. by Benoît Richaud	Benediction and Dream; The Floating Bed; Solo Tú (from Frida) by Elliot Goldenthal choreo. by Benoît Richaud	

== Competitive highlights ==
- GP – Event of the ISU Grand Prix Series
- JGP – Event of the ISU Junior Grand Prix Series
- CS – Event of the ISU Challenger Series
- TBD – Assigned
- WD – Withdrew from competition

Competition placements at senior level
Season	2022–23	2023–24	2024–25	2025–26	2026–27
Winter Olympics				13th	
World Championships	11th	15th	7th	3rd	
European Championships	5th	3rd	3rd	4th	
Grand Prix Final		4th			
Belgian Championships		1st	1st	1st	
GP France		2nd	6th		9th
GP NHK Trophy		3rd			
GP Skate America			4th		WD
CS Golden Spin of Zagreb	WD		2nd	7th	
CS Lombardia Trophy		9th			6th
CS Nepela Memorial					6th
CS Tallinn Trophy			1st		
Challenge Cup	4th				
Latvia Trophy	2nd				
Shanghai Trophy		4th			

Competition placements at junior level
Season	2019–20	2020–21	2021–22
World Junior Championships			11th
Belgian Championships	1st		1st
JGP France			6th
JGP Slovenia			5th
Challenge Cup			7th
Coupe du Printemps			2nd
Dragon Trophy			1st
Egna Spring Trophy		1st	
IceLab Cup			1st
Santa Claus Cup			1st
Skate Helena		1st	
Sofia Trophy		1st	

== Detailed results ==
ISU personal best scores in the +5/-5 GOE System
Segment	Type	Score	Event
Total	TSS	215.20	2026 World Championships
Short program	TSS	71.82	2026 World Championships
Short program	TES	39.18	2026 World Championships
Short program	PCS	32.64	2026 World Championships
Free skating	TSS	143.38	2026 World Championships
Free skating	TES	74.92	2026 World Championships
Free skating	PCS	68.46	2026 World Championships

- Small medals for the short program and free skating are only awarded at ISU Championships.

=== Senior level ===
Results in the 2022–23 season
Date	Event	SP		FS		Total	
Date	Event	P	Score	P	Score	P	Score
Dec 7–10, 2022	(Croatia) 2022 CS Golden Spin of Zagreb	20	44.79	—N/a	—N/a	–	WD
Dec 16–18, 2022	2022 Latvia Trophy	3	58.28	2	111.00	2	169.28
Jan 25–29, 2023	(Finland) 2023 European Championships	6	61.35	5	124.57	5	185.92
Feb 23–26, 2023	(Netherlands) 2023 International Challenge Cup	3	62.99	4	128.21	4	191.20
Mar 22–26, 2023	(Japan) 2023 World Championships	14	62.04	10	129.74	11	191.78

Results in the 2023–24 season
Date	Event	SP		FS		Total	
Date	Event	P	Score	P	Score	P	Score
Sep 8–10, 2023	(Italy) 2023 CS Lombardia Trophy	12	47.41	6	108.02	9	155.43
Oct 3–5, 2023	(China) 2023 Shanghai Trophy	4	59.21	4	121.85	4	181.06
Nov 3–5, 2023	2023 Grand Prix de France	4	65.74	2	133.06	2	198.80
Nov 17–18, 2023	(Belgium) 2024 Belgian Championships	1	66.65	1	129.98	1	196.63
Nov 24–26, 2023	(Japan) 2023 NHK Trophy	2	63.44	2	131.22	3	194.66
Dec 7–10, 2023	(China) 2023–24 Grand Prix Final	3	66.72	5	128.19	4	194.91
Jan 10–14, 2024	(Lithuania) 2024 European Championships	2	69.70	3	132.59	3	202.29
Mar 18–24, 2024	(Canada) 2024 World Championships	11	64.04	16	113.42	15	177.46

Results in the 2024–25 season
Date	Event	SP		FS		Total	
Date	Event	P	Score	P	Score	P	Score
Oct 18–20, 2024	(United States) 2024 Skate America	5	62.85	2	130.76	4	193.61
Nov 1–3, 2024	2024 Grand Prix de France	6	62.72	6	121.95	6	184.67
Nov 11-17, 2024	(Estonia) 2024 CS Tallinn Trophy	1	65.43	1	127.05	1	192.48
Dec 5–7, 2024	(Croatia) 2024 CS Golden Spin of Zagreb	3	65.20	2	128.29	2	193.49
Jan 17–18, 2025	(Belgium) 2025 Belgian Championships	1	65.27	1	127.98	1	193.25
Jan 28 – Feb 2, 2025	(Estonia) 2025 European Championships	4	66.80	3	124.64	3	191.44
Mar 25–30	(United States) 2025 World Championships	8	67.74	7	131.69	7	199.43

Results in the 2025–26 season
Date	Event	SP		FS		Total	
Date	Event	P	Score	P	Score	P	Score
Nov 21–22, 2025	(Belgium) 2026 Belgian Championships	1	54.83	1	125.12	1	179.95
Dec 3–6, 2025	(Croatia) 2025 CS Golden Spin of Zagreb	2	61.30	9	106.11	7	167.41
Jan 13–18, 2026	(United Kingdom) 2026 European Championships	2	64.97	8	120.43	4	185.40
Feb 17–19, 2026	(Italy) 2026 Winter Olympics	11	68.97	14	131.33	13	200.30
Mar 24–29, 2026	(Czech Republic) 2026 World Championships	5	71.82	3	143.38	3	215.20

Results in the 2026–27 season
Date	Event	SP		FS		Total	
Date	Event	P	Score	P	Score	P	Score
Sep 17–20, 2026	(Italy) 2026 CS Lombardia Trophy	10	56.05	6	114.87	6	170.92
Sep 24–27, 2026	(Slovakia) 2026 CS Nepela Memorial	7	58.84	6	106.05	6	164.89
Oct 23-25, 2026	2026 Grand Prix de France	7	63.19	10	98.96	9	162.15

=== Junior level ===
Results in the 2019–20 season
Date	Event	SP		FS		Total	
Date	Event	P	Score	P	Score	P	Score
Nov 22–23, 2019	(Belgium) 2020 Belgian Championships (Junior)	1	54.30	1	97.21	1	151.51

Results in the 2020–21 season
Date	Event	SP		FS		Total	
Date	Event	P	Score	P	Score	P	Score
Feb 26 – Mar 3, 2021	(Bulgaria) 2021 Sofia Trophy	1	63.82	1	123.08	1	186.90
Apr 14–18, 2021	(Serbia) 2021 Skate Helena	1	61.89	1	106.40	1	168.29
Apr 29 – May 2, 2021	(Italy) 2021 Egna Spring Trophy	2	54.58	1	97.59	1	152.17

Results in the 2021–22 season
Date	Event	SP		FS		Total	
Date	Event	P	Score	P	Score	P	Score
Aug 25–28, 2021	2021 JGP France II	5	58.40	6	104.68	6	163.08
Sep 22–25, 2021	2021 JGP Slovenia	5	64.58	6	121.52	5	186.10
Nov 19–20, 2021	(Belgium) 2022 Belgian Championships (Junior)	1	59.77	1	116.11	1	175.88
Dec 6–12, 2021	(Hungary) 2021 Santa Claus Cup	1	63.67	2	108.13	1	171.80
Jan 13–14, 2022	(Norway) 2022 IceLab International Cup	1	58.54	1	108.09	1	166.63
Feb 11–13, 2022	(Slovenia) 2022 Dragon Trophy	1	62.85	1	100.43	1	163.28
Feb 24–27, 2022	(Netherlands) 2022 International Challenge Cup	4	51.91	7	89.75	7	141.66
Mar 18–20, 2022	(Luxembourg) 2022 Coupe du Printemps	1	56.64	2	105.77	2	162.41
Apr 13–17, 2022	(Estonia) 2022 World Junior Championships	7	63.67	16	98.25	11	161.92
