= Barbara Klerk =

Belgian former competitive figure skater (born 1996)

Personal information
- Born: 20 July 1989 (age 36) Eindhoven, Netherlands
- Height: 1.63 m (5 ft 4 in)

Figure skating career
- Country: Belgium
- Skating club: Nieuw Luna Lommel
- Began skating: 1998
- Retired: 2009

Barbara Klerk (born 20 July 1989) is a Belgian former competitive figure skater. She is a two-time Belgian national champion.

== Programs ==
Season	Short program	Free skating
2008–2009	Mac Arthur Park by Jimmy Webb	La traviata by Giuseppe Verdi
2006–2008	Tosca by Giacomo Puccini performed by Maksim Mrvica	La traviata by Giuseppe Verdi
2005–2006	Bamboleo by T. Baliardo, J. Bouchikkim, S. Dias	Doctor Zhivago by Maurice Jarre

== Competitive highlights ==
JGP: Junior Grand Prix

International
Event	2003–04	2004–05	2005–06	2006–07	2007–08	2008–09
World Champ.					43rd	
European Champ.					32nd	
NRW Trophy					2nd J.	14th
International: Junior
Junior Worlds				40th	34th	
JGP Austria					16th	
JGP Germany					11th	
JGP Italy						32nd
JGP Poland			16th			
EYOF		14th				
National
Belgian Champ.	4th J.	1st J.	2nd	3rd	1st	1st
J. = Junior level
