= 2012 European Figure Skating Championships =

Figure skating competition

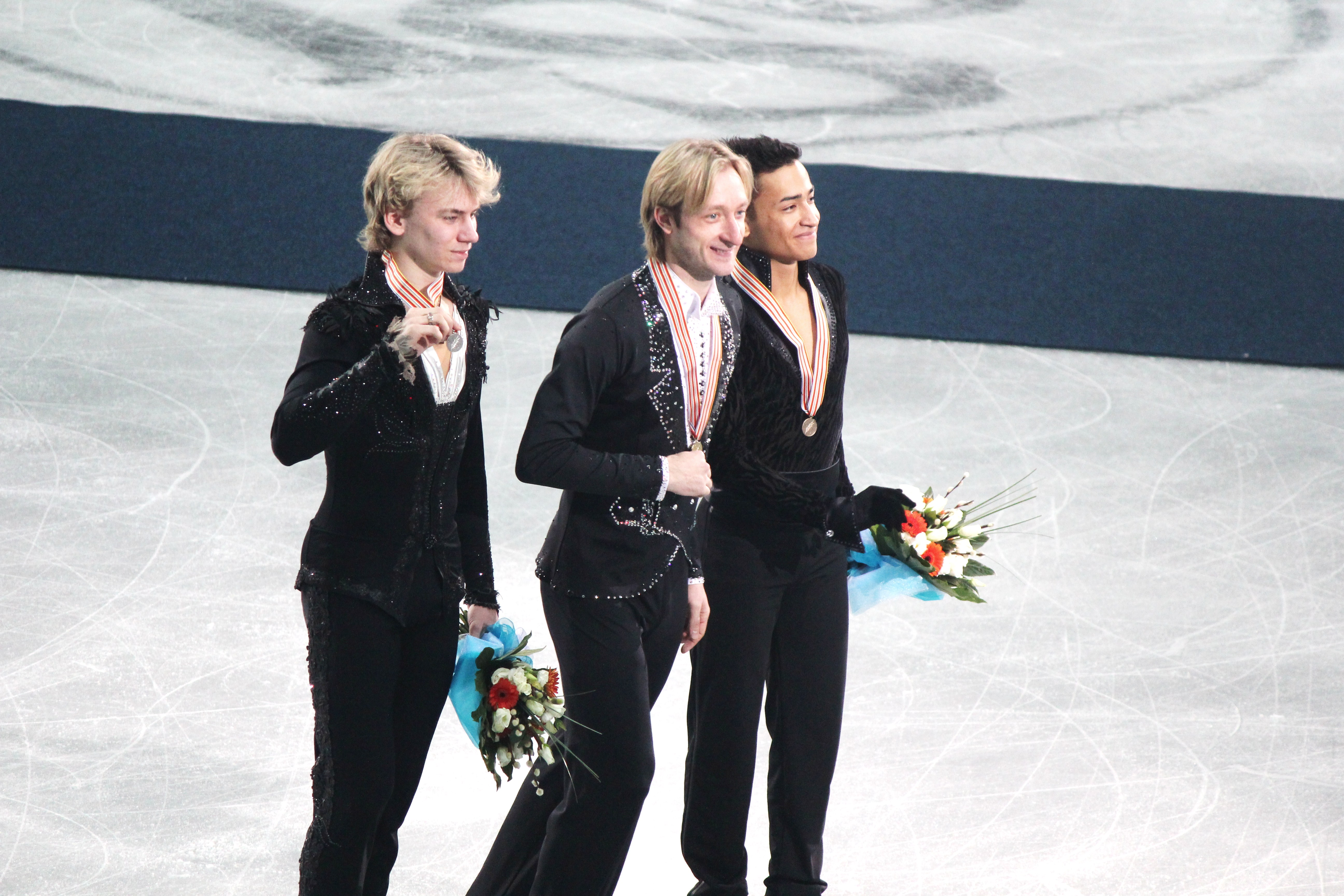
- The 2012 medalists in the men's event
- Type: ISU Championship
- Date: 23 – 29 January
- Season: 2011–12
- Location: Sheffield, England, United Kingdom
- Host: NISA
- Venue: Sheffield Arena

Champions
- Men's singles: (Russia) Evgeni Plushenko
- Ladies' singles: (Italy) Carolina Kostner
- Pairs: (Russia) Tatiana Volosozhar / Maxim Trankov
- Ice dance: (France) Nathalie Péchalat / Fabian Bourzat
- Previous: 2011 European Championships
- Next: 2013 European Championships

The 2012 European Figure Skating Championships was an international figure skating competition in the 2011–12 season. The event determined the European Champions in men's singles, ladies singles, pair skating, and ice dancing. The competition was held from 23 to 29 January 2012 in Sheffield, Great Britain.

== Qualification ==
Skaters were eligible for the event if they were representing a European member nations of the International Skating Union and had reached the age of 15 before 1 July 2011 in their place of birth. The corresponding competition for non-European skaters was the 2012 Four Continents Championships. National associations selected their entries according to their own criteria but the ISU mandated that their selections achieve a minimum technical elements score (TES) at an international event prior to the European Championships.

=== Minimum TES ===
Minimum technical scores (TES)
Discipline	SP / SD	FS / FD
Men	20	35
Ladies	15	25
Pairs	17	30
Ice dance	17	27
Must be achieved at an ISU-recognized international event in the ongoing or preceding season. SP and FS scores may be attained at different events.

=== Number of entries per discipline ===
Based on the results of the 2011 European Championships, the ISU allowed each country one to three entries per discipline.

Spots	Men	Ladies	Pairs	Dance
3	France; Czech Republic; Russia	Italy; Russia	Germany; Russia	France; Russia
2	Belgium; Italy; Sweden; Spain	Switzerland; Finland; Sweden; Belgium; France	Italy; Czech Republic (United Kingdom) Great Britain; France; Belarus	Italy; Germany; Hungary; Czech Republic; Ukraine (United Kingdom) Great Britain
If not listed above, one entry was allowed.

== Entries ==
Some skaters were required to compete in a preliminary round, while others received a direct entry into the short program, after which the number of entries might be reduced further. If a country had a non-direct entry, its lowest-ranked skater according to the Worlds Standings competed in the preliminary round.

	Number of skaters			
Discipline	Pre.	Dir.	SP	FS
Men	18	18	28	24
Ladies	23	18	28	24
Pairs			19	16
Ice dance	19	12	20	20
Pre. = Preliminary round; Dir. = Direct entry; SP = Short program; FS = Free skating

Member states submitted the following entries:

Country	Men	Ladies	Pairs	Ice dancing
Armenia	Sarkis Hayrapetyan			
Austria	Viktor Pfeifer	Kerstin Frank	Stina Martini / Severin Kiefer	Barbora Silná / Juri Kurakin
Belgium	Kevin van der Perren; Jorik Hendrickx	Isabelle Pieman; Kaat Van Daele		
Czech Republic	Tomáš Verner; Michal Březina; Pavel Kaška	Eliška Březinová	Klára Kadlecová / Petr Bidař; Alexandra Herbríková / Rudy Halmaert	Gabriela Kubová / Dmitri Kiselev; Lucie Myslivečková / Neil Brown
Estonia	Viktor Romanenkov	Jelena Glebova		Irina Shtork / Taavi Rand
Finland	Ari-Pekka Nurmenkari	Kiira Korpi; Juulia Turkkila		Henna Lindholm / Ossi Kanervo
France	Brian Joubert; Florent Amodio; Chafik Besseghier	Maé Bérénice Méité; Yrétha Silété	Vanessa James / Morgan Ciprès; Daria Popova / Bruno Massot	Nathalie Péchalat / Fabian Bourzat; Pernelle Carron / Lloyd Jones; Tiffany Zahorski / Alexis Miart
Georgia		Elene Gedevanishvili		
Germany	Peter Liebers; Paul Fentz	Sarah Hecken	Aliona Savchenko / Robin Szolkowy; Maylin Hausch / Daniel Wende; Mari Vartmann / Aaron Van Cleave	Nelli Zhiganshina / Alexander Gazsi; Tanja Kolbe / Stefano Caruso
(United Kingdom) Great Britain	Jason Thompson	Jenna McCorkell	Sally Hoolin / James Hunt; Stacey Kemp / David King	Penny Coomes / Nicholas Buckland; Louise Walden / Owen Edwards
Hungary	Márton Markó	Viktória Pavuk		Zsuzsanna Nagy / Máté Fejes; Dóra Turóczi / Balázs Major
Ireland		Clara Peters		
Israel	Alexei Bychenko		Danielle Montalbano / Evgeni Krasnopolski	Ekaterina Bugrov / Vasili Rogov
Italy	Paolo Bacchini; Samuel Contesti	Carolina Kostner; Valentina Marchei; Francesca Rio	Stefania Berton / Ondřej Hotárek; Carolina Gillespie / Luca Demattè	Anna Cappellini / Luca Lanotte; Charlène Guignard / Marco Fabbri
Lithuania		Rimgailė Meškaitė		Isabella Tobias / Deividas Stagniūnas
Poland	Maciej Cieplucha			Alexandra Zvorygina / Maciej Bernadowski
Romania	Zoltán Kelemen	Sabina Măriuţă		
Russia	Artur Gachinski; Evgeni Plushenko; Sergei Voronov	Alena Leonova; Ksenia Makarova; Polina Korobeynikova	Tatiana Volosozhar / Maxim Trankov; Ksenia Stolbova / Fedor Klimov; Vera Bazarova / Yuri Larionov	Ekaterina Bobrova / Dmitri Soloviev; Elena Ilinykh / Nikita Katsalapov; Ekaterina Riazanova / Ilia Tkachenko
Slovakia		Monika Simančíková		
Spain	Javier Fernández; Javier Raya	Sonia Lafuente		Sara Hurtado / Adrià Díaz
Sweden	Alexander Majorov; Adrian Schultheiss	Joshi Helgesson; Viktoria Helgesson	Michelle Lundberg / Richard Lundberg	
Ukraine	Stanislav Pertsov	Natalia Popova		Nadezhda Frolenkova / Mikhail Kasalo; Siobhan Heekin-Canedy / Dmitri Dun

In January 2012, the ISU released a statement confirming that Evgeni Plushenko, who did not have a minimum score from the current or previous season, had been allowed to participate in the competition.

== Schedule ==
(Local time, UTC/GMT):

- Monday 23 January
  - 15:00–18:05 – Preliminary round: Ice dancing
  - 18:30–21:35 – Preliminary round: Men
- Tuesday 24 January
  - 14:00–17:45 – Preliminary round: Ladies
- Wednesday 25 January
  - 14:00–16:55 – Pairs' short
  - 17:45–18:00 – Opening ceremony
  - 18:30–21:25 – Short dance
- Thursday 26 January
  - 13:00–17:10 – Men's short
  - 18:30–21:30 – Pairs' free
- Friday 27 January
  - 13:00–17:10 – Ladies' short
  - 18:00–21:20 – Free dance
- Saturday 28 January
  - 11:55–16:00 – Men's free
  - 17:30–21:25 – Ladies' free
- Sunday 29 January
  - 13:30–16:00 – Exhibitions

== Overview ==
2012 was the first time in more than twenty years that Great Britain organized the European Championships. Robin Cousins choreographed the opening ceremony featuring 100 young local skaters and attended by Prince Edward.

Evgeni Plushenko won the preliminary round. The top 11 skaters advanced from the preliminary round to the short program, joining 17 direct entries. Jason Thompson who placed 13th also advanced as the representative of the host country. Artur Gachinski narrowly won the short program ahead of Plushenko. Plushenko won the free skate and took his seventh European title, while Gachinski took the silver and France's Florent Amodio won the bronze.

23 ladies competed in the preliminary round, with the top ten advancing to the short program to join 18 direct entries. Polina Korobeynikova was the winner of the preliminary round. The top three in the short program were Carolina Kostner, Kiira Korpi and Ksenia Makarova. In the free skate, Kostner placed first, followed by Korobeynikova, and Elene Gedevanishvili. Kostner won her fourth European title. Kiira Korpi took silver, her third European medal, and Gedevanishvili won her second bronze.

Russia's Yuko Kavaguti / Alexander Smirnov withdrew as a result of an emergency surgery the previous week to remove Smirnov's appendix and Ksenia Stolbova / Fedor Klimov took their place. No preliminary round was held because there were only 19 teams in total. Germany's Aliona Savchenko / Robin Szolkowy withdrew before the short program due to injury. Russia's Tatiana Volosozhar / Maxim Trankov won the short. Germany's Mari Vartmann / Daniel Wende collided with each other while attempting to avoid a French couple during the morning practice before the long programs on 26 January. Volosozhar / Trankov won the free skate to take their first European title, while Vera Bazarova / Yuri Larionov and Stolbova / Klimov took silver and bronze respectively for a Russian sweep of the podium.

19 teams competed in the ice dancing preliminary round, with the top eight advancing to the short dance to join 12 direct entries. Julia Zlobina / Alexei Sitnikov were first in the preliminary round. Ekaterina Bobrova / Dmitri Soloviev, Nathalie Pechalat / Fabian Bourzat, and Ekaterina Riazanova / Ilia Tkachenko were the top three in the short dance. Pechalat / Bourzat won the free dance to take their second European title, Bobrova / Soloviev repeated as silver medalists, and Elena Ilinykh / Nikita Katsalapov won bronze, their first time on the podium.

== Results ==
=== Men ===
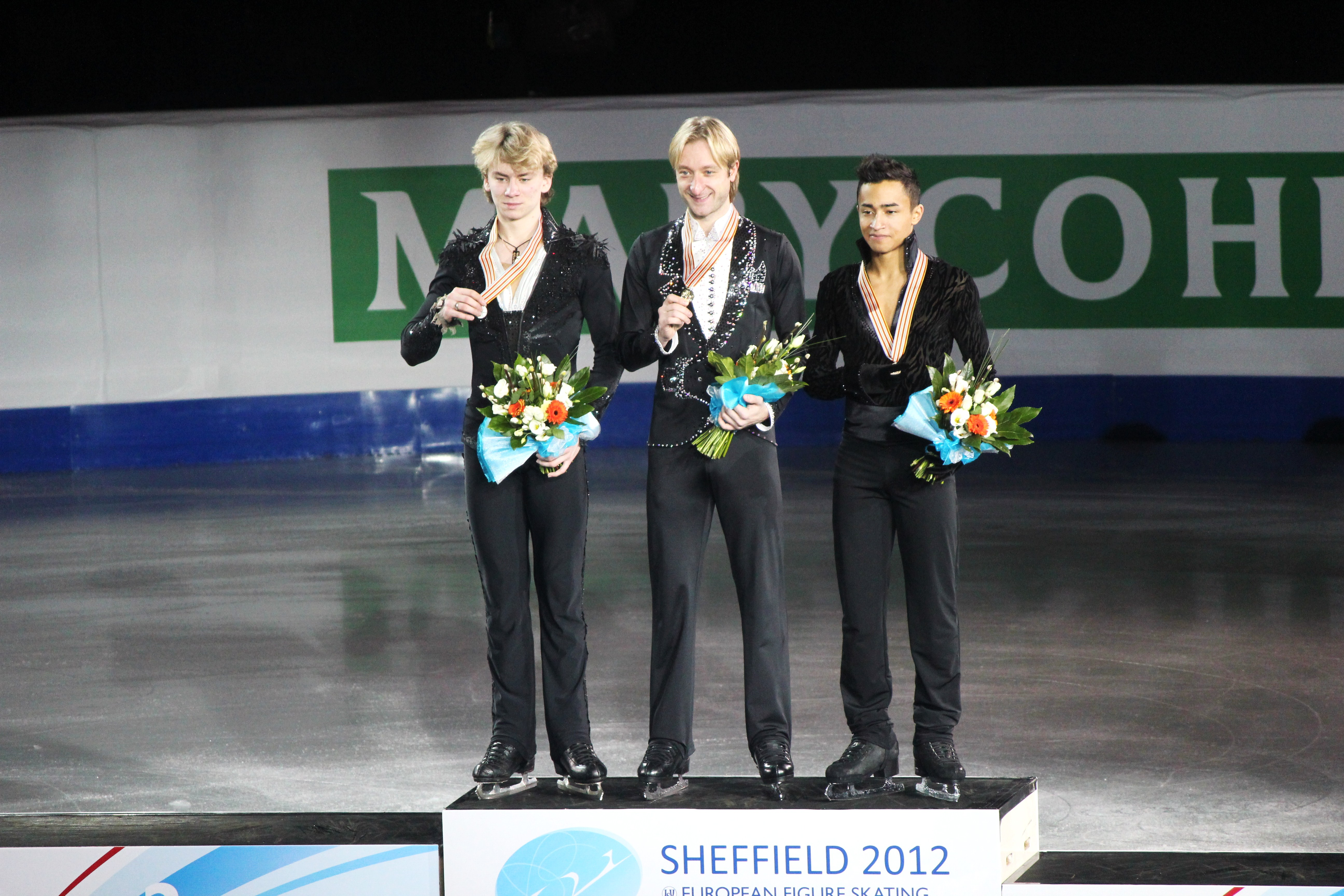
The men's podium

Rank	Name	Nation	Total points	PR		SP		FS	
1	Evgeni Plushenko	Russia	261.23	1	157.52	2	84.71	1	176.52
2	Artur Gachinski	Russia	246.27			1	84.80	2	161.47
3	Florent Amodio	France	234.18			5	78.48	3	155.70
4	Michal Březina	Czech Republic	229.30			6	76.13	4	153.17
5	Tomáš Verner	Czech Republic	225.36			3	81.14	6	144.22
6	Javier Fernández	Spain	222.26			4	80.11	7	142.15
7	Samuel Contesti	Italy	212.32			11	66.86	5	145.46
8	Brian Joubert	France	207.83			10	67.92	8	139.91
9	Jorik Hendrickx	Belgium	204.63			8	68.98	9	135.65
10	Sergei Voronov	Russia	195.89			14	60.88	10	135.01
11	Alexander Majorov	Sweden	193.18			9	68.33	11	124.85
12	Chafik Besseghier	France	181.85			12	63.12	13	118.73
13	Kim Lucine	Monaco	179.33			16	57.64	12	121.69
14	Zoltán Kelemen	Romania	178.02	2	114.64	15	60.12	14	117.90
15	Peter Liebers	Germany	176.75			13	61.08	16	115.67
16	Paolo Bacchini	Italy	169.40			17	55.77	18	114.34
17	Paul Fentz	Germany	169.40	4	107.92	23	51.74	15	117.66
18	Viktor Pfeifer	Austria	168.92			21	53.58	17	115.34
19	Maciej Cieplucha	Poland	166.86	3	108.53	20	54.17	19	112.69
20	Justus Strid	Denmark	156.33	6	103.04	18	54.71	21	101.62
21	Dmytro Ihnatenko	Ukraine	154.88			24	51.61	20	103.27
22	Alexei Bychenko	Israel	141.19	5	106.19	19	54.69	22	86.50
23	Viktor Romanenkov	Estonia	135.09	8	95.86	22	52.24	23	82.85
WD	Kevin van der Perren	Belgium				7	71.05		
Did not advance to free skating
25	Jason Thompson	(United Kingdom) Great Britain		13	89.63	25	51.42		
26	Pavel Kaška	Czech Republic		11	93.10	26	51.34		
27	Vitali Luchanok	Belarus		7	98.28	27	48.32		
28	Slavik Hayrapetyan	Armenia		10	93.19	28	45.75		
29	Ali Demirboga	Turkey		9	93.99	29	45.54		
Did not advance to short program
30	Laurent Alvarez	Switzerland		12	90.70				
31	Márton Markó	Hungary		14	85.41				
32	Manol Atanassov	Bulgaria		15	81.07				
WD	Ari-Pekka Nurmenkari	Finland							

=== Ladies ===
Rank	Name	Nation	Total points	PR		SP		FS	
1	Carolina Kostner	Italy	183.55			1	63.22	1	120.33
2	Kiira Korpi	Finland	166.94			2	61.80	4	105.14
3	Elene Gedevanishvili	Georgia	165.93			4	57.14	3	108.79
4	Polina Korobeynikova	Russia	164.13	1	109.73	12	49.41	2	114.72
5	Viktoria Helgesson	Sweden	160.82			5	55.68	5	105.14
6	Ksenia Makarova	Russia	159.59			3	57.55	7	102.04
7	Alena Leonova	Russia	158.78			6	54.50	6	104.28
8	Valentina Marchei	Italy	146.84			7	53.52	9	93.32
9	Yrétha Silété	France	145.50	4	90.38	8	52.75	11	92.75
10	Joshi Helgesson	Sweden	145.11	2	96.27	9	52.32	10	92.79
11	Jelena Glebova	Estonia	141.92			10	52.32	13	89.60
12	Natalia Popova	Ukraine	138.60	5	88.70	19	43.75	8	94.85
13	Maé Bérénice Méité	France	137.33			11	49.86	15	87.47
14	Monika Simančíková	Slovakia	136.79	3	91.99	14	46.39	12	90.40
15	Sonia Lafuente	Spain	133.64			13	47.34	16	86.30
16	Alina Fjodorova	Latvia	133.48	6	87.82	18	44.37	14	89.11
17	Juulia Turkkila	Finland	130.33			15	45.65	17	84.68
18	Jenna McCorkell	(United Kingdom) Great Britain	125.41			16	45.32	19	80.09
19	Isabelle Pieman	Belgium	122.13			17	44.39	20	77.74
20	Romy Bühler	Switzerland	121.25			24	38.14	18	83.11
21	Myriam Leuenberger	Switzerland	117.73			21	41.77	21	75.96
22	Nathalie Weinzierl	Germany	115.89			20	42.56	22	73.33
23	Francesca Rio	Italy	108.66	7	73.23	22	40.02	23	68.64
24	Karina Sinding Johnson	Denmark	92.12			23	38.23	24	53.89
Did not advance to free skating
25	Fleur Maxwell	Luxembourg		9	67.35	25	37.06		
26	Kaat Van Daele	Belgium		10	67.22	26	35.11		
27	Chelsea Rose Chiappa	Hungary				27	34.46		
28	Clara Peters	Ireland		8	69.92	28	30.88		
Did not advance to short program
29	Birce Atabey	Turkey		11	65.98				
30	Kerstin Frank	Austria		12	65.86				
31	Rimgailė Meškaitė	Lithuania		13	65.38				
32	Manouk Gijsman	Netherlands		14	64.07				
33	Patricia Gleščič	Slovenia		15	63.06				
34	Camilla Gjersem	Norway		16	63.04				
35	Ksenia Bakusheva	Belarus		17	61.60				
36	Eliška Březinová	Czech Republic		18	60.43				
37	Daniela Stoeva	Bulgaria		19	60.33				
38	Georgia Glastris	Greece		20	58.85				
39	Sabina Măriuţă	Romania		21	57.15				
40	Marina Seeh	Serbia		22	52.24				
41	Mirna Libric	Croatia		23	50.70				

=== Pairs ===
Rank	Name	Nation	Total points	SP		FS	
1	Tatiana Volosozhar / Maxim Trankov	Russia	210.45	1	72.80	1	137.65
2	Vera Bazarova / Yuri Larionov	Russia	193.79	2	66.89	2	126.90
3	Ksenia Stolbova / Fedor Klimov	Russia	171.81	3	58.66	3	113.15
4	Stefania Berton / Ondřej Hotárek	Italy	158.99	4	54.38	4	104.61
5	Mari Vartmann / Aaron Van Cleave	Germany	154.99	7	52.00	5	102.99
6	Vanessa James / Morgan Ciprès	France	151.93	8	51.81	6	100.12
7	Maylin Hausch / Daniel Wende	Germany	148.82	5	54.03	7	94.79
8	Daria Popova / Bruno Massot	France	139.98	6	53.91	9	86.07
9	Stacey Kemp / David King	(United Kingdom) Great Britain	138.39	9	45.75	8	92.64
10	Lubov Bakirova / Mikalai Kamianchuk	Belarus	122.25	14	39.06	10	83.19
11	Danielle Montalbano / Evgeni Krasnopolski	Israel	120.32	12	41.69	11	78.63
12	Carolina Gillespie / Luca Demattè	Italy	120.11	11	42.75	12	77.36
13	Alexandra Herbríková / Rudy Halmaert	Czech Republic	115.87	10	42.99	14	72.88
14	Anaïs Morand / Timothy Leemann	Switzerland	114.20	13	41.48	15	72.72
15	Stina Martini / Severin Kiefer	Austria	112.10	15	38.05	13	74.05
16	Sally Hoolin / James Hunt	(United Kingdom) Great Britain	94.08	16	33.41	16	60.67
Did not advance to free skating
17	Elizabeta Makarova / Leri Kenchadze	Bulgaria		17	32.80		
18	Maria Paliakova / Mikhail Fomichev	Belarus		18	28.33		
WD	Aliona Savchenko / Robin Szolkowy	Germany					

=== Ice dancing ===
Rank	Name	Nation	Total points	PR		SD		FD	
1	Nathalie Péchalat / Fabian Bourzat	France	164.18			2	64.89	1	99.29
2	Ekaterina Bobrova / Dmitri Soloviev	Russia	160.23			1	65.06	2	95.17
3	Elena Ilinykh / Nikita Katsalapov	Russia	153.12			7	59.49	3	93.63
4	Anna Cappellini / Luca Lanotte	Italy	153.09			6	59.62	4	93.47
5	Ekaterina Riazanova / Ilia Tkachenko	Russia	152.22			3	61.34	5	90.88
6	Penny Coomes / Nicholas Buckland	(United Kingdom) Great Britain	145.31			4	59.78	6	85.53
7	Pernelle Carron / Lloyd Jones	France	142.27			8	57.40	7	84.87
8	Nelli Zhiganshina / Alexander Gazsi	Germany	140.84			9	56.79	8	84.05
9	Isabella Tobias / Deividas Stagniūnas	Lithuania	139.53			5	59.66	10	79.87
10	Julia Zlobina / Alexei Sitnikov	Azerbaijan	133.04	1	81.55	11	49.66	9	83.38
11	Charlène Guignard / Marco Fabbri	Italy	129.46	2	74.34	10	52.45	11	77.01
12	Tanja Kolbe / Stefano Caruso	Germany	123.89	6	71.05	13	49.07	13	74.82
13	Louise Walden / Owen Edwards	(United Kingdom) Great Britain	122.59	4	72.75	14	48.36	14	74.23
14	Irina Shtork / Taavi Rand	Estonia	121.09	7	69.21	19	44.97	12	76.12
15	Siobhan Heekin-Canedy / Dmitri Dun	Ukraine	119.95	3	73.10	16	46.71	15	73.24
16	Sara Hurtado / Adrià Díaz	Spain	117.26	5	72.07	12	49.35	17	67.91
17	Zsuzsanna Nagy / Máté Fejes	Hungary	114.40			18	44.99	16	69.41
18	Gabriela Kubová / Dmitri Kiselev	Czech Republic	113.51			17	45.88	18	67.63
19	Lucie Myslivečková / Neil Brown	Czech Republic	111.46	8	68.68	15	47.47	19	63.99
20	Nadezhda Frolenkova / Mikhail Kasalo	Ukraine	104.74			20	42.60	20	62.14
Did not advance to short dance
21	Tiffany Zahorski / Alexis Miart	France		9	67.22				
22	Ramona Elsener / Florian Roost	Switzerland		10	67.01				
23	Dóra Turóczi / Balázs Major	Hungary		11	65.01				
24	Barbora Silná / Juri Kurakin	Austria		12	63.34				
25	Henna Lindholm / Ossi Kanervo	Finland		13	63.26				
26	Alisa Agafonova / Alper Uçar	Turkey		14	60.63				
27	Alexandra Zvorygina / Maciej Bernadowski	Poland		15	58.94				
28	Lesia Valadzenkava / Vitali Vakunov	Belarus		16	57.97				
29	Ekaterina Bugrov / Vasili Rogov	Israel		17	56.11				
30	Ksenia Pecherkina / Aleksandrs Jakushin	Latvia		18	53.93				
31	Alexandra Chistiakova / Dimitar Lichev	Bulgaria		19	45.42				

== Medals summary ==
=== Medals by country ===
Table of medals for overall placement:

Rank	Nation	Gold	Silver	Bronze	Total
1	Russia (RUS)	2	3	2	7
2	France (FRA)	1	0	1	2
3	Italy (ITA)	1	0	0	1
4	Finland (FIN)	0	1	0	1
5	Georgia (GEO)	0	0	1	1
Totals (5 entries)		4	4	4	12

Table of small medals for placement in the short segment:

Rank	Nation	Gold	Silver	Bronze	Total
1	Russia (RUS)	3	2	3	8
2	Italy (ITA)	1	0	0	1
3	Finland (FIN)	0	1	0	1
3	France (FRA)	0	1	0	1
5	Czech Republic (CZE)	0	0	1	1
Totals (5 entries)		4	4	4	12

Table of small medals for placement in the free segment:

Rank	Nation	Gold	Silver	Bronze	Total
1	Russia (RUS)	2	4	2	8
2	France (FRA)	1	0	1	2
3	Italy (ITA)	1	0	0	1
4	Georgia (GEO)	0	0	1	1
Totals (4 entries)		4	4	4	12

=== Medalists ===
Medals for overall placement:

Discipline	Gold	Silver	Bronze
Men	(Russia) Evgeni Plushenko	(Russia) Artur Gachinski	(France) Florent Amodio
Ladies	(Italy) Carolina Kostner	(Finland) Kiira Korpi	(Georgia (country)) Elene Gedevanishvili
Pair skating	(Russia) Tatiana Volosozhar / Maxim Trankov	(Russia) Vera Bazarova / Yuri Larionov	(Russia) Ksenia Stolbova / Fedor Klimov
Ice dancing	(France) Nathalie Pechalat / Fabian Bourzat	(Russia) Ekaterina Bobrova / Dmitri Soloviev	(Russia) Elena Ilinykh / Nikita Katsalapov

Small medals for placement in the short segment:

Discipline	Gold	Silver	Bronze
Men	(Russia) Artur Gachinski	(Russia) Evgeni Plushenko	(Czech Republic) Tomáš Verner
Ladies	(Italy) Carolina Kostner	(Finland) Kiira Korpi	(Russia) Ksenia Makarova
Pair skating	(Russia) Tatiana Volosozhar / Maxim Trankov	(Russia) Vera Bazarova / Yuri Larionov	(Russia) Ksenia Stolbova / Fedor Klimov
Ice dancing	(Russia) Ekaterina Bobrova / Dmitri Soloviev	(France) Nathalie Pechalat / Fabian Bourzat	(Russia) Ekaterina Riazanova / Ilia Tkachenko

Small medals for placement in the free segment:

Discipline	Gold	Silver	Bronze
Men	(Russia) Evgeni Plushenko	(Russia) Artur Gachinski	(France) Florent Amodio
Ladies	(Italy) Carolina Kostner	(Russia) Polina Korobeynikova	(Georgia (country)) Elene Gedevanishvili
Pair skating	(Russia) Tatiana Volosozhar / Maxim Trankov	(Russia) Vera Bazarova / Yuri Larionov	(Russia) Ksenia Stolbova / Fedor Klimov
Ice dancing	(France) Nathalie Pechalat / Fabian Bourzat	(Russia) Ekaterina Bobrova / Dmitri Soloviev	(Russia) Elena Ilinykh / Nikita Katsalapov
