= Isabelle Pieman =

Belgian former competitive figure skater (born 1983)

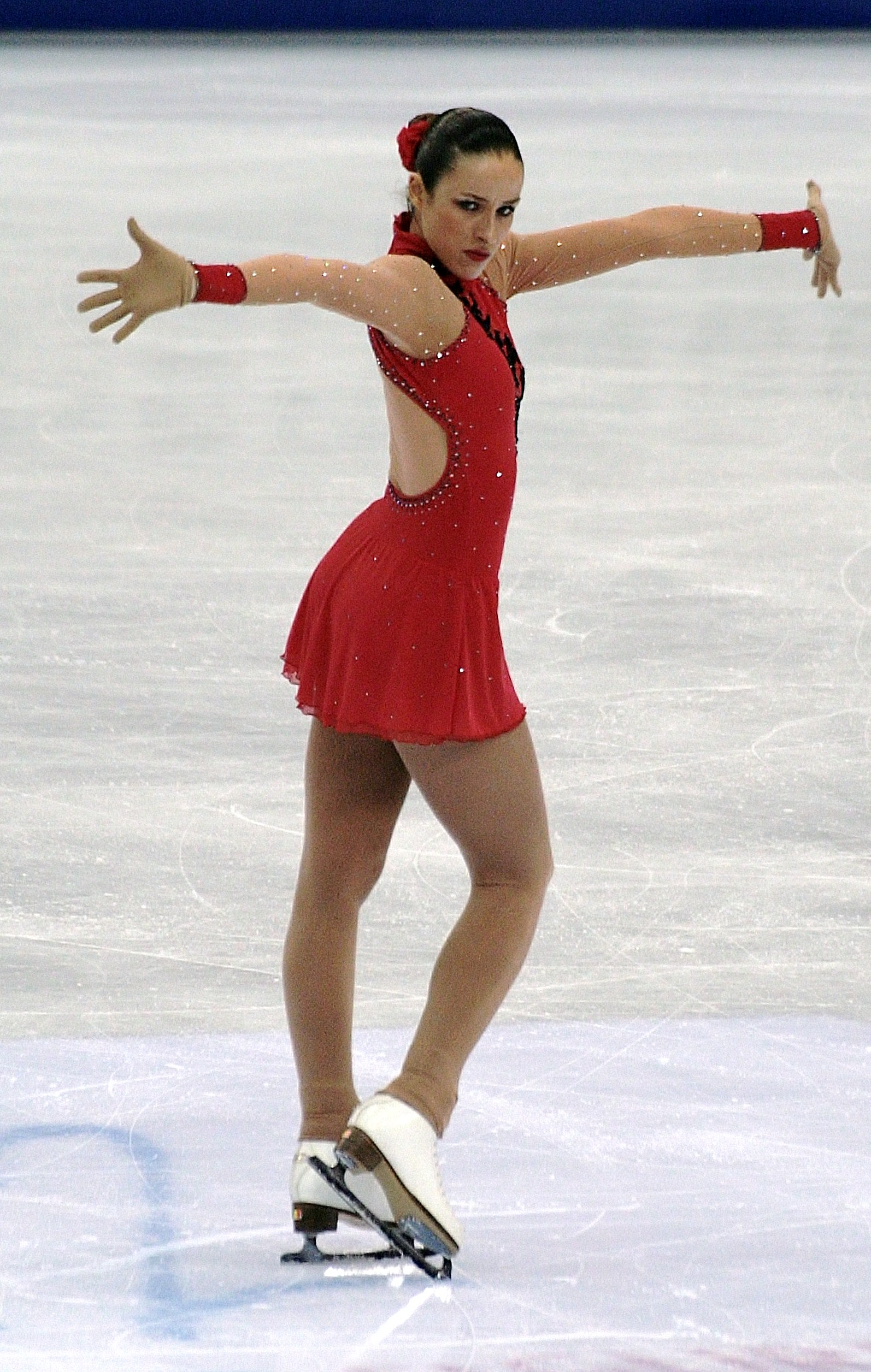
- Pieman in 2012.

Personal information
- Born: 28 September 1983 (age 43) Brussels, Belgium
- Height: 1.72 m (5 ft 8 in)

Figure skating career
- Country: Belgium
- Coach: Roberto Moschella, Badri Kurashvili, Karel Fajfr, Eran Sragowicz, C. Herrijgers, S. Schelfaut, L. van Troyen, Vera Vandecaveye, Laurent Vandenneucker
- Skating club: Royal Brussels SC
- Began skating: 1990
- Retired: 2015?

Isabelle Pieman (born 28 September 1983) is a Belgian former competitive figure skater. She won five senior international medals and three Belgian national titles (2007, 2009, 2012). At the 2009 Nebelhorn Trophy, Pieman qualified a spot for Belgium in the ladies' singles event at the 2010 Winter Olympics in Vancouver, where she placed 25th. She qualified to the free skate at the 2012 European Championships in Sheffield.

== Programs ==
Season	Short program	Free skating
2013–14	Crimson Wings	Otonal by Raúl Di Blasio
2010–12	Flamenco Selection; Cancion Triste by Jesse Cook; Eye Patch (from Once Upon a Time in Mexico)	Cathar Rhythm by Era; Mystic
2008–10	Take Five by Charlie Parker	Beyond Rangoon by Hans Zimmer
2006–07	Violin Fantasy on Puccini's Turandot performed by Vanessa-Mae	Mumbay Theme Tune by R. Rahman; Distant Lands by Armen Chakmakian
2004–05	Harem by Frank Peterson	Cirque du Soleil; Saltimbanco by Rene Dupere; Dralion by Violaine Corradi

== Results ==
International
Event	01–02	02–03	03–04	04–05	05–06	06–07	07–08	08–09	09–10	10–11	11–12	12–13	13–14
Olympics									25th				
Worlds						34th		40th	WD		26th		
Europeans				36th		32nd			33rd		19th		
Bavarian Open											14th	18th	
Challenge Cup						10th							
Crystal Skate								6th				10th	
Cup of Nice						6th					21st		
Denkova-Staviski												9th	
Finlandia Trophy													11th
Golden Bear													4th
Golden Spin							21st			16th			8th
Istanbul Cup											3rd		
Merano Cup			8th				WD						
Nebelhorn Trophy						9th	21st		11th		18th		
Nepela Memorial				WD					3rd			WD	
New Year's Cup												12th	
Schäfer Memorial								7th					
Seibt Memorial												12th	
Skate Helena												2nd	
Triglav Trophy					2nd		3rd			WD			
Volvo Open													14th
National
Belgian Champ.	5th	6th	3rd	3rd		1st	3rd	2nd	1st		1st	2nd	
WD = Withdrew
