= Kaat Van Daele =

Belgian figure skater (born 1989)

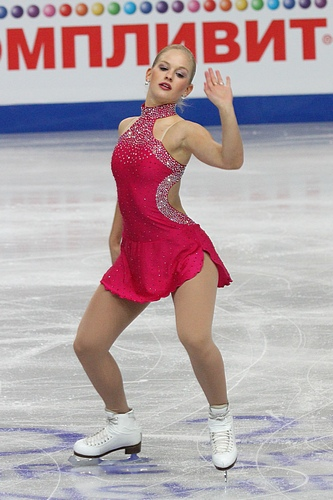
- Van Daele at the 2012 European Championships

Personal information
- Born: 24 August 1989 (age 37) Ghent, Belgium
- Height: 1.59 m (5 ft 2 1/2 in)

Figure skating career
- Country: Belgium
- Coach: Karel Fajfr
- Skating club: Heuvelkouter Liederke
- Began skating: 1997

Kaat Van Daele (born 24 August 1989) is a Belgian figure skater. She is a two-time Belgian national champion and has qualified twice for the free skate at the European Championships.

== Career ==
Van Daele began skating when she was 6 or 7 years old. She finished second at Belgian Nationals several times before winning her first title in 2013. That same season, she finished 18th at the European Championships and competed at her first World Championships, where she placed 28th.

In the 2013–14 season, Van Daele won her second national title and placed 20th at the European Championships.

== Programs ==
Season	Short program	Free skating
2013–2014	Bring Him Home by The Piano Guys	Morning (from Peer Gynt) by Edvard Grieg
2011–2013	Exogenesis Symphony by Muse	Born on the 4th of July by John Williams

== Competitive highlights ==
Results
International
Event	2005–06	2006–07	2007–08	2008–09	2009–10	2010–11	2011–12	2012–13	2013–14
Worlds								28th	28th
Europeans							26th	18th	20th
Bavarian Open						11th		21st	13th
Challenge Cup				15th J.				7th	
Cup of Nice			14th J.		21st		29th		
Gardena						14th			
Hellmut Seibt								9th	
Ice Challenge								18th	
Istanbul Cup							4th		
Lombardia									8th
Mont Blanc						10th			
Nebelhorn									22nd
NRW Trophy				7th J.	16th			16th	7th
Ondrej Nepela							10th	13th	
Printemps							4th	5th	
Warsaw Cup									13th
International: Junior
JGP Belarus				25th					
National
Belgian Champ.	7th J.	2nd J.	2nd J.	3rd	2nd	2nd	2nd	1st	1st
J. = Junior level; JGP = Junior Grand Prix
