= Fernand Leemans =

Belgian figure skater (1925–2004)

Fernand Leemans (December 13, 1925 – June 3, 2004) was a Belgian figure skater who competed in men's singles. He won the bronze medal at the European Figure Skating Championships in 1947 and finished 11th at the 1948 Winter Olympics. He was born in Brasschaat and died in Barcelona

== Results ==
| Event | 1947 | 1948 |
|---|---|---|
| Winter Olympic Games | | 11th |
| European Championships | 3rd | |
| Belgian Championships | 1st | |
