= Ernst Gaste =

German figure skater

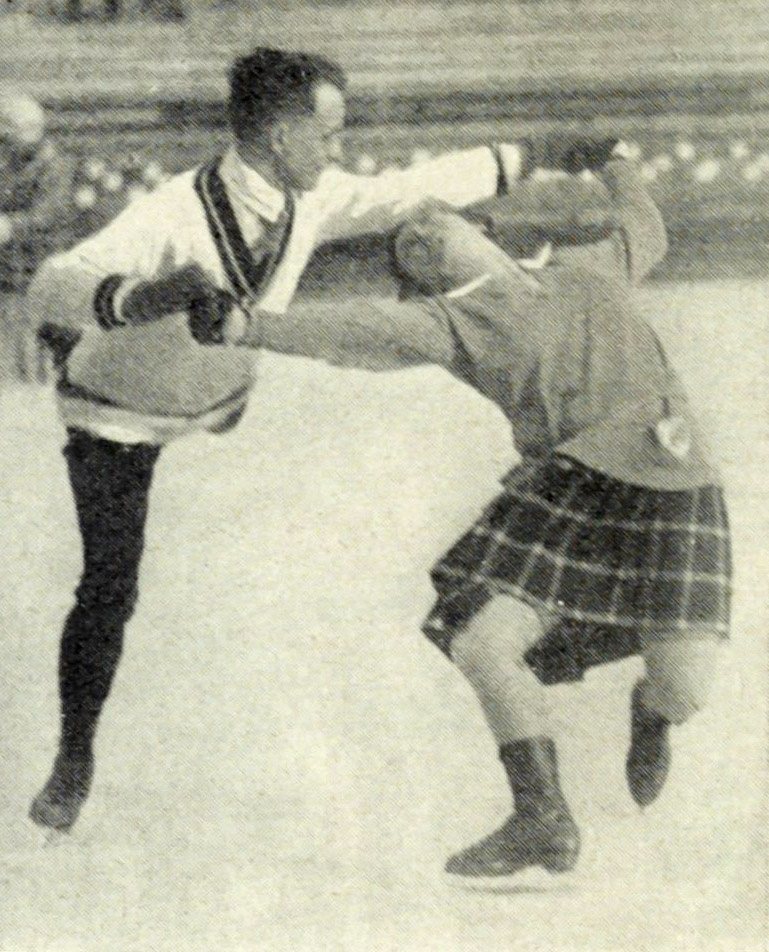
- Born: Emil Paul Ernst Gaste; 13 May 1898; Berlin, German Empire
- Died: 13 March 1972 (aged 73); West Berlin, West Germany

Figure skating career
- Country: Germany

Emil Paul Ernst Gaste (13 May 1898 – 13 March 1972) was a German figure skater. He competed in the mixed pairs event at the 1928 Winter Olympics.
