= Robert Verdun (figure skater) =

Belgian figure skater

Personal information
- Nationality: Belgian
- Born: 2 May 1911; Tienen, Belgium

Sport
- Sport: Figure skating

Robert Verdun (born 2 May 1911, date of death unknown) was a Belgian figure skater. He competed in the pairs event at the 1936 Winter Olympics.
