= Vaulx, Tournai =

Coordinates: 50.5903°N 3.4256°E

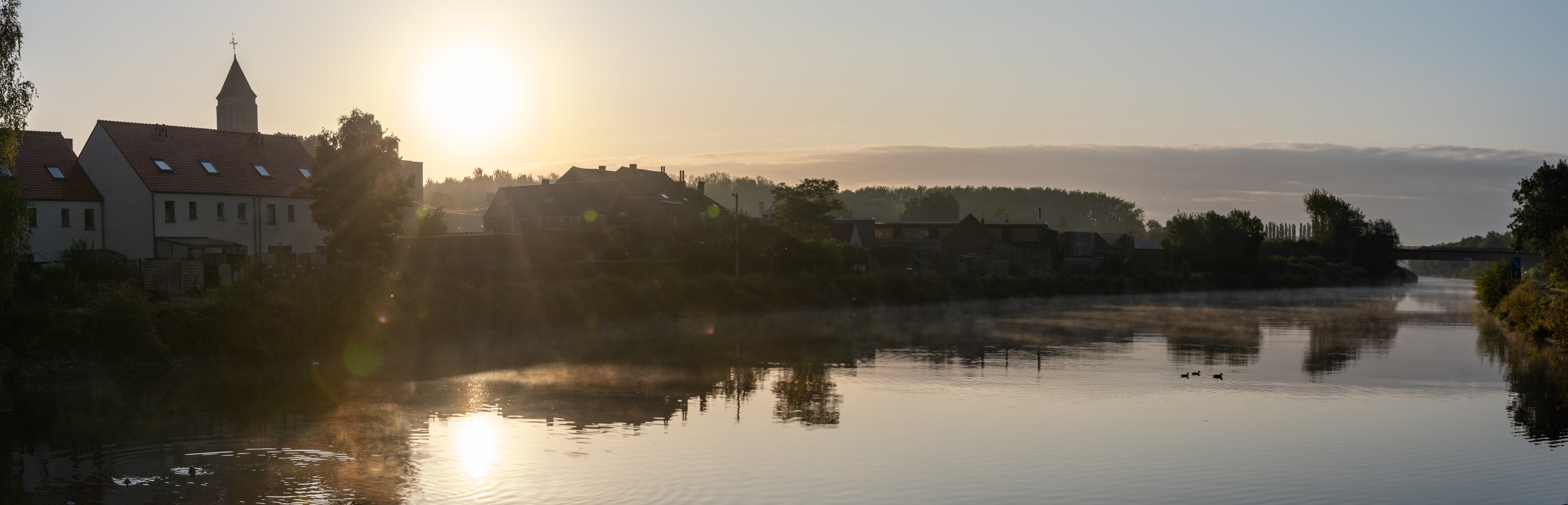
View of the village of Vaulx, Tournai, Belgium from the Scheldt Canal

Vaulx (Picard: Vau) is a village of Wallonia and a district of the municipality of Tournai, located in the province of Hainaut, Belgium.
