= Louise Contamine =

Belgian figure skater

Personal information
- Nationality: Belgian
- Born: 27 January 1905; Antwerp, Belgium
- Died: 1988 (aged 82–83)

Sport
- Sport: Figure skating

Louise Contamine (27 January 1905 – 1988) was a Belgian figure skater. She competed in the pairs event at the 1936 Winter Olympics.
