= Robert Van Zeebroeck =

Belgian figure skater

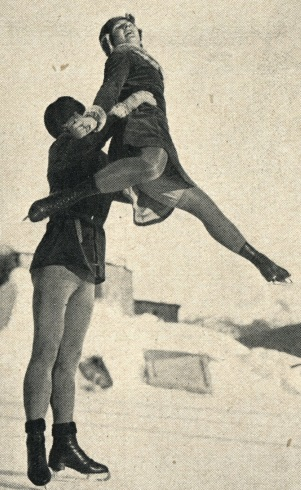

Personal information
- Born: 31 October 1909
- Died: 1991 (aged 81–82)

Figure skating career
- Country: Belgium
Medal record
Men's figure skating
Representing Belgium
Olympic Games
Bronze medal – third place	1928 St. Moritz	Men's singles

Robert Van Zeebroeck (31 October 1909 – 1991) was a Belgian figure skater. He won the bronze medal in the singles event at the 1928 Winter Olympics, became one of the youngest male figure skating Olympic medalists. He also participated with his partner Josy Van Leberghe in the pairs competition where they finished sixth.

== Results ==
=== Men's singles ===
Event	1926	1928	1936	1938
Winter Olympics		3rd		
World Championships	7th			9th
European Championships	6th		10th	

=== Pairs ===
(with Josy Van Leberghe)

Event	1928
Winter Olympics	6th
