= Josy Van Leberghe =

Belgian figure skater

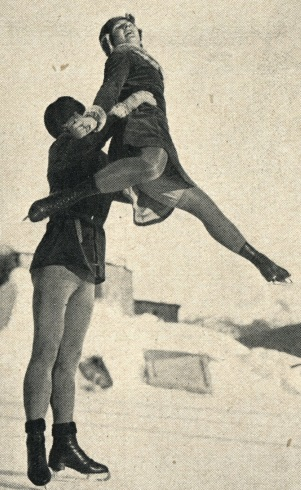
- Born: Unknown
- Died: Unknown

Figure skating career
- Country: Belgium

Josy Van Leberghe was a Belgian figure skater. She competed with Robert Van Zeebroeck in the mixed pairs event at the 1928 Winter Olympics where they finished in sixth place.
