= Kirsten Verbist =

Belgian figure skater (born 1987)

Kirsten Verbist (born 11 March 1987, in Malle, Antwerp) is a Belgian figure skater. She is the 2006 Belgian national champion, and finished second in the 2007 Belgian Figure Skating Championships. She lives in Zoersel, Antwerp.
