= 2021–22 ISU World Standings and Season's World Ranking =

Merit-based ice skating ranking

Season-end No. 1 skaters
- Men's singles: (United States) Nathan Chen
- Women's singles: (Russia) Anna Shcherbakova
- Pairs: (Russia) Anastasia Mishina / Aleksandr Galliamov
- Ice Dance: (United States) Madison Chock / Evan Bates

Season's No. 1 skaters
- Men's singles: (United States) Vincent Zhou
- Women's singles: (Russia) Anna Shcherbakova
- Pairs: (Russia) Evgenia Tarasova / Vladimir Morozov
- Ice Dance: (France) Gabriella Papadakis / Guillaume Cizeron

Season-end No. 1 teams
- Senior Synchronized: (Finland) Team Helsinki Rockettes
- Junior Synchronized: (Finland) Team Fintastic Junior

Season's No. 1 teams
- Senior Synchronized: (Finland) Team Helsinki Rockettes
- Junior Synchronized: (United States) Teams Elite Junior

Navigation

The 2021–22 ISU World Standings and Season's World Ranking are the World Standings and Season's World Ranking published by the International Skating Union (ISU) during the 2021–22 season.

The single & pair skating and ice dance rankings take into account results of the 2019–20, 2020–21, and 2021–22 seasons.

The 2021–22 ISU season's world ranking is based on the results of the 2021–22 season only.

The 2021–22 ISU world standings for synchronized skating are based on the results of the 2019–20, 2020–21, and 2021–22 seasons.

== World Standings and Season's World Ranking for single & pair skating and ice dance ==
=== Season-end World Standings ===
==== Men ====
As of May 17, 2022.

Rank	Nation	Skater	Points	Season	ISU Championships or Olympics	(Junior) Grand Prix and Final		Selected International Competition	
Rank	Nation	Skater	Points	Season	Best	Best	2nd Best	Best	2nd Best
1	USA	Nathan Chen	3964	2021/2022 (100%)	1200	400	324		
1	USA	Nathan Chen	3964	2020/2021 (100%)	1200				
1	USA	Nathan Chen	3964	2019/2020 (70%)		560	280		
2	JPN	Yuma Kagiyama	3564	2021/2022 (100%)	1080	400	400	250	
2	JPN	Yuma Kagiyama	3564	2020/2021 (100%)	1080				
2	JPN	Yuma Kagiyama	3564	2019/2020 (70%)	(476)	179	175		
3	JPN	Shoma Uno	3558	2021/2022 (100%)	1200	400	360		
3	JPN	Shoma Uno	3558	2020/2021 (100%)	875				
3	JPN	Shoma Uno	3558	2019/2020 (70%)		204	134	210	175
4	GEO	Morisi Kvitelashvili	3091	2021/2022 (100%)	875	400	236	243	144
4	GEO	Morisi Kvitelashvili	3091	2020/2021 (100%)	(305)				
4	GEO	Morisi Kvitelashvili	3091	2019/2020 (70%)	476	204	149	189	175
5	ITA	Daniel Grassl	3031	2021/2022 (100%)	756	324	213	300	270
5	ITA	Daniel Grassl	3031	2020/2021 (100%)	(377)				
5	ITA	Daniel Grassl	3031	2019/2020 (70%)	428	175	145	210	210
6	USA	Jason Brown	2976	2021/2022 (100%)	709	360	324	300	
6	USA	Jason Brown	2976	2020/2021 (100%)	638				
6	USA	Jason Brown	2976	2019/2020 (70%)	(529)	252	183	210	
7	JPN	Yuzuru Hanyu	2841	2021/2022 (100%)	875				
7	JPN	Yuzuru Hanyu	2841	2020/2021 (100%)	972				
7	JPN	Yuzuru Hanyu	2841	2019/2020 (70%)	(588)	504	280	210	
8	CAN	Keegan Messing	2722	2021/2022 (100%)	418	262	236	300	219
8	CAN	Keegan Messing	2722	2020/2021 (100%)	709				
8	CAN	Keegan Messing	2722	2019/2020 (70%)	(281)	204	204	170	
9	ITA	Matteo Rizzo	2586	2021/2022 (100%)	465	262	262	250	178
9	ITA	Matteo Rizzo	2586	2020/2021 (100%)	418				
9	ITA	Matteo Rizzo	2586	2019/2020 (70%)	(386)	227	165	189	170
10	LAT	Deniss Vasiljevs	2530	2021/2022 (100%)	680	292	292	219	182
10	LAT	Deniss Vasiljevs	2530	2020/2021 (100%)	(200)				
10	LAT	Deniss Vasiljevs	2530	2019/2020 (70%)	347	183	165	170	
11	USA	Vincent Zhou	2452	2021/2022 (100%)	972	400	360	300	250
11	USA	Vincent Zhou	2452	2020/2021 (100%)					
11	USA	Vincent Zhou	2452	2019/2020 (70%)				170	
12	KOR	Junhwan Cha	2343	2021/2022 (100%)	840	324	262		
12	KOR	Junhwan Cha	2343	2020/2021 (100%)	465				
12	KOR	Junhwan Cha	2343	2019/2020 (70%)	(386)	165	134	153	
13	JPN	Kazuki Tomono	2307	2021/2022 (100%)	756	324	236	250	
13	JPN	Kazuki Tomono	2307	2020/2021 (100%)					
13	JPN	Kazuki Tomono	2307	2019/2020 (70%)	312	183	134	112	
14	RUS	Dmitri Aliev	2299	2021/2022 (100%)		262		243	225
14	RUS	Dmitri Aliev	2299	2020/2021 (100%)					
14	RUS	Dmitri Aliev	2299	2019/2020 (70%)	588	330	252	210	189
15	RUS	Andrei Mozalev	2294	2021/2022 (100%)	612	213		270	243
15	RUS	Andrei Mozalev	2294	2020/2021 (100%)					
15	RUS	Andrei Mozalev	2294	2019/2020 (70%)	350	221	175	210	
16	CHN	Boyang Jin	2219	2021/2022 (100%)	517	213		203	
16	CHN	Boyang Jin	2219	2020/2021 (100%)	(131)				
16	CHN	Boyang Jin	2219	2019/2020 (70%)	428	368	280	210	
17	RUS	Evgeni Semenenko	2064	2021/2022 (100%)	574	324	236	198	
17	RUS	Evgeni Semenenko	2064	2020/2021 (100%)	574				
17	RUS	Evgeni Semenenko	2064	2019/2020 (70%)				158	
18	FRA	Kevin Aymoz	2018	2021/2022 (100%)	446			160	
18	FRA	Kevin Aymoz	2018	2020/2021 (100%)	517				
18	FRA	Kevin Aymoz	2018	2019/2020 (70%)		454	252	189	
19	FRA	Adam Siao Him Fa	1991	2021/2022 (100%)	574	191		270	270
19	FRA	Adam Siao Him Fa	1991	2020/2021 (100%)					
19	FRA	Adam Siao Him Fa	1991	2019/2020 (70%)	205	115	84	170	112
20	USA	Camden Pulkinen	1989	2021/2022 (100%)	787	213		182	
20	USA	Camden Pulkinen	1989	2020/2021 (100%)					
20	USA	Camden Pulkinen	1989	2019/2020 (70%)	205	204	134	139	125
21	RUS	Mark Kondratiuk	1877	2021/2022 (100%)	840	191		270	243
21	RUS	Mark Kondratiuk	1877	2020/2021 (100%)					
21	RUS	Mark Kondratiuk	1877	2019/2020 (70%)				175	158
22	RUS	Alexander Samarin	1874	2021/2022 (100%)		236	191	203	
22	RUS	Alexander Samarin	1874	2020/2021 (100%)					
22	RUS	Alexander Samarin	1874	2019/2020 (70%)	228	408	280	175	153
23	USA	Ilia Malinin	1802	2021/2022 (100%)	517	250	250	250	243
23	USA	Ilia Malinin	1802	2020/2021 (100%)					
23	USA	Ilia Malinin	1802	2019/2020 (70%)	72	127	93		
24	RUS	Mikhail Kolyada	1777	2021/2022 (100%)		360	360	270	
24	RUS	Mikhail Kolyada	1777	2020/2021 (100%)	787				
24	RUS	Mikhail Kolyada	1777	2019/2020 (70%)					
25	JPN	Shun Sato	1679	2021/2022 (100%)		360	292	225	
25	JPN	Shun Sato	1679	2020/2021 (100%)					
25	JPN	Shun Sato	1679	2019/2020 (70%)	207	245	175	175	
26	RUS	Petr Gumennik	1543	2021/2022 (100%)		191		300	243
26	RUS	Petr Gumennik	1543	2020/2021 (100%)					
26	RUS	Petr Gumennik	1543	2019/2020 (70%)	284	175	161	189	
27	EST	Mihhail Selevko	1493	2021/2022 (100%)	295	148	148	225	219
27	EST	Mihhail Selevko	1493	2020/2021 (100%)					
27	EST	Mihhail Selevko	1493	2019/2020 (70%)		76	68	175	139
28	AUS	Brendan Kerry	1485	2021/2022 (100%)	496			178	160
28	AUS	Brendan Kerry	1485	2020/2021 (100%)					
28	AUS	Brendan Kerry	1485	2019/2020 (70%)	185	149		175	142
29	JPN	Sota Yamamoto	1472	2021/2022 (100%)		213	213	300	203
29	JPN	Sota Yamamoto	1472	2020/2021 (100%)					
29	JPN	Sota Yamamoto	1472	2019/2020 (70%)		165		189	189
30	EST	Aleksandr Selevko	1383	2021/2022 (100%)				250	225
30	EST	Aleksandr Selevko	1383	2020/2021 (100%)	247				
30	EST	Aleksandr Selevko	1383	2019/2020 (70%)	151	115	84	158	153
31	AZE	Vladimir Litvintsev	1369	2021/2022 (100%)	402			219	178
31	AZE	Vladimir Litvintsev	1369	2020/2021 (100%)					
31	AZE	Vladimir Litvintsev	1369	2019/2020 (70%)	253			175	142
32	ITA	Gabriele Frangipani	1350	2021/2022 (100%)	362			250	250
32	ITA	Gabriele Frangipani	1350	2020/2021 (100%)					
32	ITA	Gabriele Frangipani	1350	2019/2020 (70%)	166	93	76	153	
33	RUS	Makar Ignatov	1340	2021/2022 (100%)		292	292		
33	RUS	Makar Ignatov	1340	2020/2021 (100%)					
33	RUS	Makar Ignatov	1340	2019/2020 (70%)		227	149	210	170
34	USA	Jimmy Ma	1333	2021/2022 (100%)	325	262		243	225
34	USA	Jimmy Ma	1333	2020/2021 (100%)					
34	USA	Jimmy Ma	1333	2019/2020 (70%)				153	125
35	CAN	Roman Sadovsky	1331	2021/2022 (100%)	377	292		144	
35	CAN	Roman Sadovsky	1331	2020/2021 (100%)					
35	CAN	Roman Sadovsky	1331	2019/2020 (70%)	121	227		170	
36	SUI	Lukas Britschgi	1251	2021/2022 (100%)	293			250	164
36	SUI	Lukas Britschgi	1251	2020/2021 (100%)	275				
36	SUI	Lukas Britschgi	1251	2019/2020 (70%)	(88)			142	127
37	KOR	Sihyeong Lee	1195	2021/2022 (100%)	446			198	
37	KOR	Sihyeong Lee	1195	2020/2021 (100%)					
37	KOR	Sihyeong Lee	1195	2019/2020 (70%)	150	158	104	139	
38	UKR	Ivan Shmuratko	1183	2021/2022 (100%)	264			198	182
38	UKR	Ivan Shmuratko	1183	2020/2021 (100%)	146				
38	UKR	Ivan Shmuratko	1183	2019/2020 (70%)	(80)	142	93	158	
39	USA	Tomoki Hiwatashi	1175	2021/2022 (100%)	402			198	
39	USA	Tomoki Hiwatashi	1175	2020/2021 (100%)					
39	USA	Tomoki Hiwatashi	1175	2019/2020 (70%)	253	183		139	
40	CAN	Nam Nguyen	1126	2021/2022 (100%)		191			
40	CAN	Nam Nguyen	1126	2020/2021 (100%)					
40	CAN	Nam Nguyen	1126	2019/2020 (70%)	347	252	183	153	
41	CZE	Michal Brezina	1123	2021/2022 (100%)	325	236		250	
41	CZE	Michal Brezina	1123	2020/2021 (100%)	(180)				
41	CZE	Michal Brezina	1123	2019/2020 (70%)	312				
42	EST	Arlet Levandi	1092	2021/2022 (100%)	214	225	225	250	178
42	EST	Arlet Levandi	1092	2020/2021 (100%)					
42	EST	Arlet Levandi	1092	2019/2020 (70%)					
43	JPN	Sena Miyake	1065	2021/2022 (100%)	612			225	160
43	JPN	Sena Miyake	1065	2020/2021 (100%)					
43	JPN	Sena Miyake	1065	2019/2020 (70%)		68			
44	AUT	Maurizio Zandron	1055	2021/2022 (100%)	222			250	250
44	AUT	Maurizio Zandron	1055	2020/2021 (100%)					
44	AUT	Maurizio Zandron	1055	2019/2020 (70%)				175	158
45	CAN	Wesley Chiu	1037	2021/2022 (100%)	365	250	203	219	
45	CAN	Wesley Chiu	1037	2020/2021 (100%)					
45	CAN	Wesley Chiu	1037	2019/2020 (70%)					
46	RUS	Artur Danielian	998	2021/2022 (100%)					
46	RUS	Artur Danielian	998	2020/2021 (100%)					
46	RUS	Artur Danielian	998	2019/2020 (70%)	529	158	158	153	
47	RUS	Artem Kovalev	996	2021/2022 (100%)		225	182	225	
47	RUS	Artem Kovalev	996	2020/2021 (100%)					
47	RUS	Artem Kovalev	996	2019/2020 (70%)				189	175
48	JPN	Kao Miura	964	2021/2022 (100%)	680	191			
48	JPN	Kao Miura	964	2020/2021 (100%)					
48	JPN	Kao Miura	964	2019/2020 (70%)		93			
49	ISR	Alexei Bychenko	941	2021/2022 (100%)				178	
49	ISR	Alexei Bychenko	941	2020/2021 (100%)	106				
49	ISR	Alexei Bychenko	941	2019/2020 (70%)	185	149		170	153
50	RUS	Gleb Lutfullin	896	2021/2022 (100%)		250	250		
50	RUS	Gleb Lutfullin	896	2020/2021 (100%)					
50	RUS	Gleb Lutfullin	896	2019/2020 (70%)		142	127	127	
51	ITA	Nikolaj Memola	880	2021/2022 (100%)	266	182		250	182
51	ITA	Nikolaj Memola	880	2020/2021 (100%)					
51	ITA	Nikolaj Memola	880	2019/2020 (70%)					
51	RUS	Ilya Yablokov	880	2021/2022 (100%)		250	225		
51	RUS	Ilya Yablokov	880	2020/2021 (100%)					
51	RUS	Ilya Yablokov	880	2019/2020 (70%)	136	142	127		
53	CAN	Joseph Phan	830	2021/2022 (100%)	362				
53	CAN	Joseph Phan	830	2020/2021 (100%)					
53	CAN	Joseph Phan	830	2019/2020 (70%)	110	115	104	139	
54	CHN	Han Yan	819	2021/2022 (100%)					
54	CHN	Han Yan	819	2020/2021 (100%)	339				
54	CHN	Han Yan	819	2019/2020 (70%)	228	252			
55	AUT	Luc Maierhofer	817	2021/2022 (100%)				225	225
55	AUT	Luc Maierhofer	817	2020/2021 (100%)					
55	AUT	Luc Maierhofer	817	2019/2020 (70%)		84		158	125
56	KAZ	Mikhail Shaidorov	815	2021/2022 (100%)	551	225			
56	KAZ	Mikhail Shaidorov	815	2020/2021 (100%)					
56	KAZ	Mikhail Shaidorov	815	2019/2020 (70%)	39				
57	SWE	Nikolaj Majorov	798	2021/2022 (100%)	180			225	
57	SWE	Nikolaj Majorov	798	2020/2021 (100%)	(118)				
57	SWE	Nikolaj Majorov	798	2019/2020 (70%)	134			158	101
58	JPN	Keiji Tanaka	778	2021/2022 (100%)					
58	JPN	Keiji Tanaka	778	2020/2021 (100%)					
58	JPN	Keiji Tanaka	778	2019/2020 (70%)		227	183	210	158
59	GBR	Graham Newberry	773	2021/2022 (100%)	162			164	164
59	GBR	Graham Newberry	773	2020/2021 (100%)					
59	GBR	Graham Newberry	773	2019/2020 (70%)				158	125
60	GEO	Irakli Maysuradze	733	2021/2022 (100%)				250	
60	GEO	Irakli Maysuradze	733	2020/2021 (100%)					
60	GEO	Irakli Maysuradze	733	2019/2020 (70%)	150			175	158
61	ISR	Mark Gorodnitsky	726	2021/2022 (100%)				182	
61	ISR	Mark Gorodnitsky	726	2020/2021 (100%)					
61	ISR	Mark Gorodnitsky	726	2019/2020 (70%)	109	115	93	115	112
62	CAN	Corey Circelli	725	2021/2022 (100%)	293	182	182		
62	CAN	Corey Circelli	725	2020/2021 (100%)					
62	CAN	Corey Circelli	725	2019/2020 (70%)		68			
63	KAZ	Dias Jirenbayev	712	2021/2022 (100%)	237	108		203	164
63	KAZ	Dias Jirenbayev	712	2020/2021 (100%)					
63	KAZ	Dias Jirenbayev	712	2019/2020 (70%)					
64	FRA	Luc Economides	675	2021/2022 (100%)				250	250
64	FRA	Luc Economides	675	2020/2021 (100%)					
64	FRA	Luc Economides	675	2019/2020 (70%)				175	
65	CAN	Stephen Gogolev	666	2021/2022 (100%)	328				
65	CAN	Stephen Gogolev	666	2020/2021 (100%)					
65	CAN	Stephen Gogolev	666	2019/2020 (70%)	65	158	115		
66	FIN	Valtter Virtanen	660	2021/2022 (100%)	126			225	182
66	FIN	Valtter Virtanen	660	2020/2021 (100%)					
66	FIN	Valtter Virtanen	660	2019/2020 (70%)				127	
67	MON	Davide Lewton Brain	656	2021/2022 (100%)	113			225	203
67	MON	Davide Lewton Brain	656	2020/2021 (100%)					
67	MON	Davide Lewton Brain	656	2019/2020 (70%)				115	
68	JPN	Tatsuya Tsuboi	630	2021/2022 (100%)	405			225	
68	JPN	Tatsuya Tsuboi	630	2020/2021 (100%)					
68	JPN	Tatsuya Tsuboi	630	2019/2020 (70%)					
69	ARM	Slavik Hayrapetyan	629	2021/2022 (100%)	74			203	
69	ARM	Slavik Hayrapetyan	629	2020/2021 (100%)					
69	ARM	Slavik Hayrapetyan	629	2019/2020 (70%)	98			127	127
70	GBR	Edward Appleby	626	2021/2022 (100%)	68	203	97	182	
70	GBR	Edward Appleby	626	2020/2021 (100%)					
70	GBR	Edward Appleby	626	2019/2020 (70%)		76			
71	KOR	Younghyun Cha	617	2021/2022 (100%)	75	182	133		
71	KOR	Younghyun Cha	617	2020/2021 (100%)					
71	KOR	Younghyun Cha	617	2019/2020 (70%)		115		112	
71	TUR	Burak Demirboga	617	2021/2022 (100%)	83			182	
71	TUR	Burak Demirboga	617	2020/2021 (100%)					
71	TUR	Burak Demirboga	617	2019/2020 (70%)	52			158	142
73	USA	Andrew Torgashev	610	2021/2022 (100%)					
73	USA	Andrew Torgashev	610	2020/2021 (100%)					
73	USA	Andrew Torgashev	610	2019/2020 (70%)	167	127	127	189	
74	GER	Nikita Starostin	584	2021/2022 (100%)	237			203	144
74	GER	Nikita Starostin	584	2020/2021 (100%)					
74	GER	Nikita Starostin	584	2019/2020 (70%)					
75	GEO	Nika Egadze	577	2021/2022 (100%)				300	219
75	GEO	Nika Egadze	577	2020/2021 (100%)					
75	GEO	Nika Egadze	577	2019/2020 (70%)	58				
76	ESP	Tomas-Llorenc Guarino Sabate	560	2021/2022 (100%)	146			250	164
76	ESP	Tomas-Llorenc Guarino Sabate	560	2020/2021 (100%)					
76	ESP	Tomas-Llorenc Guarino Sabate	560	2019/2020 (70%)					
77	RUS	Egor Rukhin	555	2021/2022 (100%)		225	203		
77	RUS	Egor Rukhin	555	2020/2021 (100%)					
77	RUS	Egor Rukhin	555	2019/2020 (70%)		127			
78	USA	Maxim Naumov	526	2021/2022 (100%)				203	
78	USA	Maxim Naumov	526	2020/2021 (100%)					
78	USA	Maxim Naumov	526	2019/2020 (70%)	230	93			
79	BUL	Larry Loupolover	524	2021/2022 (100%)				164	
79	BUL	Larry Loupolover	524	2020/2021 (100%)					
79	BUL	Larry Loupolover	524	2019/2020 (70%)	58			175	127
80	SUI	Naoki Rossi	517	2021/2022 (100%)	215	182	120		
80	SUI	Naoki Rossi	517	2020/2021 (100%)					
80	SUI	Naoki Rossi	517	2019/2020 (70%)					
81	BLR	Konstantin Milyukov	511	2021/2022 (100%)	162				
81	BLR	Konstantin Milyukov	511	2020/2021 (100%)	222				
81	BLR	Konstantin Milyukov	511	2019/2020 (70%)				127	
82	CZE	Georgii Reshtenko	482	2021/2022 (100%)	174	164		144	
82	CZE	Georgii Reshtenko	482	2020/2021 (100%)					
82	CZE	Georgii Reshtenko	482	2019/2020 (70%)					
83	BLR	Alexander Lebedev	475	2021/2022 (100%)		97			
83	BLR	Alexander Lebedev	475	2020/2021 (100%)					
83	BLR	Alexander Lebedev	475	2019/2020 (70%)	64	84		115	115
84	SVK	Adam Hagara	467	2021/2022 (100%)	61			203	203
84	SVK	Adam Hagara	467	2020/2021 (100%)					
84	SVK	Adam Hagara	467	2019/2020 (70%)					
85	SWE	Andreas Nordebäck	466	2021/2022 (100%)	194	164	108		
85	SWE	Andreas Nordebäck	466	2020/2021 (100%)					
85	SWE	Andreas Nordebäck	466	2019/2020 (70%)					
86	SUI	Nurullah Sahaka	461	2021/2022 (100%)				182	164
86	SUI	Nurullah Sahaka	461	2020/2021 (100%)					
86	SUI	Nurullah Sahaka	461	2019/2020 (70%)				115	
87	MEX	Donovan Carrillo	460	2021/2022 (100%)	(131)			164	
87	MEX	Donovan Carrillo	460	2020/2021 (100%)	162				
87	MEX	Donovan Carrillo	460	2019/2020 (70%)	134				
88	GER	Paul Fentz	454	2021/2022 (100%)	173				
88	GER	Paul Fentz	454	2020/2021 (100%)					
88	GER	Paul Fentz	454	2019/2020 (70%)	281				
89	RUS	Kirill Sarnovskiy	453	2021/2022 (100%)		250	203		
89	RUS	Kirill Sarnovskiy	453	2020/2021 (100%)					
89	RUS	Kirill Sarnovskiy	453	2019/2020 (70%)					
90	FRA	Romain Ponsart	450	2021/2022 (100%)				225	225
90	FRA	Romain Ponsart	450	2020/2021 (100%)					
90	FRA	Romain Ponsart	450	2019/2020 (70%)					
91	USA	Liam Kapeikis	442	2021/2022 (100%)	239			203	
91	USA	Liam Kapeikis	442	2020/2021 (100%)					
91	USA	Liam Kapeikis	442	2019/2020 (70%)					
92	FRA	Landry Le May	428	2021/2022 (100%)				225	203
92	FRA	Landry Le May	428	2020/2021 (100%)					
92	FRA	Landry Le May	428	2019/2020 (70%)					
93	JPN	Lucas Tsuyoshi Honda	397	2021/2022 (100%)	127			270	
93	JPN	Lucas Tsuyoshi Honda	397	2020/2021 (100%)					
93	JPN	Lucas Tsuyoshi Honda	397	2019/2020 (70%)					
94	LAT	Daniels Kockers	392	2021/2022 (100%)		120	108	164	
94	LAT	Daniels Kockers	392	2020/2021 (100%)					
94	LAT	Daniels Kockers	392	2019/2020 (70%)					
95	USA	Ryan Dunk	389	2021/2022 (100%)					
95	USA	Ryan Dunk	389	2020/2021 (100%)					
95	USA	Ryan Dunk	389	2019/2020 (70%)		115	104	170	
96	JPN	Koshiro Shimada	387	2021/2022 (100%)				198	
96	JPN	Koshiro Shimada	387	2020/2021 (100%)					
96	JPN	Koshiro Shimada	387	2019/2020 (70%)				189	
97	AUS	James Min	381	2021/2022 (100%)	192				
97	AUS	James Min	381	2020/2021 (100%)					
97	AUS	James Min	381	2019/2020 (70%)	88			101	
98	RUS	Daniil Samsonov	374	2021/2022 (100%)					
98	RUS	Daniil Samsonov	374	2020/2021 (100%)					
98	RUS	Daniil Samsonov	374	2019/2020 (70%)		199	175		
99	CRO	Jari Kessler	367	2021/2022 (100%)				203	164
99	CRO	Jari Kessler	367	2020/2021 (100%)					
99	CRO	Jari Kessler	367	2019/2020 (70%)					
99	USA	William Annis	367	2021/2022 (100%)		203	164		
99	USA	William Annis	367	2020/2021 (100%)					
99	USA	William Annis	367	2019/2020 (70%)					
101	ITA	Emanuele Indelicato	364	2021/2022 (100%)				182	182
101	ITA	Emanuele Indelicato	364	2020/2021 (100%)					
101	ITA	Emanuele Indelicato	364	2019/2020 (70%)					
102	FRA	Francois Pitot	351	2021/2022 (100%)		203	148		
102	FRA	Francois Pitot	351	2020/2021 (100%)					
102	FRA	Francois Pitot	351	2019/2020 (70%)					
103	CZE	Matyas Belohradsky	347	2021/2022 (100%)				164	
103	CZE	Matyas Belohradsky	347	2020/2021 (100%)					
103	CZE	Matyas Belohradsky	347	2019/2020 (70%)	79	104			
103	TUR	Basar Oktar	347	2021/2022 (100%)					
103	TUR	Basar Oktar	347	2020/2021 (100%)					
103	TUR	Basar Oktar	347	2019/2020 (70%)	53	68	68	158	
105	USA	Lucas Broussard	345	2021/2022 (100%)		225	120		
105	USA	Lucas Broussard	345	2020/2021 (100%)					
105	USA	Lucas Broussard	345	2019/2020 (70%)					
106	GER	Kai Jagoda	318	2021/2022 (100%)				203	
106	GER	Kai Jagoda	318	2020/2021 (100%)					
106	GER	Kai Jagoda	318	2019/2020 (70%)				115	
107	PHI	Christopher Caluza	311	2021/2022 (100%)					
107	PHI	Christopher Caluza	311	2020/2021 (100%)					
107	PHI	Christopher Caluza	311	2019/2020 (70%)	98			112	101
108	USA	Matthew Nielsen	307	2021/2022 (100%)		203			
108	USA	Matthew Nielsen	307	2020/2021 (100%)					
108	USA	Matthew Nielsen	307	2019/2020 (70%)		104			
109	GBR	Peter James Hallam	304	2021/2022 (100%)				203	
109	GBR	Peter James Hallam	304	2020/2021 (100%)					
109	GBR	Peter James Hallam	304	2019/2020 (70%)				101	
110	ISR	Daniel Samohin	303	2021/2022 (100%)				164	
110	ISR	Daniel Samohin	303	2020/2021 (100%)					
110	ISR	Daniel Samohin	303	2019/2020 (70%)				139	
111	CAN	Nicolas Nadeau	298	2021/2022 (100%)					
111	CAN	Nicolas Nadeau	298	2020/2021 (100%)					
111	CAN	Nicolas Nadeau	298	2019/2020 (70%)		149	149		
111	KOR	Jaeseok Kyeong	298	2021/2022 (100%)	214				
111	KOR	Jaeseok Kyeong	298	2020/2021 (100%)					
111	KOR	Jaeseok Kyeong	298	2019/2020 (70%)		84			
113	SVK	Michael Neuman	297	2021/2022 (100%)				182	
113	SVK	Michael Neuman	297	2020/2021 (100%)					
113	SVK	Michael Neuman	297	2019/2020 (70%)				115	
114	GER	Denis Gurdzhi	296	2021/2022 (100%)				164	
114	GER	Denis Gurdzhi	296	2020/2021 (100%)					
114	GER	Denis Gurdzhi	296	2019/2020 (70%)	48	84			
115	RUS	Andrei Anisimov	281	2021/2022 (100%)		148	133		
115	RUS	Andrei Anisimov	281	2020/2021 (100%)					
115	RUS	Andrei Anisimov	281	2019/2020 (70%)					
116	KAZ	Rakhat Bralin	279	2021/2022 (100%)				164	
116	KAZ	Rakhat Bralin	279	2020/2021 (100%)					
116	KAZ	Rakhat Bralin	279	2019/2020 (70%)				115	
117	FRA	Adrien Tesson	254	2021/2022 (100%)					
117	FRA	Adrien Tesson	254	2020/2021 (100%)					
117	FRA	Adrien Tesson	254	2019/2020 (70%)				142	112
118	POL	Vladimir Samoilov	250	2021/2022 (100%)				250	
118	POL	Vladimir Samoilov	250	2020/2021 (100%)					
118	POL	Vladimir Samoilov	250	2019/2020 (70%)					
119	USA	Kai Kovar	247	2021/2022 (100%)	83	164			
119	USA	Kai Kovar	247	2020/2021 (100%)					
119	USA	Kai Kovar	247	2019/2020 (70%)					
120	RUS	Andrei Lazukin	246	2021/2022 (100%)					
120	RUS	Andrei Lazukin	246	2020/2021 (100%)					
120	RUS	Andrei Lazukin	246	2019/2020 (70%)		134		112	
121	FIN	Roman Galay	237	2021/2022 (100%)					
121	FIN	Roman Galay	237	2020/2021 (100%)					
121	FIN	Roman Galay	237	2019/2020 (70%)				125	112
122	ISR	Lev Vinokur	236	2021/2022 (100%)	103	133			
122	ISR	Lev Vinokur	236	2020/2021 (100%)					
122	ISR	Lev Vinokur	236	2019/2020 (70%)					
123	UKR	Vadym Novikov	230	2021/2022 (100%)		133	97		
123	UKR	Vadym Novikov	230	2020/2021 (100%)					
123	UKR	Vadym Novikov	230	2019/2020 (70%)					
124	KOR	Hyungyeom Kim	228	2021/2022 (100%)		120	108		
124	KOR	Hyungyeom Kim	228	2020/2021 (100%)					
124	KOR	Hyungyeom Kim	228	2019/2020 (70%)					
125	AUS	Jordan Dodds	225	2021/2022 (100%)	173				
125	AUS	Jordan Dodds	225	2020/2021 (100%)					
125	AUS	Jordan Dodds	225	2019/2020 (70%)	52				
125	ITA	Alessandro Fadini	225	2021/2022 (100%)				225	
125	ITA	Alessandro Fadini	225	2020/2021 (100%)					
125	ITA	Alessandro Fadini	225	2019/2020 (70%)					
127	CAN	Alec Guinzbourg	224	2021/2022 (100%)		97			
127	CAN	Alec Guinzbourg	224	2020/2021 (100%)					
127	CAN	Alec Guinzbourg	224	2019/2020 (70%)		127			
128	FRA	Corentin Spinar	213	2021/2022 (100%)	93	120			
128	FRA	Corentin Spinar	213	2020/2021 (100%)					
128	FRA	Corentin Spinar	213	2019/2020 (70%)					
129	ESP	Pablo Garcia	203	2021/2022 (100%)				203	
129	ESP	Pablo Garcia	203	2020/2021 (100%)					
129	ESP	Pablo Garcia	203	2019/2020 (70%)					
129	SWE	Gabriel Folkesson	203	2021/2022 (100%)				203	
129	SWE	Gabriel Folkesson	203	2020/2021 (100%)					
129	SWE	Gabriel Folkesson	203	2019/2020 (70%)					
129	USA	Eric Sjoberg	203	2021/2022 (100%)				203	
129	USA	Eric Sjoberg	203	2020/2021 (100%)					
129	USA	Eric Sjoberg	203	2019/2020 (70%)					
132	THA	Micah Kai Lynette	183	2021/2022 (100%)					
132	THA	Micah Kai Lynette	183	2020/2021 (100%)					
132	THA	Micah Kai Lynette	183	2019/2020 (70%)	71			112	
133	FRA	Sami Hammi	182	2021/2022 (100%)				182	
133	FRA	Sami Hammi	182	2020/2021 (100%)					
133	FRA	Sami Hammi	182	2019/2020 (70%)					
133	HUN	Andras Csernoch	182	2021/2022 (100%)				182	
133	HUN	Andras Csernoch	182	2020/2021 (100%)					
133	HUN	Andras Csernoch	182	2019/2020 (70%)					
133	ESP	Iker Oyarzabal Albas	182	2021/2022 (100%)				182	
133	ESP	Iker Oyarzabal Albas	182	2020/2021 (100%)					
133	ESP	Iker Oyarzabal Albas	182	2019/2020 (70%)					
133	SWE	Oliver Praetorius	182	2021/2022 (100%)				182	
133	SWE	Oliver Praetorius	182	2020/2021 (100%)					
133	SWE	Oliver Praetorius	182	2019/2020 (70%)					
133	UKR	Mykhailo Rudkovskyi	182	2021/2022 (100%)				182	
133	UKR	Mykhailo Rudkovskyi	182	2020/2021 (100%)					
133	UKR	Mykhailo Rudkovskyi	182	2019/2020 (70%)					
133	USA	Yaroslav Paniot	182	2021/2022 (100%)				182	
133	USA	Yaroslav Paniot	182	2020/2021 (100%)					
133	USA	Yaroslav Paniot	182	2019/2020 (70%)					
133	USA	Maxim Zharkov	182	2021/2022 (100%)		182			
133	USA	Maxim Zharkov	182	2020/2021 (100%)					
133	USA	Maxim Zharkov	182	2019/2020 (70%)					
140	CHN	Yudong Chen	180	2021/2022 (100%)					
140	CHN	Yudong Chen	180	2020/2021 (100%)					
140	CHN	Yudong Chen	180	2019/2020 (70%)		104	76		
140	PHI	Edrian Paul Celestino	180	2021/2022 (100%)					
140	PHI	Edrian Paul Celestino	180	2020/2021 (100%)					
140	PHI	Edrian Paul Celestino	180	2019/2020 (70%)	79			101	
142	POL	Jakub Lofek	177	2021/2022 (100%)	44	133			
142	POL	Jakub Lofek	177	2020/2021 (100%)					
142	POL	Jakub Lofek	177	2019/2020 (70%)					
143	CAN	Iliya Kovler	172	2021/2022 (100%)					
143	CAN	Iliya Kovler	172	2020/2021 (100%)					
143	CAN	Iliya Kovler	172	2019/2020 (70%)		104	68		
144	CHN	He Zhang	166	2021/2022 (100%)					
144	CHN	He Zhang	166	2020/2021 (100%)					
144	CHN	He Zhang	166	2019/2020 (70%)	166				
145	BUL	Beat Schümperli	164	2021/2022 (100%)				164	
145	BUL	Beat Schümperli	164	2020/2021 (100%)					
145	BUL	Beat Schümperli	164	2019/2020 (70%)					
145	FRA	Joshua Rols	164	2021/2022 (100%)				164	
145	FRA	Joshua Rols	164	2020/2021 (100%)					
145	FRA	Joshua Rols	164	2019/2020 (70%)					
145	FRA	Ian Vauclin	164	2021/2022 (100%)		164			
145	FRA	Ian Vauclin	164	2020/2021 (100%)					
145	FRA	Ian Vauclin	164	2019/2020 (70%)					
145	GBR	Ken Fitterer	164	2021/2022 (100%)				164	
145	GBR	Ken Fitterer	164	2020/2021 (100%)					
145	GBR	Ken Fitterer	164	2019/2020 (70%)					
145	HUN	Mozes Jozsef Berei	164	2021/2022 (100%)				164	
145	HUN	Mozes Jozsef Berei	164	2020/2021 (100%)					
145	HUN	Mozes Jozsef Berei	164	2019/2020 (70%)					
145	KOR	Jaekeun Lee	164	2021/2022 (100%)		164			
145	KOR	Jaekeun Lee	164	2020/2021 (100%)					
145	KOR	Jaekeun Lee	164	2019/2020 (70%)					
145	RUS	Fedor Zonov	164	2021/2022 (100%)		164			
145	RUS	Fedor Zonov	164	2020/2021 (100%)					
145	RUS	Fedor Zonov	164	2019/2020 (70%)					
152	CAN	Aleksa Rakic	158	2021/2022 (100%)					
152	CAN	Aleksa Rakic	158	2020/2021 (100%)					
152	CAN	Aleksa Rakic	158	2019/2020 (70%)		158			
153	FIN	Makar Suntsev	148	2021/2022 (100%)		148			
153	FIN	Makar Suntsev	148	2020/2021 (100%)					
153	FIN	Makar Suntsev	148	2019/2020 (70%)					
153	SWE	Casper Johansson	148	2021/2022 (100%)		148			
153	SWE	Casper Johansson	148	2020/2021 (100%)					
153	SWE	Casper Johansson	148	2019/2020 (70%)					
153	USA	Jacob Sanchez	148	2021/2022 (100%)		148			
153	USA	Jacob Sanchez	148	2020/2021 (100%)					
153	USA	Jacob Sanchez	148	2019/2020 (70%)					
156	GER	Louis Weissert	146	2021/2022 (100%)	49	97			
156	GER	Louis Weissert	146	2020/2021 (100%)					
156	GER	Louis Weissert	146	2019/2020 (70%)					
157	RUS	Alexey Erokhov	144	2021/2022 (100%)				144	
157	RUS	Alexey Erokhov	144	2020/2021 (100%)					
157	RUS	Alexey Erokhov	144	2019/2020 (70%)					
158	FRA	Philip Warren	142	2021/2022 (100%)					
158	FRA	Philip Warren	142	2020/2021 (100%)					
158	FRA	Philip Warren	142	2019/2020 (70%)				142	
158	ITA	Mattia Dalla Torre	142	2021/2022 (100%)					
158	ITA	Mattia Dalla Torre	142	2020/2021 (100%)					
158	ITA	Mattia Dalla Torre	142	2019/2020 (70%)				142	
158	JPN	Yuto Kishina	142	2021/2022 (100%)					
158	JPN	Yuto Kishina	142	2020/2021 (100%)					
158	JPN	Yuto Kishina	142	2019/2020 (70%)				142	
158	RUS	Andrei Kutovoi	142	2021/2022 (100%)					
158	RUS	Andrei Kutovoi	142	2020/2021 (100%)					
158	RUS	Andrei Kutovoi	142	2019/2020 (70%)		142			
162	POL	Kornel Witkowski	140	2021/2022 (100%)	140				
162	POL	Kornel Witkowski	140	2020/2021 (100%)					
162	POL	Kornel Witkowski	140	2019/2020 (70%)					
163	JPN	Mitsuki Sumoto	139	2021/2022 (100%)					
163	JPN	Mitsuki Sumoto	139	2020/2021 (100%)					
163	JPN	Mitsuki Sumoto	139	2019/2020 (70%)				139	
163	RUS	Egor Murashov	139	2021/2022 (100%)					
163	RUS	Egor Murashov	139	2020/2021 (100%)					
163	RUS	Egor Murashov	139	2019/2020 (70%)				139	
165	RUS	Anton Shulepov	134	2021/2022 (100%)					
165	RUS	Anton Shulepov	134	2020/2021 (100%)					
165	RUS	Anton Shulepov	134	2019/2020 (70%)		134			
166	TPE	Yu-Hsiang Li	133	2021/2022 (100%)		133			
166	TPE	Yu-Hsiang Li	133	2020/2021 (100%)					
166	TPE	Yu-Hsiang Li	133	2019/2020 (70%)					
166	TUR	Alp Eren Ozkan	133	2021/2022 (100%)		133			
166	TUR	Alp Eren Ozkan	133	2020/2021 (100%)					
166	TUR	Alp Eren Ozkan	133	2019/2020 (70%)					
168	BUL	Alexander Zlatkov	127	2021/2022 (100%)					
168	BUL	Alexander Zlatkov	127	2020/2021 (100%)					
168	BUL	Alexander Zlatkov	127	2019/2020 (70%)				127	
169	CAN	Conrad Orzel	125	2021/2022 (100%)					
169	CAN	Conrad Orzel	125	2020/2021 (100%)					
169	CAN	Conrad Orzel	125	2019/2020 (70%)				125	
169	MAS	Julian Zhi Jie Yee	125	2021/2022 (100%)					
169	MAS	Julian Zhi Jie Yee	125	2020/2021 (100%)					
169	MAS	Julian Zhi Jie Yee	125	2019/2020 (70%)				125	
169	KOR	Se Jong Byun	125	2021/2022 (100%)					
169	KOR	Se Jong Byun	125	2020/2021 (100%)					
169	KOR	Se Jong Byun	125	2019/2020 (70%)				125	
172	CAN	Matthew Newnham	120	2021/2022 (100%)		120			
172	CAN	Matthew Newnham	120	2020/2021 (100%)					
172	CAN	Matthew Newnham	120	2019/2020 (70%)					
172	SWE	Jonathan Egyptson	120	2021/2022 (100%)		120			
172	SWE	Jonathan Egyptson	120	2020/2021 (100%)					
172	SWE	Jonathan Egyptson	120	2019/2020 (70%)					
174	NED	Thomas Kennes	115	2021/2022 (100%)					
174	NED	Thomas Kennes	115	2020/2021 (100%)					
174	NED	Thomas Kennes	115	2019/2020 (70%)				115	
174	SUI	Nicola Todeschini	115	2021/2022 (100%)					
174	SUI	Nicola Todeschini	115	2020/2021 (100%)					
174	SUI	Nicola Todeschini	115	2019/2020 (70%)				115	
176	ITA	Raffaele Francesco Zich	114	2021/2022 (100%)	114				
176	ITA	Raffaele Francesco Zich	114	2020/2021 (100%)					
176	ITA	Raffaele Francesco Zich	114	2019/2020 (70%)					
177	CZE	Jiri Belohradsky	112	2021/2022 (100%)					
177	CZE	Jiri Belohradsky	112	2020/2021 (100%)					
177	CZE	Jiri Belohradsky	112	2019/2020 (70%)				112	
178	TPE	Fang-Yi Lin	108	2021/2022 (100%)		108			
178	TPE	Fang-Yi Lin	108	2020/2021 (100%)					
178	TPE	Fang-Yi Lin	108	2019/2020 (70%)					
178	ITA	Matteo Nalbone	108	2021/2022 (100%)		108			
178	ITA	Matteo Nalbone	108	2020/2021 (100%)					
178	ITA	Matteo Nalbone	108	2019/2020 (70%)					
178	UKR	Fedir Kulish	108	2021/2022 (100%)		108			
178	UKR	Fedir Kulish	108	2020/2021 (100%)					
178	UKR	Fedir Kulish	108	2019/2020 (70%)					
181	TPE	Micah Tang	101	2021/2022 (100%)					
181	TPE	Micah Tang	101	2020/2021 (100%)					
181	TPE	Micah Tang	101	2019/2020 (70%)				101	
182	ISR	Iakov Pogrebinskii	97	2021/2022 (100%)		97			
182	ISR	Iakov Pogrebinskii	97	2020/2021 (100%)					
182	ISR	Iakov Pogrebinskii	97	2019/2020 (70%)					
182	RUS	Aleksandr Golubev	97	2021/2022 (100%)		97			
182	RUS	Aleksandr Golubev	97	2020/2021 (100%)					
182	RUS	Aleksandr Golubev	97	2019/2020 (70%)					
184	USA	Joseph Klein	93	2021/2022 (100%)					
184	USA	Joseph Klein	93	2020/2021 (100%)					
184	USA	Joseph Klein	93	2019/2020 (70%)		93			
185	CAN	Eric Liu	84	2021/2022 (100%)					
185	CAN	Eric Liu	84	2020/2021 (100%)					
185	CAN	Eric Liu	84	2019/2020 (70%)		84			
186	CAN	Beres Clements	76	2021/2022 (100%)					
186	CAN	Beres Clements	76	2020/2021 (100%)					
186	CAN	Beres Clements	76	2019/2020 (70%)		76			
186	CHN	Luanfeng Li	76	2021/2022 (100%)					
186	CHN	Luanfeng Li	76	2020/2021 (100%)					
186	CHN	Luanfeng Li	76	2019/2020 (70%)		76			
186	USA	Dinh Tran	76	2021/2022 (100%)					
186	USA	Dinh Tran	76	2020/2021 (100%)					
186	USA	Dinh Tran	76	2019/2020 (70%)		76			
189	RUS	Matvei Vetlugin	68	2021/2022 (100%)					
189	RUS	Matvei Vetlugin	68	2020/2021 (100%)					
189	RUS	Matvei Vetlugin	68	2019/2020 (70%)		68			
190	HKG	Harrison Jon-Yen Wong	64	2021/2022 (100%)					
190	HKG	Harrison Jon-Yen Wong	64	2020/2021 (100%)					
190	HKG	Harrison Jon-Yen Wong	64	2019/2020 (70%)	64				
191	TPE	Chih-I Tsao	58	2021/2022 (100%)					
191	TPE	Chih-I Tsao	58	2020/2021 (100%)					
191	TPE	Chih-I Tsao	58	2019/2020 (70%)	58				
192	GEO	Konstantin Supatashvili	55	2021/2022 (100%)	55				
192	GEO	Konstantin Supatashvili	55	2020/2021 (100%)					
192	GEO	Konstantin Supatashvili	55	2019/2020 (70%)					

==== Women ====
As of May 28, 2022.

Rank	Nation	Skater	Points	Season	ISU Championships or Olympics	(Junior) Grand Prix and Final		Selected International Competition	
Rank	Nation	Skater	Points	Season	Best	Best	2nd Best	Best	2nd Best
1	RUS	Anna Shcherbakova	4419	2021/2022 (100%)	1200	400	400	225	
1	RUS	Anna Shcherbakova	4419	2020/2021 (100%)	1200				
1	RUS	Anna Shcherbakova	4419	2019/2020 (70%)	(529)	504	280	210	
2	RUS	Alexandra Trusova	3646	2021/2022 (100%)	1080	400		250	
2	RUS	Alexandra Trusova	3646	2020/2021 (100%)	972				
2	RUS	Alexandra Trusova	3646	2019/2020 (70%)	(476)	454	280	210	
3	JPN	Kaori Sakamoto	3423	2021/2022 (100%)	1200	400	292	225	
3	JPN	Kaori Sakamoto	3423	2020/2021 (100%)	709				
3	JPN	Kaori Sakamoto	3423	2019/2020 (70%)	(386)	204	204	189	
4	KOR	Young You	3254	2021/2022 (100%)	787	324	324	270	225
4	KOR	Young You	3254	2020/2021 (100%)					
4	KOR	Young You	3254	2019/2020 (70%)	529	227	204	189	175
5	RUS	Elizaveta Tuktamysheva	2923	2021/2022 (100%)		360	360	270	
5	RUS	Elizaveta Tuktamysheva	2923	2020/2021 (100%)	1080				
5	RUS	Elizaveta Tuktamysheva	2923	2019/2020 (70%)		227	227	210	189
6	USA	Alysa Liu	2806	2021/2022 (100%)	972	292	262	300	300
6	USA	Alysa Liu	2806	2020/2021 (100%)					
6	USA	Alysa Liu	2806	2019/2020 (70%)	284	221	175		
7	RUS	Kamila Valieva	2745	2021/2022 (100%)	875	400	400	300	
7	RUS	Kamila Valieva	2745	2020/2021 (100%)					
7	RUS	Kamila Valieva	2745	2019/2020 (70%)	350	245	175		
8	BEL	Loena Hendrickx	2672	2021/2022 (100%)	1080	324	262	219	
8	BEL	Loena Hendrickx	2672	2020/2021 (100%)	787				
8	BEL	Loena Hendrickx	2672	2019/2020 (70%)					
9	RUS	Alena Kostornaia	2565	2021/2022 (100%)		360	324	243	
9	RUS	Alena Kostornaia	2565	2020/2021 (100%)					
9	RUS	Alena Kostornaia	2565	2019/2020 (70%)	588	560	280	210	
10	USA	Karen Chen	2553	2021/2022 (100%)	574	262		219	178
10	USA	Karen Chen	2553	2020/2021 (100%)	875				
10	USA	Karen Chen	2553	2019/2020 (70%)	(312)	134		158	153
11	JPN	Wakaba Higuchi	2506	2021/2022 (100%)	787	324	236	300	
11	JPN	Wakaba Higuchi	2506	2020/2021 (100%)					
11	JPN	Wakaba Higuchi	2506	2019/2020 (70%)	428	165	165	101	
12	JPN	Rika Kihira	2271	2021/2022 (100%)					
12	JPN	Rika Kihira	2271	2020/2021 (100%)	638				
12	JPN	Rika Kihira	2271	2019/2020 (70%)	588	408	252	210	175
13	USA	Mariah Bell	2270	2021/2022 (100%)	875	292	236	203	
13	USA	Mariah Bell	2270	2020/2021 (100%)					
13	USA	Mariah Bell	2270	2019/2020 (70%)		227	227	210	
14	AZE	Ekaterina Ryabova	2138	2021/2022 (100%)	517	213		270	250
14	AZE	Ekaterina Ryabova	2138	2020/2021 (100%)	377				
14	AZE	Ekaterina Ryabova	2138	2019/2020 (70%)	(347)	183		170	158
15	KOR	Yelim Kim	2016	2021/2022 (100%)	680	236	191		
15	KOR	Yelim Kim	2016	2020/2021 (100%)	418				
15	KOR	Yelim Kim	2016	2019/2020 (70%)	(347)	149		189	153
16	KOR	Haein Lee	2009	2021/2022 (100%)	756	213		225	
16	KOR	Haein Lee	2009	2020/2021 (100%)	465				
16	KOR	Haein Lee	2009	2019/2020 (70%)	(230)	175	175		
17	POL	Ekaterina Kurakova	1912	2021/2022 (100%)	551			270	270
17	POL	Ekaterina Kurakova	1912	2020/2021 (100%)					
17	POL	Ekaterina Kurakova	1912	2019/2020 (70%)	228	115	93	210	175
18	USA	Bradie Tennell	1802	2021/2022 (100%)					
18	USA	Bradie Tennell	1802	2020/2021 (100%)	517				
18	USA	Bradie Tennell	1802	2019/2020 (70%)	476	368	252	189	
19	GER	Nicole Schott	1789	2021/2022 (100%)	465	191		225	219
19	GER	Nicole Schott	1789	2020/2021 (100%)	200				
19	GER	Nicole Schott	1789	2019/2020 (70%)	(166)	149		170	170
20	RUS	Maiia Khromykh	1759	2021/2022 (100%)		360	324	300	250
20	RUS	Maiia Khromykh	1759	2020/2021 (100%)					
20	RUS	Maiia Khromykh	1759	2019/2020 (70%)	256	142	127		
21	JPN	Mai Mihara	1674	2021/2022 (100%)	840	292	292	250	
21	JPN	Mai Mihara	1674	2020/2021 (100%)					
21	JPN	Mai Mihara	1674	2019/2020 (70%)					
22	BLR	Viktoriia Safonova	1632	2021/2022 (100%)	362	213		300	243
22	BLR	Viktoriia Safonova	1632	2020/2021 (100%)					
22	BLR	Viktoriia Safonova	1632	2019/2020 (70%)	150			189	175
23	USA	Starr Andrews	1520	2021/2022 (100%)	362			198	198
23	USA	Starr Andrews	1520	2020/2021 (100%)					
23	USA	Starr Andrews	1520	2019/2020 (70%)	167	183	134	139	139
24	JPN	Satoko Miyahara	1496	2021/2022 (100%)		262	213		
24	JPN	Satoko Miyahara	1496	2020/2021 (100%)	180				
24	JPN	Satoko Miyahara	1496	2019/2020 (70%)		252	204	210	175
25	SUI	Alexia Paganini	1465	2021/2022 (100%)	325			219	219
25	SUI	Alexia Paganini	1465	2020/2021 (100%)					
25	SUI	Alexia Paganini	1465	2019/2020 (70%)	428	149		125	
26	USA	Amber Glenn	1456	2021/2022 (100%)		236	213	270	
26	USA	Amber Glenn	1456	2020/2021 (100%)					
26	USA	Amber Glenn	1456	2019/2020 (70%)	253	165	149	170	
27	CAN	Madeline Schizas	1449	2021/2022 (100%)	377	236	191	164	
27	CAN	Madeline Schizas	1449	2020/2021 (100%)	339				
27	CAN	Madeline Schizas	1449	2019/2020 (70%)				142	
28	KOR	Eunsoo Lim	1446	2021/2022 (100%)		262	191		
28	KOR	Eunsoo Lim	1446	2020/2021 (100%)					
28	KOR	Eunsoo Lim	1446	2019/2020 (70%)	281	183	149	210	170
29	EST	Niina Petrokina	1402	2021/2022 (100%)	402	182	133	270	243
29	EST	Niina Petrokina	1402	2020/2021 (100%)					
29	EST	Niina Petrokina	1402	2019/2020 (70%)		104	68		
30	JPN	Rino Matsuike	1370	2021/2022 (100%)	551	236	191	250	
30	JPN	Rino Matsuike	1370	2020/2021 (100%)					
30	JPN	Rino Matsuike	1370	2019/2020 (70%)		142			
31	USA	Lindsay Thorngren	1365	2021/2022 (100%)	405	250	203	225	198
31	USA	Lindsay Thorngren	1365	2020/2021 (100%)					
31	USA	Lindsay Thorngren	1365	2019/2020 (70%)		84			
32	GEO	Alina Urushadze	1331	2021/2022 (100%)		133		250	164
32	GEO	Alina Urushadze	1331	2020/2021 (100%)	162				
32	GEO	Alina Urushadze	1331	2019/2020 (70%)	134	104	84	158	142
33	EST	Eva-Lotta Kiibus	1237	2021/2022 (100%)	(293)			160	
33	EST	Eva-Lotta Kiibus	1237	2020/2021 (100%)	305				
33	EST	Eva-Lotta Kiibus	1237	2019/2020 (70%)	312	93	84	158	125
34	AUT	Olga Mikutina	1212	2021/2022 (100%)	305				
34	AUT	Olga Mikutina	1212	2020/2021 (100%)	574				
34	AUT	Olga Mikutina	1212	2019/2020 (70%)	(52)			175	158
35	GEO	Anastasiia Gubanova	1207	2021/2022 (100%)	709			300	198
35	GEO	Anastasiia Gubanova	1207	2020/2021 (100%)					
35	GEO	Anastasiia Gubanova	1207	2019/2020 (70%)					
36	USA	Gabriella Izzo	1154	2021/2022 (100%)	402			219	203
36	USA	Gabriella Izzo	1154	2020/2021 (100%)					
36	USA	Gabriella Izzo	1154	2019/2020 (70%)		84	76	170	
37	JPN	Yuhana Yokoi	1143	2021/2022 (100%)	446				
37	JPN	Yuhana Yokoi	1143	2020/2021 (100%)					
37	JPN	Yuhana Yokoi	1143	2019/2020 (70%)		204	165	170	158
38	FIN	Emmi Peltonen	1140	2021/2022 (100%)				250	219
38	FIN	Emmi Peltonen	1140	2020/2021 (100%)					
38	FIN	Emmi Peltonen	1140	2019/2020 (70%)	386			158	127
39	BUL	Alexandra Feigin	1135	2021/2022 (100%)	113			225	225
39	BUL	Alexandra Feigin	1135	2020/2021 (100%)	222				
39	BUL	Alexandra Feigin	1135	2019/2020 (70%)	(109)			175	175
40	RUS	Sofia Samodurova	1127	2021/2022 (100%)		213		203	
40	RUS	Sofia Samodurova	1127	2020/2021 (100%)					
40	RUS	Sofia Samodurova	1127	2019/2020 (70%)		183	165	210	153
41	ITA	Lara Naki Gutmann	1126	2021/2022 (100%)	173			225	198
41	ITA	Lara Naki Gutmann	1126	2020/2021 (100%)					
41	ITA	Lara Naki Gutmann	1126	2019/2020 (70%)		104	93	175	158
42	USA	Audrey Shin	1074	2021/2022 (100%)	612			243	219
42	USA	Audrey Shin	1074	2020/2021 (100%)					
42	USA	Audrey Shin	1074	2019/2020 (70%)					
43	SWE	Josefin Taljegard	1067	2021/2022 (100%)	214			250	203
43	SWE	Josefin Taljegard	1067	2020/2021 (100%)	275				
43	SWE	Josefin Taljegard	1067	2019/2020 (70%)				125	
44	FIN	Linnea Ceder	1065	2021/2022 (100%)	157			203	182
44	FIN	Linnea Ceder	1065	2020/2021 (100%)					
44	FIN	Linnea Ceder	1065	2019/2020 (70%)	185	84		142	112
45	AUS	Kailani Craine	1045	2021/2022 (100%)	264			160	144
45	AUS	Kailani Craine	1045	2020/2021 (100%)					
45	AUS	Kailani Craine	1045	2019/2020 (70%)	185			153	139
46	RUS	Daria Usacheva	1032	2021/2022 (100%)		360			
46	RUS	Daria Usacheva	1032	2020/2021 (100%)					
46	RUS	Daria Usacheva	1032	2019/2020 (70%)	315	199	158		
47	JPN	Mana Kawabe	999	2021/2022 (100%)	275	360			
47	JPN	Mana Kawabe	999	2020/2021 (100%)					
47	JPN	Mana Kawabe	999	2019/2020 (70%)	122	127	115		
48	FRA	Lea Serna	994	2021/2022 (100%)	264			250	225
48	FRA	Lea Serna	994	2020/2021 (100%)					
48	FRA	Lea Serna	994	2019/2020 (70%)	121	134			
49	CZE	Eliska Brezinova	990	2021/2022 (100%)	162			225	203
49	CZE	Eliska Brezinova	990	2020/2021 (100%)	131				
49	CZE	Eliska Brezinova	990	2019/2020 (70%)	(64)			142	127
50	SLO	Dasa Grm	985	2021/2022 (100%)	106			250	250
50	SLO	Dasa Grm	985	2020/2021 (100%)					
50	SLO	Dasa Grm	985	2019/2020 (70%)	79			158	142
51	USA	Isabeau Levito	975	2021/2022 (100%)	500	250	225		
51	USA	Isabeau Levito	975	2020/2021 (100%)					
51	USA	Isabeau Levito	975	2019/2020 (70%)					
52	KOR	Yeonjeong Park	959	2021/2022 (100%)		191		270	225
52	KOR	Yeonjeong Park	959	2020/2021 (100%)					
52	KOR	Yeonjeong Park	959	2019/2020 (70%)		158	115		
53	RUS	Kseniia Sinitsyna	908	2021/2022 (100%)		292	262		
53	RUS	Kseniia Sinitsyna	908	2020/2021 (100%)					
53	RUS	Kseniia Sinitsyna	908	2019/2020 (70%)		179	175		
54	SUI	Yasmine Kimiko Yamada	901	2021/2022 (100%)	126			225	178
54	SUI	Yasmine Kimiko Yamada	901	2020/2021 (100%)					
54	SUI	Yasmine Kimiko Yamada	901	2019/2020 (70%)	88			142	142
55	NED	Lindsay Van Zundert	879	2021/2022 (100%)	222			250	160
55	NED	Lindsay Van Zundert	879	2020/2021 (100%)	247				
55	NED	Lindsay Van Zundert	879	2019/2020 (70%)					
56	FIN	Jenni Saarinen	869	2021/2022 (100%)	140			164	164
56	FIN	Jenni Saarinen	869	2020/2021 (100%)	106				
56	FIN	Jenni Saarinen	869	2019/2020 (70%)				153	142
57	KOR	Seoyeon Ji	838	2021/2022 (100%)		182	182	243	
57	KOR	Seoyeon Ji	838	2020/2021 (100%)					
57	KOR	Seoyeon Ji	838	2019/2020 (70%)		127	104		
58	HUN	Julia Lang	829	2021/2022 (100%)				225	203
58	HUN	Julia Lang	829	2020/2021 (100%)					
58	HUN	Julia Lang	829	2019/2020 (70%)		68		175	158
59	ITA	Alessia Tornaghi	827	2021/2022 (100%)					
59	ITA	Alessia Tornaghi	827	2020/2021 (100%)					
59	ITA	Alessia Tornaghi	827	2019/2020 (70%)	281	142	76	175	153
60	ITA	Lucrezia Beccari	825	2021/2022 (100%)				250	225
60	ITA	Lucrezia Beccari	825	2020/2021 (100%)					
60	ITA	Lucrezia Beccari	825	2019/2020 (70%)				175	175
61	GBR	Natasha Mckay	824	2021/2022 (100%)	156			250	
61	GBR	Natasha Mckay	824	2020/2021 (100%)	118				
61	GBR	Natasha Mckay	824	2019/2020 (70%)	(58)			158	142
62	KOR	Seoyeong Wi	820	2021/2022 (100%)	328				
62	KOR	Seoyeong Wi	820	2020/2021 (100%)					
62	KOR	Seoyeong Wi	820	2019/2020 (70%)	207	158	127		
63	KOR	Jia Shin	801	2021/2022 (100%)	450	203	148		
63	KOR	Jia Shin	801	2020/2021 (100%)					
63	KOR	Jia Shin	801	2019/2020 (70%)					
64	FRA	Maia Mazzara	756	2021/2022 (100%)				182	178
64	FRA	Maia Mazzara	756	2020/2021 (100%)					
64	FRA	Maia Mazzara	756	2019/2020 (70%)	205	76		115	
65	AUT	Sophia Schaller	732	2021/2022 (100%)				250	225
65	AUT	Sophia Schaller	732	2020/2021 (100%)					
65	AUT	Sophia Schaller	732	2019/2020 (70%)				142	115
66	AUT	Stefanie Pesendorfer	708	2021/2022 (100%)				250	203
66	AUT	Stefanie Pesendorfer	708	2020/2021 (100%)					
66	AUT	Stefanie Pesendorfer	708	2019/2020 (70%)	80			175	
67	LAT	Angelina Kuchvalska	694	2021/2022 (100%)				225	203
67	LAT	Angelina Kuchvalska	694	2020/2021 (100%)					
67	LAT	Angelina Kuchvalska	694	2019/2020 (70%)				139	127
68	KOR	Ahsun Yun	693	2021/2022 (100%)	365	164	164		
68	KOR	Ahsun Yun	693	2020/2021 (100%)					
68	KOR	Ahsun Yun	693	2019/2020 (70%)					
69	CAN	Emily Bausback	683	2021/2022 (100%)				160	160
69	CAN	Emily Bausback	683	2020/2021 (100%)					
69	CAN	Emily Bausback	683	2019/2020 (70%)	134	104		125	
70	USA	Clare Seo	680	2021/2022 (100%)	295	203	182		
70	USA	Clare Seo	680	2020/2021 (100%)					
70	USA	Clare Seo	680	2019/2020 (70%)					
71	TPE	Tzu-Han Ting	664	2021/2022 (100%)	192			225	182
71	TPE	Tzu-Han Ting	664	2020/2021 (100%)					
71	TPE	Tzu-Han Ting	664	2019/2020 (70%)	65				
72	CAN	Alison Schumacher	638	2021/2022 (100%)	293				
72	CAN	Alison Schumacher	638	2020/2021 (100%)					
72	CAN	Alison Schumacher	638	2019/2020 (70%)	151	93		101	
73	CAN	Gabrielle Daleman	629	2021/2022 (100%)	325			160	144
73	CAN	Gabrielle Daleman	629	2020/2021 (100%)					
73	CAN	Gabrielle Daleman	629	2019/2020 (70%)					
74	RUS	Evgenia Medvedeva	624	2021/2022 (100%)					
74	RUS	Evgenia Medvedeva	624	2020/2021 (100%)					
74	RUS	Evgenia Medvedeva	624	2019/2020 (70%)		252	183	189	
75	JPN	Marin Honda	611	2021/2022 (100%)					
75	JPN	Marin Honda	611	2020/2021 (100%)					
75	JPN	Marin Honda	611	2019/2020 (70%)		165	149	158	139
76	ROU	Julia Sauter	606	2021/2022 (100%)	200			203	203
76	ROU	Julia Sauter	606	2020/2021 (100%)					
76	ROU	Julia Sauter	606	2019/2020 (70%)					
77	UKR	Anastasiia Shabotova	586	2021/2022 (100%)		97		243	198
77	UKR	Anastasiia Shabotova	586	2020/2021 (100%)					
77	UKR	Anastasiia Shabotova	586	2019/2020 (70%)	48				
78	RUS	Alina Zagitova	582	2021/2022 (100%)					
78	RUS	Alina Zagitova	582	2020/2021 (100%)					
78	RUS	Alina Zagitova	582	2019/2020 (70%)		330	252		
79	FIN	Oona Ounasvuori	568	2021/2022 (100%)				250	203
79	FIN	Oona Ounasvuori	568	2020/2021 (100%)					
79	FIN	Oona Ounasvuori	568	2019/2020 (70%)				115	
80	JPN	Rion Sumiyoshi	548	2021/2022 (100%)	239			225	
80	JPN	Rion Sumiyoshi	548	2020/2021 (100%)					
80	JPN	Rion Sumiyoshi	548	2019/2020 (70%)		84			
81	CAN	Kaiya Ruiter	532	2021/2022 (100%)		225	203		
81	CAN	Kaiya Ruiter	532	2020/2021 (100%)					
81	CAN	Kaiya Ruiter	532	2019/2020 (70%)		104			
82	FRA	Mae Berenice Meite	529	2021/2022 (100%)				164	
82	FRA	Mae Berenice Meite	529	2020/2021 (100%)					
82	FRA	Mae Berenice Meite	529	2019/2020 (70%)	253			112	
83	FIN	Olivia Lisko	503	2021/2022 (100%)		97		203	203
83	FIN	Olivia Lisko	503	2020/2021 (100%)					
83	FIN	Olivia Lisko	503	2019/2020 (70%)					
84	RUS	Sofia Akateva	500	2021/2022 (100%)		250	250		
84	RUS	Sofia Akateva	500	2020/2021 (100%)					
84	RUS	Sofia Akateva	500	2019/2020 (70%)					
85	CYP	Marilena Kitromilis	498	2021/2022 (100%)				300	198
85	CYP	Marilena Kitromilis	498	2020/2021 (100%)					
85	CYP	Marilena Kitromilis	498	2019/2020 (70%)					
86	BEL	Nina Pinzarrone	486	2021/2022 (100%)	174	164	148		
86	BEL	Nina Pinzarrone	486	2020/2021 (100%)					
86	BEL	Nina Pinzarrone	486	2019/2020 (70%)					
87	CHN	Hongyi Chen	485	2021/2022 (100%)					
87	CHN	Hongyi Chen	485	2020/2021 (100%)	146				
87	CHN	Hongyi Chen	485	2019/2020 (70%)	205	134			
88	RUS	Sofia Muravieva	475	2021/2022 (100%)		250	225		
88	RUS	Sofia Muravieva	475	2020/2021 (100%)					
88	RUS	Sofia Muravieva	475	2019/2020 (70%)					
89	SRB	Antonina Dubinina	473	2021/2022 (100%)				182	164
89	SRB	Antonina Dubinina	473	2020/2021 (100%)					
89	SRB	Antonina Dubinina	473	2019/2020 (70%)				127	
90	RUS	Serafima Sakhanovich	462	2021/2022 (100%)					
90	RUS	Serafima Sakhanovich	462	2020/2021 (100%)					
90	RUS	Serafima Sakhanovich	462	2019/2020 (70%)		134		175	153
91	IND	Tara Prasad	459	2021/2022 (100%)	113			182	164
91	IND	Tara Prasad	459	2020/2021 (100%)					
91	IND	Tara Prasad	459	2019/2020 (70%)					
92	RUS	Adeliia Petrosian	453	2021/2022 (100%)		250	203		
92	RUS	Adeliia Petrosian	453	2020/2021 (100%)					
92	RUS	Adeliia Petrosian	453	2019/2020 (70%)					
93	JPN	Rinka Watanabe	444	2021/2022 (100%)	194			250	
93	JPN	Rinka Watanabe	444	2020/2021 (100%)					
93	JPN	Rinka Watanabe	444	2019/2020 (70%)					
94	RUS	Sofia Samodelkina	428	2021/2022 (100%)		225	203		
94	RUS	Sofia Samodelkina	428	2020/2021 (100%)					
94	RUS	Sofia Samodelkina	428	2019/2020 (70%)					
94	RUS	Anastasia Zinina	428	2021/2022 (100%)		225	203		
94	RUS	Anastasia Zinina	428	2020/2021 (100%)					
94	RUS	Anastasia Zinina	428	2019/2020 (70%)					
96	ISR	Taylor Morris	419	2021/2022 (100%)				203	
96	ISR	Taylor Morris	419	2020/2021 (100%)					
96	ISR	Taylor Morris	419	2019/2020 (70%)				115	101
97	NZL	Jocelyn Hong	417	2021/2022 (100%)	214			203	
97	NZL	Jocelyn Hong	417	2020/2021 (100%)					
97	NZL	Jocelyn Hong	417	2019/2020 (70%)					
98	ITA	Ginevra Lavinia Negrello	415	2021/2022 (100%)		97		250	
98	ITA	Ginevra Lavinia Negrello	415	2020/2021 (100%)					
98	ITA	Ginevra Lavinia Negrello	415	2019/2020 (70%)		68			
99	GER	Kristina Isaev	410	2021/2022 (100%)				250	160
99	GER	Kristina Isaev	410	2020/2021 (100%)					
99	GER	Kristina Isaev	410	2019/2020 (70%)					
100	BLR	Milana Ramashova	408	2021/2022 (100%)		120		178	
100	BLR	Milana Ramashova	408	2020/2021 (100%)					
100	BLR	Milana Ramashova	408	2019/2020 (70%)	110				
101	RUS	Elizaveta Kulikova	407	2021/2022 (100%)		225	182		
101	RUS	Elizaveta Kulikova	407	2020/2021 (100%)					
101	RUS	Elizaveta Kulikova	407	2019/2020 (70%)					
102	MEX	Andrea Montesinos Cantu	400	2021/2022 (100%)	140				
102	MEX	Andrea Montesinos Cantu	400	2020/2021 (100%)					
102	MEX	Andrea Montesinos Cantu	400	2019/2020 (70%)	121			139	
102	USA	Kate Wang	400	2021/2022 (100%)		148	148		
102	USA	Kate Wang	400	2020/2021 (100%)					
102	USA	Kate Wang	400	2019/2020 (70%)		104			
104	USA	Hanna Harrell	395	2021/2022 (100%)				160	
104	USA	Hanna Harrell	395	2020/2021 (100%)					
104	USA	Hanna Harrell	395	2019/2020 (70%)		93		142	
105	NOR	Linnea Kilsand	389	2021/2022 (100%)				225	164
105	NOR	Linnea Kilsand	389	2020/2021 (100%)					
105	NOR	Linnea Kilsand	389	2019/2020 (70%)					
105	KOR	Chaeyeon Kim	389	2021/2022 (100%)		225	164		
105	KOR	Chaeyeon Kim	389	2020/2021 (100%)					
105	KOR	Chaeyeon Kim	389	2019/2020 (70%)					
105	SVK	Alexandra Michaela Filcova	389	2021/2022 (100%)				225	164
105	SVK	Alexandra Michaela Filcova	389	2020/2021 (100%)					
105	SVK	Alexandra Michaela Filcova	389	2019/2020 (70%)					
108	SUI	Kimmy Repond	386	2021/2022 (100%)	266	120			
108	SUI	Kimmy Repond	386	2020/2021 (100%)					
108	SUI	Kimmy Repond	386	2019/2020 (70%)					
109	KOR	Hanul Kim	378	2021/2022 (100%)					
109	KOR	Hanul Kim	378	2020/2021 (100%)					
109	KOR	Hanul Kim	378	2019/2020 (70%)				189	189
110	LTU	Jogaile Aglinskyte	372	2021/2022 (100%)	44			164	164
110	LTU	Jogaile Aglinskyte	372	2020/2021 (100%)					
110	LTU	Jogaile Aglinskyte	372	2019/2020 (70%)					
111	EST	Kristina Shkuleta-Gromova	365	2021/2022 (100%)				250	
111	EST	Kristina Shkuleta-Gromova	365	2020/2021 (100%)					
111	EST	Kristina Shkuleta-Gromova	365	2019/2020 (70%)				115	
112	BEL	Jade Hovine	364	2021/2022 (100%)				182	182
112	BEL	Jade Hovine	364	2020/2021 (100%)					
112	BEL	Jade Hovine	364	2019/2020 (70%)					
113	GER	Nargiz Sueleymanova	351	2021/2022 (100%)		120		178	
113	GER	Nargiz Sueleymanova	351	2020/2021 (100%)					
113	GER	Nargiz Sueleymanova	351	2019/2020 (70%)	53				
114	POL	Noelle Streuli	344	2021/2022 (100%)	114	133	97		
114	POL	Noelle Streuli	344	2020/2021 (100%)					
114	POL	Noelle Streuli	344	2019/2020 (70%)					
115	CAN	Alicia Pineault	340	2021/2022 (100%)					
115	CAN	Alicia Pineault	340	2020/2021 (100%)					
115	CAN	Alicia Pineault	340	2019/2020 (70%)	228			112	
115	POL	Elzbieta Gabryszak	340	2021/2022 (100%)				182	
115	POL	Elzbieta Gabryszak	340	2020/2021 (100%)					
115	POL	Elzbieta Gabryszak	340	2019/2020 (70%)				158	
117	HUN	Regina Schermann	339	2021/2022 (100%)	83			225	
117	HUN	Regina Schermann	339	2020/2021 (100%)					
117	HUN	Regina Schermann	339	2019/2020 (70%)	31				
117	ITA	Roberta Rodeghiero	339	2021/2022 (100%)				164	
117	ITA	Roberta Rodeghiero	339	2020/2021 (100%)					
117	ITA	Roberta Rodeghiero	339	2019/2020 (70%)				175	
119	PHI	Sofia Lexi Jacqueline Frank	337	2021/2022 (100%)	173			164	
119	PHI	Sofia Lexi Jacqueline Frank	337	2020/2021 (100%)					
119	PHI	Sofia Lexi Jacqueline Frank	337	2019/2020 (70%)					
120	RUS	Anastasiia Guliakova	333	2021/2022 (100%)					
120	RUS	Anastasiia Guliakova	333	2020/2021 (100%)					
120	RUS	Anastasiia Guliakova	333	2019/2020 (70%)				175	158
121	JPN	Tomoe Kawabata	319	2021/2022 (100%)					
121	JPN	Tomoe Kawabata	319	2020/2021 (100%)					
121	JPN	Tomoe Kawabata	319	2019/2020 (70%)	89	115	115		
122	ARM	Anastasiya Galustyan	317	2021/2022 (100%)					
122	ARM	Anastasiya Galustyan	317	2020/2021 (100%)					
122	ARM	Anastasiya Galustyan	317	2019/2020 (70%)				175	142
123	FIN	Laura Karhunen	309	2021/2022 (100%)				182	
123	FIN	Laura Karhunen	309	2020/2021 (100%)					
123	FIN	Laura Karhunen	309	2019/2020 (70%)				127	
124	JPN	Mako Yamashita	308	2021/2022 (100%)					
124	JPN	Mako Yamashita	308	2020/2021 (100%)					
124	JPN	Mako Yamashita	308	2019/2020 (70%)		183		125	
125	FRA	Lorine Schild	306	2021/2022 (100%)	103			203	
125	FRA	Lorine Schild	306	2020/2021 (100%)					
125	FRA	Lorine Schild	306	2019/2020 (70%)					
126	KOR	Siwon Lee	303	2021/2022 (100%)				178	
126	KOR	Siwon Lee	303	2020/2021 (100%)					
126	KOR	Siwon Lee	303	2019/2020 (70%)				125	
126	RUS	Viktoria Vasilieva	303	2021/2022 (100%)					
126	RUS	Viktoria Vasilieva	303	2020/2021 (100%)					
126	RUS	Viktoria Vasilieva	303	2019/2020 (70%)		158	145		
128	RUS	Anna Frolova	300	2021/2022 (100%)					
128	RUS	Anna Frolova	300	2020/2021 (100%)					
128	RUS	Anna Frolova	300	2019/2020 (70%)		158	142		
129	HUN	Ivett Toth	299	2021/2022 (100%)					
129	HUN	Ivett Toth	299	2020/2021 (100%)					
129	HUN	Ivett Toth	299	2019/2020 (70%)	71			127	101
130	BLR	Varvara Kisel	297	2021/2022 (100%)		164	133		
130	BLR	Varvara Kisel	297	2020/2021 (100%)					
130	BLR	Varvara Kisel	297	2019/2020 (70%)					
130	TUR	Sinem Pekder	297	2021/2022 (100%)				182	
130	TUR	Sinem Pekder	297	2020/2021 (100%)					
130	TUR	Sinem Pekder	297	2019/2020 (70%)				115	
130	USA	Sierra Venetta	297	2021/2022 (100%)				182	
130	USA	Sierra Venetta	297	2020/2021 (100%)					
130	USA	Sierra Venetta	297	2019/2020 (70%)				115	
133	ITA	Marina Piredda	294	2021/2022 (100%)				182	
133	ITA	Marina Piredda	294	2020/2021 (100%)					
133	ITA	Marina Piredda	294	2019/2020 (70%)				112	
134	RUS	Anastasia Tarakanova	284	2021/2022 (100%)					
134	RUS	Anastasia Tarakanova	284	2020/2021 (100%)					
134	RUS	Anastasia Tarakanova	284	2019/2020 (70%)		142	142		
135	USA	Mia Kalin	281	2021/2022 (100%)		148	133		
135	USA	Mia Kalin	281	2020/2021 (100%)					
135	USA	Mia Kalin	281	2019/2020 (70%)					
135	USA	Ava Marie Ziegler	281	2021/2022 (100%)		148	133		
135	USA	Ava Marie Ziegler	281	2020/2021 (100%)					
135	USA	Ava Marie Ziegler	281	2019/2020 (70%)					
137	LTU	Aleksandra Golovkina	274	2021/2022 (100%)	92			182	
137	LTU	Aleksandra Golovkina	274	2020/2021 (100%)					
137	LTU	Aleksandra Golovkina	274	2019/2020 (70%)					
138	HKG	Yi Christy Leung	273	2021/2022 (100%)					
138	HKG	Yi Christy Leung	273	2020/2021 (100%)					
138	HKG	Yi Christy Leung	273	2019/2020 (70%)		134		139	
139	ITA	Chenny Paolucci	269	2021/2022 (100%)					
139	ITA	Chenny Paolucci	269	2020/2021 (100%)					
139	ITA	Chenny Paolucci	269	2019/2020 (70%)				142	127
140	SWE	Emelie Ling	265	2021/2022 (100%)	83			182	
140	SWE	Emelie Ling	265	2020/2021 (100%)					
140	SWE	Emelie Ling	265	2019/2020 (70%)					
141	JPN	Nana Araki	254	2021/2022 (100%)					
141	JPN	Nana Araki	254	2020/2021 (100%)					
141	JPN	Nana Araki	254	2019/2020 (70%)		127	127		
142	GBR	Kristen Spours	250	2021/2022 (100%)				250	
142	GBR	Kristen Spours	250	2020/2021 (100%)					
142	GBR	Kristen Spours	250	2019/2020 (70%)					
142	JPN	Hana Yoshida	250	2021/2022 (100%)				250	
142	JPN	Hana Yoshida	250	2020/2021 (100%)					
142	JPN	Hana Yoshida	250	2019/2020 (70%)					
142	ROU	Ana Sofia Beschea	250	2021/2022 (100%)				250	
142	ROU	Ana Sofia Beschea	250	2020/2021 (100%)					
142	ROU	Ana Sofia Beschea	250	2019/2020 (70%)					
142	RUS	Veronika Zhilina	250	2021/2022 (100%)		250			
142	RUS	Veronika Zhilina	250	2020/2021 (100%)					
142	RUS	Veronika Zhilina	250	2019/2020 (70%)					
146	LTU	Greta Morkyte	242	2021/2022 (100%)					
146	LTU	Greta Morkyte	242	2020/2021 (100%)					
146	LTU	Greta Morkyte	242	2019/2020 (70%)				127	115
147	KOR	Dabin Choi	239	2021/2022 (100%)					
147	KOR	Dabin Choi	239	2020/2021 (100%)					
147	KOR	Dabin Choi	239	2019/2020 (70%)				127	112
148	CAN	Veronik Mallet	237	2021/2022 (100%)	237				
148	CAN	Veronik Mallet	237	2020/2021 (100%)					
148	CAN	Veronik Mallet	237	2019/2020 (70%)					
149	JPN	Chisato Uramatsu	230	2021/2022 (100%)					
149	JPN	Chisato Uramatsu	230	2020/2021 (100%)					
149	JPN	Chisato Uramatsu	230	2019/2020 (70%)		115	115		
150	HUN	Vivien Papp	228	2021/2022 (100%)		120	108		
150	HUN	Vivien Papp	228	2020/2021 (100%)					
150	HUN	Vivien Papp	228	2019/2020 (70%)					
151	SVK	Ema Doboszova	225	2021/2022 (100%)				225	
151	SVK	Ema Doboszova	225	2020/2021 (100%)					
151	SVK	Ema Doboszova	225	2019/2020 (70%)					
151	SUI	Livia Kaiser	225	2021/2022 (100%)				225	
151	SUI	Livia Kaiser	225	2020/2021 (100%)					
151	SUI	Livia Kaiser	225	2019/2020 (70%)					
153	CAN	Lia Pereira	224	2021/2022 (100%)	127	97			
153	CAN	Lia Pereira	224	2020/2021 (100%)					
153	CAN	Lia Pereira	224	2019/2020 (70%)					
154	FIN	Janna Jyrkinen	216	2021/2022 (100%)		108	108		
154	FIN	Janna Jyrkinen	216	2020/2021 (100%)					
154	FIN	Janna Jyrkinen	216	2019/2020 (70%)					
154	USA	Megan Wessenberg	216	2021/2022 (100%)					
154	USA	Megan Wessenberg	216	2020/2021 (100%)					
154	USA	Megan Wessenberg	216	2019/2020 (70%)				115	101
156	BUL	Maria Levushkina	203	2021/2022 (100%)					
156	BUL	Maria Levushkina	203	2020/2021 (100%)					
156	BUL	Maria Levushkina	203	2019/2020 (70%)	34	93	76		
156	HKG	Joanna So	203	2021/2022 (100%)				203	
156	HKG	Joanna So	203	2020/2021 (100%)					
156	HKG	Joanna So	203	2019/2020 (70%)					
156	JPN	Mone Chiba	203	2021/2022 (100%)				203	
156	JPN	Mone Chiba	203	2020/2021 (100%)					
156	JPN	Mone Chiba	203	2019/2020 (70%)					
156	NOR	Frida Turiddotter Berge	203	2021/2022 (100%)				203	
156	NOR	Frida Turiddotter Berge	203	2020/2021 (100%)					
156	NOR	Frida Turiddotter Berge	203	2019/2020 (70%)					
160	SWE	Anita Ostlund	199	2021/2022 (100%)					
160	SWE	Anita Ostlund	199	2020/2021 (100%)					
160	SWE	Anita Ostlund	199	2019/2020 (70%)	98			101	
161	USA	Isabelle Inthisone	195	2021/2022 (100%)					
161	USA	Isabelle Inthisone	195	2020/2021 (100%)					
161	USA	Isabelle Inthisone	195	2019/2020 (70%)		127	68		
162	EST	Nataly Langerbaur	182	2021/2022 (100%)				182	
162	EST	Nataly Langerbaur	182	2020/2021 (100%)					
162	EST	Nataly Langerbaur	182	2019/2020 (70%)					
162	KAZ	Bagdana Rakhishova	182	2021/2022 (100%)				182	
162	KAZ	Bagdana Rakhishova	182	2020/2021 (100%)					
162	KAZ	Bagdana Rakhishova	182	2019/2020 (70%)					
162	KOR	Minchae Kim	182	2021/2022 (100%)		182			
162	KOR	Minchae Kim	182	2020/2021 (100%)					
162	KOR	Minchae Kim	182	2019/2020 (70%)					
162	RUS	Mariia Pulina	182	2021/2022 (100%)				182	
162	RUS	Mariia Pulina	182	2020/2021 (100%)					
162	RUS	Mariia Pulina	182	2019/2020 (70%)					
162	RUS	Mariia Zakharova	182	2021/2022 (100%)		182			
162	RUS	Mariia Zakharova	182	2020/2021 (100%)					
162	RUS	Mariia Zakharova	182	2019/2020 (70%)					
167	NED	Kyarha Van Tiel	175	2021/2022 (100%)					
167	NED	Kyarha Van Tiel	175	2020/2021 (100%)					
167	NED	Kyarha Van Tiel	175	2019/2020 (70%)				175	
167	RUS	Ksenia Tsibinova	175	2021/2022 (100%)					
167	RUS	Ksenia Tsibinova	175	2020/2021 (100%)					
167	RUS	Ksenia Tsibinova	175	2019/2020 (70%)				175	
169	RUS	Elizaveta Nugumanova	170	2021/2022 (100%)					
169	RUS	Elizaveta Nugumanova	170	2020/2021 (100%)					
169	RUS	Elizaveta Nugumanova	170	2019/2020 (70%)				170	
170	CHN	Yi Zhu	166	2021/2022 (100%)					
170	CHN	Yi Zhu	166	2020/2021 (100%)					
170	CHN	Yi Zhu	166	2019/2020 (70%)	166				
171	BUL	Ivelina Baycheva	164	2021/2022 (100%)				164	
171	BUL	Ivelina Baycheva	164	2020/2021 (100%)					
171	BUL	Ivelina Baycheva	164	2019/2020 (70%)					
171	BUL	Kristina Grigorova	164	2021/2022 (100%)				164	
171	BUL	Kristina Grigorova	164	2020/2021 (100%)					
171	BUL	Kristina Grigorova	164	2019/2020 (70%)					
171	CHI	Yae-Mia Neira	164	2021/2022 (100%)				164	
171	CHI	Yae-Mia Neira	164	2020/2021 (100%)					
171	CHI	Yae-Mia Neira	164	2019/2020 (70%)					
171	CZE	Nikola Rychtarikova	164	2021/2022 (100%)				164	
171	CZE	Nikola Rychtarikova	164	2020/2021 (100%)					
171	CZE	Nikola Rychtarikova	164	2019/2020 (70%)					
171	HUN	Bernadett Szigeti	164	2021/2022 (100%)				164	
171	HUN	Bernadett Szigeti	164	2020/2021 (100%)					
171	HUN	Bernadett Szigeti	164	2019/2020 (70%)					
171	ITA	Ester Schwarz	164	2021/2022 (100%)				164	
171	ITA	Ester Schwarz	164	2020/2021 (100%)					
171	ITA	Ester Schwarz	164	2019/2020 (70%)					
171	KOR	Heesue Han	164	2021/2022 (100%)		164			
171	KOR	Heesue Han	164	2020/2021 (100%)					
171	KOR	Heesue Han	164	2019/2020 (70%)					
171	RUS	Elizaveta Berestovskaia	164	2021/2022 (100%)		164			
171	RUS	Elizaveta Berestovskaia	164	2020/2021 (100%)					
171	RUS	Elizaveta Berestovskaia	164	2019/2020 (70%)					
171	SUI	Shaline Ruegger	164	2021/2022 (100%)				164	
171	SUI	Shaline Ruegger	164	2020/2021 (100%)					
171	SUI	Shaline Ruegger	164	2019/2020 (70%)					
171	USA	Paige Rydberg	164	2021/2022 (100%)				164	
171	USA	Paige Rydberg	164	2020/2021 (100%)					
171	USA	Paige Rydberg	164	2019/2020 (70%)					
181	UKR	Maryna Zhdanovych	158	2021/2022 (100%)					
181	UKR	Maryna Zhdanovych	158	2020/2021 (100%)					
181	UKR	Maryna Zhdanovych	158	2019/2020 (70%)				158	
181	USA	Emily Zhang	158	2021/2022 (100%)					
181	USA	Emily Zhang	158	2020/2021 (100%)					
181	USA	Emily Zhang	158	2019/2020 (70%)				158	
183	AUS	Victoria Alcantara	156	2021/2022 (100%)	156				
183	AUS	Victoria Alcantara	156	2020/2021 (100%)					
183	AUS	Victoria Alcantara	156	2019/2020 (70%)					
184	USA	Ting Cui	153	2021/2022 (100%)					
184	USA	Ting Cui	153	2020/2021 (100%)					
184	USA	Ting Cui	153	2019/2020 (70%)				153	
185	FRA	Lola Ghozali	148	2021/2022 (100%)		148			
185	FRA	Lola Ghozali	148	2020/2021 (100%)					
185	FRA	Lola Ghozali	148	2019/2020 (70%)					
186	ITA	Lucrezia Gennaro	144	2021/2022 (100%)					
186	ITA	Lucrezia Gennaro	144	2020/2021 (100%)					
186	ITA	Lucrezia Gennaro	144	2019/2020 (70%)		76	68		
186	KAZ	Anastassiya Lobanova	144	2021/2022 (100%)				144	
186	KAZ	Anastassiya Lobanova	144	2020/2021 (100%)					
186	KAZ	Anastassiya Lobanova	144	2019/2020 (70%)					
188	ISR	Alina Iushchenkova	142	2021/2022 (100%)					
188	ISR	Alina Iushchenkova	142	2020/2021 (100%)					
188	ISR	Alina Iushchenkova	142	2019/2020 (70%)				142	
188	NED	Niki Wories	142	2021/2022 (100%)					
188	NED	Niki Wories	142	2020/2021 (100%)					
188	NED	Niki Wories	142	2019/2020 (70%)				142	
188	TUR	Guzide Irmak Bayir	142	2021/2022 (100%)					
188	TUR	Guzide Irmak Bayir	142	2020/2021 (100%)					
188	TUR	Guzide Irmak Bayir	142	2019/2020 (70%)				142	
191	ITA	Anna Pezzetta	141	2021/2022 (100%)	141				
191	ITA	Anna Pezzetta	141	2020/2021 (100%)					
191	ITA	Anna Pezzetta	141	2019/2020 (70%)					
192	KOR	Siwoo Song	133	2021/2022 (100%)		133			
192	KOR	Siwoo Song	133	2020/2021 (100%)					
192	KOR	Siwoo Song	133	2019/2020 (70%)					
193	EST	Gerli Liinamae	127	2021/2022 (100%)					
193	EST	Gerli Liinamae	127	2020/2021 (100%)					
193	EST	Gerli Liinamae	127	2019/2020 (70%)				127	
193	ITA	Elettra Maria Olivotto	127	2021/2022 (100%)					
193	ITA	Elettra Maria Olivotto	127	2020/2021 (100%)					
193	ITA	Elettra Maria Olivotto	127	2019/2020 (70%)				127	
193	SGP	Chloe Ing	127	2021/2022 (100%)					
193	SGP	Chloe Ing	127	2020/2021 (100%)					
193	SGP	Chloe Ing	127	2019/2020 (70%)				127	
193	SWE	Cassandra Johansson	127	2021/2022 (100%)					
193	SWE	Cassandra Johansson	127	2020/2021 (100%)					
193	SWE	Cassandra Johansson	127	2019/2020 (70%)				127	
197	MEX	Eugenia Garza	126	2021/2022 (100%)	126				
197	MEX	Eugenia Garza	126	2020/2021 (100%)					
197	MEX	Eugenia Garza	126	2019/2020 (70%)					
198	CAN	Hannah Dawson	125	2021/2022 (100%)					
198	CAN	Hannah Dawson	125	2020/2021 (100%)					
198	CAN	Hannah Dawson	125	2019/2020 (70%)				125	
199	KOR	Chaebin Hwang	120	2021/2022 (100%)		120			
199	KOR	Chaebin Hwang	120	2020/2021 (100%)					
199	KOR	Chaebin Hwang	120	2019/2020 (70%)					
199	USA	Josephine Lee	120	2021/2022 (100%)		120			
199	USA	Josephine Lee	120	2020/2021 (100%)					
199	USA	Josephine Lee	120	2019/2020 (70%)					
199	USA	Maryn Pierce	120	2021/2022 (100%)		120			
199	USA	Maryn Pierce	120	2020/2021 (100%)					
199	USA	Maryn Pierce	120	2019/2020 (70%)					
202	BRA	Isadora Williams	115	2021/2022 (100%)					
202	BRA	Isadora Williams	115	2020/2021 (100%)					
202	BRA	Isadora Williams	115	2019/2020 (70%)				115	
202	GBR	Karly Robertson	115	2021/2022 (100%)					
202	GBR	Karly Robertson	115	2020/2021 (100%)					
202	GBR	Karly Robertson	115	2019/2020 (70%)				115	
202	ISR	Nelli Ioffe	115	2021/2022 (100%)					
202	ISR	Nelli Ioffe	115	2020/2021 (100%)					
202	ISR	Nelli Ioffe	115	2019/2020 (70%)				115	
202	NOR	Marianne Stalen	115	2021/2022 (100%)					
202	NOR	Marianne Stalen	115	2020/2021 (100%)					
202	NOR	Marianne Stalen	115	2019/2020 (70%)				115	
202	RUS	Anastasia Kolomiets	115	2021/2022 (100%)					
202	RUS	Anastasia Kolomiets	115	2020/2021 (100%)					
202	RUS	Anastasia Kolomiets	115	2019/2020 (70%)				115	
202	SUI	Anais Coraducci	115	2021/2022 (100%)					
202	SUI	Anais Coraducci	115	2020/2021 (100%)					
202	SUI	Anais Coraducci	115	2019/2020 (70%)				115	
208	HKG	Hiu Ching Kwong	112	2021/2022 (100%)					
208	HKG	Hiu Ching Kwong	112	2020/2021 (100%)					
208	HKG	Hiu Ching Kwong	112	2019/2020 (70%)				112	
208	RUS	Stanislava Konstantinova	112	2021/2022 (100%)					
208	RUS	Stanislava Konstantinova	112	2020/2021 (100%)					
208	RUS	Stanislava Konstantinova	112	2019/2020 (70%)				112	
210	TPE	Jenny Shyu	109	2021/2022 (100%)					
210	TPE	Jenny Shyu	109	2020/2021 (100%)					
210	TPE	Jenny Shyu	109	2019/2020 (70%)	109				
211	CAN	Catherine Carle	108	2021/2022 (100%)		108			
211	CAN	Catherine Carle	108	2020/2021 (100%)					
211	CAN	Catherine Carle	108	2019/2020 (70%)					
211	EST	Amalia Zelenjak	108	2021/2022 (100%)		108			
211	EST	Amalia Zelenjak	108	2020/2021 (100%)					
211	EST	Amalia Zelenjak	108	2019/2020 (70%)					
211	LAT	Nikola Fomchenkova	108	2021/2022 (100%)		108			
211	LAT	Nikola Fomchenkova	108	2020/2021 (100%)					
211	LAT	Nikola Fomchenkova	108	2019/2020 (70%)					
211	SUI	Anna La Porta	108	2021/2022 (100%)		108			
211	SUI	Anna La Porta	108	2020/2021 (100%)					
211	SUI	Anna La Porta	108	2019/2020 (70%)					
215	CAN	Michelle Long	101	2021/2022 (100%)					
215	CAN	Michelle Long	101	2020/2021 (100%)					
215	CAN	Michelle Long	101	2019/2020 (70%)				101	
215	CHN	Yixuan Zhang	101	2021/2022 (100%)					
215	CHN	Yixuan Zhang	101	2020/2021 (100%)					
215	CHN	Yixuan Zhang	101	2019/2020 (70%)				101	
215	SWE	Matilda Algotsson	101	2021/2022 (100%)					
215	SWE	Matilda Algotsson	101	2020/2021 (100%)					
215	SWE	Matilda Algotsson	101	2019/2020 (70%)				101	
218	PHI	Alisson Krystle Perticheto	98	2021/2022 (100%)					
218	PHI	Alisson Krystle Perticheto	98	2020/2021 (100%)					
218	PHI	Alisson Krystle Perticheto	98	2019/2020 (70%)	98				
219	CAN	Sara-Maude Dupuis	97	2021/2022 (100%)		97			
219	CAN	Sara-Maude Dupuis	97	2020/2021 (100%)					
219	CAN	Sara-Maude Dupuis	97	2019/2020 (70%)					
219	POL	Karolina Bialas	97	2021/2022 (100%)		97			
219	POL	Karolina Bialas	97	2020/2021 (100%)					
219	POL	Karolina Bialas	97	2019/2020 (70%)					
221	CZE	Barbora Vrankova	93	2021/2022 (100%)	93				
221	CZE	Barbora Vrankova	93	2020/2021 (100%)					
221	CZE	Barbora Vrankova	93	2019/2020 (70%)					
221	USA	Emilia Murdock	93	2021/2022 (100%)					
221	USA	Emilia Murdock	93	2020/2021 (100%)					
221	USA	Emilia Murdock	93	2019/2020 (70%)		93			
223	HKG	Cheuk Ka Kahlen Cheung	88	2021/2022 (100%)					
223	HKG	Cheuk Ka Kahlen Cheung	88	2020/2021 (100%)					
223	HKG	Cheuk Ka Kahlen Cheung	88	2019/2020 (70%)	88				
224	USA	Jessica Lin	84	2021/2022 (100%)					
224	USA	Jessica Lin	84	2020/2021 (100%)					
224	USA	Jessica Lin	84	2019/2020 (70%)		84			
225	TPE	Amy Lin	79	2021/2022 (100%)					
225	TPE	Amy Lin	79	2020/2021 (100%)					
225	TPE	Amy Lin	79	2019/2020 (70%)	79				
226	JPN	Moa Iwano	76	2021/2022 (100%)					
226	JPN	Moa Iwano	76	2020/2021 (100%)					
226	JPN	Moa Iwano	76	2019/2020 (70%)		76			
226	KOR	Jihun To	76	2021/2022 (100%)					
226	KOR	Jihun To	76	2020/2021 (100%)					
226	KOR	Jihun To	76	2019/2020 (70%)		76			
228	ISR	Mariia Seniuk	75	2021/2022 (100%)	75				
228	ISR	Mariia Seniuk	75	2020/2021 (100%)					
228	ISR	Mariia Seniuk	75	2019/2020 (70%)					
229	KAZ	Aiza Mambekova	71	2021/2022 (100%)					
229	KAZ	Aiza Mambekova	71	2020/2021 (100%)					
229	KAZ	Aiza Mambekova	71	2019/2020 (70%)	71				
230	CHN	Hengxin Jin	68	2021/2022 (100%)					
230	CHN	Hengxin Jin	68	2020/2021 (100%)					
230	CHN	Hengxin Jin	68	2019/2020 (70%)		68			
230	NED	Julia Van Dijk	68	2021/2022 (100%)	68				
230	NED	Julia Van Dijk	68	2020/2021 (100%)					
230	NED	Julia Van Dijk	68	2019/2020 (70%)					
230	USA	Sarah Jung	68	2021/2022 (100%)					
230	USA	Sarah Jung	68	2020/2021 (100%)					
230	USA	Sarah Jung	68	2019/2020 (70%)		68			
233	CAN	Justine Miclette	61	2021/2022 (100%)	61				
233	CAN	Justine Miclette	61	2020/2021 (100%)					
233	CAN	Justine Miclette	61	2019/2020 (70%)					
234	GER	Olesya Ray	49	2021/2022 (100%)	49				
234	GER	Olesya Ray	49	2020/2021 (100%)					
234	GER	Olesya Ray	49	2019/2020 (70%)					
235	LAT	Anete Lace	43	2021/2022 (100%)					
235	LAT	Anete Lace	43	2020/2021 (100%)					
235	LAT	Anete Lace	43	2019/2020 (70%)	43				

==== Pairs ====
As of May 28, 2022.

Rank	Nation	Skater	Points	Season	ISU Championships or Olympics	(Junior) Grand Prix and Final		Selected International Competition	
Rank	Nation	Skater	Points	Season	Best	Best	2nd Best	Best	2nd Best
1	RUS	Anastasia Mishina / Aleksandr Galliamov	4391	2021/2022 (100%)	972	400	400	300	
1	RUS	Anastasia Mishina / Aleksandr Galliamov	4391	2020/2021 (100%)	1200				
1	RUS	Anastasia Mishina / Aleksandr Galliamov	4391	2019/2020 (70%)		454	280	210	175
2	RUS	Evgenia Tarasova / Vladimir Morozov	3953	2021/2022 (100%)	1080	400	360	300	270
2	RUS	Evgenia Tarasova / Vladimir Morozov	3953	2020/2021 (100%)	875				
2	RUS	Evgenia Tarasova / Vladimir Morozov	3953	2019/2020 (70%)	(529)	252	227	189	
3	CHN	Wenjing Sui / Cong Han	3920	2021/2022 (100%)	1200	400	400		
3	CHN	Wenjing Sui / Cong Han	3920	2020/2021 (100%)	1080				
3	CHN	Wenjing Sui / Cong Han	3920	2019/2020 (70%)	(588)	560	280		
4	RUS	Aleksandra Boikova / Dmitrii Kozlovskii	3259	2021/2022 (100%)	875	400	324		
4	RUS	Aleksandra Boikova / Dmitrii Kozlovskii	3259	2020/2021 (100%)	972				
4	RUS	Aleksandra Boikova / Dmitrii Kozlovskii	3259	2019/2020 (70%)	(588)	408	280		
5	USA	Ashley Cain-Gribble / Timothy Leduc	3000	2021/2022 (100%)	574	324	292	243	243
5	USA	Ashley Cain-Gribble / Timothy Leduc	3000	2020/2021 (100%)	517				
5	USA	Ashley Cain-Gribble / Timothy Leduc	3000	2019/2020 (70%)		204	183	210	210
6	USA	Alexa Knierim / Brandon Frazier	2929	2021/2022 (100%)	1200	324	292	250	225
6	USA	Alexa Knierim / Brandon Frazier	2929	2020/2021 (100%)	638				
6	USA	Alexa Knierim / Brandon Frazier	2929	2019/2020 (70%)					
7	CHN	Cheng Peng / Yang Jin	2888	2021/2022 (100%)	787	360			
7	CHN	Cheng Peng / Yang Jin	2888	2020/2021 (100%)	787				
7	CHN	Cheng Peng / Yang Jin	2888	2019/2020 (70%)	(529)	504	280	170	
8	JPN	Riku Miura / Ryuichi Kihara	2712	2021/2022 (100%)	1080	360	324	300	
8	JPN	Riku Miura / Ryuichi Kihara	2712	2020/2021 (100%)	465				
8	JPN	Riku Miura / Ryuichi Kihara	2712	2019/2020 (70%)	(281)	183			
9	GER	Minerva Fabienne Hase / Nolan Seegert	2633	2021/2022 (100%)	787	262	213	300	
9	GER	Minerva Fabienne Hase / Nolan Seegert	2633	2020/2021 (100%)					
9	GER	Minerva Fabienne Hase / Nolan Seegert	2633	2019/2020 (70%)	386	227	149	170	139
10	CAN	Kirsten Moore-Towers / Michael Marinaro	2513	2021/2022 (100%)	(465)	262	236		
10	CAN	Kirsten Moore-Towers / Michael Marinaro	2513	2020/2021 (100%)	709				
10	CAN	Kirsten Moore-Towers / Michael Marinaro	2513	2019/2020 (70%)	476	368	252	210	
11	ITA	Rebecca Ghilardi / Filippo Ambrosini	2341	2021/2022 (100%)	551	262	262	203	182
11	ITA	Rebecca Ghilardi / Filippo Ambrosini	2341	2020/2021 (100%)	(222)				
11	ITA	Rebecca Ghilardi / Filippo Ambrosini	2341	2019/2020 (70%)	281	149	134	175	142
12	USA	Audrey Lu / Misha Mitrofanov	2328	2021/2022 (100%)	840	292	262	300	203
12	USA	Audrey Lu / Misha Mitrofanov	2328	2020/2021 (100%)					
12	USA	Audrey Lu / Misha Mitrofanov	2328	2019/2020 (70%)		134		158	139
13	ITA	Nicole Della Monica / Matteo Guarise	2253	2021/2022 (100%)	(339)	292	213	250	
13	ITA	Nicole Della Monica / Matteo Guarise	2253	2020/2021 (100%)	574				
13	ITA	Nicole Della Monica / Matteo Guarise	2253	2019/2020 (70%)	428	204	134	158	
14	CAN	Vanessa James / Eric Radford	2045	2021/2022 (100%)	972	292	292	270	219
14	CAN	Vanessa James / Eric Radford	2045	2020/2021 (100%)					
14	CAN	Vanessa James / Eric Radford	2045	2019/2020 (70%)					
15	AUT	Miriam Ziegler / Severin Kiefer	1962	2021/2022 (100%)	638	191			
15	AUT	Miriam Ziegler / Severin Kiefer	1962	2020/2021 (100%)	418				
15	AUT	Miriam Ziegler / Severin Kiefer	1962	2019/2020 (70%)	(347)	204	183	175	153
16	CAN	Evelyn Walsh / Trennt Michaud	1812	2021/2022 (100%)	709	236	191		
16	CAN	Evelyn Walsh / Trennt Michaud	1812	2020/2021 (100%)	377				
16	CAN	Evelyn Walsh / Trennt Michaud	1812	2019/2020 (70%)	(347)	165	134		
17	RUS	Daria Pavliuchenko / Denis Khodykin	1778	2021/2022 (100%)		360	360		
17	RUS	Daria Pavliuchenko / Denis Khodykin	1778	2020/2021 (100%)					
17	RUS	Daria Pavliuchenko / Denis Khodykin	1778	2019/2020 (70%)	476	330	252		
18	USA	Jessica Calalang / Brian Johnson	1764	2021/2022 (100%)		262		270	225
18	USA	Jessica Calalang / Brian Johnson	1764	2020/2021 (100%)					
18	USA	Jessica Calalang / Brian Johnson	1764	2019/2020 (70%)	428	204	165	210	
19	HUN	Ioulia Chtchetinina / Mark Magyar	1742	2021/2022 (100%)	496	236	236	203	
19	HUN	Ioulia Chtchetinina / Mark Magyar	1742	2020/2021 (100%)	305				
19	HUN	Ioulia Chtchetinina / Mark Magyar	1742	2019/2020 (70%)	(228)			139	127
20	RUS	Iuliia Artemeva / Mikhail Nazarychev	1565	2021/2022 (100%)		360	324	243	
20	RUS	Iuliia Artemeva / Mikhail Nazarychev	1565	2020/2021 (100%)					
20	RUS	Iuliia Artemeva / Mikhail Nazarychev	1565	2019/2020 (70%)	284	179	175		
21	GEO	Karina Safina / Luka Berulava	1546	2021/2022 (100%)	875	225	203	243	
21	GEO	Karina Safina / Luka Berulava	1546	2020/2021 (100%)					
21	GEO	Karina Safina / Luka Berulava	1546	2019/2020 (70%)					
22	RUS	Alina Pepeleva / Roman Pleshkov	1522	2021/2022 (100%)		236	236	219	164
22	RUS	Alina Pepeleva / Roman Pleshkov	1522	2020/2021 (100%)					
22	RUS	Alina Pepeleva / Roman Pleshkov	1522	2019/2020 (70%)		161	142	189	175
23	GER	Annika Hocke / Robert Kunkel	1315	2021/2022 (100%)	(237)			219	
23	GER	Annika Hocke / Robert Kunkel	1315	2020/2021 (100%)	339				
23	GER	Annika Hocke / Robert Kunkel	1315	2019/2020 (70%)	312	145	142	158	
24	GBR	Zoe Jones / Christopher Boyadji	1102	2021/2022 (100%)	465	191			
24	GBR	Zoe Jones / Christopher Boyadji	1102	2020/2021 (100%)					
24	GBR	Zoe Jones / Christopher Boyadji	1102	2019/2020 (70%)	185	134		127	
25	ITA	Sara Conti / Niccolo Macii	938	2021/2022 (100%)	446	213		164	
25	ITA	Sara Conti / Niccolo Macii	938	2020/2021 (100%)					
25	ITA	Sara Conti / Niccolo Macii	938	2019/2020 (70%)				115	
25	USA	Emily Chan / Spencer Akira Howe	938	2021/2022 (100%)	756			182	
25	USA	Emily Chan / Spencer Akira Howe	938	2020/2021 (100%)					
25	USA	Emily Chan / Spencer Akira Howe	938	2019/2020 (70%)					
27	USA	Anastasiia Smirnova / Danylo Siianytsia	924	2021/2022 (100%)	365	182	148		
27	USA	Anastasiia Smirnova / Danylo Siianytsia	924	2020/2021 (100%)					
27	USA	Anastasiia Smirnova / Danylo Siianytsia	924	2019/2020 (70%)	136	93			
28	ESP	Laura Barquero / Marco Zandron	913	2021/2022 (100%)	418			270	225
28	ESP	Laura Barquero / Marco Zandron	913	2020/2021 (100%)					
28	ESP	Laura Barquero / Marco Zandron	913	2019/2020 (70%)					
29	RUS	Kseniia Akhanteva / Valerii Kolesov	871	2021/2022 (100%)		182			
29	RUS	Kseniia Akhanteva / Valerii Kolesov	871	2020/2021 (100%)					
29	RUS	Kseniia Akhanteva / Valerii Kolesov	871	2019/2020 (70%)	315	199	175		
30	NED	Daria Danilova / Michel Tsiba	863	2021/2022 (100%)	517			225	
30	NED	Daria Danilova / Michel Tsiba	863	2020/2021 (100%)					
30	NED	Daria Danilova / Michel Tsiba	863	2019/2020 (70%)	121				
31	CAN	Deanna Stellato-Dudek / Maxime Deschamps	831	2021/2022 (100%)	612			219	
31	CAN	Deanna Stellato-Dudek / Maxime Deschamps	831	2020/2021 (100%)					
31	CAN	Deanna Stellato-Dudek / Maxime Deschamps	831	2019/2020 (70%)					
32	FRA	Camille Kovalev / Pavel Kovalev	787	2021/2022 (100%)	574	213			
32	FRA	Camille Kovalev / Pavel Kovalev	787	2020/2021 (100%)					
32	FRA	Camille Kovalev / Pavel Kovalev	787	2019/2020 (70%)					
33	AUS	Anastasia Golubeva / Hektor Giotopoulos Moore	778	2021/2022 (100%)	450	164	164		
33	AUS	Anastasia Golubeva / Hektor Giotopoulos Moore	778	2020/2021 (100%)					
33	AUS	Anastasia Golubeva / Hektor Giotopoulos Moore	778	2019/2020 (70%)					
34	RUS	Iasmina Kadyrova / Ivan Balchenko	770	2021/2022 (100%)		324		243	203
34	RUS	Iasmina Kadyrova / Ivan Balchenko	770	2020/2021 (100%)					
34	RUS	Iasmina Kadyrova / Ivan Balchenko	770	2019/2020 (70%)					
34	RUS	Apollinariia Panfilova / Dmitry Rylov	770	2021/2022 (100%)					
34	RUS	Apollinariia Panfilova / Dmitry Rylov	770	2020/2021 (100%)					
34	RUS	Apollinariia Panfilova / Dmitry Rylov	770	2019/2020 (70%)	350	245	175		
36	USA	Katie McBeath / Nathan Bartholomay	749	2021/2022 (100%)	551			198	
36	USA	Katie McBeath / Nathan Bartholomay	749	2020/2021 (100%)					
36	USA	Katie McBeath / Nathan Bartholomay	749	2019/2020 (70%)					
37	GEO	Anastasiia Metelkina / Daniil Parkman	742	2021/2022 (100%)				270	225
37	GEO	Anastasiia Metelkina / Daniil Parkman	742	2020/2021 (100%)	247				
37	GEO	Anastasiia Metelkina / Daniil Parkman	742	2019/2020 (70%)					
38	CAN	Lori-Ann Matte / Thierry Ferland	709	2021/2022 (100%)	496	213			
38	CAN	Lori-Ann Matte / Thierry Ferland	709	2020/2021 (100%)					
38	CAN	Lori-Ann Matte / Thierry Ferland	709	2019/2020 (70%)					
39	RUS	Anastasia Mukhortova / Dmitry Evgenyev	700	2021/2022 (100%)		250	225	225	
39	RUS	Anastasia Mukhortova / Dmitry Evgenyev	700	2020/2021 (100%)					
39	RUS	Anastasia Mukhortova / Dmitry Evgenyev	700	2019/2020 (70%)					
40	FRA	Cleo Hamon / Denys Strekalin	681	2021/2022 (100%)				182	
40	FRA	Cleo Hamon / Denys Strekalin	681	2020/2021 (100%)	162				
40	FRA	Cleo Hamon / Denys Strekalin	681	2019/2020 (70%)	253	84			
41	ESP	Dorota Broda / Pedro Betegon Martin	643	2021/2022 (100%)	418			225	
41	ESP	Dorota Broda / Pedro Betegon Martin	643	2020/2021 (100%)					
41	ESP	Dorota Broda / Pedro Betegon Martin	643	2019/2020 (70%)					
42	UKR	Violetta Sierova / Ivan Khobta	592	2021/2022 (100%)	295	164	133		
42	UKR	Violetta Sierova / Ivan Khobta	592	2020/2021 (100%)					
42	UKR	Violetta Sierova / Ivan Khobta	592	2019/2020 (70%)					
43	FRA	Coline Keriven / Noel-Antoine Pierre	578	2021/2022 (100%)		191		182	
43	FRA	Coline Keriven / Noel-Antoine Pierre	578	2020/2021 (100%)					
43	FRA	Coline Keriven / Noel-Antoine Pierre	578	2019/2020 (70%)	205				
44	ISR	Hailey Kops / Evgeni Krasnopolski	575	2021/2022 (100%)	377			198	
44	ISR	Hailey Kops / Evgeni Krasnopolski	575	2020/2021 (100%)					
44	ISR	Hailey Kops / Evgeni Krasnopolski	575	2019/2020 (70%)					
45	USA	Chelsea Liu / Danny O'Shea	559	2021/2022 (100%)		213		182	164
45	USA	Chelsea Liu / Danny O'Shea	559	2020/2021 (100%)					
45	USA	Chelsea Liu / Danny O'Shea	559	2019/2020 (70%)					
46	CZE	Jelizaveta Zukova / Martin Bidar	539	2021/2022 (100%)	264				
46	CZE	Jelizaveta Zukova / Martin Bidar	539	2020/2021 (100%)	275				
46	CZE	Jelizaveta Zukova / Martin Bidar	539	2019/2020 (70%)					
47	BLR	Bogdana Lukashevich / Alexander Stepanov	525	2021/2022 (100%)	325				
47	BLR	Bogdana Lukashevich / Alexander Stepanov	525	2020/2021 (100%)	200				
47	BLR	Bogdana Lukashevich / Alexander Stepanov	525	2019/2020 (70%)					
48	RUS	Karina Akapova / Nikita Rakhmanin	500	2021/2022 (100%)				250	250
48	RUS	Karina Akapova / Nikita Rakhmanin	500	2020/2021 (100%)					
48	RUS	Karina Akapova / Nikita Rakhmanin	500	2019/2020 (70%)					
48	RUS	Ekaterina Chikmareva / Matvei Ianchenkov	500	2021/2022 (100%)		250	250		
48	RUS	Ekaterina Chikmareva / Matvei Ianchenkov	500	2020/2021 (100%)					
48	RUS	Ekaterina Chikmareva / Matvei Ianchenkov	500	2019/2020 (70%)					
50	CZE	Barbora Kucianova / Lukas Vochozka	481	2021/2022 (100%)	215	133	133		
50	CZE	Barbora Kucianova / Lukas Vochozka	481	2020/2021 (100%)					
50	CZE	Barbora Kucianova / Lukas Vochozka	481	2019/2020 (70%)					
51	RUS	Natalia Khabibullina / Ilya Knyazhuk	475	2021/2022 (100%)		250	225		
51	RUS	Natalia Khabibullina / Ilya Knyazhuk	475	2020/2021 (100%)					
51	RUS	Natalia Khabibullina / Ilya Knyazhuk	475	2019/2020 (70%)					
52	HUN	Maria Pavlova / Balazs Nagy	457	2021/2022 (100%)	293			164	
52	HUN	Maria Pavlova / Balazs Nagy	457	2020/2021 (100%)					
52	HUN	Maria Pavlova / Balazs Nagy	457	2019/2020 (70%)					
53	GER	Letizia Roscher / Luis Schuster	436	2021/2022 (100%)	328	108			
53	GER	Letizia Roscher / Luis Schuster	436	2020/2021 (100%)					
53	GER	Letizia Roscher / Luis Schuster	436	2019/2020 (70%)					
54	ITA	Anna Valesi / Manuel Piazza	428	2021/2022 (100%)				225	203
54	ITA	Anna Valesi / Manuel Piazza	428	2020/2021 (100%)					
54	ITA	Anna Valesi / Manuel Piazza	428	2019/2020 (70%)					
54	RUS	Ekaterina Petushkova / Evgenii Malikov	428	2021/2022 (100%)		225	203		
54	RUS	Ekaterina Petushkova / Evgenii Malikov	428	2020/2021 (100%)					
54	RUS	Ekaterina Petushkova / Evgenii Malikov	428	2019/2020 (70%)					
56	CAN	Chloe Panetta / Kieran Thrasher	414	2021/2022 (100%)	266	148			
56	CAN	Chloe Panetta / Kieran Thrasher	414	2020/2021 (100%)					
56	CAN	Chloe Panetta / Kieran Thrasher	414	2019/2020 (70%)					
57	NED	Nika Osipova / Dmitry Epstein	406	2021/2022 (100%)				203	203
57	NED	Nika Osipova / Dmitry Epstein	406	2020/2021 (100%)					
57	NED	Nika Osipova / Dmitry Epstein	406	2019/2020 (70%)					
57	RUS	Polina Kostiukovich / Aleksei Briukhanov	406	2021/2022 (100%)		203	203		
57	RUS	Polina Kostiukovich / Aleksei Briukhanov	406	2020/2021 (100%)					
57	RUS	Polina Kostiukovich / Aleksei Briukhanov	406	2019/2020 (70%)					
59	CAN	Brooke Mcintosh / Benjamin Mimar	405	2021/2022 (100%)	405				
59	CAN	Brooke Mcintosh / Benjamin Mimar	405	2020/2021 (100%)					
59	CAN	Brooke Mcintosh / Benjamin Mimar	405	2019/2020 (70%)					
60	CHN	Huidi Wang / Ziqi Jia	393	2021/2022 (100%)					
60	CHN	Huidi Wang / Ziqi Jia	393	2020/2021 (100%)					
60	CHN	Huidi Wang / Ziqi Jia	393	2019/2020 (70%)	151	127	115		
61	RUS	Ekaterina Storublevtceva / Artem Gritsaenko	364	2021/2022 (100%)		182	182		
61	RUS	Ekaterina Storublevtceva / Artem Gritsaenko	364	2020/2021 (100%)					
61	RUS	Ekaterina Storublevtceva / Artem Gritsaenko	364	2019/2020 (70%)					
62	ITA	Alyssa Montan / Filippo Clerici	359	2021/2022 (100%)	239	120			
62	ITA	Alyssa Montan / Filippo Clerici	359	2020/2021 (100%)					
62	ITA	Alyssa Montan / Filippo Clerici	359	2019/2020 (70%)					
63	UKR	Sofiia Holichenko / Artem Darenskyi	356	2021/2022 (100%)	192			164	
63	UKR	Sofiia Holichenko / Artem Darenskyi	356	2020/2021 (100%)					
63	UKR	Sofiia Holichenko / Artem Darenskyi	356	2019/2020 (70%)					
64	PRK	Tae Ok Ryom / Ju Sik Kim	353	2021/2022 (100%)					
64	PRK	Tae Ok Ryom / Ju Sik Kim	353	2020/2021 (100%)					
64	PRK	Tae Ok Ryom / Ju Sik Kim	353	2019/2020 (70%)		183		170	
65	USA	Isabelle Martins / Ryan Bedard	352	2021/2022 (100%)		164	120		
65	USA	Isabelle Martins / Ryan Bedard	352	2020/2021 (100%)					
65	USA	Isabelle Martins / Ryan Bedard	352	2019/2020 (70%)		68			
66	CHN	Yuchen Wang / Yihang Huang	319	2021/2022 (100%)					
66	CHN	Yuchen Wang / Yihang Huang	319	2020/2021 (100%)					
66	CHN	Yuchen Wang / Yihang Huang	319	2019/2020 (70%)	167	76	76		
67	CRO	Lana Petranovic / Antonio Souza Kordeiru	307	2021/2022 (100%)	173				
67	CRO	Lana Petranovic / Antonio Souza Kordeiru	307	2020/2021 (100%)					
67	CRO	Lana Petranovic / Antonio Souza Kordeiru	307	2019/2020 (70%)	134				
68	FRA	Oxana Vouillamoz / Flavien Giniaux	291	2021/2022 (100%)	194	97			
68	FRA	Oxana Vouillamoz / Flavien Giniaux	291	2020/2021 (100%)					
68	FRA	Oxana Vouillamoz / Flavien Giniaux	291	2019/2020 (70%)					
69	GBR	Anastasia Vaipan-Law / Luke Digby	250	2021/2022 (100%)				250	
69	GBR	Anastasia Vaipan-Law / Luke Digby	250	2020/2021 (100%)					
69	GBR	Anastasia Vaipan-Law / Luke Digby	250	2019/2020 (70%)					
69	ITA	Irma Caldara / Riccardo Maglio	250	2021/2022 (100%)				250	
69	ITA	Irma Caldara / Riccardo Maglio	250	2020/2021 (100%)					
69	ITA	Irma Caldara / Riccardo Maglio	250	2019/2020 (70%)					
71	CAN	Kelly Ann Laurin / Loucas Ethier	193	2021/2022 (100%)					
71	CAN	Kelly Ann Laurin / Loucas Ethier	193	2020/2021 (100%)					
71	CAN	Kelly Ann Laurin / Loucas Ethier	193	2019/2020 (70%)	89	104			
72	FIN	Milania Vaananen / Mikhail Akulov	182	2021/2022 (100%)				182	
72	FIN	Milania Vaananen / Mikhail Akulov	182	2020/2021 (100%)					
72	FIN	Milania Vaananen / Mikhail Akulov	182	2019/2020 (70%)					
73	FRA	Oceane Piegad / Remi Belmonte	164	2021/2022 (100%)				164	
73	FRA	Oceane Piegad / Remi Belmonte	164	2020/2021 (100%)					
73	FRA	Oceane Piegad / Remi Belmonte	164	2019/2020 (70%)					
73	GBR	Lydia Smart / Harry Mattick	164	2021/2022 (100%)				164	
73	GBR	Lydia Smart / Harry Mattick	164	2020/2021 (100%)					
73	GBR	Lydia Smart / Harry Mattick	164	2019/2020 (70%)					
75	CAN	Meghan Fredette / William St-Louis	148	2021/2022 (100%)		148			
75	CAN	Meghan Fredette / William St-Louis	148	2020/2021 (100%)					
75	CAN	Meghan Fredette / William St-Louis	148	2019/2020 (70%)					
75	UZB	Anastasiya Sazonova / Jamshid Tashmukhamedov	148	2021/2022 (100%)		148			
75	UZB	Anastasiya Sazonova / Jamshid Tashmukhamedov	148	2020/2021 (100%)					
75	UZB	Anastasiya Sazonova / Jamshid Tashmukhamedov	148	2019/2020 (70%)					
77	USA	Olivia Serafini / Mervin Tran	139	2021/2022 (100%)					
77	USA	Olivia Serafini / Mervin Tran	139	2020/2021 (100%)					
77	USA	Olivia Serafini / Mervin Tran	139	2019/2020 (70%)				139	
78	PRK	Hyang Mi Ro / Kum Chol Han	115	2021/2022 (100%)					
78	PRK	Hyang Mi Ro / Kum Chol Han	115	2020/2021 (100%)					
78	PRK	Hyang Mi Ro / Kum Chol Han	115	2019/2020 (70%)		115			
79	SVK	Margareta Muskova / Oliver Kubacak	108	2021/2022 (100%)		108			
79	SVK	Margareta Muskova / Oliver Kubacak	108	2020/2021 (100%)					
79	SVK	Margareta Muskova / Oliver Kubacak	108	2019/2020 (70%)					
80	USA	Cate Fleming / Chase Finster	97	2021/2022 (100%)		97			
80	USA	Cate Fleming / Chase Finster	97	2020/2021 (100%)					
80	USA	Cate Fleming / Chase Finster	97	2019/2020 (70%)					
81	SWE	Greta Crafoord / John Crafoord	80	2021/2022 (100%)					
81	SWE	Greta Crafoord / John Crafoord	80	2020/2021 (100%)					
81	SWE	Greta Crafoord / John Crafoord	80	2019/2020 (70%)	80				
82	CHN	Motong Liu / Tianze Wang	76	2021/2022 (100%)					
82	CHN	Motong Liu / Tianze Wang	76	2020/2021 (100%)					
82	CHN	Motong Liu / Tianze Wang	76	2019/2020 (70%)		76			

==== Ice Dance ====
As of May 28, 2022.

Rank	Nation	Skater	Points	Season	ISU Championships or Olympics	(Junior) Grand Prix and Final		Selected International Competition	
Rank	Nation	Skater	Points	Season	Best	Best	2nd Best	Best	2nd Best
1	USA	Madison Chock / Evan Bates	4013	2021/2022 (100%)	972	360	360	270	
1	USA	Madison Chock / Evan Bates	4013	2020/2021 (100%)	875				
1	USA	Madison Chock / Evan Bates	4013	2019/2020 (70%)	(588)	504	252	210	210
2	USA	Madison Hubbell / Zachary Donohue	3904	2021/2022 (100%)	1080	400	360	250	
2	USA	Madison Hubbell / Zachary Donohue	3904	2020/2021 (100%)	1080				
2	USA	Madison Hubbell / Zachary Donohue	3904	2019/2020 (70%)	(476)	454	280		
3	RUS	Victoria Sinitsina / Nikita Katsalapov	3900	2021/2022 (100%)	1080	400	400		
3	RUS	Victoria Sinitsina / Nikita Katsalapov	3900	2020/2021 (100%)	1200				
3	RUS	Victoria Sinitsina / Nikita Katsalapov	3900	2019/2020 (70%)	(588)	330	280	210	
4	ITA	Charlene Guignard / Marco Fabbri	3778	2021/2022 (100%)	875	360	360	300	300
4	ITA	Charlene Guignard / Marco Fabbri	3778	2020/2021 (100%)	709				
4	ITA	Charlene Guignard / Marco Fabbri	3778	2019/2020 (70%)	(428)	227	227	210	210
5	CAN	Piper Gilles / Paul Poirier	3677	2021/2022 (100%)	787	400	360	300	
5	CAN	Piper Gilles / Paul Poirier	3677	2020/2021 (100%)	972				
5	CAN	Piper Gilles / Paul Poirier	3677	2019/2020 (70%)	(529)	368	280	210	
6	FRA	Gabriella Papadakis / Guillaume Cizeron	3669	2021/2022 (100%)	1200	400	400	300	
6	FRA	Gabriella Papadakis / Guillaume Cizeron	3669	2020/2021 (100%)					
6	FRA	Gabriella Papadakis / Guillaume Cizeron	3669	2019/2020 (70%)	529	560	280		
7	GBR	Lilah Fear / Lewis Gibson	3150	2021/2022 (100%)	709	324	213	250	243
7	GBR	Lilah Fear / Lewis Gibson	3150	2020/2021 (100%)	638				
7	GBR	Lilah Fear / Lewis Gibson	3150	2019/2020 (70%)	(386)	227	204	189	153
8	CAN	Laurence Fournier Beaudry / Nikolaj Soerensen	3132	2021/2022 (100%)	517	324	324	270	270
8	CAN	Laurence Fournier Beaudry / Nikolaj Soerensen	3132	2020/2021 (100%)	574				
8	CAN	Laurence Fournier Beaudry / Nikolaj Soerensen	3132	2019/2020 (70%)		227	227	210	189
9	RUS	Alexandra Stepanova / Ivan Bukin	2851	2021/2022 (100%)	756	324	324		
9	RUS	Alexandra Stepanova / Ivan Bukin	2851	2020/2021 (100%)	787				
9	RUS	Alexandra Stepanova / Ivan Bukin	2851	2019/2020 (70%)	(476)	408	252		
10	ESP	Olivia Smart / Adrian Diaz	2784	2021/2022 (100%)	638	324	292	270	243
10	ESP	Olivia Smart / Adrian Diaz	2784	2020/2021 (100%)					
10	ESP	Olivia Smart / Adrian Diaz	2784	2019/2020 (70%)	281	204	204	175	153
11	ESP	Sara Hurtado / Kirill Khaliavin	2748	2021/2022 (100%)	496	292	292	243	198
11	ESP	Sara Hurtado / Kirill Khaliavin	2748	2020/2021 (100%)	418				
11	ESP	Sara Hurtado / Kirill Khaliavin	2748	2019/2020 (70%)	(312)	227	183	210	189
12	USA	Caroline Green / Michael Parsons	2525	2021/2022 (100%)	840	292	262	250	243
12	USA	Caroline Green / Michael Parsons	2525	2020/2021 (100%)					
12	USA	Caroline Green / Michael Parsons	2525	2019/2020 (70%)		149	149	170	170
13	USA	Kaitlin Hawayek / Jean-Luc Baker	2229	2021/2022 (100%)	574	262		300	
13	USA	Kaitlin Hawayek / Jean-Luc Baker	2229	2020/2021 (100%)	517				
13	USA	Kaitlin Hawayek / Jean-Luc Baker	2229	2019/2020 (70%)	(347)	204	183	189	
14	CAN	Carolane Soucisse / Shane Firus	2140	2021/2022 (100%)	612	213	213	198	
14	CAN	Carolane Soucisse / Shane Firus	2140	2020/2021 (100%)					
14	CAN	Carolane Soucisse / Shane Firus	2140	2019/2020 (70%)	312	149	134	170	139
15	LTU	Allison Reed / Saulius Ambrulevicius	2136	2021/2022 (100%)	465	213	191	270	225
15	LTU	Allison Reed / Saulius Ambrulevicius	2136	2020/2021 (100%)	275				
15	LTU	Allison Reed / Saulius Ambrulevicius	2136	2019/2020 (70%)	(205)	183		175	139
16	USA	Christina Carreira / Anthony Ponomarenko	2081	2021/2022 (100%)	680	262	191	219	
16	USA	Christina Carreira / Anthony Ponomarenko	2081	2020/2021 (100%)					
16	USA	Christina Carreira / Anthony Ponomarenko	2081	2019/2020 (70%)		165	165	210	189
17	CAN	Marjorie Lajoie / Zachary Lagha	1988	2021/2022 (100%)	418	262	236	219	
17	CAN	Marjorie Lajoie / Zachary Lagha	1988	2020/2021 (100%)	(305)				
17	CAN	Marjorie Lajoie / Zachary Lagha	1988	2019/2020 (70%)	386	165	149	153	
18	CHN	Shiyue Wang / Xinyu Liu	1831	2021/2022 (100%)	377	292			
18	CHN	Shiyue Wang / Xinyu Liu	1831	2020/2021 (100%)	(339)				
18	CHN	Shiyue Wang / Xinyu Liu	1831	2019/2020 (70%)	428	204	183	189	158
18	GEO	Maria Kazakova / Georgy Reviya	1831	2021/2022 (100%)	275			250	243
18	GEO	Maria Kazakova / Georgy Reviya	1831	2020/2021 (100%)					
18	GEO	Maria Kazakova / Georgy Reviya	1831	2019/2020 (70%)	315	245	175	170	158
20	RUS	Diana Davis / Gleb Smolkin	1779	2021/2022 (100%)	446	262		300	225
20	RUS	Diana Davis / Gleb Smolkin	1779	2020/2021 (100%)					
20	RUS	Diana Davis / Gleb Smolkin	1779	2019/2020 (70%)	230	158	158		
21	FRA	Evgeniia Lopareva / Geoffrey Brissaud	1615	2021/2022 (100%)	362	292	236	225	
21	FRA	Evgeniia Lopareva / Geoffrey Brissaud	1615	2020/2021 (100%)	222				
21	FRA	Evgeniia Lopareva / Geoffrey Brissaud	1615	2019/2020 (70%)	(134)			153	125
22	UKR	Oleksandra Nazarova / Maksym Nikitin	1609	2021/2022 (100%)	325	191		270	250
22	UKR	Oleksandra Nazarova / Maksym Nikitin	1609	2020/2021 (100%)	(162)				
22	UKR	Oleksandra Nazarova / Maksym Nikitin	1609	2019/2020 (70%)	228			175	170
23	POL	Natalia Kaliszek / Maksym Spodyriev	1554	2021/2022 (100%)	(222)	191			
23	POL	Natalia Kaliszek / Maksym Spodyriev	1554	2020/2021 (100%)	377				
23	POL	Natalia Kaliszek / Maksym Spodyriev	1554	2019/2020 (70%)	253	204	165	189	175
24	GER	Katharina Mueller / Tim Dieck	1452	2021/2022 (100%)	264	191		270	225
24	GER	Katharina Mueller / Tim Dieck	1452	2020/2021 (100%)	200				
24	GER	Katharina Mueller / Tim Dieck	1452	2019/2020 (70%)	(166)			175	127
25	USA	Oona Brown / Gage Brown	1319	2021/2022 (100%)	500	250	225		
25	USA	Oona Brown / Gage Brown	1319	2020/2021 (100%)					
25	USA	Oona Brown / Gage Brown	1319	2019/2020 (70%)	136	115	93		
26	FIN	Juulia Turkkila / Matthias Versluis	1315	2021/2022 (100%)	377	213		300	250
26	FIN	Juulia Turkkila / Matthias Versluis	1315	2020/2021 (100%)					
26	FIN	Juulia Turkkila / Matthias Versluis	1315	2019/2020 (70%)				175	
27	CAN	Natalie D'Alessandro / Bruce Waddell	1310	2021/2022 (100%)	450	250	203		
27	CAN	Natalie D'Alessandro / Bruce Waddell	1310	2020/2021 (100%)					
27	CAN	Natalie D'Alessandro / Bruce Waddell	1310	2019/2020 (70%)	122	158	127		
28	RUS	Anastasia Skoptcova / Kirill Aleshin	1268	2021/2022 (100%)		236		300	250
28	RUS	Anastasia Skoptcova / Kirill Aleshin	1268	2020/2021 (100%)					
28	RUS	Anastasia Skoptcova / Kirill Aleshin	1268	2019/2020 (70%)		149		175	158
28	USA	Katarina Wolfkostin / Jeffrey Chen	1268	2021/2022 (100%)	365	250	225		
28	USA	Katarina Wolfkostin / Jeffrey Chen	1268	2020/2021 (100%)					
28	USA	Katarina Wolfkostin / Jeffrey Chen	1268	2019/2020 (70%)	186	127	115		
30	JPN	Kana Muramoto / Daisuke Takahashi	1262	2021/2022 (100%)	756	236		270	
30	JPN	Kana Muramoto / Daisuke Takahashi	1262	2020/2021 (100%)					
30	JPN	Kana Muramoto / Daisuke Takahashi	1262	2019/2020 (70%)					
31	CZE	Natalie Taschlerova / Filip Taschler	1238	2021/2022 (100%)	339			198	198
31	CZE	Natalie Taschlerova / Filip Taschler	1238	2020/2021 (100%)					
31	CZE	Natalie Taschlerova / Filip Taschler	1238	2019/2020 (70%)	88	142	115	158	
32	ARM	Tina Garabedian / Simon Proulx Senecal	1189	2021/2022 (100%)	305			250	225
32	ARM	Tina Garabedian / Simon Proulx Senecal	1189	2020/2021 (100%)					
32	ARM	Tina Garabedian / Simon Proulx Senecal	1189	2019/2020 (70%)	109			158	142
33	RUS	Tiffani Zagorski / Jonathan Guerreiro	1178	2021/2022 (100%)					
33	RUS	Tiffani Zagorski / Jonathan Guerreiro	1178	2020/2021 (100%)	465				
33	RUS	Tiffani Zagorski / Jonathan Guerreiro	1178	2019/2020 (70%)	347	183	183		
34	CAN	Marie-Jade Lauriault / Romain Le Gac	1144	2021/2022 (100%)	496				
34	CAN	Marie-Jade Lauriault / Romain Le Gac	1144	2020/2021 (100%)					
34	CAN	Marie-Jade Lauriault / Romain Le Gac	1144	2019/2020 (70%)		134	134	210	170
35	RUS	Elizaveta Shanaeva / Devid Naryzhnyy	1120	2021/2022 (100%)				243	219
35	RUS	Elizaveta Shanaeva / Devid Naryzhnyy	1120	2020/2021 (100%)					
35	RUS	Elizaveta Shanaeva / Devid Naryzhnyy	1120	2019/2020 (70%)	284	199	175		
36	FRA	Loicia Demougeot / Theo Le Mercier	1105	2021/2022 (100%)	173			203	203
36	FRA	Loicia Demougeot / Theo Le Mercier	1105	2020/2021 (100%)					
36	FRA	Loicia Demougeot / Theo Le Mercier	1105	2019/2020 (70%)	207	161	158		
37	CAN	Nadiia Bashynska / Peter Beaumont	1059	2021/2022 (100%)	405	203	182		
37	CAN	Nadiia Bashynska / Peter Beaumont	1059	2020/2021 (100%)					
37	CAN	Nadiia Bashynska / Peter Beaumont	1059	2019/2020 (70%)		142	127		
38	AUS	Holly Harris / Jason Chan	1040	2021/2022 (100%)	402			203	182
38	AUS	Holly Harris / Jason Chan	1040	2020/2021 (100%)					
38	AUS	Holly Harris / Jason Chan	1040	2019/2020 (70%)	253				
39	FRA	Adelina Galyavieva / Louis Thauron	866	2021/2022 (100%)					
39	FRA	Adelina Galyavieva / Louis Thauron	866	2020/2021 (100%)	247				
39	FRA	Adelina Galyavieva / Louis Thauron	866	2019/2020 (70%)	185	134		158	142
40	FIN	Yuka Orihara / Juho Pirinen	857	2021/2022 (100%)				250	225
40	FIN	Yuka Orihara / Juho Pirinen	857	2020/2021 (100%)					
40	FIN	Yuka Orihara / Juho Pirinen	857	2019/2020 (70%)	98			142	142
41	RUS	Annabelle Morozov / Andrei Bagin	840	2021/2022 (100%)		262	236		
41	RUS	Annabelle Morozov / Andrei Bagin	840	2020/2021 (100%)					
41	RUS	Annabelle Morozov / Andrei Bagin	840	2019/2020 (70%)				189	153
42	JPN	Misato Komatsubara / Tim Koleto	834	2021/2022 (100%)		236	213		
42	JPN	Misato Komatsubara / Tim Koleto	834	2020/2021 (100%)	180				
42	JPN	Misato Komatsubara / Tim Koleto	834	2019/2020 (70%)	205				
43	GER	Jennifer Janse Van Rensburg / Benjamin Steffan	792	2021/2022 (100%)				250	250
43	GER	Jennifer Janse Van Rensburg / Benjamin Steffan	792	2020/2021 (100%)					
43	GER	Jennifer Janse Van Rensburg / Benjamin Steffan	792	2019/2020 (70%)				153	139
44	GBR	Sasha Fear / George Waddell	779	2021/2022 (100%)	222			225	164
44	GBR	Sasha Fear / George Waddell	779	2020/2021 (100%)					
44	GBR	Sasha Fear / George Waddell	779	2019/2020 (70%)		84	84		
45	CAN	Haley Sales / Nikolas Wamsteeker	766	2021/2022 (100%)	446			178	
45	CAN	Haley Sales / Nikolas Wamsteeker	766	2020/2021 (100%)					
45	CAN	Haley Sales / Nikolas Wamsteeker	766	2019/2020 (70%)				142	
46	RUS	Sofya Tyutyunina / Alexander Shustitskiy	753	2021/2022 (100%)		250	203		
46	RUS	Sofya Tyutyunina / Alexander Shustitskiy	753	2020/2021 (100%)					
46	RUS	Sofya Tyutyunina / Alexander Shustitskiy	753	2019/2020 (70%)		158	142		
47	USA	Emily Bratti / Ian Somerville	749	2021/2022 (100%)	551			198	
47	USA	Emily Bratti / Ian Somerville	749	2020/2021 (100%)					
47	USA	Emily Bratti / Ian Somerville	749	2019/2020 (70%)					
48	KOR	Yura Min / Daniel Eaton	717	2021/2022 (100%)				182	
48	KOR	Yura Min / Daniel Eaton	717	2020/2021 (100%)					
48	KOR	Yura Min / Daniel Eaton	717	2019/2020 (70%)	281			127	127
49	CYP	Angelina Kudryavtseva / Ilia Karankevich	691	2021/2022 (100%)	239	203	133		
49	CYP	Angelina Kudryavtseva / Ilia Karankevich	691	2020/2021 (100%)					
49	CYP	Angelina Kudryavtseva / Ilia Karankevich	691	2019/2020 (70%)	48	68			
50	AUS	Chantelle Kerry / Andrew Dodds	684	2021/2022 (100%)				225	182
50	AUS	Chantelle Kerry / Andrew Dodds	684	2020/2021 (100%)					
50	AUS	Chantelle Kerry / Andrew Dodds	684	2019/2020 (70%)	150			127	
51	FRA	Lou Terreaux / Noe Perron	649	2021/2022 (100%)				203	178
51	FRA	Lou Terreaux / Noe Perron	649	2020/2021 (100%)					
51	FRA	Lou Terreaux / Noe Perron	649	2019/2020 (70%)	80	104	84		
52	CAN	Miku Makita / Tyler Gunara	646	2021/2022 (100%)		225			
52	CAN	Miku Makita / Tyler Gunara	646	2020/2021 (100%)					
52	CAN	Miku Makita / Tyler Gunara	646	2019/2020 (70%)	167	127	127		
52	KOR	Hannah Lim / Ye Quan	646	2021/2022 (100%)	295	203	148		
52	KOR	Hannah Lim / Ye Quan	646	2020/2021 (100%)					
52	KOR	Hannah Lim / Ye Quan	646	2019/2020 (70%)					
54	UKR	Mariia Holubtsova / Kyryl Bielobrov	635	2021/2022 (100%)	156			182	
54	UKR	Mariia Holubtsova / Kyryl Bielobrov	635	2020/2021 (100%)					
54	UKR	Mariia Holubtsova / Kyryl Bielobrov	635	2019/2020 (70%)	89	115	93		
55	USA	Angela Ling / Caleb Wein	633	2021/2022 (100%)	266	203	164		
55	USA	Angela Ling / Caleb Wein	633	2020/2021 (100%)					
55	USA	Angela Ling / Caleb Wein	633	2019/2020 (70%)					
56	GER	Darya Grimm / Michail Savitskiy	624	2021/2022 (100%)	328	148	148		
56	GER	Darya Grimm / Michail Savitskiy	624	2020/2021 (100%)					
56	GER	Darya Grimm / Michail Savitskiy	624	2019/2020 (70%)					
57	FRA	Natacha Lagouge / Arnaud Caffa	617	2021/2022 (100%)				250	225
57	FRA	Natacha Lagouge / Arnaud Caffa	617	2020/2021 (100%)					
57	FRA	Natacha Lagouge / Arnaud Caffa	617	2019/2020 (70%)				142	
58	FRA	Marie Dupayage / Thomas Nabais	609	2021/2022 (100%)				225	198
58	FRA	Marie Dupayage / Thomas Nabais	609	2020/2021 (100%)					
58	FRA	Marie Dupayage / Thomas Nabais	609	2019/2020 (70%)		93	93		
59	USA	Molly Cesanek / Yehor Yehorov	589	2021/2022 (100%)				203	178
59	USA	Molly Cesanek / Yehor Yehorov	589	2020/2021 (100%)					
59	USA	Molly Cesanek / Yehor Yehorov	589	2019/2020 (70%)		104	104		
60	FRA	Celina Fradji / Jean-Hans Fourneaux	580	2021/2022 (100%)	215	164	133		
60	FRA	Celina Fradji / Jean-Hans Fourneaux	580	2020/2021 (100%)					
60	FRA	Celina Fradji / Jean-Hans Fourneaux	580	2019/2020 (70%)		68			
61	HUN	Mariia Ignateva / Danijil Leonyidovics Szemko	568	2021/2022 (100%)	140			225	203
61	HUN	Mariia Ignateva / Danijil Leonyidovics Szemko	568	2020/2021 (100%)					
61	HUN	Mariia Ignateva / Danijil Leonyidovics Szemko	568	2019/2020 (70%)					
62	NZL	Charlotte Lafond-Fournier / Richard Kang In Kam	544	2021/2022 (100%)	362			182	
62	NZL	Charlotte Lafond-Fournier / Richard Kang In Kam	544	2020/2021 (100%)					
62	NZL	Charlotte Lafond-Fournier / Richard Kang In Kam	544	2019/2020 (70%)					
63	FRA	Eva Bernard / Tom Jochum	538	2021/2022 (100%)	174	182	182		
63	FRA	Eva Bernard / Tom Jochum	538	2020/2021 (100%)					
63	FRA	Eva Bernard / Tom Jochum	538	2019/2020 (70%)					
64	SUI	Jasmine Tessari / Stephane Walker	511	2021/2022 (100%)	126			203	182
64	SUI	Jasmine Tessari / Stephane Walker	511	2020/2021 (100%)					
64	SUI	Jasmine Tessari / Stephane Walker	511	2019/2020 (70%)					
65	RUS	Irina Khavronina / Dario Cirisano	500	2021/2022 (100%)		250	250		
65	RUS	Irina Khavronina / Dario Cirisano	500	2020/2021 (100%)					
65	RUS	Irina Khavronina / Dario Cirisano	500	2019/2020 (70%)					
66	EST	Solene Mazingue / Marko Jevgeni Gaidajenko	491	2021/2022 (100%)	180	203	108		
66	EST	Solene Mazingue / Marko Jevgeni Gaidajenko	491	2020/2021 (100%)					
66	EST	Solene Mazingue / Marko Jevgeni Gaidajenko	491	2019/2020 (70%)					
67	AUS	India Nette / Eron Westwood	489	2021/2022 (100%)	325			164	
67	AUS	India Nette / Eron Westwood	489	2020/2021 (100%)					
67	AUS	India Nette / Eron Westwood	489	2019/2020 (70%)					
68	RUS	Vasilisa Kaganovskaia / Valeriy Angelopol	475	2021/2022 (100%)		250	225		
68	RUS	Vasilisa Kaganovskaia / Valeriy Angelopol	475	2020/2021 (100%)					
68	RUS	Vasilisa Kaganovskaia / Valeriy Angelopol	475	2019/2020 (70%)					
69	BLR	Viktoria Semenjuk / Ilya Yukhimuk	469	2021/2022 (100%)				250	219
69	BLR	Viktoria Semenjuk / Ilya Yukhimuk	469	2020/2021 (100%)					
69	BLR	Viktoria Semenjuk / Ilya Yukhimuk	469	2019/2020 (70%)					
70	USA	Isabella Flores / Dimitry Tsarevski	450	2021/2022 (100%)		225	225		
70	USA	Isabella Flores / Dimitry Tsarevski	450	2020/2021 (100%)					
70	USA	Isabella Flores / Dimitry Tsarevski	450	2019/2020 (70%)					
71	RUS	Elizaveta Khudaiberdieva / Egor Bazin	434	2021/2022 (100%)		191		243	
71	RUS	Elizaveta Khudaiberdieva / Egor Bazin	434	2020/2021 (100%)					
71	RUS	Elizaveta Khudaiberdieva / Egor Bazin	434	2019/2020 (70%)					
72	ITA	Carolina Moscheni / Francesco Fioretti	428	2021/2022 (100%)				225	203
72	ITA	Carolina Moscheni / Francesco Fioretti	428	2020/2021 (100%)					
72	ITA	Carolina Moscheni / Francesco Fioretti	428	2019/2020 (70%)					
73	CAN	Emmy Bronsard / Aissa Bouaraguia	420	2021/2022 (100%)					
73	CAN	Emmy Bronsard / Aissa Bouaraguia	420	2020/2021 (100%)					
73	CAN	Emmy Bronsard / Aissa Bouaraguia	420	2019/2020 (70%)	151	142	127		
74	GBR	Phebe Bekker / James Hernandez	411	2021/2022 (100%)	194	120	97		
74	GBR	Phebe Bekker / James Hernandez	411	2020/2021 (100%)					
74	GBR	Phebe Bekker / James Hernandez	411	2019/2020 (70%)					
75	ITA	Victoria Manni / Carlo Roethlisberger	407	2021/2022 (100%)				164	164
75	ITA	Victoria Manni / Carlo Roethlisberger	407	2020/2021 (100%)					
75	ITA	Victoria Manni / Carlo Roethlisberger	407	2019/2020 (70%)	79				
76	POL	Anastasia Polibina / Pavel Golovishnikov	385	2021/2022 (100%)				203	182
76	POL	Anastasia Polibina / Pavel Golovishnikov	385	2020/2021 (100%)					
76	POL	Anastasia Polibina / Pavel Golovishnikov	385	2019/2020 (70%)					
77	ISR	Mariia Nosovitskaya / Mikhail Nosovitskiy	372	2021/2022 (100%)				203	
77	ISR	Mariia Nosovitskaya / Mikhail Nosovitskiy	372	2020/2021 (100%)					
77	ISR	Mariia Nosovitskaya / Mikhail Nosovitskiy	372	2019/2020 (70%)		93	76		
78	POL	Olivia Oliver / Joshua Andari	368	2021/2022 (100%)	127	133	108		
78	POL	Olivia Oliver / Joshua Andari	368	2020/2021 (100%)					
78	POL	Olivia Oliver / Joshua Andari	368	2019/2020 (70%)					
79	USA	Eva Pate / Logan Bye	367	2021/2022 (100%)				203	164
79	USA	Eva Pate / Logan Bye	367	2020/2021 (100%)					
79	USA	Eva Pate / Logan Bye	367	2019/2020 (70%)					
80	CZE	Katerina Mrazkova / Daniel Mrazek	364	2021/2022 (100%)		182	182		
80	CZE	Katerina Mrazkova / Daniel Mrazek	364	2020/2021 (100%)					
80	CZE	Katerina Mrazkova / Daniel Mrazek	364	2019/2020 (70%)					
81	CHN	Hong Chen / Zhuoming Sun	362	2021/2022 (100%)					
81	CHN	Hong Chen / Zhuoming Sun	362	2020/2021 (100%)					
81	CHN	Hong Chen / Zhuoming Sun	362	2019/2020 (70%)	228	134			
82	EST	Tatjana Bunina / Ivan Kuznetsov	355	2021/2022 (100%)	114	133	108		
82	EST	Tatjana Bunina / Ivan Kuznetsov	355	2020/2021 (100%)					
82	EST	Tatjana Bunina / Ivan Kuznetsov	355	2019/2020 (70%)					
83	UKR	Mariia Pinchuk / Mykyta Pogorielov	349	2021/2022 (100%)	93	148	108		
83	UKR	Mariia Pinchuk / Mykyta Pogorielov	349	2020/2021 (100%)					
83	UKR	Mariia Pinchuk / Mykyta Pogorielov	349	2019/2020 (70%)					
84	RUS	Olga Mamchenkova / Mark Volkov	346	2021/2022 (100%)		182	164		
84	RUS	Olga Mamchenkova / Mark Volkov	346	2020/2021 (100%)					
84	RUS	Olga Mamchenkova / Mark Volkov	346	2019/2020 (70%)					
84	RUS	Ekaterina Rybakova / Ivan Makhnonosov	346	2021/2022 (100%)		182	164		
84	RUS	Ekaterina Rybakova / Ivan Makhnonosov	346	2020/2021 (100%)					
84	RUS	Ekaterina Rybakova / Ivan Makhnonosov	346	2019/2020 (70%)					
86	RUS	Sofia Shevchenko / Igor Eremenko	324	2021/2022 (100%)					
86	RUS	Sofia Shevchenko / Igor Eremenko	324	2020/2021 (100%)					
86	RUS	Sofia Shevchenko / Igor Eremenko	324	2019/2020 (70%)		149		175	
87	CAN	Alicia Fabbri / Paul Ayer	323	2021/2022 (100%)				198	
87	CAN	Alicia Fabbri / Paul Ayer	323	2020/2021 (100%)					
87	CAN	Alicia Fabbri / Paul Ayer	323	2019/2020 (70%)				125	
88	GER	Anne-Marie Wolf / Max Liebers	316	2021/2022 (100%)				164	
88	GER	Anne-Marie Wolf / Max Liebers	316	2020/2021 (100%)					
88	GER	Anne-Marie Wolf / Max Liebers	316	2019/2020 (70%)		84	68		
89	CHN	Wanqi Ning / Chao Wang	310	2021/2022 (100%)					
89	CHN	Wanqi Ning / Chao Wang	310	2020/2021 (100%)					
89	CHN	Wanqi Ning / Chao Wang	310	2019/2020 (70%)	185			125	
90	BLR	Ekaterina Andreeva / Ivan Desyatov	297	2021/2022 (100%)		164	133		
90	BLR	Ekaterina Andreeva / Ivan Desyatov	297	2020/2021 (100%)					
90	BLR	Ekaterina Andreeva / Ivan Desyatov	297	2019/2020 (70%)					
91	USA	Leah Neset / Artem Markelov	284	2021/2022 (100%)		164	120		
91	USA	Leah Neset / Artem Markelov	284	2020/2021 (100%)					
91	USA	Leah Neset / Artem Markelov	284	2019/2020 (70%)					
92	FRA	Julia Wagret / Pierre Souquet-Basiege	278	2021/2022 (100%)					
92	FRA	Julia Wagret / Pierre Souquet-Basiege	278	2020/2021 (100%)					
92	FRA	Julia Wagret / Pierre Souquet-Basiege	278	2019/2020 (70%)				139	139
93	CAN	Molly Lanaghan / Dmitre Razgulajevs	268	2021/2022 (100%)					
93	CAN	Molly Lanaghan / Dmitre Razgulajevs	268	2020/2021 (100%)					
93	CAN	Molly Lanaghan / Dmitre Razgulajevs	268	2019/2020 (70%)				153	115
94	AUS	Matilda Friend / William Badaoui	259	2021/2022 (100%)					
94	AUS	Matilda Friend / William Badaoui	259	2020/2021 (100%)					
94	AUS	Matilda Friend / William Badaoui	259	2019/2020 (70%)	134			125	
95	HUN	Emily Monaghan / Ilias Fourati	257	2021/2022 (100%)					
95	HUN	Emily Monaghan / Ilias Fourati	257	2020/2021 (100%)					
95	HUN	Emily Monaghan / Ilias Fourati	257	2019/2020 (70%)				142	115
96	RUS	Arina Ushakova / Maxim Nekrasov	256	2021/2022 (100%)					
96	RUS	Arina Ushakova / Maxim Nekrasov	256	2020/2021 (100%)					
96	RUS	Arina Ushakova / Maxim Nekrasov	256	2019/2020 (70%)	256				
97	GBR	Robynne Tweedale / Joseph Buckland	254	2021/2022 (100%)					
97	GBR	Robynne Tweedale / Joseph Buckland	254	2020/2021 (100%)					
97	GBR	Robynne Tweedale / Joseph Buckland	254	2019/2020 (70%)				127	127
98	ITA	Nicole Calderari / Marco Cilli	253	2021/2022 (100%)		133	120		
98	ITA	Nicole Calderari / Marco Cilli	253	2020/2021 (100%)					
98	ITA	Nicole Calderari / Marco Cilli	253	2019/2020 (70%)					
99	HUN	Leia Dozzi / Michael Albert Valdez	242	2021/2022 (100%)					
99	HUN	Leia Dozzi / Michael Albert Valdez	242	2020/2021 (100%)					
99	HUN	Leia Dozzi / Michael Albert Valdez	242	2019/2020 (70%)				127	115
100	KAZ	Sofiya Lukinskaya / Danil Pak	240	2021/2022 (100%)		120	120		
100	KAZ	Sofiya Lukinskaya / Danil Pak	240	2020/2021 (100%)					
100	KAZ	Sofiya Lukinskaya / Danil Pak	240	2019/2020 (70%)					
101	ITA	Carolina Portesi Peroni / Michael Chrastecky	234	2021/2022 (100%)					
101	ITA	Carolina Portesi Peroni / Michael Chrastecky	234	2020/2021 (100%)					
101	ITA	Carolina Portesi Peroni / Michael Chrastecky	234	2019/2020 (70%)	65	93	76		
102	RUS	Sofia Leonteva / Daniil Gorelkin	225	2021/2022 (100%)		225			
102	RUS	Sofia Leonteva / Daniil Gorelkin	225	2020/2021 (100%)					
102	RUS	Sofia Leonteva / Daniil Gorelkin	225	2019/2020 (70%)					
102	RUS	Ekaterina Mironova / Evgenii Ustenko	225	2021/2022 (100%)				225	
102	RUS	Ekaterina Mironova / Evgenii Ustenko	225	2020/2021 (100%)					
102	RUS	Ekaterina Mironova / Evgenii Ustenko	225	2019/2020 (70%)					
104	USA	Ella Ales / Daniel Tsarik	219	2021/2022 (100%)					
104	USA	Ella Ales / Daniel Tsarik	219	2020/2021 (100%)					
104	USA	Ella Ales / Daniel Tsarik	219	2019/2020 (70%)		115	104		
105	CAN	Hailey Yu / Brendan Giang	217	2021/2022 (100%)		120	97		
105	CAN	Hailey Yu / Brendan Giang	217	2020/2021 (100%)					
105	CAN	Hailey Yu / Brendan Giang	217	2019/2020 (70%)					
106	EST	Aleksandra Samersova / Kevin Ojala	203	2021/2022 (100%)				203	
106	EST	Aleksandra Samersova / Kevin Ojala	203	2020/2021 (100%)					
106	EST	Aleksandra Samersova / Kevin Ojala	203	2019/2020 (70%)					
107	ITA	Giorgia Galimberti / Matteo Libasse Mandelli	200	2021/2022 (100%)	103	97			
107	ITA	Giorgia Galimberti / Matteo Libasse Mandelli	200	2020/2021 (100%)					
107	ITA	Giorgia Galimberti / Matteo Libasse Mandelli	200	2019/2020 (70%)					
108	SUI	Kayleigh Maksymec / Maximilien Rahier	183	2021/2022 (100%)	75	108			
108	SUI	Kayleigh Maksymec / Maximilien Rahier	183	2020/2021 (100%)					
108	SUI	Kayleigh Maksymec / Maximilien Rahier	183	2019/2020 (70%)					
109	GER	Lara Luft / Maximilian Pfisterer	182	2021/2022 (100%)				182	
109	GER	Lara Luft / Maximilian Pfisterer	182	2020/2021 (100%)					
109	GER	Lara Luft / Maximilian Pfisterer	182	2019/2020 (70%)					
109	ISR	Shira Ichilov / Volodymyr Byelikov	182	2021/2022 (100%)				182	
109	ISR	Shira Ichilov / Volodymyr Byelikov	182	2020/2021 (100%)					
109	ISR	Shira Ichilov / Volodymyr Byelikov	182	2019/2020 (70%)					
109	LAT	Aurelija Ipolito / Luke Russell	182	2021/2022 (100%)				182	
109	LAT	Aurelija Ipolito / Luke Russell	182	2020/2021 (100%)					
109	LAT	Aurelija Ipolito / Luke Russell	182	2019/2020 (70%)					
109	LTU	Paulina Ramanauskaite / Deividas Kizala	182	2021/2022 (100%)				182	
109	LTU	Paulina Ramanauskaite / Deividas Kizala	182	2020/2021 (100%)					
109	LTU	Paulina Ramanauskaite / Deividas Kizala	182	2019/2020 (70%)					
109	UKR	Anastasiia Sammel / Danylo Yefremenko	182	2021/2022 (100%)				182	
109	UKR	Anastasiia Sammel / Danylo Yefremenko	182	2020/2021 (100%)					
109	UKR	Anastasiia Sammel / Danylo Yefremenko	182	2019/2020 (70%)					
114	HUN	Anna Yanovskaya / Adam Lukacs	178	2021/2022 (100%)				178	
114	HUN	Anna Yanovskaya / Adam Lukacs	178	2020/2021 (100%)					
114	HUN	Anna Yanovskaya / Adam Lukacs	178	2019/2020 (70%)					
115	JPN	Rikako Fukase / Eichu Oliver Cho	166	2021/2022 (100%)					
115	JPN	Rikako Fukase / Eichu Oliver Cho	166	2020/2021 (100%)					
115	JPN	Rikako Fukase / Eichu Oliver Cho	166	2019/2020 (70%)	166				
116	BLR	Karina Sidarenka / Maksim Yalenich	164	2021/2022 (100%)				164	
116	BLR	Karina Sidarenka / Maksim Yalenich	164	2020/2021 (100%)					
116	BLR	Karina Sidarenka / Maksim Yalenich	164	2019/2020 (70%)					
116	RUS	Sofiia Kachushkina / Oleg Muratov	164	2021/2022 (100%)		164			
116	RUS	Sofiia Kachushkina / Oleg Muratov	164	2020/2021 (100%)					
116	RUS	Sofiia Kachushkina / Oleg Muratov	164	2019/2020 (70%)					
116	SVK	Maria Sofia Pucherova / Nikita Lysak	164	2021/2022 (100%)				164	
116	SVK	Maria Sofia Pucherova / Nikita Lysak	164	2020/2021 (100%)					
116	SVK	Maria Sofia Pucherova / Nikita Lysak	164	2019/2020 (70%)					
116	USA	Lorraine McNamara / Anton Spiridonov	164	2021/2022 (100%)				164	
116	USA	Lorraine McNamara / Anton Spiridonov	164	2020/2021 (100%)					
116	USA	Lorraine McNamara / Anton Spiridonov	164	2019/2020 (70%)					
120	JPN	Nao Kida / Masaya Morita	157	2021/2022 (100%)	157				
120	JPN	Nao Kida / Masaya Morita	157	2020/2021 (100%)					
120	JPN	Nao Kida / Masaya Morita	157	2019/2020 (70%)					
121	ITA	Noemi Maria Tali / Stefano Frasca	148	2021/2022 (100%)		148			
121	ITA	Noemi Maria Tali / Stefano Frasca	148	2020/2021 (100%)					
121	ITA	Noemi Maria Tali / Stefano Frasca	148	2019/2020 (70%)					
121	RUS	Margarita Svistunova / Dmitrii Studenikin	148	2021/2022 (100%)		148			
121	RUS	Margarita Svistunova / Dmitrii Studenikin	148	2020/2021 (100%)					
121	RUS	Margarita Svistunova / Dmitrii Studenikin	148	2019/2020 (70%)					
121	ESP	Sofia Val / Nikita Vitryanyuk	148	2021/2022 (100%)		148			
121	ESP	Sofia Val / Nikita Vitryanyuk	148	2020/2021 (100%)					
121	ESP	Sofia Val / Nikita Vitryanyuk	148	2019/2020 (70%)					
124	RUS	Angelina Lazareva / Maksim Prokofiev	142	2021/2022 (100%)					
124	RUS	Angelina Lazareva / Maksim Prokofiev	142	2020/2021 (100%)					
124	RUS	Angelina Lazareva / Maksim Prokofiev	142	2019/2020 (70%)		142			
125	ISR	Elizabeth Tkachenko / Alexei Kiliakov	141	2021/2022 (100%)	141				
125	ISR	Elizabeth Tkachenko / Alexei Kiliakov	141	2020/2021 (100%)					
125	ISR	Elizabeth Tkachenko / Alexei Kiliakov	141	2019/2020 (70%)					
126	CAN	Alyssa Robinson / Jacob Portz	133	2021/2022 (100%)		133			
126	CAN	Alyssa Robinson / Jacob Portz	133	2020/2021 (100%)					
126	CAN	Alyssa Robinson / Jacob Portz	133	2019/2020 (70%)					
127	KAZ	Maxine Weatherby / Temirlan Yerzhanov	121	2021/2022 (100%)					
127	KAZ	Maxine Weatherby / Temirlan Yerzhanov	121	2020/2021 (100%)					
127	KAZ	Maxine Weatherby / Temirlan Yerzhanov	121	2019/2020 (70%)	121				
128	CAN	Chaima Ben Khelifa / Everest Zhu	120	2021/2022 (100%)		120			
128	CAN	Chaima Ben Khelifa / Everest Zhu	120	2020/2021 (100%)					
128	CAN	Chaima Ben Khelifa / Everest Zhu	120	2019/2020 (70%)					
129	RUS	Julia Tultseva / Anatoliy Belovodchenko	115	2021/2022 (100%)					
129	RUS	Julia Tultseva / Anatoliy Belovodchenko	115	2020/2021 (100%)					
129	RUS	Julia Tultseva / Anatoliy Belovodchenko	115	2019/2020 (70%)				115	
130	FRA	Louise Bordet / Thomas Gipoulou	108	2021/2022 (100%)		108			
130	FRA	Louise Bordet / Thomas Gipoulou	108	2020/2021 (100%)					
130	FRA	Louise Bordet / Thomas Gipoulou	108	2019/2020 (70%)					
130	RUS	Elizaveta Shichina / Gordey Khubulov	108	2021/2022 (100%)		108			
130	RUS	Elizaveta Shichina / Gordey Khubulov	108	2020/2021 (100%)					
130	RUS	Elizaveta Shichina / Gordey Khubulov	108	2019/2020 (70%)					
132	RUS	Tamara Zhukova / Daniil Karpov	104	2021/2022 (100%)					
132	RUS	Tamara Zhukova / Daniil Karpov	104	2020/2021 (100%)					
132	RUS	Tamara Zhukova / Daniil Karpov	104	2019/2020 (70%)		104			
133	CZE	Denisa Cimlova / Vilem Hlavsa	97	2021/2022 (100%)		97			
133	CZE	Denisa Cimlova / Vilem Hlavsa	97	2020/2021 (100%)					
133	CZE	Denisa Cimlova / Vilem Hlavsa	97	2019/2020 (70%)					
133	FRA	Lou Koch / Ivan Melnyk	97	2021/2022 (100%)		97			
133	FRA	Lou Koch / Ivan Melnyk	97	2020/2021 (100%)					
133	FRA	Lou Koch / Ivan Melnyk	97	2019/2020 (70%)					
133	GER	Karla Maria Karl / Kai Hoferichter	97	2021/2022 (100%)		97			
133	GER	Karla Maria Karl / Kai Hoferichter	97	2020/2021 (100%)					
133	GER	Karla Maria Karl / Kai Hoferichter	97	2019/2020 (70%)					
133	UKR	Lika Bondar / Artem Koval	97	2021/2022 (100%)		97			
133	UKR	Lika Bondar / Artem Koval	97	2020/2021 (100%)					
133	UKR	Lika Bondar / Artem Koval	97	2019/2020 (70%)					
137	RUS	Svetlana Lizunova / Alexander Vakhnov	84	2021/2022 (100%)					
137	RUS	Svetlana Lizunova / Alexander Vakhnov	84	2020/2021 (100%)					
137	RUS	Svetlana Lizunova / Alexander Vakhnov	84	2019/2020 (70%)		84			
138	SVK	Anna Simova / Kirill Aksenov	83	2021/2022 (100%)	83				
138	SVK	Anna Simova / Kirill Aksenov	83	2020/2021 (100%)					
138	SVK	Anna Simova / Kirill Aksenov	83	2019/2020 (70%)					
139	CAN	Jessica Li / Jacob Richmond	76	2021/2022 (100%)					
139	CAN	Jessica Li / Jacob Richmond	76	2020/2021 (100%)					
139	CAN	Jessica Li / Jacob Richmond	76	2019/2020 (70%)		76			
139	CAN	Olivia Mcisaac / Corey Circelli	76	2021/2022 (100%)					
139	CAN	Olivia Mcisaac / Corey Circelli	76	2020/2021 (100%)					
139	CAN	Olivia Mcisaac / Corey Circelli	76	2019/2020 (70%)		76			
141	GEO	Yulia Lebedeva-Bitadze / Dmitri Parkhomenko	68	2021/2022 (100%)	68				
141	GEO	Yulia Lebedeva-Bitadze / Dmitri Parkhomenko	68	2020/2021 (100%)					
141	GEO	Yulia Lebedeva-Bitadze / Dmitri Parkhomenko	68	2019/2020 (70%)					

=== Season's World Ranking ===
==== Men ====
As of May 28, 2022.

Rank	Nation	Skater	Points	ISU Championships or Olympics	(Junior) Grand Prix and Final		Selected International Competition	
Rank	Nation	Skater	Points	Best	Best	2nd Best	Best	2nd Best
1	USA	Vincent Zhou	2282	972	400	360	300	250
2	JPN	Yuma Kagiyama	2130	1080	400	400	250	
3	JPN	Shoma Uno	1960	1200	400	360		
4	USA	Nathan Chen	1924	1200	400	324		
5	GEO	Morisi Kvitelashvili	1898	875	400	236	243	144
6	ITA	Daniel Grassl	1863	756	324	213	300	270
7	USA	Jason Brown	1693	709	360	324	300	
8	LAT	Deniss Vasiljevs	1665	680	292	292	219	182
9	JPN	Kazuki Tomono	1566	756	324	236	250	
10	RUS	Mark Kondratiuk	1544	840	191		270	243
11	USA	Ilia Malinin	1510	517	250	250	250	243
12	CAN	Keegan Messing	1435	418	262	236	300	219
13	KOR	Junhwan Cha	1426	840	324	262		
14	ITA	Matteo Rizzo	1417	465	262	262	250	178
15	RUS	Andrei Mozalev	1338	612	213		270	243
16	RUS	Evgeni Semenenko	1332	574	324	236	198	
17	FRA	Adam Siao Him Fa	1305	574	191		270	270
18	USA	Camden Pulkinen	1182	787	213		182	
19	EST	Arlet Levandi	1092	214	225	225	250	178
20	USA	Jimmy Ma	1055	325	262		243	225
21	CAN	Wesley Chiu	1037	365	250	203	219	
22	EST	Mihhail Selevko	1035	295	148	148	225	219
23	JPN	Sena Miyake	997	612			225	160
24	RUS	Mikhail Kolyada	990		360	360	270	
25	CHN	Boyang Jin	933	517	213		203	
26	JPN	Sota Yamamoto	929		213	213	300	203
27	ITA	Nikolaj Memola	880	266	182		250	182
28	JPN	Shun Sato	877		360	292	225	
29	JPN	Yuzuru Hanyu	875	875				
30	JPN	Kao Miura	871	680	191			
31	ITA	Gabriele Frangipani	862	362			250	250
32	AUS	Brendan Kerry	834	496			178	160
33	CAN	Roman Sadovsky	813	377	292		144	
34	CZE	Michal Brezina	811	325	236		250	
35	AZE	Vladimir Litvintsev	799	402			219	178
36	KAZ	Mikhail Shaidorov	776	551	225			
37	RUS	Petr Gumennik	734		191		300	243
38	RUS	Dmitri Aliev	730		262		243	225
39	AUT	Maurizio Zandron	722	222			250	250
40	KAZ	Dias Jirenbayev	712	237	108		203	164
41	SUI	Lukas Britschgi	707	293			250	164
42	CAN	Corey Circelli	657	293	182	182		
43	KOR	Sihyeong Lee	644	446			198	
43	UKR	Ivan Shmuratko	644	264			198	182
45	RUS	Artem Kovalev	632		225	182	225	
46	JPN	Tatsuya Tsuboi	630	405			225	
46	RUS	Alexander Samarin	630		236	191	203	
48	FRA	Kevin Aymoz	606	446			160	
49	USA	Tomoki Hiwatashi	600	402			198	
50	GER	Nikita Starostin	584	237			203	144
50	RUS	Makar Ignatov	584		292	292		
52	ESP	Tomas-Llorenc Guarino Sabate	560	146			250	164
53	GBR	Edward Appleby	550	68	203	97	182	
54	MON	Davide Lewton Brain	541	113			225	203
55	FIN	Valtter Virtanen	533	126			225	182
56	GEO	Nika Egadze	519				300	219
57	SUI	Naoki Rossi	517	215	182	120		
58	FRA	Luc Economides	500				250	250
58	RUS	Gleb Lutfullin	500		250	250		
60	GBR	Graham Newberry	490	162			164	164
61	CZE	Georgii Reshtenko	482	174	164		144	
62	EST	Aleksandr Selevko	475				250	225
62	RUS	Ilya Yablokov	475		250	225		
64	SVK	Adam Hagara	467	61			203	203
65	SWE	Andreas Nordebäck	466	194	164	108		
66	RUS	Kirill Sarnovskiy	453		250	203		
67	AUT	Luc Maierhofer	450				225	225
67	FRA	Romain Ponsart	450				225	225
69	USA	Liam Kapeikis	442	239			203	
70	FRA	Landry Le May	428				225	203
70	RUS	Egor Rukhin	428		225	203		
72	SWE	Nikolaj Majorov	405	180			225	
73	JPN	Lucas Tsuyoshi Honda	397	127			270	
74	LAT	Daniels Kockers	392		120	108	164	
75	KOR	Younghyun Cha	390	75	182	133		
76	CRO	Jari Kessler	367				203	164
76	USA	William Annis	367		203	164		
78	ITA	Emanuele Indelicato	364				182	182
79	CAN	Joseph Phan	362	362				
80	FRA	Francois Pitot	351		203	148		
81	SUI	Nurullah Sahaka	346				182	164
82	USA	Lucas Broussard	345		225	120		
83	CAN	Stephen Gogolev	328	328				
84	MEX	Donovan Carrillo	295	131			164	
85	RUS	Andrei Anisimov	281		148	133		
86	ARM	Slavik Hayrapetyan	277	74			203	
87	TUR	Burak Demirboga	265	83			182	
88	GEO	Irakli Maysuradze	250				250	
88	POL	Vladimir Samoilov	250				250	
90	USA	Kai Kovar	247	83	164			
91	ISR	Lev Vinokur	236	103	133			
92	UKR	Vadym Novikov	230		133	97		
93	KOR	Hyungyeom Kim	228		120	108		
94	ITA	Alessandro Fadini	225				225	
95	KOR	Jaeseok Kyeong	214	214				
96	FRA	Corentin Spinar	213	93	120			
97	GER	Kai Jagoda	203				203	
97	GBR	Peter James Hallam	203				203	
97	ESP	Pablo Garcia	203				203	
97	SWE	Gabriel Folkesson	203				203	
97	USA	Maxim Naumov	203				203	
97	USA	Matthew Nielsen	203		203			
97	USA	Eric Sjoberg	203				203	
104	JPN	Koshiro Shimada	198				198	
105	AUS	James Min	192	192				
106	CAN	Nam Nguyen	191		191			
107	FRA	Sami Hammi	182				182	
107	HUN	Andras Csernoch	182				182	
107	ISR	Mark Gorodnitsky	182				182	
107	SVK	Michael Neuman	182				182	
107	ESP	Iker Oyarzabal Albas	182				182	
107	SWE	Oliver Praetorius	182				182	
107	UKR	Mykhailo Rudkovskyi	182				182	
107	USA	Yaroslav Paniot	182				182	
107	USA	Maxim Zharkov	182		182			
116	ISR	Alexei Bychenko	178				178	
117	POL	Jakub Lofek	177	44	133			
118	AUS	Jordan Dodds	173	173				
118	GER	Paul Fentz	173	173				
120	BUL	Larry Loupolover	164				164	
120	BUL	Beat Schümperli	164				164	
120	CZE	Matyas Belohradsky	164				164	
120	FRA	Joshua Rols	164				164	
120	FRA	Ian Vauclin	164		164			
120	GER	Denis Gurdzhi	164				164	
120	GBR	Ken Fitterer	164				164	
120	HUN	Mozes Jozsef Berei	164				164	
120	ISR	Daniel Samohin	164				164	
120	KAZ	Rakhat Bralin	164				164	
120	KOR	Jaekeun Lee	164		164			
120	RUS	Fedor Zonov	164		164			
132	BLR	Konstantin Milyukov	162	162				
133	FIN	Makar Suntsev	148		148			
133	SWE	Casper Johansson	148		148			
133	USA	Jacob Sanchez	148		148			
136	GER	Louis Weissert	146	49	97			
137	RUS	Alexey Erokhov	144				144	
138	POL	Kornel Witkowski	140	140				
139	TPE	Yu-Hsiang Li	133		133			
139	TUR	Alp Eren Ozkan	133		133			
141	CAN	Matthew Newnham	120		120			
141	SWE	Jonathan Egyptson	120		120			
143	ITA	Raffaele Francesco Zich	114	114				
144	TPE	Fang-Yi Lin	108		108			
144	ITA	Matteo Nalbone	108		108			
144	UKR	Fedir Kulish	108		108			
147	BLR	Alexander Lebedev	97		97			
147	CAN	Alec Guinzbourg	97		97			
147	ISR	Iakov Pogrebinskii	97		97			
147	RUS	Aleksandr Golubev	97		97			
151	GEO	Konstantin Supatashvili	55	55				

==== Women ====
As of May 29, 2022.

Rank	Nation	Skater	Points	ISU Championships or Olympics	(Junior) Grand Prix and Final		Selected International Competition	
Rank	Nation	Skater	Points	Best	Best	2nd Best	Best	2nd Best
1	RUS	Anna Shcherbakova	2225	1200	400	400	225	
2	USA	Alysa Liu	2126	972	292	262	300	300
3	JPN	Kaori Sakamoto	2117	1200	400	292	225	
4	RUS	Kamila Valieva	1975	875	400	400	300	
5	KOR	Young You	1930	787	324	324	270	225
6	BEL	Loena Hendrickx	1885	1080	324	262	219	
7	RUS	Alexandra Trusova	1730	1080	400		250	
8	JPN	Mai Mihara	1674	840	292	292	250	
9	JPN	Wakaba Higuchi	1647	787	324	236	300	
10	USA	Mariah Bell	1606	875	292	236	203	
11	USA	Lindsay Thorngren	1281	405	250	203	225	198
12	AZE	Ekaterina Ryabova	1250	517	213		270	250
13	RUS	Maiia Khromykh	1234		360	324	300	250
14	USA	Karen Chen	1233	574	262		219	178
15	EST	Niina Petrokina	1230	402	182	133	270	243
16	JPN	Rino Matsuike	1228	551	236	191	250	
17	GEO	Anastasiia Gubanova	1207	709			300	198
18	KOR	Haein Lee	1194	756	213		225	
19	BLR	Viktoriia Safonova	1118	362	213		300	243
20	KOR	Yelim Kim	1107	680	236	191		
21	GER	Nicole Schott	1100	465	191		225	219
22	POL	Ekaterina Kurakova	1091	551			270	270
23	USA	Audrey Shin	1074	612			243	219
24	RUS	Elizaveta Tuktamysheva	990		360	360	270	
25	USA	Isabeau Levito	975	500	250	225		
26	CAN	Madeline Schizas	968	377	236	191	164	
27	RUS	Alena Kostornaia	927		360	324	243	
28	USA	Gabriella Izzo	824	402			219	203
29	KOR	Jia Shin	801	450	203	148		
30	SUI	Alexia Paganini	763	325			219	219
31	USA	Starr Andrews	758	362			198	198
32	FRA	Lea Serna	739	264			250	225
33	USA	Amber Glenn	719		236	213	270	
34	KOR	Ahsun Yun	693	365	164	164		
35	KOR	Yeonjeong Park	686		191		270	225
36	USA	Clare Seo	680	295	203	182		
37	SWE	Josefin Taljegard	667	214			250	203
38	JPN	Mana Kawabe	635	275	360			
39	NED	Lindsay Van Zundert	632	222			250	160
40	CAN	Gabrielle Daleman	629	325			160	144
41	KOR	Seoyeon Ji	607		182	182	243	
42	ROU	Julia Sauter	606	200			203	203
42	SLO	Dasa Grm	606	106			250	250
44	TPE	Tzu-Han Ting	599	192			225	182
45	ITA	Lara Naki Gutmann	596	173			225	198
46	CZE	Eliska Brezinova	590	162			225	203
47	AUS	Kailani Craine	568	264			160	144
48	BUL	Alexandra Feigin	563	113			225	225
49	RUS	Kseniia Sinitsyna	554		292	262		
50	GEO	Alina Urushadze	547		133		250	164
51	FIN	Linnea Ceder	542	157			203	182
52	UKR	Anastasiia Shabotova	538		97		243	198
53	SUI	Yasmine Kimiko Yamada	529	126			225	178
54	FIN	Olivia Lisko	503		97		203	203
55	RUS	Sofia Akateva	500		250	250		
56	CYP	Marilena Kitromilis	498				300	198
57	BEL	Nina Pinzarrone	486	174	164	148		
58	AUT	Sophia Schaller	475				250	225
58	ITA	Lucrezia Beccari	475				250	225
58	JPN	Satoko Miyahara	475		262	213		
58	RUS	Sofia Muravieva	475		250	225		
62	FIN	Emmi Peltonen	469				250	219
63	FIN	Jenni Saarinen	468	140			164	164
64	JPN	Rion Sumiyoshi	464	239			225	
65	IND	Tara Prasad	459	113			182	164
66	AUT	Stefanie Pesendorfer	453				250	203
66	EST	Eva-Lotta Kiibus	453	293			160	
66	FIN	Oona Ounasvuori	453				250	203
66	KOR	Eunsoo Lim	453		262	191		
66	RUS	Adeliia Petrosian	453		250	203		
71	JPN	Yuhana Yokoi	446	446				
72	JPN	Rinka Watanabe	444	194			250	
73	CAN	Kaiya Ruiter	428		225	203		
73	HUN	Julia Lang	428				225	203
73	LAT	Angelina Kuchvalska	428				225	203
73	RUS	Sofia Samodelkina	428		225	203		
73	RUS	Anastasia Zinina	428		225	203		
78	NZL	Jocelyn Hong	417	214			203	
79	RUS	Sofia Samodurova	416		213		203	
80	GER	Kristina Isaev	410				250	160
81	RUS	Elizaveta Kulikova	407		225	182		
82	GBR	Natasha Mckay	406	156			250	
83	NOR	Linnea Kilsand	389				225	164
83	KOR	Chaeyeon Kim	389		225	164		
83	SVK	Alexandra Michaela Filcova	389				225	164
86	SUI	Kimmy Repond	386	266	120			
87	LTU	Jogaile Aglinskyte	372	44			164	164
88	BEL	Jade Hovine	364				182	182
89	FRA	Maia Mazzara	360				182	178
89	RUS	Daria Usacheva	360		360			
91	ITA	Ginevra Lavinia Negrello	347		97		250	
92	SRB	Antonina Dubinina	346				182	164
93	POL	Noelle Streuli	344	114	133	97		
94	PHI	Sofia Lexi Jacqueline Frank	337	173			164	
95	KOR	Seoyeong Wi	328	328				
96	CAN	Emily Bausback	320				160	160
97	HUN	Regina Schermann	308	83			225	
98	FRA	Lorine Schild	306	103			203	
99	AUT	Olga Mikutina	305	305				
100	BLR	Milana Ramashova	298		120		178	
100	GER	Nargiz Sueleymanova	298		120		178	
102	BLR	Varvara Kisel	297		164	133		
103	USA	Kate Wang	296		148	148		
104	CAN	Alison Schumacher	293	293				
105	USA	Mia Kalin	281		148	133		
105	USA	Ava Marie Ziegler	281		148	133		
107	LTU	Aleksandra Golovkina	274	92			182	
108	SWE	Emelie Ling	265	83			182	
109	EST	Kristina Shkuleta-Gromova	250				250	
109	GBR	Kristen Spours	250				250	
109	JPN	Hana Yoshida	250				250	
109	ROU	Ana Sofia Beschea	250				250	
109	RUS	Veronika Zhilina	250		250			
114	CAN	Veronik Mallet	237	237				
115	HUN	Vivien Papp	228		120	108		
116	SVK	Ema Doboszova	225				225	
116	SUI	Livia Kaiser	225				225	
118	CAN	Lia Pereira	224	127	97			
119	FIN	Janna Jyrkinen	216		108	108		
120	HKG	Joanna So	203				203	
120	ISR	Taylor Morris	203				203	
120	JPN	Mone Chiba	203				203	
120	NOR	Frida Turiddotter Berge	203				203	
124	EST	Nataly Langerbaur	182				182	
124	FIN	Laura Karhunen	182				182	
124	ITA	Marina Piredda	182				182	
124	KAZ	Bagdana Rakhishova	182				182	
124	POL	Elzbieta Gabryszak	182				182	
124	KOR	Minchae Kim	182		182			
124	RUS	Mariia Pulina	182				182	
124	RUS	Mariia Zakharova	182		182			
124	TUR	Sinem Pekder	182				182	
124	USA	Sierra Venetta	182				182	
134	KOR	Siwon Lee	178				178	
135	BUL	Ivelina Baycheva	164				164	
135	BUL	Kristina Grigorova	164				164	
135	CHI	Yae-Mia Neira	164				164	
135	CZE	Nikola Rychtarikova	164				164	
135	FRA	Mae Berenice Meite	164				164	
135	HUN	Bernadett Szigeti	164				164	
135	ITA	Roberta Rodeghiero	164				164	
135	ITA	Ester Schwarz	164				164	
135	KOR	Heesue Han	164		164			
135	RUS	Elizaveta Berestovskaia	164		164			
135	SUI	Shaline Rueger	164				164	
135	USA	Paige Rydberg	164				164	
147	USA	Hanna Harrell	160				160	
148	AUS	Victoria Alcantara	156	156				
149	FRA	Lola Ghozali	148		148			
150	KAZ	Anastassiya Lobanova	144				144	
151	ITA	Anna Pezzetta	141	141				
152	MEX	Andrea Montesinoscantu	140	140				
153	KOR	Siwoo Song	133		133			
154	MEX	Eugenia Garza	126	126				
155	KOR	Chaebin Hwang	120		120			
155	USA	Josephine Lee	120		120			
155	USA	Maryn Pierce	120		120			
158	CAN	Catherine Carle	108		108			
158	EST	Amalia Zelenjak	108		108			
158	LAT	Nikola Fomchenkova	108		108			
158	SUI	Anna La Porta	108		108			
162	CAN	Sara-Maude Dupuis	97		97			
162	POL	Karolina Bialas	97		97			
164	CZE	Barbora Vrankova	93	93				
165	ISR	Mariia Seniuk	75	75				
166	NED	Julia Van Dijk	68	68				
167	CAN	Justine Miclette	61	61				
168	GER	Olesya Ray	49	49				

==== Pairs ====
As of May 29, 2022.

Rank	Nation	Skater	Points	ISU Championships or Olympics	(Junior) Grand Prix and Final		Selected International Competition	
Rank	Nation	Skater	Points	Best	Best	2nd Best	Best	2nd Best
1	RUS	Evgenia Tarasova / Vladimir Morozov	2410	1080	400	360	300	270
2	USA	Alexa Knierim / Brandon Frazier	2291	1200	324	292	250	225
3	RUS	Anastasia Mishina / Aleksandr Galliamov	2072	972	400	400	300	
4	JPN	Riku Miura / Ryuichi Kihara	2064	1080	360	324	300	
5	CAN	Vanessa James / Eric Radford	2045	972	292	292	270	219
6	CHN	Wenjing Sui / Cong Han	2000	1200	400	400		
7	USA	Audrey Lu / Misha Mitrofanov	1897	840	292	262	300	203
8	USA	Ashley Cain-Gribble / Timothy Leduc	1676	574	324	292	243	243
9	RUS	Aleksandra Boikova / Dmitrii Kozlovskii	1599	875	400	324		
10	GER	Minerva Fabienne Hase / Nolan Seegert	1562	787	262	213	300	
11	GEO	Karina Safina / Luka Berulava	1546	875	225	203	243	
12	ITA	Rebecca Ghilardi / Filippo Ambrosini	1460	551	262	262	203	182
13	HUN	Ioulia Chtchetinina / Mark Magyar	1171	496	236	236	203	
14	CHN	Cheng Peng / Yang Jin	1147	787	360			
15	CAN	Evelyn Walsh / Trennt Michaud	1136	709	236	191		
16	ITA	Nicole Della Monica / Matteo Guarise	1094	339	292	213	250	
17	CAN	Kirsten Moore-Towers / Michael Marinaro	963	465	262	236		
18	USA	Emily Chan / Spencer Akira Howe	938	756			182	
19	RUS	Iuliia Artemeva / Mikhail Nazarychev	927		360	324	243	
20	ESP	Laura Barquero / Marco Zandron	913	418			270	225
21	RUS	Alina Pepeleva / Roman Pleshkov	855		236	236	219	164
22	CAN	Deanna Stellato-Dudek / Maxime Deschamps	831	612			219	
23	AUT	Miriam Ziegler / Severin Kiefer	829	638	191			
24	ITA	Sara Conti / Niccolo Macii	823	446	213		164	
25	FRA	Camille Kovalev / Pavel Kovalev	787	574	213			
26	AUS	Anastasia Golubeva / Hektor Giotopoulos Moore	778	450	164	164		
27	RUS	Iasmina Kadyrova / Ivan Balchenko	770		324		243	203
28	USA	Jessica Calalang / Brian Johnson	757		262		270	225
29	USA	Katie McBeath / Nathan Bartholomay	749	551			198	
30	NED	Daria Danilova / Michel Tsiba	742	517			225	
31	RUS	Daria Pavliuchenko / Denis Khodykin	720		360	360		
32	CAN	Lori-Ann Matte / Thierry Ferland	709	496	213			
33	RUS	Anastasia Mukhortova / Dmitry Evgenyev	700		250	225	225	
34	USA	Anastasiia Smirnova / Danylo Siianytsia	695	365	182	148		
35	GBR	Zoe Jones / Christopher Boyadji	656	465	191			
36	ESP	Dorota Broda / Pedro Betegon Martin	643	418			225	
37	UKR	Violetta Sierova / Ivan Khobta	592	295	164	133		
38	ISR	Hailey Kops / Evgeni Krasnopolski	575	377			198	
39	USA	Chelsea Liu / Danny O'Shea	559		213		182	164
40	RUS	Karina Akapova / Nikita Rakhmanin	500				250	250
40	RUS	Ekaterina Chikmareva / Matvei Ianchenkov	500		250	250		
42	GEO	Anastasiia Metelkina / Daniil Parkman	495				270	225
43	CZE	Barbora Kucianova / Lukas Vochozka	481	215	133	133		
44	RUS	Natalia Khabibullina / Ilya Knyazhuk	475		250	225		
45	HUN	Maria Pavlova / Balazs Nagy	457	293			164	
46	GER	Annika Hocke / Robert Kunkel	456	237			219	
47	GER	Letizia Roscher / Luis Schuster	436	328	108			
48	ITA	Anna Valesi / Manuel Piazza	428				225	203
48	RUS	Ekaterina Petushkova / Evgenii Malikov	428		225	203		
50	CAN	Chloe Panetta / Kieran Thrasher	414	266	148			
51	NED	Nika Osipova / Dmitry Epstein	406				203	203
51	RUS	Polina Kostiukovich / Aleksei Briukhanov	406		203	203		
53	CAN	Brooke McIntosh / Benjamin Mimar	405	405				
54	FRA	Coline Keriven / Noel-Antoine Pierre	373		191		182	
55	RUS	Ekaterina Storublevtceva / Artem Gritsaenko	364		182	182		
56	ITA	Alyssa Montan / Filippo Clerici	359	239	120			
57	UKR	Sofiia Holichenko / Artem Darenskyi	356	192			164	
58	BLR	Bogdana Lukashevich / Alexander Stepanov	325	325				
59	FRA	Oxana Vouillamoz / Flavien Giniaux	291	194	97			
60	USA	Isabelle Martins / Ryan Bedard	284		164	120		
61	CZE	Jelizaveta Zukova / Martin Bidar	264	264				
62	GBR	Anastasia Vaipan-Law / Luke Digby	250				250	
62	ITA	Irma Caldara / Riccardo Maglio	250				250	
64	FIN	Milania Vaananen / Mikhail Akulov	182				182	
64	FRA	Cleo Hamon / Denys Strekalin	182				182	
64	RUS	Kseniia Akhanteva / Valerii Kolesov	182		182			
67	CRO	Lana Petranovic / Antonio Souza Kordeiru	173	173				
68	FRA	Oceane Piegad / Remi Belmonte	164				164	
68	GBR	Lydia Smart / Harry Mattick	164				164	
70	CAN	Meghan Fredette / William St-Louis	148		148			
70	UZB	Anastasiya Sazonova / Jamshid Tashmukhamedov	148		148			
72	SVK	Margareta Muskova / Oliver Kubacak	108		108			
73	USA	Cate Fleming / Chase Finster	97		97			

==== Ice Dance ====
As of May 29, 2022.

Rank	Nation	Skater	Points	ISU Championships or Olympics	(Junior) Grand Prix and Final		Selected International Competition	
Rank	Nation	Skater	Points	Best	Best	2nd Best	Best	2nd Best
1	FRA	Gabriella Papadakis / Guillaume Cizeron	2300	1200	400	400	300	
2	ITA	Charlene Guignard / Marco Fabbri	2195	875	360	360	300	300
3	USA	Madison Hubbell / Zachary Donohue	2090	1080	400	360	250	
4	USA	Madison Chock / Evan Bates	1962	972	360	360	270	
5	USA	Caroline Green / Michael Parsons	1887	840	292	262	250	243
6	RUS	Victoria Sinitsina / Nikita Katsalapov	1880	1080	400	400		
7	CAN	Piper Gilles / Paul Poirier	1847	787	400	360	300	
8	ESP	Olivia Smart / Adrian Diaz	1767	638	324	292	270	243
9	GBR	Lilah Fear / Lewis Gibson	1739	709	324	213	250	243
10	CAN	Laurence Fournier Beaudry / Nikolaj Soerensen	1705	517	324	324	270	270
11	ESP	Sara Hurtado / Kirill Khaliavin	1521	496	292	292	243	198
12	RUS	Alexandra Stepanova / Ivan Bukin	1404	756	324	324		
13	LTU	Allison Reed / Saulius Ambrulevicius	1364	465	213	191	270	225
14	USA	Christina Carreira / Anthony Ponomarenko	1352	680	262	191	219	
15	JPN	Kana Muramoto / Daisuke Takahashi	1262	756	236		270	
16	CAN	Carolane Soucisse / Shane Firus	1236	612	213	213	198	
17	RUS	Diana Davis / Gleb Smolkin	1233	446	262		300	225
18	FIN	Juulia Turkkila / Matthias Versluis	1140	377	213		300	250
19	USA	Kaitlin Hawayek / Jean-Luc Baker	1136	574	262		300	
20	CAN	Marjorie Lajoie / Zachary Lagha	1135	418	262	236	219	
21	FRA	Evgeniia Lopareva / Geoffrey Brissaud	1115	362	292	236	225	
22	UKR	Oleksandra Nazarova / Maksym Nikitin	1036	325	191		270	250
23	USA	Oona Brown / Gage Brown	975	500	250	225		
24	GER	Katharina Mueller / Tim Dieck	950	264	191		270	225
25	CAN	Natalie D'Alessandro / Bruce Waddell	903	450	250	203		
26	USA	Katarina Wolfkostin / Jeffrey Chen	840	365	250	225		
27	CAN	Nadiia Bashynska / Peter Beaumont	790	405	203	182		
28	AUS	Holly Harris / Jason Chan	787	402			203	182
29	RUS	Anastasia Skoptcova / Kirill Aleshin	786		236		300	250
30	ARM	Tina Garabedian / Simon Proulx Senecal	780	305			250	225
31	GEO	Maria Kazakova / Georgy Reviya	768	275			250	243
32	USA	Emily Bratti / Ian Somerville	749	551			198	
33	CZE	Natalie Taschlerova / Filip Taschler	735	339			198	198
34	CHN	Shiyue Wang / Xinyu Liu	669	377	292			
35	KOR	Hannah Lim / Ye Quan	646	295	203	148		
36	USA	Angela Ling / Caleb Wein	633	266	203	164		
37	CAN	Haley Sales / Nikolas Wamsteeker	624	446			178	
37	GER	Darya Grimm / Michail Savitskiy	624	328	148	148		
39	GBR	Sasha Fear / George Waddell	611	222			225	164
40	FRA	Loicia Demougeot / Theo Le Mercier	579	173			203	203
41	CYP	Angelina Kudryavtseva / Ilia Karankevich	575	239	203	133		
42	HUN	Mariia Ignateva / Danijil Leonyidovics Szemko	568	140			225	203
43	NZL	Charlotte Lafond-Fournier / Richard Kang In Kam	544	362			182	
44	FRA	Eva Bernard / Tom Jochum	538	174	182	182		
45	FRA	Celina Fradji / Jean-Hans Fourneaux	512	215	164	133		
46	SUI	Jasmine Tessari / Stephane Walker	511	126			203	182
47	GER	Jennifer Janse Van Rensburg / Benjamin Steffan	500				250	250
47	RUS	Irina Khavronina / Dario Cirisano	500		250	250		
49	RUS	Annabelle Morozov / Andrei Bagin	498		262	236		
50	CAN	Marie-Jade Lauriault / Romain Le Gac	496	496				
51	EST	Solene Mazingue / Marko Jevgeni Gaidajenko	491	180	203	108		
52	AUS	India Nette / Eron Westwood	489	325			164	
53	FIN	Yuka Orihara / Juho Pirinen	475				250	225
53	FRA	Natacha Lagouge / Arnaud Caffa	475				250	225
53	RUS	Vasilisa Kaganovskaia / Valeriy Angelopol	475		250	225		
56	BLR	Viktoria Semenjuk / Ilya Yukhimuk	469				250	219
57	RUS	Elizaveta Shanaeva / Devid Naryzhnyy	462				243	219
58	RUS	Sofya Tyutyunina / Alexander Shustitskiy	453		250	203		
59	USA	Isabella Flores / Dimitry Tsarevski	450		225	225		
60	JPN	Misato Komatsubara / Tim Koleto	449		236	213		
61	RUS	Elizaveta Khudaiberdieva / Egor Bazin	434		191		243	
62	ITA	Carolina Moscheni / Francesco Fioretti	428				225	203
63	FRA	Marie Dupayage / Thomas Nabais	423				225	198
64	POL	Natalia Kaliszek / Maksym Spodyriev	413	222	191			
65	GBR	Phebe Bekker / James Hernandez	411	194	120	97		
66	AUS	Chantelle Kerry / Andrew Dodds	407				225	182
67	POL	Anastasia Polibina / Pavel Golovishnikov	385				203	182
68	FRA	Lou Terreaux / Noe Perron	381				203	178
68	USA	Molly Cesanek / Yehor Yehorov	381				203	178
70	POL	Olivia Oliver / Joshua Andari	368	127	133	108		
71	USA	Eva Pate / Logan Bye	367				203	164
72	CZE	Katerina Mrazkova / Daniel Mrazek	364		182	182		
73	EST	Tatjana Bunina / Ivan Kuznetsov	355	114	133	108		
74	UKR	Mariia Pinchuk / Mykyta Pogorielov	349	93	148	108		
75	RUS	Olga Mamchenkova / Mark Volkov	346		182	164		
75	RUS	Ekaterina Rybakova / Ivan Makhnonosov	346		182	164		
77	UKR	Mariia Holubtsova / Kyryl Bielobrov	338	156			182	
78	ITA	Victoria Manni / Carlo Roethlisberger	328				164	164
79	BLR	Ekaterina Andreeva / Ivan Desyatov	297		164	133		
80	USA	Leah Neset / Artem Markelov	284		164	120		
81	ITA	Nicole Calderari / Marco Cilli	253		133	120		
82	KAZ	Sofiya Lukinskaya / Danil Pak	240		120	120		
83	CAN	Miku Makita / Tyler Gunara	225		225			
83	RUS	Sofia Leonteva / Daniil Gorelkin	225		225			
83	RUS	Ekaterina Mironova / Evgenii Ustenko	225				225	
86	CAN	Hailey Yu / Brendan Giang	217		120	97		
87	EST	Aleksandra Samersova / Kevin Ojala	203				203	
87	ISR	Mariia Nosovitskaya / Mikhail Nosovitskiy	203				203	
89	ITA	Giorgia Galimberti / Matteo Libasse Mandelli	200	103	97			
90	CAN	Alicia Fabbri / Paul Ayer	198				198	
91	SUI	Kayleigh Maksymec / Maximilien Rahier	183	75	108			
92	GER	Lara Luft / Maximilian Pfisterer	182				182	
92	ISR	Shira Ichilov / Volodymyr Byelikov	182				182	
92	LAT	Aurelija Ipolito / Luke Russell	182				182	
92	LTU	Paulina Ramanauskaite / Deividas Kizala	182				182	
92	KOR	Yura Min / Daniel Eaton	182				182	
92	UKR	Anastasiia Sammel / Danylo Yefremenko	182				182	
98	HUN	Anna Yanovskaya / Adam Lukacs	178				178	
99	BLR	Karina Sidarenka / Maksim Yalenich	164				164	
99	GER	Anne-Marie Wolf / Max Liebers	164				164	
99	RUS	Sofiia Kachushkina / Oleg Muratov	164		164			
99	SVK	Maria Sofia Pucherova / Nikita Lysak	164				164	
99	USA	Lorraine McNamara / Anton Spiridonov	164				164	
104	JPN	Nao Kida / Masaya Morita	157	157				
105	ITA	Noemi Maria Tali / Stefano Frasca	148		148			
105	RUS	Margarita Svistunova / Dmitrii Studenikin	148		148			
105	ESP	Sofia Val / Nikita Vitryanyuk	148		148			
108	ISR	Elizabeth Tkachenko / Alexei Kiliakov	141	141				
109	CAN	Alyssa Robinson / Jacob Portz	133		133			
110	CAN	Chaima Ben Khelifa / Everest Zhu	120		120			
111	FRA	Louise Bordet / Thomas Gipoulou	108		108			
111	RUS	Elizaveta Shichina / Gordey Khubulov	108		108			
113	CZE	Denisa Cimlova / Vilem Hlavsa	97		97			
113	FRA	Lou Koch / Ivan Melnyk	97		97			
113	GER	Karla Maria Karl / Kai Hoferichter	97		97			
113	UKR	Lika Bondar / Artem Koval	97		97			
117	SVK	Anna Simova / Kirill Aksenov	83	83				
118	GEO	Yulia Lebedeva-Bitadze / Dmitri Parkhomenko	68	68				

== World Standings and Season's World Ranking for synchronized skating ==
=== Season-end World Standings ===
==== Senior ====
As of May 30, 2022.

Rank	Nation	Name	Points	Season	ISU World Championships	International Competition	
Rank	Nation	Name	Points	Season	Best	Best	2nd Best
1	FIN	Team Helsinki Rockettes	1938	2021/2022 (100%)	680	420	250
1	FIN	Team Helsinki Rockettes	1938	2020/2021 (100%)			
1	FIN	Team Helsinki Rockettes	1938	2019/2020 (70%)		294	294
2	FIN	Team Marigold Ice Unity	1511	2021/2022 (100%)	756	225	
2	FIN	Team Marigold Ice Unity	1511	2020/2021 (100%)			
2	FIN	Team Marigold Ice Unity	1511	2019/2020 (70%)		265	265
3	CAN	Team Les Supremes	1316	2021/2022 (100%)	840		
3	CAN	Team Les Supremes	1316	2020/2021 (100%)			
3	CAN	Team Les Supremes	1316	2019/2020 (70%)		238	238
4	FRA	Team Zoulous	1224	2021/2022 (100%)	264	340	306
4	FRA	Team Zoulous	1224	2020/2021 (100%)			
4	FRA	Team Zoulous	1224	2019/2020 (70%)		158	156
5	RUS	Team Paradise	1178	2021/2022 (100%)		420	250
5	RUS	Team Paradise	1178	2020/2021 (100%)			
5	RUS	Team Paradise	1178	2019/2020 (70%)		294	214
6	RUS	Team Crystal Ice Senior	1169	2021/2022 (100%)		378	378
6	RUS	Team Crystal Ice Senior	1169	2020/2021 (100%)			
6	RUS	Team Crystal Ice Senior	1169	2019/2020 (70%)		238	175
7	HUN	Team Passion	1162	2021/2022 (100%)	402	340	306
7	HUN	Team Passion	1162	2020/2021 (100%)			
7	HUN	Team Passion	1162	2019/2020 (70%)		114	
8	CAN	Team Nexxice	1024	2021/2022 (100%)	612		
8	CAN	Team Nexxice	1024	2020/2021 (100%)			
8	CAN	Team Nexxice	1024	2019/2020 (70%)		238	174
9	USA	Team Haydenettes	1009	2021/2022 (100%)	551		
9	USA	Team Haydenettes	1009	2020/2021 (100%)			
9	USA	Team Haydenettes	1009	2019/2020 (70%)		265	193
10	GER	Team Berlin 1	992	2021/2022 (100%)	446	250	182
10	GER	Team Berlin 1	992	2020/2021 (100%)			
10	GER	Team Berlin 1	992	2019/2020 (70%)		114	
11	FIN	Team Unique	987	2021/2022 (100%)		225	203
11	FIN	Team Unique	987	2020/2021 (100%)			
11	FIN	Team Unique	987	2019/2020 (70%)		294	265
12	SUI	Team Starlight Elite	908	2021/2022 (100%)	214	276	164
12	SUI	Team Starlight Elite	908	2020/2021 (100%)			
12	SUI	Team Starlight Elite	908	2019/2020 (70%)		127	127
13	NED	Team Ice United	827	2021/2022 (100%)	126	276	248
13	NED	Team Ice United	827	2020/2021 (100%)			
13	NED	Team Ice United	827	2019/2020 (70%)		93	84
14	USA	Team Miami University	826	2021/2022 (100%)	496		
14	USA	Team Miami University	826	2020/2021 (100%)			
14	USA	Team Miami University	826	2019/2020 (70%)		174	156
15	USA	Team Skyliners	764	2021/2022 (100%)		378	
15	USA	Team Skyliners	764	2020/2021 (100%)			
15	USA	Team Skyliners	764	2019/2020 (70%)		193	193
16	GER	Team United Angels	707	2021/2022 (100%)		248	203
16	GER	Team United Angels	707	2020/2021 (100%)			
16	GER	Team United Angels	707	2019/2020 (70%)		141	115
17	RUS	Team Tatarstan	634	2021/2022 (100%)		420	
17	RUS	Team Tatarstan	634	2020/2021 (100%)			
17	RUS	Team Tatarstan	634	2019/2020 (70%)		214	
18	ITA	Team Hot Shivers	591	2021/2022 (100%)	293		
18	ITA	Team Hot Shivers	591	2020/2021 (100%)			
18	ITA	Team Hot Shivers	591	2019/2020 (70%)		156	142
19	GER	Team Skating Graces	590	2021/2022 (100%)		306	
19	GER	Team Skating Graces	590	2020/2021 (100%)			
19	GER	Team Skating Graces	590	2019/2020 (70%)		142	142
20	CZE	Team Olympia	587	2021/2022 (100%)	362	225	
20	CZE	Team Olympia	587	2020/2021 (100%)			
20	CZE	Team Olympia	587	2019/2020 (70%)			
21	ITA	Team Ice on Fire	546	2021/2022 (100%)	237	182	
21	ITA	Team Ice on Fire	546	2020/2021 (100%)			
21	ITA	Team Ice on Fire	546	2019/2020 (70%)		127	
22	FIN	Team Dream Edges Senior	522	2021/2022 (100%)		340	182
22	FIN	Team Dream Edges Senior	522	2020/2021 (100%)			
22	FIN	Team Dream Edges Senior	522	2019/2020 (70%)			
23	USA	Team Adrian College	480	2021/2022 (100%)		164	
23	USA	Team Adrian College	480	2020/2021 (100%)			
23	USA	Team Adrian College	480	2019/2020 (70%)		158	158
24	POL	Team Ice Fire Senior	449	2021/2022 (100%)	173	276	
24	POL	Team Ice Fire Senior	449	2020/2021 (100%)			
24	POL	Team Ice Fire Senior	449	2019/2020 (70%)			
25	NED	Team Illumination	437	2021/2022 (100%)		164	
25	NED	Team Illumination	437	2020/2021 (100%)			
25	NED	Team Illumination	437	2019/2020 (70%)		158	115
26	ESP	Team Fusion	416	2021/2022 (100%)	156	133	
26	ESP	Team Fusion	416	2020/2021 (100%)			
26	ESP	Team Fusion	416	2019/2020 (70%)		127	
27	CAN	Team Nova Senior	407	2021/2022 (100%)			
27	CAN	Team Nova Senior	407	2020/2021 (100%)			
27	CAN	Team Nova Senior	407	2019/2020 (70%)		214	193
28	FIN	Team Lumineers Senior	388	2021/2022 (100%)			
28	FIN	Team Lumineers Senior	388	2020/2021 (100%)			
28	FIN	Team Lumineers Senior	388	2019/2020 (70%)		214	174
29	GBR	Team Icicles Senior	367	2021/2022 (100%)	113		
29	GBR	Team Icicles Senior	367	2020/2021 (100%)			
29	GBR	Team Icicles Senior	367	2019/2020 (70%)		127	127
30	BEL	Team Phoenix	359	2021/2022 (100%)	102		
30	BEL	Team Phoenix	359	2020/2021 (100%)			
30	BEL	Team Phoenix	359	2019/2020 (70%)		142	115
31	JPN	Team Jingu Ice Messengers	333	2021/2022 (100%)	192		
31	JPN	Team Jingu Ice Messengers	333	2020/2021 (100%)			
31	JPN	Team Jingu Ice Messengers	333	2019/2020 (70%)		141	
32	SWE	Team Inspire	325	2021/2022 (100%)	325		
32	SWE	Team Inspire	325	2020/2021 (100%)			
32	SWE	Team Inspire	325	2019/2020 (70%)			
33	USA	Team Crystallettes	315	2021/2022 (100%)			
33	USA	Team Crystallettes	315	2020/2021 (100%)			
33	USA	Team Crystallettes	315	2019/2020 (70%)		174	141
34	CZE	Team Darlings	290	2021/2022 (100%)		148	
34	CZE	Team Darlings	290	2020/2021 (100%)			
34	CZE	Team Darlings	290	2019/2020 (70%)		142	
35	AUS	Team Ice Storm	260	2021/2022 (100%)			
35	AUS	Team Ice Storm	260	2020/2021 (100%)			
35	AUS	Team Ice Storm	260	2019/2020 (70%)		156	104
36	GBR	Team Zariba	208	2021/2022 (100%)			
36	GBR	Team Zariba	208	2020/2021 (100%)			
36	GBR	Team Zariba	208	2019/2020 (70%)		115	93
37	CRO	Team Zagreb Snowflakes	207	2021/2022 (100%)	92		
37	CRO	Team Zagreb Snowflakes	207	2020/2021 (100%)			
37	CRO	Team Zagreb Snowflakes	207	2019/2020 (70%)		115	
38	RUS	Team Junost Senior	203	2021/2022 (100%)		203	
38	RUS	Team Junost Senior	203	2020/2021 (100%)			
38	RUS	Team Junost Senior	203	2019/2020 (70%)			
39	AUS	Team Unity	140	2021/2022 (100%)	140		
39	AUS	Team Unity	140	2020/2021 (100%)			
39	AUS	Team Unity	140	2019/2020 (70%)			
40	AUT	Team Sweet Mozart	104	2021/2022 (100%)			
40	AUT	Team Sweet Mozart	104	2020/2021 (100%)			
40	AUT	Team Sweet Mozart	104	2019/2020 (70%)		104	
41	LAT	Team Amber	84	2021/2022 (100%)			
41	LAT	Team Amber	84	2020/2021 (100%)			
41	LAT	Team Amber	84	2019/2020 (70%)		84	
42	TUR	Team Vizyon	83	2021/2022 (100%)	83		
42	TUR	Team Vizyon	83	2020/2021 (100%)			
42	TUR	Team Vizyon	83	2019/2020 (70%)			

==== Junior ====
As of May 30, 2022.

Rank	Nation	Name	Points	Season	ISU World Championships	International Competition	
Rank	Nation	Name	Points	Season	Best	Best	2nd Best
1	FIN	Team Fintastic Junior	1492	2021/2022 (100%)	600	162	
1	FIN	Team Fintastic Junior	1492	2020/2021 (100%)			
1	FIN	Team Fintastic Junior	1492	2019/2020 (70%)	420	170	140
2	USA	Teams Elite Junior	1356	2021/2022 (100%)	486	300	243
2	USA	Teams Elite Junior	1356	2020/2021 (100%)			
2	USA	Teams Elite Junior	1356	2019/2020 (70%)		189	138
3	RUS	Team Crystal Ice Junior	1129	2021/2022 (100%)		300	300
3	RUS	Team Crystal Ice Junior	1129	2020/2021 (100%)			
3	RUS	Team Crystal Ice Junior	1129	2019/2020 (70%)	340	189	
4	USA	Team Skyliners Junior	1082	2021/2022 (100%)	540	200	
4	USA	Team Skyliners Junior	1082	2020/2021 (100%)			
4	USA	Team Skyliners Junior	1082	2019/2020 (70%)		189	153
5	POL	Team Ice Fire Junior	1043	2021/2022 (100%)	258	243	197
5	POL	Team Ice Fire Junior	1043	2020/2021 (100%)			
5	POL	Team Ice Fire Junior	1043	2019/2020 (70%)	181	83	81
6	RUS	Team Junost Junior	998	2021/2022 (100%)		200	
6	RUS	Team Junost Junior	998	2020/2021 (100%)			
6	RUS	Team Junost Junior	998	2019/2020 (70%)	378	210	210
7	FIN	Team Musketeers Junior	947	2021/2022 (100%)	437	200	
7	FIN	Team Musketeers Junior	947	2020/2021 (100%)			
7	FIN	Team Musketeers Junior	947	2019/2020 (70%)		170	140
8	CAN	Team Nexxice Junior	924	2021/2022 (100%)	354		
8	CAN	Team Nexxice Junior	924	2020/2021 (100%)			
8	CAN	Team Nexxice Junior	924	2019/2020 (70%)	276	170	124
9	CAN	Team Les Supremes Junior	866	2021/2022 (100%)	394		
9	CAN	Team Les Supremes Junior	866	2020/2021 (100%)			
9	CAN	Team Les Supremes Junior	866	2019/2020 (70%)	248	113	111
10	FIN	Team Mystique Junior	802	2021/2022 (100%)		146	
10	FIN	Team Mystique Junior	802	2020/2021 (100%)			
10	FIN	Team Mystique Junior	802	2019/2020 (70%)	306	210	140
11	SWE	Team Spirit Junior	742	2021/2022 (100%)	319		
11	SWE	Team Spirit Junior	742	2020/2021 (100%)			
11	SWE	Team Spirit Junior	742	2019/2020 (70%)	223	100	100
12	SWE	Team Seaside Junior	702	2021/2022 (100%)	287		
12	SWE	Team Seaside Junior	702	2020/2021 (100%)			
12	SWE	Team Seaside Junior	702	2019/2020 (70%)	201	124	90
13	FRA	Team Zazou Junior	699	2021/2022 (100%)	188	177	177
13	FRA	Team Zazou Junior	699	2020/2021 (100%)			
13	FRA	Team Zazou Junior	699	2019/2020 (70%)		90	67
14	SUI	Team Cool Dreams Junior	671	2021/2022 (100%)	209	243	219
14	SUI	Team Cool Dreams Junior	671	2020/2021 (100%)			
14	SUI	Team Cool Dreams Junior	671	2019/2020 (70%)			
15	FIN	Team Dream Edges Junior	551	2021/2022 (100%)		270	
15	FIN	Team Dream Edges Junior	551	2020/2021 (100%)			
15	FIN	Team Dream Edges Junior	551	2019/2020 (70%)		189	92
16	SUI	Team Starlight Junior	546	2021/2022 (100%)		197	197
16	SUI	Team Starlight Junior	546	2020/2021 (100%)			
16	SUI	Team Starlight Junior	546	2019/2020 (70%)	78	74	
17	FIN	Team Valley Bay Synchro Junior	534	2021/2022 (100%)		270	
17	FIN	Team Valley Bay Synchro Junior	534	2020/2021 (100%)			
17	FIN	Team Valley Bay Synchro Junior	534	2019/2020 (70%)		138	126
18	CZE	Team Harmonia Junior	519	2021/2022 (100%)	153	146	
18	CZE	Team Harmonia Junior	519	2020/2021 (100%)			
18	CZE	Team Harmonia Junior	519	2019/2020 (70%)	146	74	
19	POL	Team Le Soleil Junior	515	2021/2022 (100%)	137	219	159
19	POL	Team Le Soleil Junior	515	2020/2021 (100%)			
19	POL	Team Le Soleil Junior	515	2019/2020 (70%)			
19	USA	Team Lexettes Junior	515	2021/2022 (100%)		219	
19	USA	Team Lexettes Junior	515	2020/2021 (100%)			
19	USA	Team Lexettes Junior	515	2019/2020 (70%)		170	126
21	USA	Team Starlights Junior	468	2021/2022 (100%)		162	
21	USA	Team Starlights Junior	468	2020/2021 (100%)			
21	USA	Team Starlights Junior	468	2019/2020 (70%)		153	153
22	ITA	Team Hot Shivers Junior	445	2021/2022 (100%)	232		
22	ITA	Team Hot Shivers Junior	445	2020/2021 (100%)			
22	ITA	Team Hot Shivers Junior	445	2019/2020 (70%)		111	102
23	HUN	Team Magic Junior	407	2021/2022 (100%)	169	106	
23	HUN	Team Magic Junior	407	2020/2021 (100%)			
23	HUN	Team Magic Junior	407	2019/2020 (70%)	132		
24	RUS	Team Sunrise 1 Junior	390	2021/2022 (100%)		180	
24	RUS	Team Sunrise 1 Junior	390	2020/2021 (100%)			
24	RUS	Team Sunrise 1 Junior	390	2019/2020 (70%)		210	
25	NED	Team Illuminettes Junior	384	2021/2022 (100%)	111	177	
25	NED	Team Illuminettes Junior	384	2020/2021 (100%)			
25	NED	Team Illuminettes Junior	384	2019/2020 (70%)	96		
26	USA	Team Image Junior	383	2021/2022 (100%)		270	
26	USA	Team Image Junior	383	2020/2021 (100%)			
26	USA	Team Image Junior	383	2019/2020 (70%)		113	
27	GBR	Team Icicles Junior	369	2021/2022 (100%)	124		
27	GBR	Team Icicles Junior	369	2020/2021 (100%)			
27	GBR	Team Icicles Junior	369	2019/2020 (70%)	162	83	
28	AUS	Team Iceskateers Elite Junior	322	2021/2022 (100%)	66		
28	AUS	Team Iceskateers Elite Junior	322	2020/2021 (100%)			
28	AUS	Team Iceskateers Elite Junior	322	2019/2020 (70%)	118	138	
29	USA	Team Fond du Lac Blades Junior	273	2021/2022 (100%)		162	
29	USA	Team Fond du Lac Blades Junior	273	2020/2021 (100%)			
29	USA	Team Fond du Lac Blades Junior	273	2019/2020 (70%)		111	
30	USA	Team DC EDGE Junior	259	2021/2022 (100%)		146	
30	USA	Team DC EDGE Junior	259	2020/2021 (100%)			
30	USA	Team DC EDGE Junior	259	2019/2020 (70%)		113	
31	CAN	Team Gold Ice Junior	233	2021/2022 (100%)		131	
31	CAN	Team Gold Ice Junior	233	2020/2021 (100%)			
31	CAN	Team Gold Ice Junior	233	2019/2020 (70%)		102	
32	AUT	Team Colibris Vienna Junior	199	2021/2022 (100%)	81	118	
32	AUT	Team Colibris Vienna Junior	199	2020/2021 (100%)			
32	AUT	Team Colibris Vienna Junior	199	2019/2020 (70%)			
33	CZE	Team Kometa Junior	198	2021/2022 (100%)		131	
33	CZE	Team Kometa Junior	198	2020/2021 (100%)			
33	CZE	Team Kometa Junior	198	2019/2020 (70%)		67	
34	FRA	Team Jeanne D'Arc Junior	182	2021/2022 (100%)			
34	FRA	Team Jeanne D'Arc Junior	182	2020/2021 (100%)			
34	FRA	Team Jeanne D'Arc Junior	182	2019/2020 (70%)		92	90
35	USA	Team Hockettes Junior	180	2021/2022 (100%)		180	
35	USA	Team Hockettes Junior	180	2020/2021 (100%)			
35	USA	Team Hockettes Junior	180	2019/2020 (70%)			
35	USA	Team Northernettes Junior	180	2021/2022 (100%)		180	
35	USA	Team Northernettes Junior	180	2020/2021 (100%)			
35	USA	Team Northernettes Junior	180	2019/2020 (70%)			
37	ESP	Team Mirum Junior	167	2021/2022 (100%)	100		
37	ESP	Team Mirum Junior	167	2020/2021 (100%)			
37	ESP	Team Mirum Junior	167	2019/2020 (70%)		67	
38	CRO	Team Zagreb Snowflakes Junior	160	2021/2022 (100%)	73		
38	CRO	Team Zagreb Snowflakes Junior	160	2020/2021 (100%)			
38	CRO	Team Zagreb Snowflakes Junior	160	2019/2020 (70%)	87		
39	FRA	Team Black Diam's Junior	159	2021/2022 (100%)		159	
39	FRA	Team Black Diam's Junior	159	2020/2021 (100%)			
39	FRA	Team Black Diam's Junior	159	2019/2020 (70%)			
40	FRA	Team Chrysalides Junior	155	2021/2022 (100%)			
40	FRA	Team Chrysalides Junior	155	2020/2021 (100%)			
40	FRA	Team Chrysalides Junior	155	2019/2020 (70%)		81	74
41	FIN	Team Fireblades Junior	153	2021/2022 (100%)			
41	FIN	Team Fireblades Junior	153	2020/2021 (100%)			
41	FIN	Team Fireblades Junior	153	2019/2020 (70%)		153	
42	FIN	Team Stella Polaris Junior	138	2021/2022 (100%)			
42	FIN	Team Stella Polaris Junior	138	2020/2021 (100%)			
42	FIN	Team Stella Polaris Junior	138	2019/2020 (70%)		138	
43	FIN	Team Ice Steps Junior	126	2021/2022 (100%)			
43	FIN	Team Ice Steps Junior	126	2020/2021 (100%)			
43	FIN	Team Ice Steps Junior	126	2019/2020 (70%)		126	
44	CAN	Team Nova Juniors	124	2021/2022 (100%)			
44	CAN	Team Nova Juniors	124	2020/2021 (100%)			
44	CAN	Team Nova Juniors	124	2019/2020 (70%)		124	
45	FIN	Team Reflections Junior	113	2021/2022 (100%)			
45	FIN	Team Reflections Junior	113	2020/2021 (100%)			
45	FIN	Team Reflections Junior	113	2019/2020 (70%)		113	
46	GER	Team Berlin Junior	107	2021/2022 (100%)			
46	GER	Team Berlin Junior	107	2020/2021 (100%)			
46	GER	Team Berlin Junior	107	2019/2020 (70%)	107		
47	CZE	Team Gemini Junior	106	2021/2022 (100%)		106	
47	CZE	Team Gemini Junior	106	2020/2021 (100%)			
47	CZE	Team Gemini Junior	106	2019/2020 (70%)			
48	FIN	Team Ice Infinity Junior	102	2021/2022 (100%)			
48	FIN	Team Ice Infinity Junior	102	2020/2021 (100%)			
48	FIN	Team Ice Infinity Junior	102	2019/2020 (70%)		102	
48	RUS	Team Zhemchuzhina Junior	102	2021/2022 (100%)			
48	RUS	Team Zhemchuzhina Junior	102	2020/2021 (100%)			
48	RUS	Team Zhemchuzhina Junior	102	2019/2020 (70%)		102	
50	HUN	Team UTE Synchro Junior	96	2021/2022 (100%)		96	
50	HUN	Team UTE Synchro Junior	96	2020/2021 (100%)			
50	HUN	Team UTE Synchro Junior	96	2019/2020 (70%)			
51	FIN	Team Estreija Junior	92	2021/2022 (100%)			
51	FIN	Team Estreija Junior	92	2020/2021 (100%)			
51	FIN	Team Estreija Junior	92	2019/2020 (70%)		92	
51	FIN	Team Sun City Swing Junior	92	2021/2022 (100%)			
51	FIN	Team Sun City Swing Junior	92	2020/2021 (100%)			
51	FIN	Team Sun City Swing Junior	92	2019/2020 (70%)		92	
53	GER	Team Skating Graces Junior	90	2021/2022 (100%)	90		
53	GER	Team Skating Graces Junior	90	2020/2021 (100%)			
53	GER	Team Skating Graces Junior	90	2019/2020 (70%)			
54	ITA	Team Shining Blades Junior	83	2021/2022 (100%)			
54	ITA	Team Shining Blades Junior	83	2020/2021 (100%)			
54	ITA	Team Shining Blades Junior	83	2019/2020 (70%)		83	
55	TUR	Team Amorice Junior	70	2021/2022 (100%)			
55	TUR	Team Amorice Junior	70	2020/2021 (100%)			
55	TUR	Team Amorice Junior	70	2019/2020 (70%)	70		
56	GBR	Team Solway Stars Junior	67	2021/2022 (100%)			
56	GBR	Team Solway Stars Junior	67	2020/2021 (100%)			
56	GBR	Team Solway Stars Junior	67	2019/2020 (70%)		67	
57	TUR	Team Golden Roses Junior	59	2021/2022 (100%)	59		
57	TUR	Team Golden Roses Junior	59	2020/2021 (100%)			
57	TUR	Team Golden Roses Junior	59	2019/2020 (70%)			

=== Season's World Ranking ===
==== Senior ====
As of May 30, 2022.

Rank	Nation	Name	Points	ISU World Championships	International Competition	
Rank	Nation	Name	Points	Best	Best	2nd Best
1	FIN	Team Helsinki Rockettes	1350	680	420	250
2	HUN	Team Passion	1048	402	340	306
3	FIN	Team Marigold Ice Unity	981	756	225	
4	FRA	Team Zoulous	910	264	340	306
5	GER	Team Berlin 1	878	446	250	182
6	CAN	Team Les Supremes	840	840		
7	RUS	Team Crystal Ice Senior	756		378	378
8	RUS	Team Paradise	670		420	250
9	SUI	Team Starlight Elite	654	214	276	164
10	NED	Team Ice United	650	126	276	248
11	CAN	Team Nexxice	612	612		
12	CZE	Team Olympia	587	362	225	
13	USA	Team Haydenettes	551	551		
14	FIN	Team Dream Edges Senior	522		340	182
15	USA	Team Miami University	496	496		
16	GER	Team United Angels	451		248	203
17	POL	Team Ice Fire Senior	449	173	276	
18	FIN	Team Unique	428		225	203
19	RUS	Team Tatarstan	420		420	
20	ITA	Team Ice on Fire	419	237	182	
21	USA	Team Skyliners	378		378	
22	SWE	Team Inspire	325	325		
23	GER	Team Skating Graces	306		306	
24	ITA	Team Hot Shivers	293	293		
25	ESP	Team Fusion	289	156	133	
26	RUS	Team Junost Senior	203		203	
27	JPN	Team Jingu Ice Messengers	192	192		
28	NED	Team Illumination	164		164	
28	USA	Team Adrian College	164		164	
30	CZE	Team Darlings	148		148	
31	AUS	Team Unity	140	140		
32	GBR	Team Icicles Senior	113	113		
33	BEL	Team Phoenix	102	102		
34	CRO	Team Zagreb Snowflakes	92	92		
35	TUR	Team Vizyon	83	83		

==== Junior ====
As of May 30, 2022.

Rank	Nation	Name	Points	ISU World Championships	International Competition	
Rank	Nation	Name	Points	Best	Best	2nd Best
1	USA	Teams Elite Junior	1029	486	300	243
2	FIN	Team Fintastic Junior	762	600	162	
3	USA	Team Skyliners Junior	740	540	200	
4	POL	Team Ice Fire Junior	698	258	243	197
5	SUI	Team Cool Dreams Junior	671	209	243	219
6	FIN	Team Musketeers Junior	637	437	200	
7	RUS	Team Crystal Ice Junior	600		300	300
8	FRA	Team Zazou Junior	542	188	177	177
9	POL	Team Le Soleil Junior	515	137	219	159
10	CAN	Team Les Supremes Junior	394	394		
10	SUI	Team Starlight Junior	394		197	197
12	CAN	Team Nexxice Junior	354	354		
13	SWE	Team Spirit Junior	319	319		
14	CZE	Team Harmonia Junior	299	153	146	
15	NED	Team Illuminettes Junior	288	111	177	
16	SWE	Team Seaside Junior	287	287		
17	HUN	Team Magic Junior	275	169	106	
18	FIN	Team Dream Edges Junior	270		270	
18	FIN	Team Valley Bay Synchro Junior	270		270	
18	USA	Team Image Junior	270		270	
21	ITA	Team Hot Shivers Junior	232	232		
22	USA	Team Lexettes Junior	219		219	
23	RUS	Team Junost Junior	200		200	
24	AUT	Team Colibris Vienna Junior	199	81	118	
25	RUS	Team Sunrise 1 Junior	180		180	
25	USA	Team Hockettes Junior	180		180	
25	USA	Team Northernettes Junior	180		180	
28	USA	Team Fond du Lac Blades Junior	162		162	
28	USA	Team Starlight Junior	162		162	
30	FRA	Team Black Diam's Junior	159		159	
31	FIN	Team Mystique Junior	146		146	
31	USA	Team DC EDGE Junior	146		146	
33	CAN	Team Gold Ice Junior	131		131	
33	CZE	Team Kometa Junior	131		131	
35	GBR	Team Icicles Junior	124	124		
36	CZE	Team Gemini Junior	106		106	
37	ESP	Team Mirum Junior	100	100		
38	HUN	Team UTE Synchro Junior	96		96	
39	GER	Team Skating Graces Junior	90	90		
40	CRO	Team Zagreb Snowflakes Junior	73	73		
41	AUS	Team Iceskateers Elite Junior	66	66		
42	TUR	Team Golden Roses Junior	59	59		

== See also ==
- ISU World Standings
- ISU Season's World Ranking
- 2021–22 figure skating season
