= 2019 CS Ice Star =

Figure skating competition

- Type: ISU Challenger Series
- Date: October 18 – 20
- Season: 2019–20
- Location: Minsk, Belarus
- Host: Skating Union of Belarus
- Venue: Minsk Arena

Champions
- Men's singles: (Italy) Daniel Grassl
- Ladies' singles: (Russia) Sofia Samodurova
- Ice dance: (Spain) Sara Hurtado / Kirill Khaliavin
- Previous: 2019 CS Finlandia Trophy
- Next: 2019 CS Asian Open Trophy

The 2019 CS Ice Star was held in October 2019 in Minsk, Belarus. It was part of the 2019–20 ISU Challenger Series. Medals were awarded in the disciplines of men's singles, ladies' singles, and ice dance.

== Entries ==
The International Skating Union published the list of entries on September 24, 2019.

Country	Men	Ladies	Ice dance
Armenia		Valeriia Sidorova	
Austria	Luc Maierhofer		
Azerbaijan		Ekaterina Ryabova	
Belarus	Alexander Lebedev; Yakau Zenko	Aliaksandra Chepeleva; Arina Gall-Savalskaya; Lizaveta Khlypauka; Katsiarina Pakhamovich; Maryia Saldakayeva	Emiliya Kalehanova / Uladzislau Palkhouski
Estonia	Aleksandr Selevko; Mihhail Selevko	Gerli Liinamäe; Kristina Shkuleta-Gromova	
Finland		Oona Ounasvuori; Vera Stolt	
France	Landry Le May; Adam Siao Him Fa; Adrien Tesson	Léa Serna	Lila-Maya Seclet Monchot / Renan Manceau; Julia Wagret / Pierre Souquet
Germany		Lutricia Bock	Katharina Müller / Tim Dieck; Amanda Peterson / Maximilian Pfisterer
Israel		Alina Iushchenkova	
Italy	Mattia Dalla Torre; Daniel Grassl	Lucrezia Gennaro; Marina Piredda; Alessia Tornaghi	
Latvia		Angelīna Kučvaļska; Anete Lace	
Lithuania		Aleksandra Golovkina; Elžbieta Kropa	
Philippines	Edrian Paul Celestino	Cirinia Gillett	
Poland		Elżbieta Gabryszak	Natalia Kaliszek / Maksym Spodyriev
Russia	Artem Kovalev	Sofia Samodurova	Annabelle Morozov / Andrei Bagin
South Korea		Kim Ha-nul	
Spain			Sara Hurtado / Kirill Khaliavin
Sweden		Matilda Algotsson; Josefin Taljegård	
Switzerland			Arianna Wroblewska / Stéphane Walker
Turkey			Nicole Kelly / Berk Akalın
Ukraine		Miriam Abdulkarimova	Alexandra Nazarova / Maxim Nikitin

=== Changes to preliminary assignments ===
Date	Discipline	Withdrew	Added	Reason/Other notes	Refs
October 2	Men	(Poland) Krzystof Gala			
October 2	Ice dance	(Finland) Juulia Turkkila / Matthias Versluis		Injury (Turkkila)	
October 6	Ladies	(Estonia) Annely Vahi			
October 7	Men	(Israel) Alexei Bychenko			
October 7	Men	(Russia) Evgeniy Ilyin			
October 11	Men	(Azerbaijan) Vladimir Litvintsev			
October 11	Ladies	(Lithuania) Paulina Ramanauskaitė			
October 11	Ice dance	(Italy) Chiara Calderone / Pietro Papetti			
October 15	Men	(Sweden) Nikolaj Majorov			
October 15	Ladies	(Armenia) Marina Asoyan			
October 16	Men	(Germany) Thomas Stoll			
October 16	Ladies	(France) Laurine Lecavelier			
October 17	Men	(Russia) Sergei Voronov			
October 17	Ladies	(Israel) Alina Soupian			
October 17	Ice dance	(Russia) Anastasia Skoptcova / Kirill Aleshin			

== Results ==
=== Men ===
Rank	Name	Nation	Total points	SP		FS	
1	Daniel Grassl	Italy	243.82	1	85.42	1	158.40
2	Artem Kovalev	Russia	222.07	2	74.92	3	147.15
3	Adam Siao Him Fa	France	215.57	4	66.48	2	149.09
4	Aleksandr Selevko	Estonia	209.07	3	74.39	5	134.68
5	Mihhail Selevko	Estonia	197.62	10	58.69	4	138.93
6	Luc Maierhofer	Austria	186.58	7	63.80	6	122.78
7	Adrien Tesson	France	184.31	5	64.97	7	119.34
8	Edrian Paul Celestino	Philippines	182.27	6	64.61	9	117.66
9	Alexander Lebedev	Belarus	181.05	9	61.89	8	119.16
10	Yakau Zenko	Belarus	165.65	12	54.36	10	111.29
11	Landry Le May	France	164.76	11	57.41	11	107.35
12	Mattia Dalla Torre	Italy	160.26	8	62.84	12	97.42

=== Ladies ===
Rank	Name	Nation	Total points	SP		FS	
1	Sofia Samodurova	Russia	187.16	1	62.23	1	124.93
2	Kim Ha-nul	South Korea	178.82	4	53.93	2	124.89
3	Ekaterina Ryabova	Azerbaijan	166.41	2	58.39	3	108.02
4	Alessia Tornaghi	Italy	153.16	12	47.73	4	105.43
5	Angelīna Kučvaļska	Latvia	150.86	8	51.57	5	99.29
6	Josefin Taljegård	Sweden	146.60	9	51.47	6	95.13
7	Marina Piredda	Italy	145.58	6	52.25	7	93.33
8	Matilda Algotsson	Sweden	142.01	3	55.46	12	86.55
9	Aleksandra Golovkina	Lithuania	141.49	7	51.73	8	89.76
10	Oona Ounasvouri	Finland	137.18	10	49.43	9	87.75
11	Gerli Liinamäe	Estonia	136.39	11	49.00	11	87.39
12	Léa Serna	France	134.58	5	53.75	16	80.83
13	Alina Iuschenkova	Israel	130.91	17	43.31	10	87.60
14	Lucrezia Gennaro	Italy	126.99	13	47.60	18	79.39
15	Vera Stolt	Finland	126.90	18	42.94	13	83.96
16	Anete Lace	Latvia	125.71	16	43.63	14	82.08
17	Kristina Shkuleta-Gromova	Estonia	122.23	19	42.67	17	79.56
18	Elżbieta Gabryszak	Poland	121.95	14	45.27	21	76.68
19	Lutricia Bock	Germany	121.54	23	40.15	15	81.39
20	Arina Gall-Savalskaya	Belarus	117.91	20	40.97	19	76.94
21	Elžbieta Kropa	Lithuania	116.50	24	39.79	20	76.71
22	Valeriia Sidorova	Armenia	114.71	21	40.56	22	74.15
23	Aliaksandra Chepeleva	Belarus	111.91	15	44.68	24	67.23
24	Katsiarina Pakhamovich	Belarus	110.12	22	40.19	23	69.93
25	Lizaveta Khlypauka	Belarus	97.89	25	31.56	25	66.33
26	Miriam Abdulkarimova	Ukraine	84.49	26	26.04	26	58.45
WD	Maryia Saldakayeva	Belarus	withdrew	withdrew from competition			
WD	Cirinia Gillett	Philippines	withdrew	withdrew from competition			

=== Ice dance ===
Rank	Name	Nation	Total points	RD		FD	
1	Sara Hurtado / Kirill Khaliavin	Spain	193.47	1	76.08	1	117.39
2	Natalia Kaliszek / Maksym Spodyriev	Poland	185.48	4	75.17	2	110.31
3	Alexandra Nazarova / Maxim Nikitin	Ukraine	178.62	2	75.35	3	103.27
4	Annabelle Morozov / Andrei Bagin	Russia	178.02	3	75.25	4	102.77
5	Julia Wagret / Pierre Souquet	France	171.31	5	68.70	5	102.61
6	Katharina Müller / Tim Dieck	Germany	169.45	6	67.79	6	101.66
7	Emiliya Kalehanova / Uladzislau Palkhouski	Belarus	160.39	7	62.61	7	97.78
8	Arianna Wroblewska / Stéphane Walker	Switzerland	143.45	11	57.56	8	85.89
9	Nicole Kelly / Berk Akalın	Turkey	143.32	9	59.18	10	84.14
10	Lila-Maya Seclet Monchot / Renan Manceau	France	142.97	10	57.62	9	85.35
WD	Amanda Peterson / Maximilian Pfisterer	Germany	withdrew	8	59.94	withdrew from competition	
