= 2018 CS Tallinn Trophy =

International figure skating competition held in Tallinn

- Type: ISU Challenger Series
- Date: November 26 – December 2
- Season: 2018–19
- Location: Tallinn, Estonia
- Host: Estonian Skating Union
- Venue: Tondiraba Ice Hall

Champions
- Men's singles: (Russia) Maxim Kovtun
- Ladies' singles: (Russia) Serafima Sakhanovich
- Pairs: (Austria) Miriam Ziegler / Severin Kiefer
- Ice dance: (United States) Christina Carreira / Anthony Ponomarenko
- Previous: 2018 CS Inge Solar Memorial – Alpen Trophy
- Next: 2018 CS Golden Spin of Zagreb

The 2018 CS Tallinn Trophy was held from November 26–December 2, 2018 in Tallinn, Estonia. It is part of the 2018–19 ISU Challenger Series. Medals were awarded in the disciplines of men's singles, ladies' singles, pair skating, and ice dancing.

== Entries ==
The International Skating Union published the list of entries on October 30, 2018.

| Country | Men | Ladies | Pairs | Ice dance |
|---|---|---|---|---|
| Armenia | Slavik Hayrapetyan | Anastasia Galustyan | | |
| Austria | | Lara Roth | Miriam Ziegler / Severin Kiefer | |
| Azerbaijan | Vladimir Litvintsev | Ekaterina Ryabova | | |
| Belarus | Alexander Lebedev | Aliaksandra Chepeleva; Maryia Saldakayeva; Alina Suponenko | | |
| Chinese Taipei | | Amy Lin | | |
| Czech Republic | Jiří Bělohradský; Matyáš Bělohradský; Petr Kotlařík | Klara Stepanova; Elizaveta Ukolova | | |
| Denmark | | Pernille Sørensen | | |
| Estonia | Daniel Albert Naurits; Aleksandr Selevko | Eva Lotta Kiibus; Gerli Liinamäe; Kristina Shkuleta-Gromova | | Katerina Bunina / German Frolov |
| Finland | Roman Galay | Viveca Lindfors | | |
| France | Luc Economides | | | |
| Germany | Catalin Dimitrescu; Thomas Stoll | Nicole Schott | | Jennifer Urban / Benjamin Steffan |
| Hong Kong | | Yi Christy Leung | | |
| Israel | | Elena Rivkina | | |
| Italy | Mattia Dalla Torre; Alessandro Fadini | | Giulia Foresti / Edoardo Caputo; Rebecca Ghilardi / Filippo Ambrosini | |
| Kazakhstan | Nikita Manko; Artur Panikhin | Aiza Mambekova | Zhansaya Adykhanova / Abish Baytkanov | |
| Latvia | | Elizabete Jubkane; Angelīna Kučvaļska | | |
| Mexico | | Sofia del Rio | | |
| Poland | Lukasz Kedzierski; Erik Matysiak | | | Natalia Kaliszek / Maksym Spodyriev |
| Russia | Maxim Kovtun; Roman Savosin; Anton Shulepov | Anastasiia Gubanova; Daria Panenkova; Serafima Sakhanovich | | Sofia Evdokimova / Egor Bazin; Annabelle Morozov / Andrei Bagin; Anastasia Skoptcova / Kirill Aleshin |
| Slovakia | | Silvia Hugec | | |
| Switzerland | | Yoonmi Lehmann | | Victoria Manni / Carlo Roethlisberger |
| Ukraine | | | | Darya Popova / Volodymyr Byelikov |
| United Arab Emirates | | Zahra Lari | | |
| United States | Vincent Zhou | Karen Chen; Ting Cui | Jessica Calalang / Brian Johnson; Tarah Kayne / Danny O'Shea | Christina Carreira / Anthony Ponomarenko |

=== Changes to preliminary assignments ===
| Date | Discipline | Withdrew | Added | Reason/Other notes | Refs |
|---|---|---|---|---|---|
| November 2 | Ice dance | (Russia) Anastasia Shakun / Daniil Ragimov | (Russia) Anastasia Skoptcova / Kirill Aleshin | | |
| November 5 | Men | N/A | (Czech Republic) Petr Kotlařík | | |
| November 5 | Pairs | N/A | (Israel) Hailey Esther Kops / Artem Tsoglin | | |
| November 12 | Pairs | N/A | (Italy) Rebecca Ghilardi / Filippo Ambrosini | | |
| November 12 | Pairs | N/A | (United States) Jessica Calalang / Brian Johnson | | |
| November 14 | Ladies | (Austria) Natalie Klotz | N/A | | |
| November 14 | Ladies | (Germany) Lea Johanna Dastich | N/A | | |
| November 14 | Pairs | (Israel) Hailey Esther Kops / Artem Tsoglin | N/A | | |
| November 14 | Pairs | (United States) Haven Denney / Brandon Frazier | N/A | | |
| November 20 | Men | (Germany) Jonathan Hess | N/A | | |
| November 20 | Ladies | (Belarus) Katsiarina Pakhamovich | (Belarus) Aliaksandra Chepeleva | | |
| November 20 | Ladies | (Finland) Emmi Peltonen | N/A | | |
| November 20 | Pairs | (Japan) Riku Miura / Shoya Ichihashi | N/A | | |
| November 22 | Men | (Russia) Makar Ignatov | (Russia) Anton Shulepov | | |
| November 23 | Ladies | (Germany) Lutricia Bock | N/A | | |
| November 26 | Men | (Sweden) Gabriel Folkesson | N/A | | |
| November 26 | Ice dance | (France) Adelina Galayavieva / Louis Thauron | N/A | | |
| November 27 | Ladies | (Belgium) Loena Hendrickx | N/A | | |
| November 27 | Ladies | (Finland) Sofia Sula | N/A | | |
| November 27 | Ladies | (France) Anna Kuzmenko | N/A | Not senior age-eligible | |

== Results ==
=== Men ===
| Rank | Name | Nation | Total points | SP | | FS | |
|---|---|---|---|---|---|---|---|
| 1 | Maxim Kovtun | Russia | 247.55 | 1 | 80.91 | 1 | 166.64 |
| 2 | Vincent Zhou | United States | 234.25 | 3 | 77.46 | 2 | 156.79 |
| 3 | Anton Shulepov | Russia | 230.30 | 2 | 80.86 | 3 | 149.44 |
| 4 | Slavik Hayrapetyan | Armenia | 209.58 | 11 | 61.08 | 4 | 148.50 |
| 5 | Roman Savosin | Russia | 205.24 | 4 | 71.50 | 5 | 133.74 |
| 6 | Matyáš Bělohradský | Czech Republic | 192.72 | 5 | 69.39 | 9 | 123.33 |
| 7 | Luc Economides | France | 190.18 | 9 | 62.73 | 7 | 127.45 |
| 8 | Petr Kotlařík | Czech Republic | 188.38 | 10 | 61.86 | 8 | 126.52 |
| 9 | Vladimir Litvintsev | Azerbaijan | 188.21 | 6 | 66.41 | 10 | 121.80 |
| 10 | Mattia Dalla Torre | Italy | 184.87 | 8 | 65.11 | 12 | 119.76 |
| 11 | Alessandro Fadini | Italy | 183.99 | 16 | 56.32 | 6 | 127.67 |
| 12 | Aleksandr Selevko | Estonia | 178.57 | 12 | 60.88 | 13 | 117.69 |
| 13 | Daniel Albert Naurits | Estonia | 175.36 | 19 | 53.17 | 11 | 121.65 |
| 14 | Alexander Lebedev | Belarus | 173.42 | 15 | 57.34 | 14 | 116.08 |
| 15 | Jiří Bĕlohradský | Czech Republic | 173.05 | 14 | 57.61 | 15 | 115.44 |
| 16 | Roman Galay | Finland | 167.23 | 7 | 65.63 | 18 | 101.60 |
| 17 | Thomas Stoll | Germany | 161.26 | 17 | 54.99 | 16 | 106.27 |
| 18 | Catalin Dimitrescu | Germany | 155.38 | 13 | 58.12 | 19 | 97.26 |
| 19 | Lukasz Kedzierski | Poland | 152.85 | 21 | 49.51 | 17 | 103.34 |
| 20 | Nikita Manko | Kazakhstan | 147.46 | 18 | 54.48 | 20 | 92.63 |
| 21 | Artur Panikhin | Kazakhstan | 137.93 | 20 | 49.95 | 21 | 87.98 |
| 22 | Erik Matysiak | Poland | 127.67 | 22 | 47.12 | 22 | 80.55 |

=== Ladies ===
| Rank | Name | Nation | Total points | SP | | FS | |
|---|---|---|---|---|---|---|---|
| 1 | Serafima Sakhanovich | Russia | 202.62 | 1 | 70.33 | 1 | 132.29 |
| 2 | Ting Cui | United States | 199.79 | 2 | 67.56 | 2 | 132.23 |
| 3 | Viveca Lindfors | Finland | 185.42 | 3 | 63.56 | 3 | 121.86 |
| 4 | Anastasiia Gubanova | Russia | 180.73 | 4 | 60.29 | 4 | 120.44 |
| 5 | Daria Panenkova | Russia | 173.61 | 6 | 55.83 | 5 | 117.78 |
| 6 | Yi Christy Leung | Hong Kong | 171.95 | 5 | 56.70 | 6 | 115.25 |
| 7 | Pernille Sørensen | Denmark | 161.58 | 7 | 55.71 | 8 | 105.87 |
| 8 | Ekaterina Ryabova | Azerbaijan | 157.20 | 17 | 45.95 | 7 | 111.25 |
| 9 | Anastasia Galustyan | Armenia | 155.70 | 11 | 52.39 | 10 | 103.31 |
| 10 | Nicole Schott | Germany | 154.83 | 13 | 50.42 | 9 | 104.41 |
| 11 | Yoonmi Lehmann | Switzerland | 152.61 | 12 | 52.16 | 11 | 100.45 |
| 12 | Gerli Liinamäe | Estonia | 150.18 | 8 | 53.54 | 12 | 96.64 |
| 13 | Amy Lin | Chinese Taipei | 140.03 | 10 | 52.86 | 15 | 87.17 |
| 14 | Eva Lotta Kiibus | Estonia | 137.25 | 15 | 46.58 | 14 | 90.67 |
| 15 | Silvia Hugec | Slovakia | 135.44 | 14 | 49.90 | 17 | 85.54 |
| 16 | Klara Stepanova | Czech Republic | 135.20 | 23 | 40.18 | 13 | 95.02 |
| 17 | Elizaveta Ukolova | Czech Republic | 131.48 | 18 | 45.54 | 16 | 85.94 |
| 18 | Aliaksandra Chepeleva | Belarus | 129.87 | 16 | 46.28 | 20 | 83.59 |
| 19 | Angelīna Kučvaļska | Latvia | 125.65 | 22 | 40.45 | 18 | 85.20 |
| 20 | Aiza Mambekova | Kazakhstan | 123.12 | 25 | 38.40 | 19 | 84.72 |
| 21 | Sofia del Rio | Mexico | 122.73 | 21 | 43.37 | 21 | 79.36 |
| 22 | Kristina Shkuleta-Gromova | Estonia | 122.31 | 20 | 44.44 | 22 | 77.87 |
| 23 | Elizabete Jubkane | Latvia | 114.72 | 19 | 45.41 | 25 | 69.31 |
| 24 | Lara Roth | Austria | 110.02 | 26 | 36.81 | 24 | 73.21 |
| 25 | Elena Rivkina | Israel | 109.16 | 24 | 39.93 | 26 | 69.23 |
| 26 | Maryia Saldakayeva | Belarus | 108.05 | 27 | 34.80 | 23 | 73.25 |
| 27 | Alina Suponenko | Belarus | 98.50 | 28 | 30.99 | 27 | 67.51 |
| 28 | Zahra Lari | United Arab Emirates | 81.58 | 29 | 27.98 | 28 | 53.60 |
| WD | Karen Chen | United States | withdrew | 9 | 52.93 | withdrew from competition | |

=== Pairs ===
| Rank | Name | Nation | Total points | SP | | FS | |
|---|---|---|---|---|---|---|---|
| 1 | Miriam Ziegler / Severin Kiefer | Austria | 184.60 | 1 | 66.08 | 2 | 118.52 |
| 2 | Tarah Kayne / Danny O'Shea | United States | 177.69 | 4 | 57.28 | 1 | 120.41 |
| 3 | Jessica Calalang / Brian Johnson | United States | 172.31 | 2 | 60.37 | 3 | 111.94 |
| 4 | Rebecca Ghilardi / Filippo Ambrosini | Italy | 156.84 | 3 | 57.38 | 4 | 99.46 |
| 5 | Giulia Foresti / Edoardo Caputo | Italy | 124.97 | 5 | 42.48 | 5 | 82.49 |
| 6 | Zhansaya Adykhanova / Abish Baytkanov | Kazakhstan | 90.84 | 6 | 34.18 | 6 | 56.66 |

=== Ice dancing ===
| Rank | Name | Nation | Total points | RD | | FD | |
|---|---|---|---|---|---|---|---|
| 1 | Christina Carreira / Anthony Ponomarenko | United States | 180.22 | 2 | 69.58 | 1 | 110.64 |
| 2 | Anastasia Skoptcova / Kirill Aleshin | Russia | 179.78 | 1 | 71.17 | 3 | 108.61 |
| 3 | Natalia Kaliszek / Maksym Spodyriev | Poland | 178.43 | 3 | 69.42 | 2 | 109.01 |
| 4 | Sofia Evdokimova / Egor Bazin | Russia | 168.31 | 4 | 62.28 | 4 | 106.03 |
| 5 | Darya Popova / Volodymyr Byelikov | Ukraine | 154.42 | 6 | 59.01 | 5 | 95.41 |
| 6 | Jennifer Urban / Benjamin Steffan | Germany | 154.27 | 5 | 60.56 | 6 | 93.71 |
| 7 | Annabelle Morozov / Andrei Bagin | Russia | 148.00 | 7 | 56.47 | 7 | 91.53 |
| 8 | Victoria Manni / Carlo Roethlisberger | Switzerland | 138.81 | 8 | 53.24 | 8 | 85.57 |
| 9 | Katerina Bunina / German Frolov | Estonia | 132.52 | 9 | 51.45 | 9 | 81.07 |
