= 2021 CS Cup of Austria =

Figure skating competition

- Type: ISU Challenger Series
- Date: November 11 – 14
- Season: 2021–22
- Location: Graz, Austria
- Host: Skate Austria
- Venue: Merkur Eisstadion

Champions
- Men's singles: (Georgia (country)) Nika Egadze
- Women's singles: (Japan) Wakaba Higuchi
- Ice dance: (Italy) Charlène Guignard / Marco Fabbri
- Previous: 2015 CS Ice Challenge
- Next: 2022 CS Ice Challenge
- Previous CS: 2021 CS Denis Ten Memorial Challenge
- Next CS: 2021 CS Warsaw Cup

The 2021 CS Cup of Austria by Icechallenge was held on November 11–14, 2021 in Graz, Austria. It was part of the 2021–22 ISU Challenger Series. Medals were awarded in the disciplines of men's singles, women's singles, and ice dance.

== Entries ==
The International Skating Union published the list of entries on October 18, 2021.

Country	Men	Women	Ice dance
Austria	Luc Maierhofer; Maurizio Zandron	Stefanie Pesendorfer; Sophia Schaller	
Belarus	Alexander Lebedev	Milana Ramashova	
Canada	Corey Circelli; Beres Clements	Emily Bausback; Alison Schumacher	Alicia Fabbri / Paul Ayer; Laurence Fournier Beaudry / Nikolaj Sørensen; Molly Lanaghan / Dmitre Razgulajevs
Croatia	Charles Henry Katanović; Jari Kessler	Hana Cvijanović	
Cyprus		Emilea Zingas	
Czech Republic	Matyáš Bělohradský	Nikola Rychtaříková	
Estonia	Arlet Levandi; Mihhail Selevko	Eva-Lotta Kiibus; Gerli Liinamäe; Niina Petrõkina	Aleksandra Samersova / Kevin Ojala
Finland	Makar Suntsev	Linnea Ceder; Oona Ounasvuori	
France	Landry Le May; Adrien Tesson		
Georgia	Nika Egadze		
Germany	Kai Jagoda; Nikita Starostin; Thomas Stoll	Aya Hatakawa; Kristina Isaev; Nargiz Süleymanova	Jennifer Janse van Rensburg / Benjamin Steffan; Lara Luft / Maximilian Pfisterer; Katharina Müller / Tim Dieck
Great Britain		Natasha McKay; Nina Povey; Kristen Spours	
Hong Kong	Adonis Wai Chung Wong		
India		Tara Prasad	
Israel	Daniel Samohin		Elizabeth Bernardini / Ronald Zilberberg
Italy	Raffaele Francesco Zich	Ginevra Lavinia Negrello; Roberta Rodeghiero	Charlène Guignard / Marco Fabbri; Carolina Moscheni / Francesco Fioretti
Japan	Lucas Tsuyoshi Honda; Sena Miyake	Wakaba Higuchi; Tomoe Kawabata	
Mongolia		Maral-Erdene Gansukh	
Norway		Frida Turiddotter Berge; Linnea Sophie Kolstad Kilsand	
Philippines	Michael Christian Martinez		
Poland			Jenna Hertenstein / Damian Binkowski
Russia	Evgeni Semenenko		Diana Davis / Gleb Smolkin; Ekaterina Mironova / Evgenii Ustenko
Slovakia		Alexandra Michaela Filcová	Mária Sofia Pucherová / Nikita Lysak
South Korea		Park Yeon-jeong	
Spain	Pablo García	Marian Millares	Olivia Smart / Adrián Díaz
Sweden		Emelie Ling	
Switzerland	Nicola Todeschini		
Turkey	Burak Demirboğa; Başar Oktar	Sinem Pekder; Yasemin Zeki	
United States	Ilia Malinin	Starr Andrews; Audrey Shin	Emily Bratti / Ian Somerville; Lorraine McNamara / Anton Spiridonov; Katarina Wolfkostin / Jeffrey Chen

=== Changes to preliminary assignments ===
Date	Discipline	Withdrew	Added	Reason/Other notes	Refs
October 27	Women	(Mongolia) Merilyn Otgonbayar			
October 27	Women	(United States) Bradie Tennell			
October 27	Ice dance	(Australia) India Nette / Eron Westwood	(Russia) Ekaterina Mironova / Evgenii Ustenko		
October 27	Ice dance	(Georgia (country)) Maria Kazakova / Georgy Reviya			
October 27	Ice dance	(Poland) Natalia Kaliszek / Maksym Spodyriev			
October 27	Ice dance	(Poland) Anastasia Polibina / Pavel Golovishnikov			
October 27	Ice dance	(Russia) Anzhelika Abachkina / Pavel Drozd			
October 27	Ice dance	(Russia) Elizaveta Khudaiberdieva / Egor Bazin			
November 4	Ice dance	(France) Loïcia Demougeot / Théo Le Mercier			
November 4	Ice dance	(France) Marie Dupayage / Thomas Nabais			
November 4	Ice dance	(France) Adelina Galyavieva / Louis Thauron		Split	
November 5	Women	(Cyprus) Marilena Kitromilis			
November 5	Ice dance	(Lithuania) Allison Reed / Saulius Ambrulevičius			
November 8	Men				
November 8	Men	(Bulgaria) Alexander Zlatkov			
November 8	Men	(France) Kévin Aymoz	(France) Adrien Tesson		
November 8	Men	(Slovakia) Adam Hagara			
November 8	Women	(Poland) Karolina Białas			
November 9	Women	(Japan) Mana Kawabe		Conflict with NHK Trophy	
November 10	Men	(France) Luc Economides			
November 10	Men	(Russia) Mikhail Kolyada	(Russia) Evgeni Semenenko		
November 10	Women	(Georgia (country)) Anastasiia Gubanova			
November 10	Women	(Sweden) Anita Östlund			
November 11	Men	(Russia) Gleb Lutfullin			
November 11	Women	(Russia) Elizaveta Tuktamysheva			

== Results ==
=== Men ===
Rank	Name	Nation	Total points	SP		FS	
1	Nika Egadze	Georgia	227.57	12	68.02	1	159.55
2	Lucas Tsuyoshi Honda	Japan	225.89	1	83.95	5	141.94
3	Ilia Malinin	United States	222.55	13	67.58	2	154.97
4	Mihhail Selevko	Estonia	221.11	2	82.61	7	138.50
5	Maurizio Zandron	Austria	220.81	3	79.06	6	141.75
6	Arlet Levandi	Estonia	219.83	5	75.10	3	144.73
7	Sena Miyake	Japan	214.87	9	70.57	4	144.30
8	Nikita Starostin	Germany	208.96	4	75.78	10	133.18
9	Landry Le May	France	206.64	10	70.53	8	136.11
10	Corey Circelli	Canada	201.62	14	67.41	9	134.21
11	Luc Maierhofer	Austria	201.53	8	70.60	12	130.93
12	Adrien Tesson	France	196.44	15	66.44	13	130.00
13	Jari Kessler	Croatia	195.14	11	69.54	15	125.60
14	Burak Demirboğa	Turkey	194.49	19	63.10	11	131.39
15	Matyáš Bělohradský	Czech Republic	192.08	18	64.20	14	127.88
16	Beres Clements	Canada	191.84	6	71.45	17	120.39
17	Nicola Todeschini	Switzerland	191.48	7	71.09	18	120.39
18	Daniel Samohin	Israel	184.51	16	66.33	20	118.18
19	Raffaele Francesco Zich	Italy	183.04	17	64.69	19	118.35
20	Başar Oktar	Turkey	179.29	24	57.84	16	121.45
21	Makar Suntsev	Finland	169.35	22	58.40	22	110.95
22	Kai Jagoda	Germany	168.57	21	60.20	24	108.37
23	Michael Christian Martinez	Philippines	166.47	25	57.50	23	108.97
24	Pablo García	Spain	166.41	26	55.43	21	110.98
25	Thomas Stoll	Germany	166.24	23	58.31	25	107.93
26	Charles Henry Katanović	Croatia	145.72	27	53.20	26	92.52
27	Adonis Wai Chung Wong	Hong Kong	125.13	28	44.38	27	80.75
WD	Alexander Lebedev	Belarus	withdrew	20	62.53	withdrew from competition	
WD	Evgeni Semenenko	Russia	withdrew from competition				

=== Women ===
Rank	Name	Nation	Total points	SP		FS	
1	Wakaba Higuchi	Japan	189.43	1	79.73	4	109.70
2	Park Yeon-jeong	South Korea	184.07	2	57.84	1	126.23
3	Niina Petrõkina	Estonia	181.17	3	57.39	2	123.78
4	Audrey Shin	United States	169.99	5	54.58	3	115.41
5	Starr Andrews	United States	157.35	7	53.78	6	103.57
6	Milana Ramashova	Belarus	155.30	18	46.53	5	108.77
7	Emily Bausback	Canada	154.30	4	55.06	11	99.24
8	Sophia Schaller	Austria	152.01	15	48.46	7	103.55
9	Tomoe Kawabata	Japan	149.96	6	54.34	15	95.62
10	Kristina Isaev	Germany	149.78	10	51.85	13	97.93
11	Oona Ounasvuori	Finland	149.23	11	50.79	12	98.44
12	Ginevra Lavinia Negrello	Italy	147.85	12	50.61	14	97.24
13	Alison Schumacher	Canada	147.14	17	46.68	8	100.46
14	Natasha McKay	Great Britain	145.60	25	45.46	9	100.14
15	Stefanie Pesendorfer	Austria	145.24	22	45.78	10	99.46
16	Emilea Zingas	Cyprus	144.67	13	50.02	16	94.65
17	Eva-Lotta Kiibus	Estonia	143.40	9	52.24	17	91.16
18	Nikola Rychtaříková	Czech Republic	136.50	21	45.79	19	90.71
19	Linnea Ceder	Finland	136.38	23	45.64	18	90.74
20	Gerli Liinamäe	Estonia	136.25	8	53.27	23	82.98
21	Nina Povey	Great Britain	134.89	16	46.89	21	88.00
22	Alexandra Michaela Filcová	Slovakia	132.15	28	42.23	20	89.92
23	Kristen Spours	Great Britain	131.81	24	45.56	22	86.25
24	Aya Hatakawa	Germany	128.94	19	46.11	24	82.83
25	Frida Turiddotter Berge	Norway	125.03	20	45.89	26	79.14
26	Linnea Sophie Kolstad Kilsand	Norway	117.25	14	48.54	28	68.71
27	Roberta Rodeghiero	Italy	114.49	27	42.54	27	71.95
28	Emelie Ling	Sweden	112.54	32	33.34	25	79.20
29	Tara Prasad	India	110.58	26	44.44	30	66.14
30	Hana Cvijanović	Croatia	104.38	30	37.01	29	67.37
31	Sinem Pekder	Turkey	99.22	29	39.99	31	59.23
32	Yasemin Zeki	Turkey	94.18	31	36.82	32	57.36
33	Marian Millares	Spain	79.57	33	26.44	33	53.13
34	Maral-Erdene Gansukh	Mongolia	78.92	34	25.90	34	53.02
WD	Nargiz Süleymanova	Germany	withdrew from competition				

=== Ice dance ===
Rank	Name	Nation	Total points	RD		FD	
1	Charlène Guignard / Marco Fabbri	Italy	208.88	1	82.78	1	126.10
2	Laurence Fournier Beaudry / Nikolaj Sørensen	Canada	194.67	3	77.38	2	117.29
3	Olivia Smart / Adrián Díaz	Spain	189.88	2	78.53	3	111.35
4	Diana Davis / Gleb Smolkin	Russia	184.62	4	73.37	4	111.25
5	Alicia Fabbri / Paul Ayer	Canada	171.63	6	68.24	5	103.39
6	Katharina Müller / Tim Dieck	Germany	170.57	5	69.73	8	100.84
7	Jennifer Janse van Rensburg / Benjamin Steffan	Germany	168.50	8	65.91	6	102.59
8	Emily Bratti / Ian Somerville	United States	166.83	7	67.18	9	99.65
9	Katarina Wolfkostin / Jeffrey Chen	United States	164.33	10	63.04	7	101.29
10	Lorraine McNamara / Anton Spiridonov	United States	159.03	9	63.82	10	95.21
11	Molly Lanaghan / Dmitre Razgulajevs	Canada	154.03	12	60.83	11	93.20
12	Lara Luft / Maximilian Pfisterer	Germany	150.42	13	59.99	12	90.43
13	Ekaterina Mironova / Evgenii Ustenko	Russia	144.79	11	60.84	13	83.95
14	Carolina Moscheni / Francesco Fioretti	Italy	143.31	14	59.66	14	83.65
15	Aleksandra Samersova / Kevin Ojala	Estonia	124.50	16	50.10	15	74.40
16	Elizabeth Bernardini / Ronald Zilberberg	Israel	124.02	15	56.32	17	67.70
17	Jenna Hertenstein / Damian Binkowski	Poland	112.85	18	43.13	16	69.72
WD	Mária Sofia Pucherová / Nikita Lysak	Slovakia	withdrew from competition	17	47.11	withdrew from competition	
