= Alexandr Kazakov =

Belarusian figure skater and coach

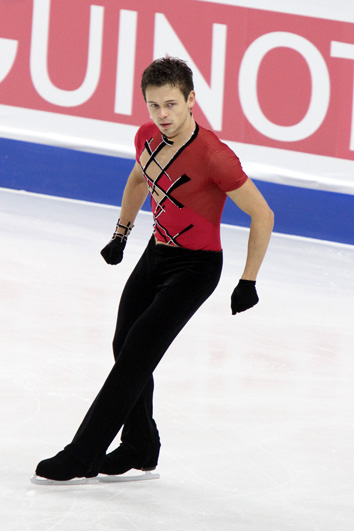

Personal information
- Born: 31 August 1986 (age 39) Kirov, Kirov Oblast, Russian SFSR, Soviet Union
- Height: 1.65 m (5 ft 5 in)

Figure skating career
- Country: Belarus
- Coach: Alexei Urmanov, Oksana Kazakova, Nikolai Komarovski, Vladimir Klochko, Evgeni Tarasov
- Began skating: 1991
- Retired: 2010

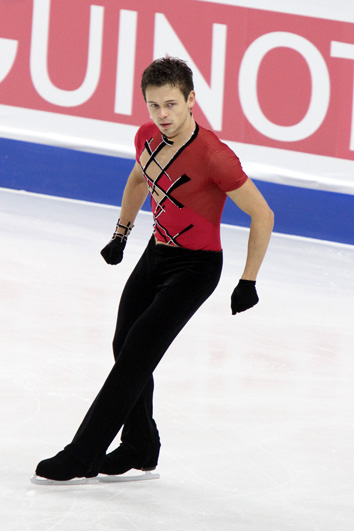
Kazakov at the 2010 World Figure Skating Championships

Alexandr Kazakov (Belarusian: Аляксандр Казакоў; Russian: Александр Казаков; born 31 August 1986) is a Belarusian figure skater and coach. He is a two-time Belarusian national champion and reached the free skate at two ISU Championships – 2008 Europeans in Zagreb and 2010 Worlds in Turin. His coaches included Evgeni Tarasov, Vladimir Klochko, Nikolai Komarovski, Alexei Urmanov, and Oksana Kazakova.

After retiring from competition, Kazakov became a skating coach in Minsk, Belarus. He has coached Vitali Luchanok, Mikhail Karaliuk, and Ksenia Bakusheva.

== Programs ==
Season	Short program	Free skating
2009–10	The Professional by Ennio Morricone	Requiem for a Dream by Clint Mansell choreo. by Oksana Kazakova
2008–09	Ice Symphony by Edvin Marton choreo. by Svetlana Korol	Classical medley by Edvin Marton
2007–08	Moonlight Sonata bv Ludwig van Beethoven (modern arrangement)	Classical medley by Edvin Marton choreo. by Olga Klinkovich
2005–06	Romeo and Juliet by Sergei Prokofiev	The Mummy by Jerry Goldsmith choreo. by Ilona Protasenia

== Competitive highlights ==
International
Event	03–04	04–05	05–06	06–07	07–08	08–09	09–10
World Champ.					25th	43rd	19th
European Champ.					18th	31st	30th
Cup of Nice					7th	6th	6th
Finlandia Trophy						9th	
Nebelhorn Trophy							15th
Universiade						15th	
International: Junior
World Junior Champ.			28th				
JGP Estonia			9th				
JGP Poland			18th				
Warsaw Cup	3rd J						
National
Belarusian Champ.	5th	2nd	2nd	2nd	2nd	1st	1st
J = Junior level; JGP = Junior Grand Prix
