= Viktoriia Safonova =

Russian-Belarusian figure skater

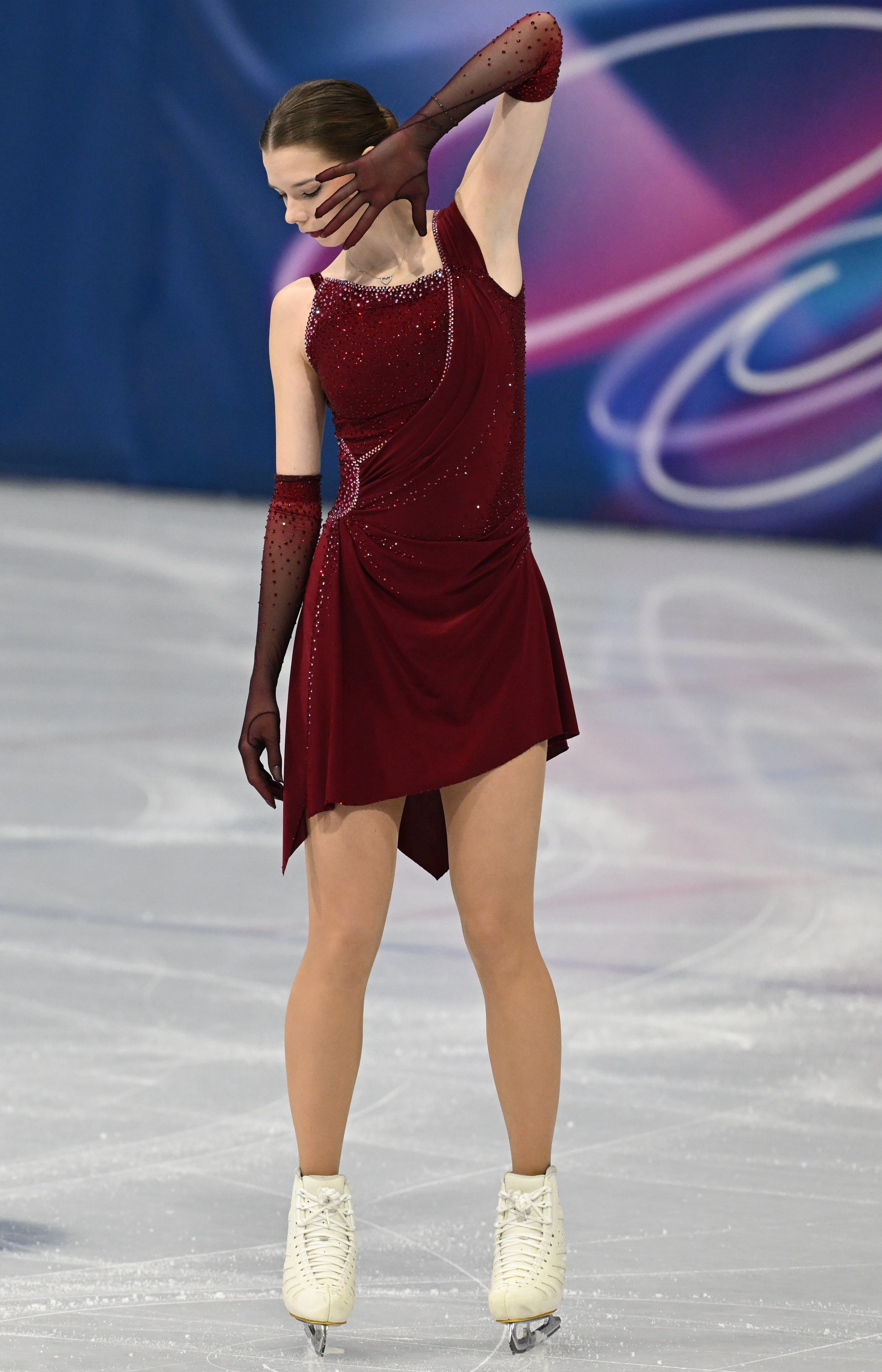
- Safonova at the 2026 Winter Olympics

Personal information
- Native name: Виктория Андреевна Сафонова
- Full name: Viktoriia Andreevna Safonova
- Other names: Viktoria/Victoria/Viktoriya
- Born: 8 May 2003 (age 23) Moscow, Russia
- Home town: Moscow, Russia
- Height: 1.74 m (5 ft 9 in)

Figure skating career
- Country: (Individual Neutral Athletes) Individual Neutral Athlete; Belarus; Russia (until 2019)
- Coach: Oleg Vasiliev

Medal record
Belarusian Championships
Gold medal – first place	2020 Minsk	Singles
Gold medal – first place	2021 Minsk	Singles
Gold medal – first place	2022 Minsk	Singles
Gold medal – first place	2023 Minsk	Singles
Gold medal – first place	2024 Minsk	Singles
Gold medal – first place	2025 Minsk	Singles
Gold medal – first place	2026 Minsk	Singles

Viktoriia Andreevna Safonova (Russian: Виктория Андреевна Сафонова, Belarusian: Вікторыя Андрэеўна Сафонава; born 8 May 2003) is a Russian-Belarusian figure skater who currently competes as an Individual Neutral Athlete. She is the 2019 CS Golden Spin of Zagreb silver medalist, the 2021 CS Nebelhorn Trophy bronze medalist, the 2020 Ice Star champion, the 2019 Volvo Open Cup champion, and a seven-time Belarusian national champion (2020–26). Viktoriia is capable of landing the Quadruple Loop jump in practice, the only Belarusian woman to do so.

Safonova represented Belarus at the 2022 Winter Olympics and competed as an Individual Neutral Athlete at the 2026 Winter Olympics.

== Personal life ==
Viktoriia Safonova was born on 8 May 2003 in Moscow, Russia.

== Career ==
=== Early career ===
Safonova's first coach was Elena Selivanova. She placed fourteenth at the 2018 Russian Junior Championships and eighth at the 2019 Russian Junior Championships. In addition, Safonova won the 2018 Ice Star while competing for Russia.

=== 2019–2020 season: Debut for Belarus ===
Safonova switched to representing Belarus in August 2019, alongside former Russian national teammates Konstantin Milyukov and Victoria Yatsenko / Daniil Parkman. She placed fourth at a Russian domestic event earlier in the summer, but was not included into the national team. Safonova won the Summer Cup of the Skating Union of Belarus in her domestic debut.

According to International Skating Union rules for switching nationalities, Safonova was required to sit out international competition for a year dating from her last international appearance, ruling her ineligible for Junior Grand Prix events. Coached by Oksana Matveeva, Safonova made her international debut for Belarus at the 2019 Volvo Open Cup, where she won the gold medal ahead of Azerbaijan's Ekaterina Ryabova and Alina Urushadze of Georgia. She then placed seventh at 2019 CS Warsaw Cup. Safonova earned personal bests in all segments to win the silver medal at 2019 CS Golden Spin of Zagreb, behind Elizaveta Tuktamysheva of Russia and ahead of Germany's Nicole Schott.

Safonova won the national title in her first attempt at the 2020 Belarusian Championships, ahead of Milana Ramashova and Anastasiya Sidorenko. She then finished fourteenth at the 2020 European Championships. Safonova had been assigned to compete at the World Championships in Montreal, but those were cancelled as a result of the coronavirus pandemic.

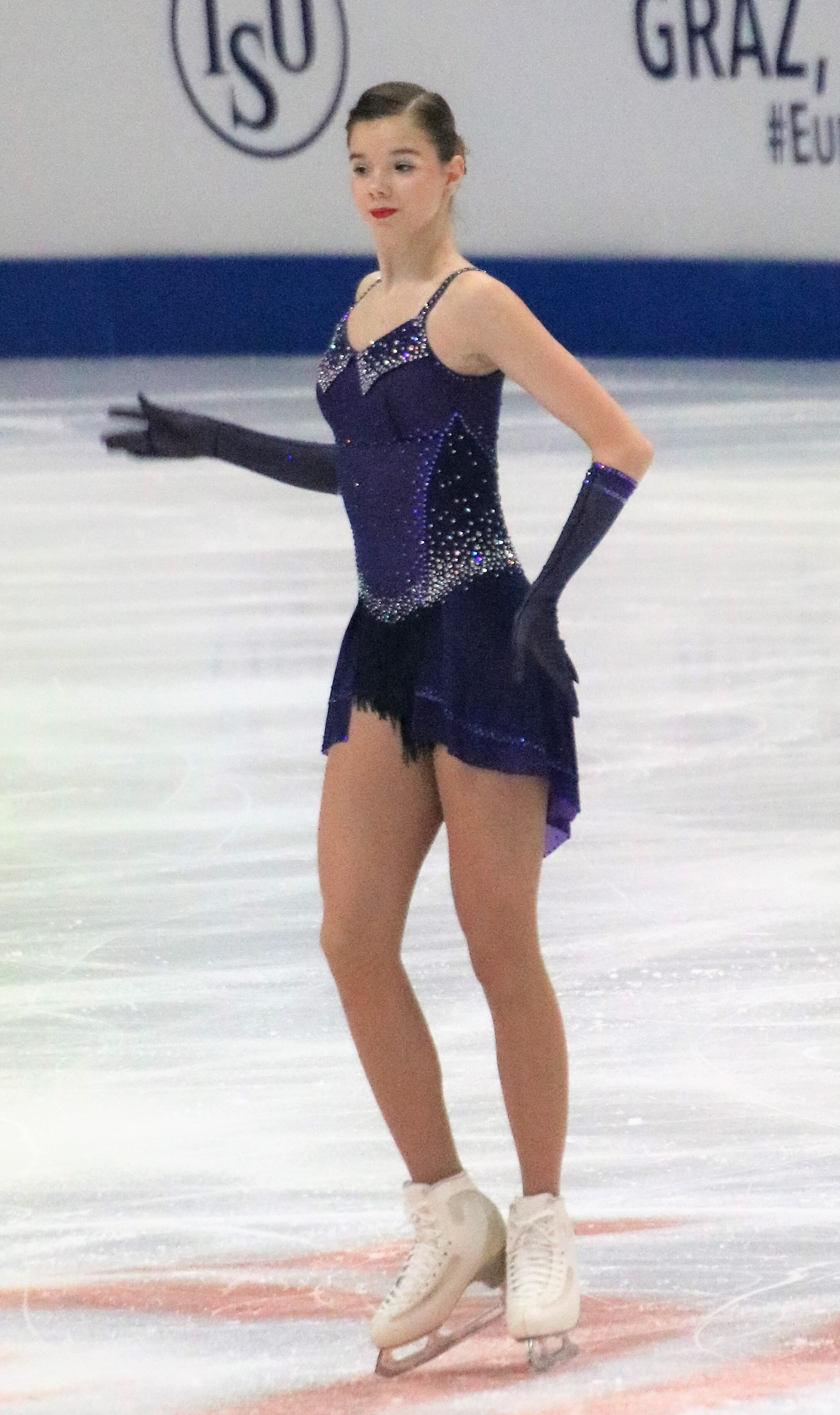
Safonova during her short program at the 2020 European Championships

=== 2020–2021 season ===
Safonova opened her season at the 2020 Ice Star in October, winning gold ahead of Russians Anastasiia Guliakova and Sofia Samodurova. She was assigned to make her Grand Prix debut at the 2020 Rostelecom Cup, placing eighth at the event. Safonova was scheduled to compete at the 2021 World Championships but was forced to withdraw two days before the ladies' short program due to a positive COVID-19 test.

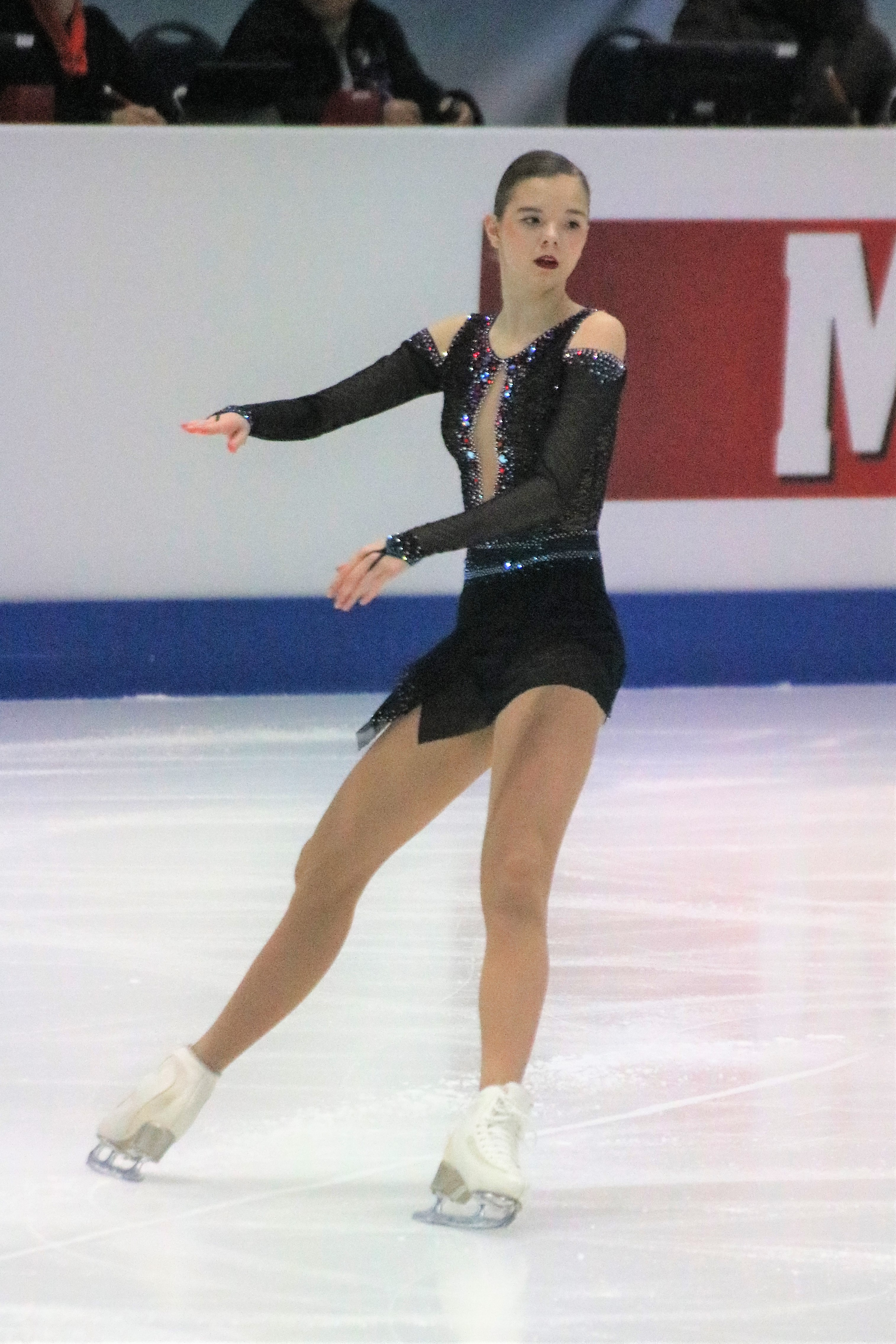
Safonova performing a spread eagle during her free skate at the 2020 European Championships

=== 2021–2022 season: Beijing Olympics ===
Following the withdrawal from the World Championships, Safonova competed at the beginning of the new season at the 2021 CS Nebelhorn Trophy, seeking a second opportunity to qualify a berth for Belarus at the 2022 Winter Olympics. She was third in both segments to win the bronze medal, taking the third of six available spots. She went on to place eighth at the 2021 CS Finlandia Trophy and repeat as gold medalist at the Ice Star. She won the gold medal at the 2021 CS Denis Ten Memorial Challenge. Safonova was invited to compete on the Grand Prix at the 2021 Rostelecom Cup following the withdrawal of Kazakh skater Elizabet Tursynbaeva. She placed seventh at the event.

At the 2022 European Championships in Tallinn, Safonova finished ninth. Named to the Belarusian team for the 2022 Winter Olympics, Safonova placed seventeenth in the short program of the women's event. Thirteenth in the free skate, she rose to thirteenth overall.

In March 2022, the International Skating Union banned Russian and Belarusian athletes from competing in international competitions following the Russian invasion of Ukraine.

=== 2025–2026 season: Milano Cortina Olympics ===
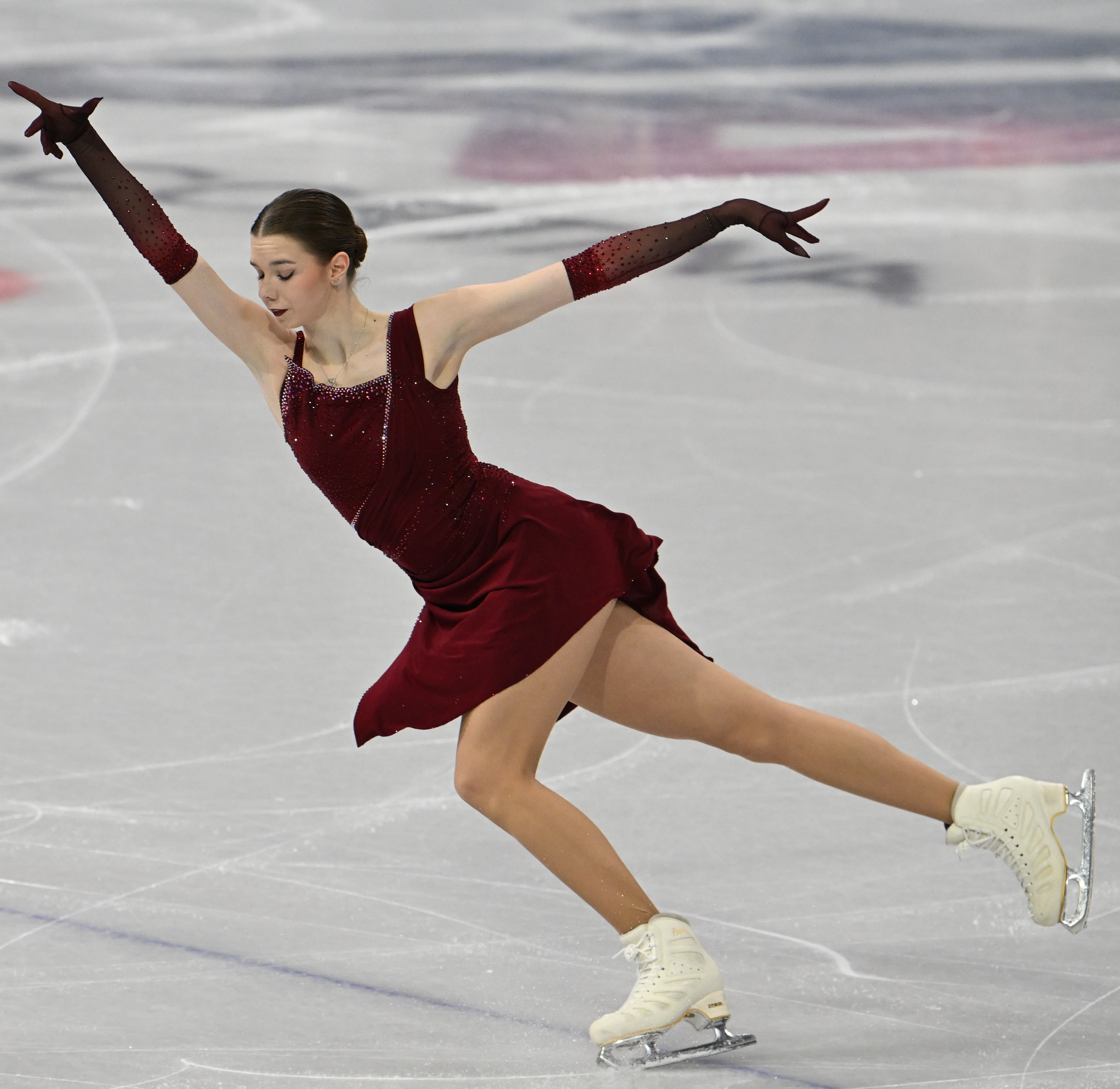
Safonova performing her short program at the 2026 Winter Olympics

In May 2025, the International Skating Union announced that Safonova had been approved as an Individual Neutral Athlete (AIN), making her eligible to compete at the 2025 ISU Olympic Qualifying Competition to vie for a spot to compete at the 2026 Winter Olympics. She competed at the Skate To Milano competition in Beijing, China, finishing in fourth place and securing herself an Olympic spot.

In November, the International Olympic Committee (IOC) officially declared Safonova as eligible to compete at the 2026 Winter Olympics.

On 17 February, Safonova competed in the women's short program at the 2026 Winter Olympics. She doubled out on what was intended to be a triple toe on the second part of her planned jump combination. This costly mistake led her to finish in twenty-sixth place, failing to qualify for the event's free skate segment.

Following the Olympics, it was announced that Safonova had left longtime coach, Oksana Matveeva, and was now training under Oleg Vasiliev.

=== 2026–2027 season ===
On June 30, 2026, the International Skating Union announced that figure skaters from Russia and Belarus would be allowed to compete at international competitions as Individual Neutral Athletes (AINs). Each of these skaters are required to undergo an individual assessment conducted by the ISU Council to determine whether they meet the criteria for neutral status. Safonova's application was approved, allowing her to continue competing as a neutral athlete.

Safonova opened the new season at the 2026 Trialeti Trophy, where she placed fifth overall. The following week, Safonova competed at the 2026 CS Denis Ten Memorial where she placed fourth overall. Safonova achieved new personal best scores across both program segments, as well as overall. Safonova's results named her to the Grand Prix alternate list and she replaced Iida Karhunen at Skate Canada.

On route to Skate Canada, Safonova received her Canadian visa just three days before the women's event was scheduled to begin. However, the only place where she could get her visa stamped into her passport in time was in Warsaw, Poland. Safonova travelled for two days; 12 hours by bus, an appointment at the embassy, and then straight to the airport for three connecting flights, Frankfurt–Vancouver–Kelowna. Safonova arrived the evening before the short program, ultimately missing the training sessions. Safonova travelled alone, her coach was not able to obtain a visa in time. “Honestly, even when I was on the plane, I still couldn’t believe it had actually worked out. It felt like I was flying in a dream. And even when I walked into the rink this morning, everything still seemed unreal. It all happened so quickly that I didn’t even have time to properly process it." Competing the short program segment, Safonova fell on her solo jump, placing her eleventh in that segment. She later placed tenth in the free program, concluding the event in tenth overall. "I was very nervous, because there was no time to adapt. I practically came straight off the plane onto the official practice for the short program. Today (the free program) was a little easier, but still not as easy as at the Denis Ten Memorial" she shared.

== Programs ==
Season	Short program	Free skating	Exhibition
2026–2027	Serpent by Dwara and Alexander Vincent choreo. by Artem Fedorchenko	Yo Viviré by Gloria Gaynor performed by J2 ft. Ilza choreo. by Sergei Verbillo, Julia Goryunova	
2025–2026	Bésame Mucho by Consuelo Velázquez performed by J2 ft. Ilza choreo. by Artem Fedorchenko	Yo Viviré by Gloria Gaynor performed by J2 ft. Ilza choreo. by Sergei Verbillo, Julia Goryunova	
2024–2025	You Don't Own Me by Lesley Gore performed by Breanna Whitaker	Proud by Tamara Todevska	
2023–2024	Never Tear Us Apart (from Fifty Shades Freed) performed by Bishop Briggs	Proud by Tamara Todevska	
2022–2023	Deliciate by Eric Fernández	Your Heart Is as Black as Night by Melody Gardot; Power by Elliot Wheeler & Donna Missal	я искала тебя by A-Studio; My Love by Sharon Kovacs
2021–2022	Time to Say Goodbye by Sarah Brightman & Andrea Bocelli	Your Heart Is as Black as Night by Melody Gardot; Power by Elliot Wheeler & Donna Missal	
2020–2021	Je t'aime by Lara Fabian	Boléro by Maurice Ravel	
2019–2020	Welcome to Burlesque (from Burlesque) performed by Cher	Boléro by Maurice Ravel	

== Competitive highlights ==
- GP – Event of the ISU Grand Prix Series
- CS – Event of the ISU Challenger Series
- TBD – Placement to be decided
- WD - Withdraw
- C – Event was cancelled

=== Skating as an Individual Neutral Athlete ===
Competition placements at senior level
Season	2025–26	2026–27
Winter Olympic Games	26th	
GP Skate Canada		10th
GP NHK Trophy		TBD
CS Denis Ten Memorial		4th
Denkova-Staviski Cup		1st
Skate to Milano	4th	
CS Trialeti Trophy		5th

=== For Belarus ===
Competition placements at senior level
Season	2019–20	2020–21	2021–22	2022–23	2023–24	2024–25	2025–26
Winter Olympics			12th				
World Championships	C	WD					
European Championships	14th		8th				
Belarusian Championships	1st	1st	1st	1st	1st	1st	1st
GP Rostelecom Cup		8th	7th				
CS Denis Ten Memorial			1st				
CS Finlandia Trophy			8th				
CS Golden Spin of Zagreb	2nd						
CS Nebelhorn Trophy			3rd				
CS Warsaw Cup	7th						
Ice Star		1st	1st				
Tallink Hotels Cup	3rd						
Volvo Open Cup	1st						
Winter Star		1st					

=== For Russia ===
Competition placements at junior level
Season	2017–18	2018–19
Russian Championships	14th	8th
Ice Star		1st
Russian Cup Final	8th	6th

== Detailed results ==
=== For Belarus ===
ISU personal best scores in the +5/-5 GOE System
Segment	Type	Score	Event
Total	TSS	198.80	2026 CS Denis Ten Memorial Challenge
Short program	TSS	68.42	2026 CS Denis Ten Memorial Challenge
Short program	TES	39.43	2026 CS Denis Ten Memorial Challenge
Short program	PCS	29.84	2021 CS Denis Ten Memorial Challenge
Free skating	TSS	130.38	2026 CS Denis Ten Memorial Challenge
Free skating	TES	70.44	2026 CS Denis Ten Memorial Challenge
Free skating	PCS	59.94	2026 CS Denis Ten Memorial Challenge

=== Skating as an Individual Neutral Athlete ===
Results in the 2026-27 season
Date	Event	SP		FS		Total	
Date	Event	P	Score	P	Score	P	Score
1–4 Oct, 2026	(Georgia (country)) 2026 CS Trialeti Trophy	6	62.93	4	123.95	5	186.88
8–11 Oct, 2026	(Kazakhstan) 2026 CS Denis Ten Memorial Challenge	4	68.42	4	130.38	4	198.80
31 Oct - 1 Nov, 2026	2026 Skate Canada International	11	56.89	10	105.58	10	162.47
Nov 6–8, 2026	(Bulgaria) 2026 Denkova-Staviski Cup	1	69.33	1	122.93	1	192.26

Results in the 2025–26 season
Date	Event	SP		FS		Total	
Date	Event	P	Score	P	Score	P	Score
Sep 18–21, 2025	(China) 2025 ISU Skate to Milano	7	57.71	4	124.20	4	181.91
Feb 17–19, 2026	(Italy) 2026 Winter Olympics	26	54.57	—N/a	—N/a	26	54.57

=== Skating for Belarus ===
Results in the 2025–26 season
Date	Event	SP		FS		Total	
Date	Event	P	Score	P	Score	P	Score
Jan 21–24, 2026	(Belarus) 2026 Belarusian Championships	1	69.69	1	136.85	1	206.54

2024–25 season
Date	Event	SP	FS	Total
17–18 January 2025	2025 Belarusian Championships	1; 69.59	1; 132.27	1; 201.86
2023–24 season
Date	Event	SP	FS	Total
16–17 December 2023	2024 Belarusian Championships	1; 64.24	1; 128.17	1; 192.41
2022–23 season
Date	Event	SP	FS	Total
15–18 December 2022	2022 Belarus Open Championships	1; 67.83	1; 134.55	1; 202.38
2021–22 season
Date	Event	SP	FS	Total
15–17 February 2022	2022 Winter Olympics	16; 61.46	12; 123.37	12; 184.83
10–16 January 2022	2022 European Championships	8; 63.07	8; 122.34	9; 185.41
16–19 December 2021	2021 Belarus Open Championships	1; 69.21	1; 131.81	1; 201.02
26–28 November 2021	2021 Rostelecom Cup	9; 58.19	6; 127.45	7; 185.64
28–31 October 2021	2021 Denis Ten Memorial	1; 66.67	1; 123.39	1; 190.06
14–18 October 2021	2021 Ice Star	1; 68.68	1; 129.40	1; 198.08
7–10 October 2021	2021 CS Finlandia Trophy	9; 64.26	9; 123.57	8; 187.83
22–25 September 2021	2021 CS Nebelhorn Trophy	3; 62.02	3; 128.27	3; 190.29
2020–21 season
Date	Event	SP	FS	Total
22–28 March 2021	2021 World Championships	WD	WD	WD
11–13 December 2020	2020 Winter Star (Belarusian Championships)	1; 67.79	1; 126.56	1; 194.35
20–22 November 2020	2020 Rostelecom Cup	7; 64.25	7; 120.32	8; 184.57
29 Oct. – 1 Nov. 2020	2020 Ice Star	3; 66.56	1; 134.10	1; 200.66
2019–20 season
Date	Event	SP	FS	Total
13–16 February 2020	2020 Tallink Hotels Cup	3; 62.23	2; 114.82	3; 177.05
20–26 January 2020	2020 European Championships	20; 53.33	13; 106.58	14; 159.91
14–15 December 2019	2020 Belarusian Championships	2; 60.42	1; 120.52	1; 180.94
4–7 December 2019	2019 CS Golden Spin of Zagreb	2; 64.35	2; 128.14	2; 192.49
14–17 November 2019	2019 CS Warsaw Cup	7; 55.55	7; 115.88	7; 171.43
5–10 November 2019	2019 Volvo Open Cup	2; 64.19	1; 117.69	1; 181.88

=== For Russia ===
2018–19 season
Date	Event	SP	FS	Total
31 Jan. – 4 Feb. 2019	2019 Russian Junior Championships	8; 69.25	9; 122.20	8; 191.45
18–21 October 2018	2018 Ice Star	1; 61.60	1; 112.47	1; 174.07
2017–18 season
23–26 January 2018	2018 Russian Junior Championships	15; 60.40	13; 116.94	14; 177.34
