= Milana Ramashova =

Belarusian figure skater

Personal information
- Native name: Мілана Максімаўна Рамашова (Belarusian)
- Full name: Milana Maksimauna Ramashova
- Other names: Romashova
- Born: 12 September 2005 (age 20) Byaroza, Belarus
- Home town: Sochi, Russia
- Height: 1.49 m (4 ft 10 1/2 in)

Figure skating career
- Country: Belarus
- Coach: Olga Uvazhanaia; Alexei Urmanov
- Began skating: 2009
Medal record
Belarusian Championships
Silver medal – second place	2022 Minsk	Singles
Silver medal – second place	2020 Minsk	Singles

Milana Maksimauna Ramashova (Belarusian: Мілана Максімаўна Рамашова; born 12 September 2005) is a Belarusian figure skater. She is the 2020 and 2022 Belarusian national silver medalist and a two-time Belarusian junior national champion (2019, 2020). She finished 12th at the 2020 World Junior Championships.

== Personal life ==
Ramashova was born on 12 September 2005 in Byaroza to Lyudmila and Maksim Ramashov. Her father is a construction worker who used to play for FC Bereza-2010 and her mother was a competitive gymnast. Ramashova has an older brother who plays ice hockey. She has two cats, one of whom is named Button. Ramashova has stated that in the future, she wishes to be a skating coach.

== Career ==
=== Early career ===
Ramashova's parents had her start skating in her hometown of Byaroza at the age of four so she would get sick less often. A coach recommended that the family start training in Pruzhany, 40 kilometers away, as there was no sport school in Byaroza.

In 2013, Ramashova began working with her current coach, Olga Uvazhanaia. Several injuries, including a broken arm and a sprained ankle, forced her off the ice for most of 2014, but she recovered to attend the camp of Russian coach Ilia Kalashnikov in Sochi, Russia at the end of the year. Following the camp, Ramashova and her family were impressed with the Russian training system. In 2018, they relocated to Sochi for her to train in Alexei Urmanov's group at the Iceberg Skating Palace in the Sochi Olympic Park.

Ramashova won the 2019 Belarusian junior national title ahead of Aliaksandra Chepeleva and Nastassia Sidarenka. She looks up to Russian skaters Alina Zagitova and Alena Kostornaia.

=== 2019–2020 season ===
Ramashova made her junior international debut on the Junior Grand Prix series, finishing 16th in Chelyabinsk and 12th in Gdańsk. In October, she finished 7th at Ice Star in Minsk. At the 2020 Belarusian Championships in December, Ramashova won silver on the senior level behind Viktoriia Safonova and ahead of Nastassia Sidarenka. She then finished fourth at the Mentor Toruń Cup in January.

In February, Ramashova defended her title at the 2020 Belarusian Junior Championships ahead of Anastasiya Balykina and Darya Kapskaya. Her result qualified her for the 2020 World Junior Championships. Ramashova qualified for the final segment at Junior Worlds and finished 12th overall, after placing 12th in the short program and 11th in the free skating, despite not performing a triple flip or triple Lutz jump. She is the first Belarusian lady to qualify for the final segment at the World Junior Championships.

=== 2020–2021 season ===
Due to the COVID-19 pandemic, the International Skating Union cancelled the Junior Grand Prix, where the senior-ineligible Ramashova would have competed. She opened her season in October at the 2020 Ice Star, winning silver behind Varvara Kisel and ahead of Lizaveta Balonikova.

=== 2021–2022 season ===
Milana finished 11th at the Junior Grand Prix in Slovenia and 8th in Poland. She went onto finish 4th at the 2021 Ice Star. She finished her season by finishing 6th at the 2021 Ice Challenge, garnering new season best scores in the free skate and overall.

In March 2022, the International Skating Union banned Russian and Belarusian athletes from competing in international competitions following the Russian invasion of Ukraine.

=== 2022–2023 season ===
Ramashova competed at the 2023 Belarusian Championships and placed 9th in the short program scoring 43.41 points. She withdrew from the free skate segment.

== Programs ==
Season	Short program	Free skating
2021–2022		Je suis malade performed by Lara Fabian choreo. by Oleg Purtov
2020–2021		
2019–2020	Due Soldi (from Liquidation) choreo. by Oleg Purtov	La campanella by Franz Liszt performed by David Garrett choreo. by Oleg Purtov

== Competitive highlights ==
CS: Challenger Series; JGP: Junior Grand Prix

International: Senior
Event	18–19	19–20	20–21	21–22
CS Cup of Austria				6th
Ice Star				4th
Sofia Trophy				WD
Winter Star				2nd
International: Junior
Junior Worlds		12th		
JGP Poland		12th		8th
JGP Russia		16th		
JGP Slovenia				11th
Ice Star		7th	2nd	
Toruń Cup		4th		
National
Belarusian Champ.		2nd	3rd	2nd
Belarusian Junior	1st	1st		
TBD = Assigned; WD = Withdrew

== Detailed results ==
Small medals for short and free programs awarded only at ISU Championships.

=== Senior results ===
2022–2023 season
Date	Event	SP	FS	Total
15-18 December 2022	2023 Belarusian Championships	9 43.41	WD	WD
2021–2022 season
Date	Event	SP	FS	Total
11-14 November 2021	2021 CS Cup of Austria	18; 46.53	5; 108.77	6; 155.30
14-18 October 2021	2021 Ice Star	4; 48.47	4; 90.47	4; 138.94
2019–2020 season
Date	Event	SP	FS	Total
14-15 December 2019	2020 Belarusian Championships	1; 60.87	2; 96.09	2; 156.96

=== Junior results ===
2021–2022 season
Date	Event	SP	FS	Total
29 Sept - 2 Oct 2021	2021 JGP Poland	8; 48.68	8; 95.01	8; 143.69
22-25 September 2021	2021 JGP Slovenia	10; 50.02	11; 93.14	11; 143.16
2020–2021 season
Date	Event	SP	FS	Total
29 Oct - 1 Nov 2020	2020 Ice Star	2; 58.70	2; 92.34	2; 151.04
2019–2020 season
Date	Event	SP	FS	Total
2-8 March 2020	2020 World Junior Championships	12; 59.65	11; 109.51	12; 169.12
3-5 February 2020	2020 Belarusian Junior Championships	2; 45.17	1; 88.25	1; 133.42
7-12 January 2020	2020 Mentor Toruń Cup	1; 54.88	4; 91.07	4; 145.95
29 Oct - 1 Nov 2019	2019 Ice Star	12; 43.25	5; 96.81	7; 140.06
18-21 September 2019	2019 JGP Poland	12; 52.27	12; 90.40	12; 142.67
11–14 September 2019	2019 JGP Russia	16; 46.06	12; 90.56	16; 136.62
2018–2019 season
Date	Event	SP	FS	Total
6-8 February 2019	2019 Belarusian Junior Championships	2; 45.17	1; 88.25	1; 133.42
