= Belarusian Figure Skating Championships =

Recurring figure skating competition

- Status: Active
- Genre: National championships
- Frequency: Annual
- Venue: Minsk-Arena
- Location: Minsk
- Country: Belarus
- Inaugurated: 1992
- Organiser: Skating Union of Belarus

The Belarusian Figure Skating Championships are an annual figure skating competition organized by the Skating Union of Belarus (Russian: Белорусский союз конькобежце) to crown the national champions of Belarus. Medals are awarded in men's singles, women's singles, pair skating, and ice dance at the senior and junior levels, although every discipline may not necessarily be held every year due to a lack of participants.

== Senior medalists ==
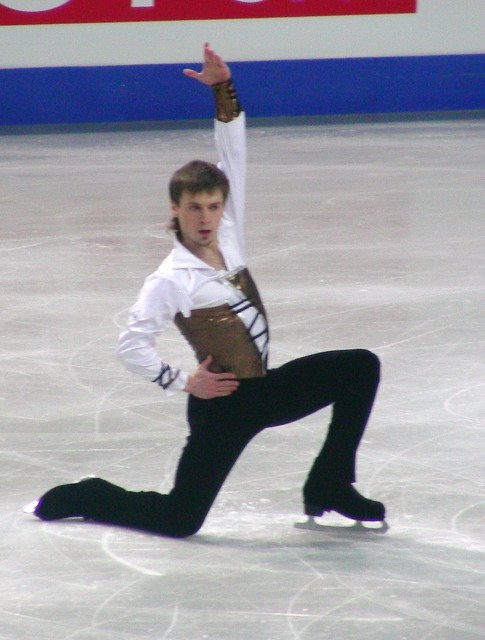
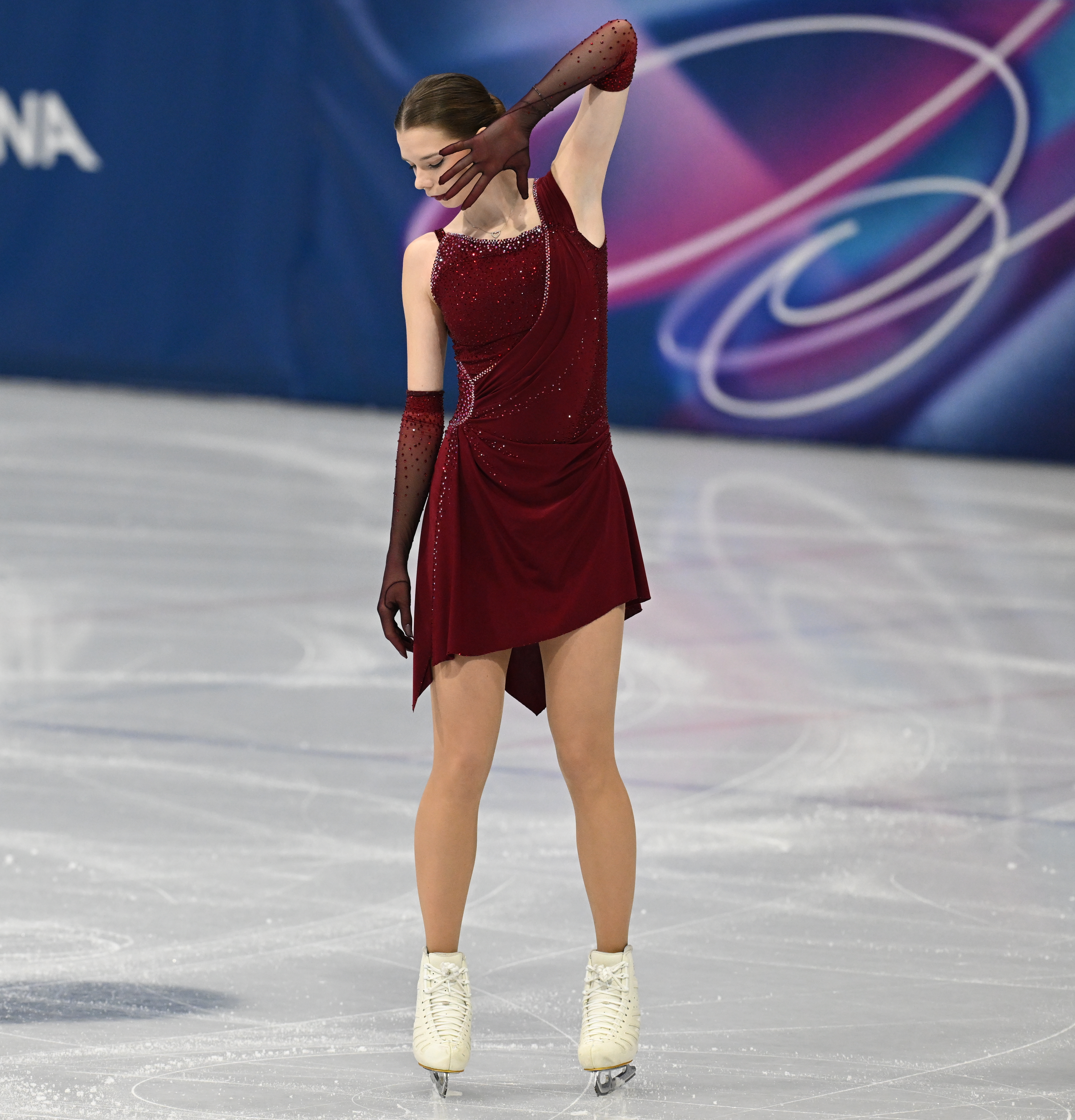
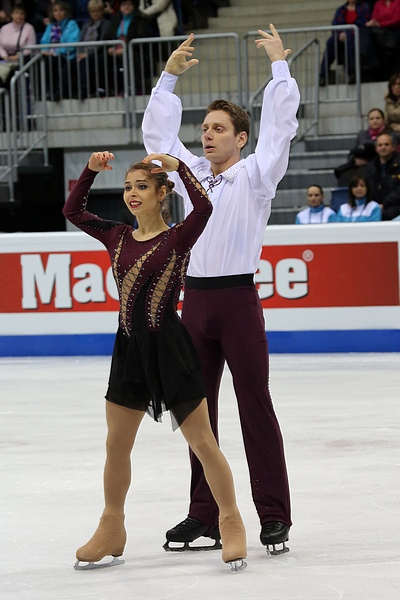
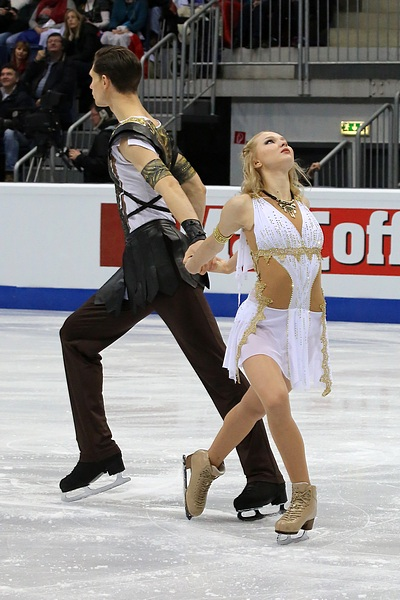
From left to right: Sergei Davydov, eight-time Belarusian champion in men's singles; Viktoriia Safonova, seven-time Belarusian champion in women's singles; Tatiana Danilova and Mikalai Kamianchuk, two-time Belarusian champions in pair skating; and Viktoria Kavaliova and Yurii Bieliaiev, five-time Belarusian champions in ice dance

=== Men's singles ===
Men's event medalists
Year	Location	Gold	Silver	Bronze	Ref.
1992	Minsk	Alexander Murashko			
1993	Minsk	Alexander Murashko			
1994	Minsk	Alexander Murashko			
1995	Minsk	Alexander Murashko			
1996	Minsk	Alexander Murashko			
1997	Minsk	Alexander Murashko			
1998	Minsk				
1999	Minsk				
2000	Minsk				
2001	Minsk	Sergei Davydov	Igor Rolinski	Sergei Shiliaev	
2002	Minsk	Sergei Davydov		Sergei Shiliaev	
2003	Minsk	Sergei Davydov	Sergei Shiliaev	Dmitri Malochnikov	
2004	Minsk	Sergei Davydov	Sergei Shiliaev	Pavel Kersha	
2005	Minsk	Sergei Davydov	Alexandr Kazakov	Sergei Shiliaev	
2006	Minsk	Sergei Davydov	Alexandr Kazakov	Sergei Shiliaev	
2007	Minsk	Sergei Davydov	Alexandr Kazakov		
2008	Minsk	Sergei Davydov	Alexandr Kazakov	Dmitri Kagirov	
2009	Minsk	Alexandr Kazakov	Dmitri Kagirov	Mikhail Karaliuk	
2010	Minsk	Alexandr Kazakov	Pavel Ignatenko	Vitali Luchanok	
2011	Minsk	Vitali Luchanok	Alexei Mialionkhin	Mikhail Karaliuk	
2012	Minsk	Mikhail Karaliuk	Vitali Luchanok	Dmitri Kagirov	
2013	Minsk	Pavel Ignatenko	Mikhail Koroliuk	Dmitri Kagirov	
2014	Minsk	Pavel Ignatenko	Mikhail Koroliuk	Vitali Luchanok	
2015	Minsk	Pavel Ignatenko	Anton Karpuk	Vitali Luchanok	
2016	Minsk	Alexei Mialionkhin	Pavel Ignatenko	Yakau Zenko	
2017	Minsk	Anton Karpuk	Alexei Mialionkhin	Evgeni Puzanov	
2018	Minsk	Yakau Zenko	Anton Karpuk	Evgeni Puzanov	
2019	Minsk	Yakau Zenko	Evgeni Puzanov	Mikalai Kazlou	
2020	Minsk	Evgeni Puzanov	Alexander Lebedev	Konstantin Milyukov	
2021	Minsk	Konstantin Milyukov	Evgeni Puzanov	Mikalai Kazlou	
2022	Minsk	Konstantin Milyukov	Vasil Barakhouski	Mikalai Kazlou	
2023	Minsk	Alexander Lebedev	Vasil Barakhouski	Evgeni Puzanov	
2024	Minsk	Evgeni Puzanov	Alexander Lebedev	Vasil Barakhouski	
2025	Minsk	Evgeni Puzanov	Vasil Barakhouski	Georgij Kozlovskij	
2026	Minsk	Vasil Barakhouski	Georgij Kozlovskij	Evgeni Puzanov	

=== Women's singles ===
Women's event medalists
Year	Location	Gold	Silver	Bronze	Ref.
1993	Minsk	Inna Ovsiannikova			
1994	Minsk	Inna Ovsiannikova			
1995	Minsk	Maria Nikitochkina			
1996	Minsk				
1997	Minsk				
1998	Minsk				
1999	Minsk				
2000	Minsk				
2001	Minsk	Julia Soldatova	Jana Zarovskaya	Kristina Mikhailova	
2002	Minsk	Julia Soldatova			
2003	Minsk	Evgenia Melnik	Kristina Mikhailova	Valeria Yaroshevich	
2004	Minsk	Evgenia Melnik	Julia Sheremet	Kristina Mikhailova	
2005	Minsk	Evgenia Melnik	Julia Sheremet	Kristina Mikhailova	
2006	Minsk	Julia Sheremet	Kristina Mikhailova	Yuna Drobyshevskaya	
2007	Minsk	Kristina Mikhailova	Julia Sheremet		
2008	Minsk	Julia Sheremet	Victoria Liahova	Ekaterina Pakhamovich	
2009	Minsk	Victoria Liahova	Julia Sheremet	Ekaterina Pakhamovich	
2010	Minsk	Ekaterina Pakhamovich	Victoria Liahova	Anastasia Gribko	
2011	Minsk	Nastassia Hrybko	Kseniya Bakusheva	Victoria Liahova	
2012	Minsk	Kristina Zakharanka	Kseniya Bakusheva	Victoria Liahova	
2013	Minsk	Kristina Zakharanka	Victoria Liahova	Janina Makeenka	
2014	Minsk	Darya Batura	Janina Makeenka	Kseniya Bakusheva	
2015	Minsk	Janina Makeenka	Elizaveta Avsyukevich	Darya Batura	
2016	Minsk	Janina Makeenka	Darya Batura	Mariya Saldakaeva	
2017	Minsk	Hanna Paroshina	Elizaveta Malinovskaya	Janina Makeenka	
2018	Minsk	Aliaksandra Chepeleva	Maryia Saldakayeva	Elizaveta Malinovskaya	
2019	Minsk	Aliaksandra Chepeleva	Maryia Saldakayeva	Lizaveta Khlypauka	
2020	Minsk	Viktoriia Safonova	Milana Ramashova	Nastassia Sidarenka	
2021	Minsk	Viktoriia Safonova	Varvara Kisel	Milana Ramashova	
2022	Minsk	Viktoriia Safonova	Milana Ramashova	Aliaksandra Chepeleva	
2023	Minsk	Viktoriia Safonova	Valeriya Ezhova	Anastasiya Makarova	
2024	Minsk	Viktoriia Safonova	Valeriya Ezhova	Elizaveta Pikulik	
2025	Minsk	Viktoriia Safonova	Elizaveta Pikulik	Elizaveta Kostyuk	
2026	Minsk	Viktoriia Safonova	Varvara Stahovich	Yaroslava Knyazeva	

=== Pairs ===
Pairs event medalists
Year	Location	Gold	Silver	Bronze	Ref.
1993	Minsk				
1994	Minsk	Yelena Grigoryeva / Sergey Sheyko			
1995	Minsk				
1996	Minsk				
1997	Minsk				
1998	Minsk				
1999	Minsk				
2000	Minsk				
2001	Minsk	Alexandra Ivanova; Evgeni Kapitulets	No other competitors		
2002–05	Minsk	No pairs competitors			
2006	Minsk	Anastasia Savrilskaya; Nikolai Kamenchuk	No other competitors		
2007–08	Minsk	No pairs competitors			
2009	Minsk	Alexandra Tetenko; Nikolai Kamenchuk	No other competitors		
2010	Minsk	Lubov Bakirova; Mikalai Kamianchuk	No other competitors		
2011	Minsk	Lubov Bakirova; Mikalai Kamianchuk	Maria Paliakova; Mikhail Fomichev	No other competitors	
2012	Minsk	Lubov Bakirova; Mikalai Kamianchuk	Maria Paliakova; Mikhail Fomichev	No other competitors	
2013	Minsk	Maria Paliakova; Nikita Bochkov	No other competitors		
2014	Minsk	Maria Paliakova; Nikita Bochkov	No other competitors		
2015	Minsk	Maria Paliakova; Nikita Bochkov	Tatiana Danilova; Mikalai Kamianchuk	No other competitors	
2016	Minsk	Tatiana Danilova; Mikalai Kamianchuk	No other competitors		
2017	Minsk	Tatiana Danilova; Mikalai Kamianchuk	No other competitors		
2018–20	Minsk	No pairs competitors			
2021	Minsk	Bogdana Lukashevich; Alexander Stepanov	No other competitors		
2022	Minsk	Bogdana Lukashevich; Alexander Stepanov	Ekaterina Iurova; Dmitry Bushlanov	No other competitors	
2023	Minsk	Bogdana Lukashevich; Alexander Stepanov	Ekaterina Iurova; Dmitry Bushlanov	No other competitors	
2024–26	Minsk	No pairs competitors			

=== Ice dance ===
Ice dance event medalists
Year	Location	Gold	Silver	Bronze	Ref.
1993	Minsk				
1994	Minsk	Tatiana Navka / Samvel Gezalian			
1995	Minsk				
1996	Minsk				
1997	Minsk	Tatiana Navka / Nikolai Morozov			
1998	Minsk	Tatiana Navka / Nikolai Morozov			
1999	Minsk				
2000	Minsk				
2001	Minsk	Alissa de Carbonnel; Alexander Malkov	No other competitors		
2002	Minsk	Alissa de Carbonnel; Alexander Malkov	No other competitors		
2003	Minsk	Anna Galchenyuk; Alexandr Cherniayev	No other competitors		
2004	Minsk	Anna Galchenyuk; Oleg Krupen	Veronika Stepchenkova; Sergei Plishkin	No other competitors	
2005	Minsk	Anna Galchenyuk; Oleg Krupen	Veronika Stepchenkova; Sergei Plishkin	Aleksandra Maksimova; Yahor Maistrov	
2006	Minsk	Julia Tereshenko; Oleg Krupen	Aleksandra Maksimova; Yahor Maistrov	Azaliya Mazynskaya; Sergei Plishkin	
2007	Minsk	Evgenia Melnik; Oleg Krupen	Aleksandra Maksimova; Yahor Maistrov		
2008	Minsk	Ksenia Shmyrina; Yahor Maistrov	Evgenia Melnik; Oleg Krupen	Hanna Asadchaya; Dmitry Lamtiugin	
2009	Minsk	Ksenia Shmyrina; Yahor Maistrov	No other competitors		
2010	Minsk	Lesia Valadzenkava; Vitali Vakunov	Viktoria Kavaliova; Yurii Bieliaiev	No other competitors	
2011	Minsk	Lesia Valadzenkava; Vitali Vakunov	Viktoria Kavaliova; Yurii Bieliaiev	Hanna Asadchaya; Sergei Plishkin	
2012	Minsk	Lesia Valadzenkava; Vitali Vakunov	Viktoria Kavaliova; Yurii Bieliaiev	No other competitors	
2013	Minsk	Lesia Valadzenkava; Vitali Vakunov	Viktoria Kavaliova; Yurii Bieliaiev	No other competitors	
2014	Minsk	Viktoria Kavaliova; Yurii Bieliaiev	Lesia Volodenkova; Vitali Vakunov	Kristina Kaunatskaya; Yan Lukovskij	
2015	Minsk	Viktoria Kavaliova; Yurii Bieliaiev	Kristina Kaunatskaya; Yan Lukovskij	Violetta Shostak; Pavel Sokolov	
2016	Minsk	Viktoria Kavaliova; Yurii Bieliaiev	No other competitors		
2017	Minsk	Viktoria Kavaliova; Yurii Bieliaiev	Kristina Kaunatskaya; Yuri Hulitski	Adelina Zvezdova; Uladzimir Zaitsau	
2018	Minsk	Viktoria Kavaliova; Yurii Bieliaiev	Anna Kublikova; Yuri Hulitski	No other competitors	
2019	Minsk	Anna Kublikova; Yuri Hulitski	Emilia Kolleganova; Vladislav Polhovskij	Karina Sidorenka; Maxim Yalenich	
2020	Minsk	Yuliya Zhata; Yan Lukouski	Emilia Kolleganova; Vladislav Polhovskij	Viktoria Semenjuk; Ilya Yukhimuk	
2021	Minsk	Viktoria Semenjuk; Ilya Yukhimuk	Karina Sidorenka; Maxim Yalenich	No other competitors	
2022	Minsk	Viktoria Semenjuk; Ilya Yukhimuk	Elizaveta Novik; Oleksandr Kukharevskyi	Karina Sidorenka; Maxim Yalenich	
2023	Minsk	Karina Sidorenka; Maxim Yalenich	Elizaveta Novik; Oleksandr Kukharevskyi	No other competitors	
2024	Minsk	Ekaterina Andreeva; Dmitrij Blinov	Natal'ya Pozhivilko; Svyatoslav Verstakov	Elizaveta Novik; Oleksandr Kukharevskyi	
2025	Minsk	Ekaterina Andreeva; Dmitrij Blinov	Natal'ya Pozhivilko; Svyatoslav Verstakov	Alina Derkach; Andrej Petrukovich	
2026	Minsk	Ekaterina Andreeva; Dmitrij Blinov	Karolina Krasovskaya; Egor Tratsevskij	No other competitors	

== Junior medalists ==
=== Men's singles ===
Junior men's event medalists
Year	Location	Gold	Silver	Bronze	Ref.
2014	Minsk	Pavel Ignatenko	Anton Karpuk	Artsiom Tseluiko	
2015	Minsk	Anton Karpuk	Yakau Zenko	Artsiom Tseluiko	
2016	Minsk	Yakau Zenko	Anton Karpuk	Evgeni Puzanov	
2017	Minsk	Yakau Zenko	Mikalai Kazlou	Nikita Stepankov	
2018	Minsk	Yakau Zenko	Evgeni Puzanov	Mikalai Kazlou	
2019	Minsk	Evgeni Puzanov	Yakau Zenko	Mikalai Kazlou	
2020	Minsk	Evgeni Puzanov	Yakau Zenko	Mikalai Kazlou	
2021	Minsk	Alexander Lebedev	Evgeni Puzanov	Mikalai Kazlou	
2022	Minsk	Alexander Lebedev	Evgeni Puzanov	Mikalai Kazlou	
2023	Minsk	Vasilij Borohovskij	Nikolaj Kozlov	Aleksandr Labovich	
2024	Minsk	Vasilij Borohovskij	Pavel Gavdis	Mihail Labovich	
2025	Minsk	Vasilij Borohovskij	Georgij Kozlovskij	Pavel Gavdis	
2026	Minsk	Pavel Gavdis	Prohor Prusakov	No other competitors	

=== Women's singles ===
Junior women's event medalists
Year	Location	Gold	Silver	Bronze	Ref.
2014	Janina Makeenka	Alina Suponenko	Darya Batura		
2015	Darya Batura	Elizaveta Avsyukevich	Maria Bakusheva		
2016	Alina Suponenko	Anastasia Bozhenkova	Hanna Paroshina		
2017	Hanna Paroshina	Aliaksandra Chepeleva	Mariya Saldakaeva		
2018	Arina Gall-Savalskaya	Aliaksandra Chepeleva	Lizaveta Khlypauka		
2019	Milana Ramashova	Aliaksandra Chepeleva	Nastassia Sidarenka		
2020	Milana Ramashova	Aliaksandra Chepeleva	Nastassia Sidarenka		
2021	Varvara Kisel	Milana Ramashova	Kseniya Zhehulskaya		
2022	Anastasiya Makarova	Milana Ramashova	Varvara Kisel		
2023	Valeriya Ezhova	Zlata Omelyanyuk	Aliaksandra Malashka		
2024	Valeriya Ezhova	Elizaveta Kostyuk	Anna Kalinka		
2025	Alisa Gorislavskaya	Elizaveta Pikulik	Varvara Stahovich		
2026	Varvara Stahovich	Mariya Evtuhina	Yaroslava Knyazeva		

=== Pairs ===
Junior pairs event medalists
Year	Location	Gold	Silver	Bronze	Ref.
2014–17	No junior pairs competitors				
2018	Darya Ryabkova; Vladislav Gresko	No other competitors			
2019–21	No junior pairs competitors				
2022	Alina Gorina; Vladislav Saprykin	No other competitors			
2023	Nadin Vityaz'; Maksim Hritonenko	Margarita Voronovich; Vladislav Saprykin	No other competitors		
2024	Nadin Vityaz'; Maksim Hritonenko	Angelina Buraya; Vladislav Saprykin	No other competitors		
2025–26	No junior pairs competitors				

=== Ice dance ===
Junior ice dance event medalists
Year	Location	Gold	Silver	Bronze	Ref.
2014	Viktoria Kavaliova; Yurii Bieliaiev	Eugenia Tkachenka; Yuri Hulitski	Kristsina Kaunatskaia; Yan Lukouski		
2015	Emilia Kolleganova; Vladislav Polhovskij	Eugenia Tkachenka; Yuri Hulitski	Kristsina Kaunatskaia; Yan Lukouski		
2016	Maria Oleynik; Yuri Hulitski	Emilia Kolleganova; Vladislav Polhovskij	Polina Mishchanchuk; Vladimir Zaitsev		
2017	Emilia Kolleganova; Vladislav Polhovskij	Adelina Zvezdova; Vladimir Zaitsev	Karina Sidarenka; Maksim Yalenich		
2018	Karina Sidarenka; Maksim Yalenich	Elizaveta Novik; Ilia Drantusov	Yana Lapkes; Radion Ilyutko		
2019	Emilia Kolleganova; Vladislav Polhovskij	Karina Sidarenka; Maksim Yalenich	Natalya Pozhivilko; Ilya Drantusau		
2020	Emilia Kolleganova; Vladislav Polhovskij	Karina Sidarenka; Maksim Yalenich	Natalya Pozhivilko; Ilya Drantusau		
2021	Lizaveta Novik; Oleksandr Kukharevskyi	Snezhana Barmotina; Svyatoslav Verstakov	Natalya Pozhivilko; Ilya Drantusau		
2022	Ekaterina Andreeva; Ivan Desyatov	Zlata Martsishchanka; Vladislav Sytik	Natalya Pozhivilko; Svyatoslav Verstakov		
2023	Ekaterina Andreeva; Dmitrii Blinov	Natalya Pozhivilko; Svyatoslav Verstakov	Viktoriya Plaskonnaya; Vladislav Sytsik		
2024	Viktoriya Plaskonnaya; Vladislav Sytsik	Tat'Yana Hadarkevich; Yaroslav Sytsik	Karalina Krasouskaya; Yahor Tratsevski		
2025	Viktoriya Plaskonnaya; Vladislav Sytsik	Karalina Krasouskaya; Yahor Tratsevski	Varvara Ravgen'; Mihail Prusenkov		
2026	Viktoriya Plaskonnaya; Vladislav Sytsik	Ol'ga Grabovskaya; Yaroslav Sytsik	Varvara Ravgen'; Mihail Prusenkov		

== Records ==
Records
Discipline	Most championship titles			
Discipline	Skater(s)	No.	Years	Ref.
Men's singles	Sergei Davydov	8	2001-08	
Women's singles	Viktoriia Safonova	7	2020-26	
Pairs	Mikalai Kamianchuk (Note: Mikalai Kamianchuk won three championship titles while partnered with Lubov Bakirova (2010-12) and two with Tatiana Danilova (2016-17).)	5	2010-12; 2016-17	
Ice dance	Viktoria Kavaliova; Yurii Bieliaiev	5	2014-18	
