= Evgenia Melnik =

Belarusian figure skater

Evgenia Melnik (born 3 September 1988 in Minsk) is a Belarusian figure skater. She currently competes in ice dancing with partner Oleg Krupen. She previously competed as a single skater until the end of the 2005/2006 season.

== Competitive highlights ==
(single skating)
2005/2006

- Nebelhorn Trophy - 19th
- Ondrej Nepela Memorial - 21st

2004/2005

- European Championships - 32nd
- World Championships - 18th-Q
- Belarusian Championships - 1st
- Ukrainian Souvenir - 20th

2003/2004

- Junior Worlds - 24th
- Belarusian Championships - 1st
- Warsaw Cup - 1st J.
- Czech Skate - 16

2002/2003

- Junior Worlds - 22nd
- Belarusian Championships - 1st

2001/2002

- Belarusian Championships - 2nd
- European Youth Olympic Days - 13th

(Ice dancing)
2006/2007

- European Championships - 27th
- Winter Universiade - 12th
- Belarusian Championships - 1st
