= Alexander Lebedev (figure skater) =

Belarusian figure skater

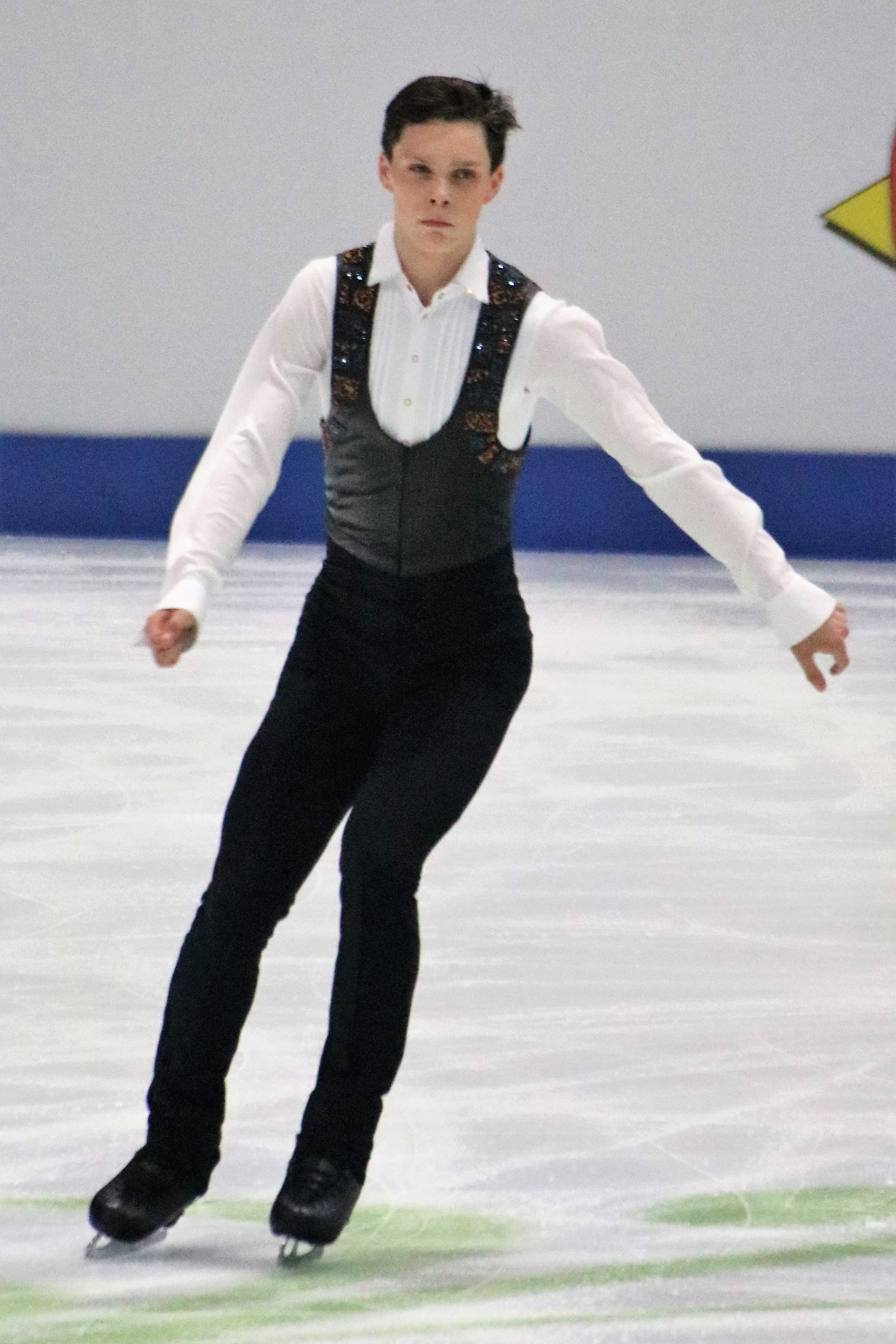
- Alexander Lebedev at the 2020 European Championships

Personal information
- Native name: Александр Валерьевич Лебедев (Russian); Аляксандр Валер'евіч Лебедзеў (Belarusian)
- Full name: Alexander Valerievich Lebedev
- Other names: Aleksandr
- Born: 24 July 2002 (age 24) Seversk, Russia
- Home town: Vitebsk, Belarus
- Height: 1.85 m (6 ft 1 in)

Figure skating career
- Country: Belarus
- Coach: Julia Solovieva; Viktor Kudriavtsev; Sergey Chemodanov
- Skating club: Olympic Reserve School
- Began skating: 2007

Medal record
Belarusian Championships
Gold medal – first place	2023 Minsk	Singles
Silver medal – second place	2020 Minsk	Singles
Silver medal – second place	2024 Minsk	Singles

Alexander Valerievich Lebedev (Russian: Александр Валерьевич Лебедев; Belarusian: Аляксандр Валер'евіч Лебедзеў; born 24 July 2002) is a Russian-born figure skater who competes for Belarus. He is the 2020 Belarusian national silver medalist, the 2019 Skate Victoria silver medalist, and the 2019 Jégvirág Cup bronze medalist. Lebedev has competed in the final segment at two ISU Championships – the 2020 European Championships and the 2020 World Junior Championships.

== Programs ==
Season	Short program	Free skating
2020–2021	E lucevan le stelle (from Tosca) Giacomo Puccini choreo. by Natalia Bestemianova	Once Upon a Time in Mexico by Robert Rodriguez choreo. by Igor Bobrin
2019–2020	E lucevan le stelle (from Tosca) Giacomo Puccini choreo. by Natalia Bestemianova	Once Upon a Time in Mexico by Robert Rodriguez choreo. by Igor Bobrin

== Competitive highlights ==
- GP – Event of the ISU Grand Prix Series
- JGP – Event of the ISU Junior Grand Prix Series
- CS – Event of the ISU Challenger Series
- WD – Withdrew from competition

Competition placements at senior level
Season	2018–19	2019–20	2020–21	2021–22	2022–23	2023–24
European Championships		22nd				
Belarusian Championships		2nd			1st	2nd
Lithuanian Championships (Note: Lebedev competed as a guest skater.)	1st					
GP Rostelecom Cup			12th			
CS Cup of Austria				WD		
CS Ice Star		9th	4th	3rd		
CS Tallinn Trophy	14th					
CS Warsaw Cup		19th				
Bosphorus Cup		5th				
Egna Spring Trophy	9th					
Jégvirág Cup	3rd					
Skate Victoria	2nd					
Tallink Hotels Cup	5th	5th				
Volvo Open Cup	5th					
Winter Star				2nd		

Competition placements at junior level
Season	2019–20	2020–21	2021–22
World Junior Championships	23rd		
Belarusian Championships	1st	1st	1st
JGP Austria			12th
JGP Poland	12th		
JGP Russia	8th		10th

== Detailed results ==
=== Senior level ===
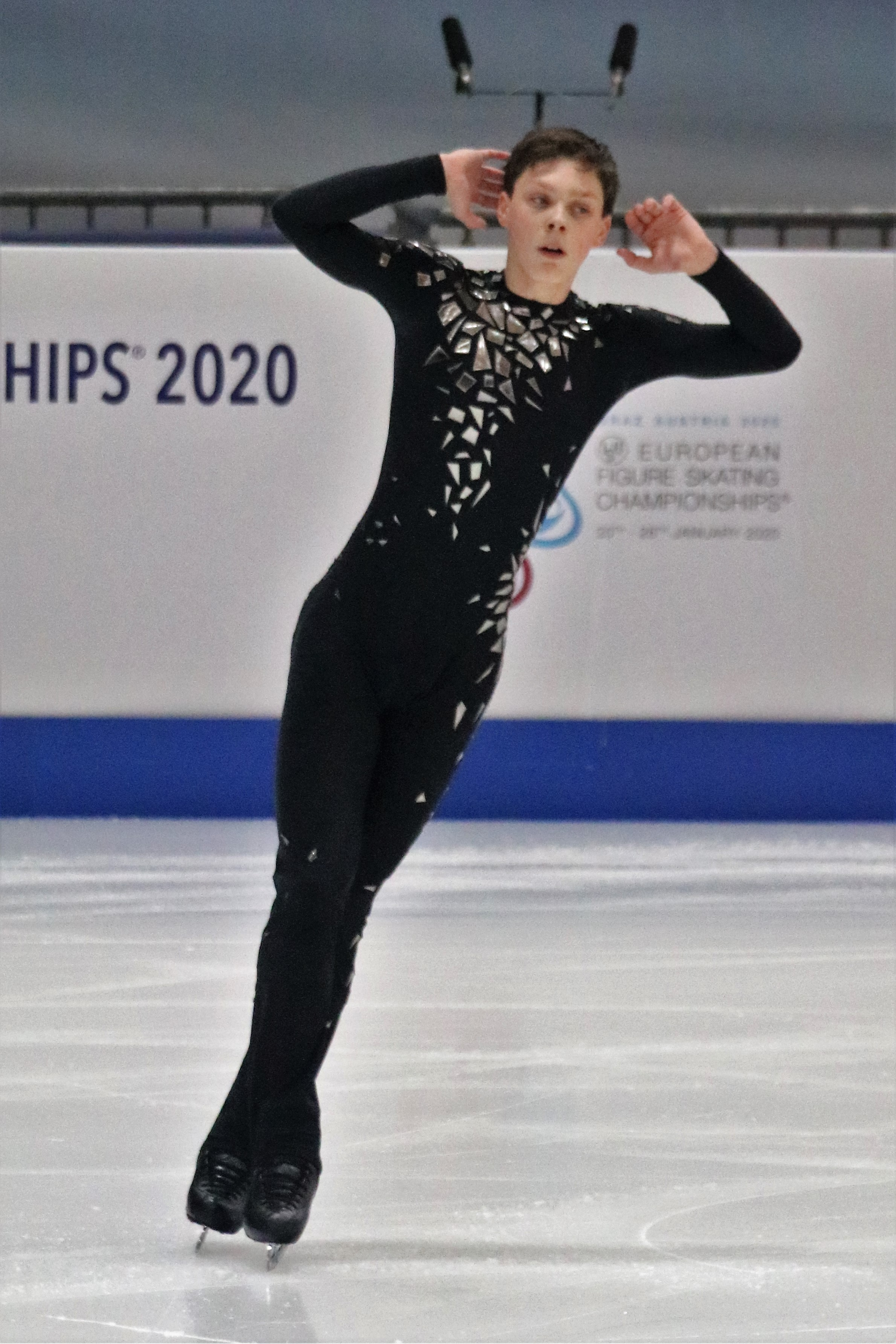
Lebedev at the 2020 European Championships

2021–2022 season
Date	Event	SP	FS	Total
November 11–14, 2021	2021 CS Cup of Austria			
2020–2021 season
Date	Event	SP	FS	Total
20–22 November 2020	2020 Rostelecom Cup	12; 62.88	12; 119.42	12; 182.30
29 Oct. – 1 Nov. 2020	2020 Ice Star	4; 70.65	4; 134.11	4; 204.76
2019–2020 season
Date	Event	SP	FS	Total
13–16 February 2020	2020 Tallink Hotels Cup	7; 66.26	4; 134.73	5; 200.99
20–26 January 2020	2020 European Championships	21; 66.43	22; 122.57	22; 188.00
14–15 December 2019	2020 Belarusian Championships	2; 65.62	2; 125.94	2; 191.56
25–30 November 2019	2019 Bosphorus Cup	3; 68.98	5; 123.79	5; 192.77
14–17 November 2019	2019 CS Warsaw Cup	20; 54.96	19; 103.43	19; 158.39
18–20 October 2019	2019 CS Ice Star	9; 61.89	8; 119.16	9; 181.05
2018–2019 season
Date	Event	SP	FS	Total
9–14 April 2019	2019 Skate Victoria	5; 60.19	2; 124.21	2; 184.40
28–31 March 2019	2019 Egna Spring Trophy	13; 53.76	7; 113.84	9; 167.60
22–24 February 2019	2019 Tallink Hotels Cup	4; 63.39	5; 108.66	5; 172.05
15–17 February 2019	2019 Jégvirág Cup	5; 57.15	2; 110.53	3; 167.68
1–2 December 2018	2019 Lithuanian Championships	1; 53.69	1 -1.00	1; 52.69
26–29 November 2018	2018 CS Tallinn Trophy	15; 57.34	14; 116.08	14; 173.42
6–11 November 2018	2018 Volvo Open Cup	8; 60.62	3; 131.10	5; 191.72

=== Junior results ===
2020–2021 season
Date	Event	SP	FS	Total
23–24 January 2021	2021 Belarusian Junior Championships	1; 70.88	1; 131.44	1; 202.32
2019–2020 season
Date	Event	SP	FS	Total
2–8 March 2020	2020 World Junior Championships	19; 66.12	23; 97.28	23; 163.40
3–5 February 2020	2020 Belarusian Junior Championships	1; 70.60	1; 126.75	1; 197.35
18–21 September 2019	2019 JGP Poland	10; 61.94	13; 99.77	12; 161.71
11–14 September 2019	2019 JGP Russia	6; 62.76	9; 110.32	8; 173.08
