= Ilya Yukhimuk =

Belarusian ice dancer

Personal information
- Native name: Ілля Юр'евіч Юхімук (Belarusian)
- Full name: Ilya Yurievich Yukhimuk
- Other names: Ilia
- Born: 18 February 1997 (age 29) Brest, Belarus
- Home town: Brest
- Height: 1.79 m (5 ft 10 1/2 in)

Figure skating career
- Country: Belarus
- Partner: Viktoria Semenjuk
- Coach: Tatiana Beliaeva
- Skating club: Hockey Club Brest
- Began skating: 2001

Ilya Yurievich Yukhimuk (Belarusian: Ілля Юр'евіч Юхімук; born 18 February 1997) is a Belarusian ice dancer. With his skating partner, Viktoria Semenjuk, he has won five senior international medals and is the 2021 Belarusian national champion.

Earlier in his career, he competed for China with Feng Yuhan.

== Programs ==
With Semenjuk

Season	Rhythm dance	Free dance
2021–2022	Skin by Rag'n'Bone Man; Runaway Baby by Bruno Mars choreo. by Alexander Tolstik, Anastasia Shurkina	Malagueña by Ernesto Lecuona choreo. by Alexander Tolstik, Anastasia Shurkina
2020–2021	'S Wonderful (from Funny Face) by George & Ira Gershwin choreo. by Christopher Dean, Benjamin Agosto	Cloud Pusher by Ninja Tracks; Assano Seppuku; Oishi's Tale (from 47 Ronin) by Ilan Eshkeri; Kill the Fear by Superhuman choreo. by Alexander Tolstik, Anastasia Shurkina

== Competitive highlights ==
GP: Grand Prix; CS: Challenger Series

With Semenjuk

International
Event	19–20	20–21	21–22
Worlds		28th	
Europeans			22nd
GP Rostelecom Cup		10th	
CS Denis Ten Memorial			4th
CS Golden Spin			WD
CS Nebelhorn Trophy			WD
CS Warsaw Cup		C	12th
Ice Star		1st	1st
LuMi Dance Trophy		2nd	
Santa Claus Cup		WD	
Spring Star		1st	
Winter Star		3rd	
National
Belarusian Champ.	WD		1st

Men's singles

International: Junior
Event	13–14
Ice Star	6th
National
Belarusian Junior	6th A

== Detailed results ==
ISU Personal Bests highlighted in bold.

With Semenjuk

**2021–22 season**
Date	Event	RD	FD	Total
22–25 September 2021	2021 CS Nebelhorn Trophy	WD	WD	WD
14–17 October 2021	2021 Ice star	1; 68.54	1; 103.07	1; 171.61
27–31 October 2021	2021 CS Denis Ten Memorial	4; 63.07	4; 93.19	4; 156.26
18–20 November 2021	2021 CS Warsaw Cup	14; 60.99	12; 95.39	12; 156.38
16–19 December 2021	Belarus Open Championship 2021	1; 70.71	1; 104.36	1; 175.07
2020–21 season
Date	Event	RD	FD	Total
9–11 April 2021	2021 Spring Star	1; 66.35	1; 99.02	1; 165.37
22–28 March 2021	2021 World Championships	28; 51.15	-	28; 51.15
10–13 February 2021	2021 LuMi Dance Trophy	2; 66.10	2; 94.15	2; 160.25
11–13 December 2020	2021 Belarusian Championships	1; 68.68	1; 98.88	1; 167.56
11–13 December 2020	2020 Winter Star	3; 68.68	3; 98.88	3; 167.56
20–22 November 2020	2020 Rostelecom Cup	10; 56.22	10; 90.16	10; 146.38
29 Oct – 1 November 2020	2020 Ice Star	1; 60.48	1; 91.37	1; 151.85
2019–20 season
Date	Event	RD	FD	Total
14–15 December 2019	2020 Belarusian Championships	1; 64.44	WD	WD
