= Viktoria Semenjuk =

Estonian ice dancer

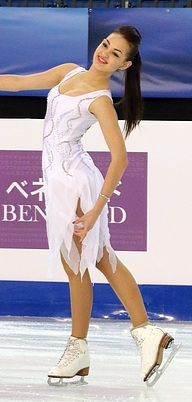

Personal information
- Native name: Виктория Витальевна Семенюк (Russian)
- Full name: Viktoria Vitaliyevna Semenjuk
- Other names: Viktoriya Semenyuk; Viktorija Semenjuk
- Born: 13 March 2001 (age 25) Tallinn, Estonia
- Height: 1.67 m (5 ft 5 1/2 in)

Figure skating career
- Country: Belarus
- Partner: Ilya Yukhimuk
- Coach: Tatiana Beliaeva
- Skating club: Tallinn FSC
- Began skating: 2005

Viktoria Vitaliyevna Semenjuk (Russian: Виктория Витальевна Семенюк; born 13 March 2001) is a Belarusian-Estonian ice dancer. She is currently paired with Ilya Yukhimuk representing Belarus, where they are the 2021 Belarusian national champion.

Representing Estonia with her former skating partner, Artur Gruzdev, she has competed in the final segment at two World Junior Championships (2018, 2019). They placed tenth at the 2016 Winter Youth Olympics.

== Programs ==
With Yukhimuk

| Season | Rhythm dance | Free dance |
|---|---|---|
| 2021–2022 | Skin by Rag'n'Bone Man; Runaway Baby by Bruno Mars choreo. by Alexander Tolstik, Anastasia Shurkina, Christopher Dean | Malagueña by Ernesto Lecuona choreo. by Benjamin Agosto |
| 2020–2021 | 'S Wonderful (from Funny Face) by George & Ira Gershwin choreo. by Christopher Dean | Cloud Pusher by Ninja Tracks; Assano Seppuku; Oishi's Tale (from 47 Ronin) by Ilan Eshkeri; Kill the Fear by Superhuman choreo. by Benjamin Agosto |

With Gruzdev

| Season | Rhythm dance | Free dance |
|---|---|---|
| 2018–2019 | Tango: Adiós Nonino by Astor Piazzolla choreo. by Lea Rand | Ghost the Musical by David A. Stewart, Glen Ballard choreo. by Lea Rand |
| | Short dance | |
| 2017–2018 | Cha-cha: I Like It Like That; Rhumba: Addicted to You performed by Avicii; Samba: Ooh la la by Chicadee choreo. by Lea Rand | Goliyon Ki Raasleela Ram-Leela; Nagada Sang Dhol; Dhoop; Tattad Tattad choreo. by Lea Rand |
| 2016–2017 | Swing: Bei Mir Bistu Shein by Sholom Secunda; Blues; Swing: Bei Mir Bistu Shein by Sholom Secunda choreo. by Elena Kustarova, Irina Shtork, Taavi Rand | María; Perdóname; La Copa de la Vida by Ricky Martin choreo. by Elena Kustarova, Irina Štork, Taavi Rand |
| 2015–2016 | Waltz: Waltz in G flat by Young Mozart; March: We Will Rock You by Queen choreo. by Lea Rand | Still Loving You; Rock You Like a Hurricane by the Scorpions choreo. by Lea Rand |
| 2014–2015 | Samba: Chillando Goma by Fulanito; Rhumba: Les feuilles mortes by Andrea Bocelli; Samba: Samba de Janeiro by Bellini choreo. by Lea Rand | Played-A-Live (The Bongo Song) by Safri Duo; Run the Show by Kat DeLuna, Busta Rhymes choreo. by Lea Rand |

== Competitive highlights ==
GP: Grand Prix; CS: Challenger Series; JGP: Junior Grand Prix

=== With Yukhimuk for Belarus ===
International
| Event | 19–20 | 20–21 | 21–22 |
|---|---|---|---|
| Worlds | | 28th | |
| Europeans | | | 22nd |
| GP Rostelecom Cup | | 10th | |
| CS Denis Ten Memorial | | | 4th |
| CS Golden Spin | | | WD |
| CS Nebelhorn Trophy | | | WD |
| CS Warsaw Cup | | C | 12th |
| Ice Star | | 1st | 1st |
| LuMi Dance Trophy | | 2nd | |
| Santa Claus Cup | | WD | |
| Spring Star | | 1st | |
| Winter Star | | 3rd | |
National
| Belarusian Champ. | WD | | 1st |

=== With Gruzdev for Estonia ===
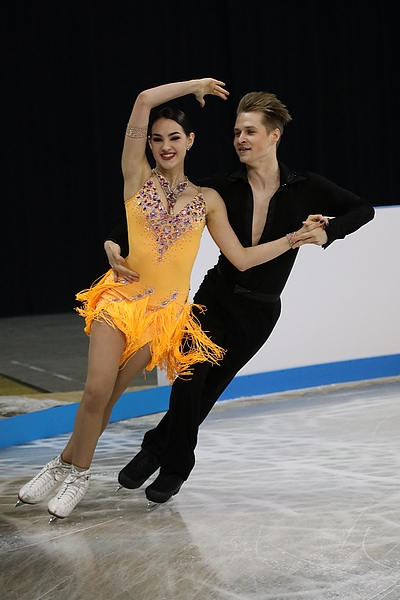
Semenjuk/Gruzdev at the 2018 World Junior Championships

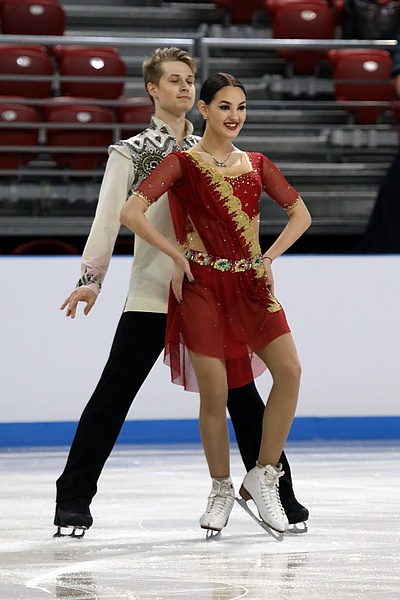
Semenjuk/Gruzdev at the 2018 World Junior Championships

International
| Event | 14–15 | 15–16 | 16–17 | 17–18 | 18–19 |
|---|---|---|---|---|---|
| CS Lombardia | | | | 13th | |
| CS Nebelhorn | | | | 16th | |
International: Junior
| Junior Worlds | | 25th | 21st | 20th | 16th |
| Youth Olympics | | 10th | | | |
| JGP Armenia | | | | | 10th |
| JGP Croatia | | 14th | | | |
| JGP Czech Rep. | | | | | 13th |
| JGP Estonia | 13th | | 9th | | |
| JGP Germany | 14th | | | | |
| JGP Poland | | 13th | | | |
| JGP Russia | | | 8th | | |
| Ice Star | 20th | | | | |
| Tallinn Trophy | 6th | 8th | 5th | 7th | 4th |
| Volvo Open Cup | 17th | | | | 8th |
National
| Estonian Champ. | | | | 1st | |
| Estonian Youth | 2nd | 1st | | 1st | 1st |

== Detailed results ==
ISU Personal Bests highlighted in bold.

=== With Yukhimuk ===
**2021–22 season**
| Date | Event | RD | FD | Total |
| September 22–25, 2021 | 2021 CS Nebelhorn Trophy | | | |
2020–21 season
| Date | Event | RD | FD | Total |
| 9–11 April 2021 | 2021 Spring Star | 1; 66.35 | 1; 99.02 | 1; 165.37 |
| 22–28 March 2021 | 2021 World Championships | 28; 51.15 | - | 28; 51.15 |
| 10–13 February 2021 | 2021 LuMi Dance Trophy | 2; 66.10 | 2; 94.15 | 2; 160.25 |
| 11–13 December 2020 | 2021 Belarusian Championships | 1; 68.68 | 1; 98.88 | 1; 167.56 |
| 11–13 December 2020 | 2020 Winter Star | 3; 68.68 | 3; 98.88 | 3; 167.56 |
| 20–22 November 2020 | 2020 Rostelecom Cup | 10; 56.22 | 10; 90.16 | 10; 146.38 |
| 29 Oct. – 1 Nov. 2020 | 2020 Ice Star | 1; 60.48 | 1; 91.37 | 1; 151.85 |
2019–20 season
| Date | Event | RD | FD | Total |
| 14–15 December 2019 | 2020 Belarusian Championships | 1; 64.44 | WD | WD |
