= Julia Sheremet =

Belarusian figure skater

Personal information
- Born: 8 June 1988 (age 38) Tolyatti, Russian SFSR, Soviet Union
- Height: 1.67 m (5 ft 5 1/2 in)

Figure skating career
- Country: Belarus
- Skating club: Vitebsk FSC
- Began skating: 1997
- Retired: 2009

Julia Sheremet (born 8 July 1988) is a Belarusian figure skater. She is the 2006 Belarusian national champion and qualified for the free skate at the 2007 World Junior Championships.

== Programs ==
Season	Short program	Free skating
2008–2009	Classical medley	Oriental medley
2006–2008	Tango de los Exilados performed by Vanessa-Mae	Spartacus by Aram Khachaturian
2006–2007	Tango performed by Vanessa-Mae	Spartacus by Aram Khachaturian
2005–2006	Amélie by Yann Tiersen	Music performed by Maksim Mrvica

== Competitive highlights ==
International
Event	03–04	04–05	05–06	06–07	07–08	08–09
World Champ.					36th	
European Champ.				29th	27th	37th
International: Junior
World Junior Champ.			18th P	21st		
JGP Bulgaria					11th	
JGP Czech Rep.				25th		
JGP Estonia			23rd			
Golden Lynx					2nd J	
Warsaw Cup	8th J					
National
Belarusian Champ.	2nd	2nd	1st	2nd	1st	2nd
J = Junior level; JGP = Junior Grand Prix; P = Qualifying round
