= Sergei Davydov (figure skater) =

Russian figure skater and coach

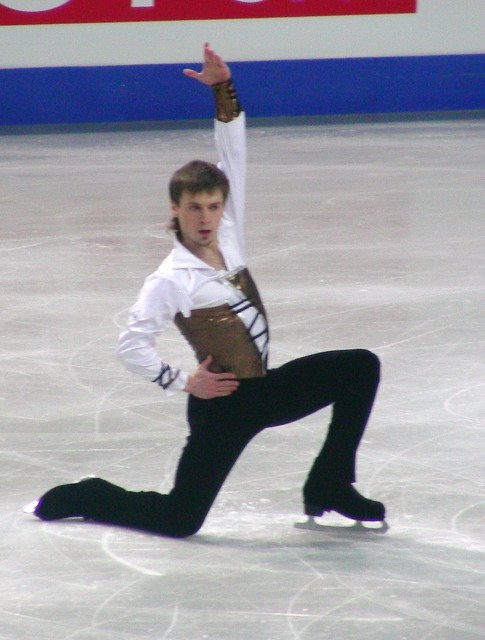
- Davydov at the 2007 European Championships

Personal information
- Full name: Sergei Dmitriyevich Davydov
- Born: 2 March 1979 (age 47) Rostov-on-Don, Russian SFSR, Soviet Union
- Height: 1.59 m (5 ft 3 in)

Figure skating career
- Country: Belarus (1999–2008); Russia (until 1998)
- Skating club: Konek Tchaikovskoi FSC
- Began skating: 1986
- Retired: 2008
Medal record
Representing Russia
Figure skating: Men's singles
World Junior Championships
Silver medal – second place	1998 Saint John	Men's singles

Sergei Dmitriyevich Davydov (Russian: Серге́й Дмитриевич Давыдов, born 2 March 1979 in Rostov-on-Don) is a former competitive figure skater who represented Belarus and Russia. For Belarus, he is the 2006 Cup of China silver medalist, two-time Nebelhorn Trophy champion, and eight-time (2001–2008) Belarusian national champion. He competed at two Olympics and placed as high as 7th at the World Championships (2003) and 4th at the European Championships (2007). For Russia, he is the 1998 World Junior silver medalist. After retirement from the competitive figure skating Davydov became a coach.

== Life and career ==
Early in his career, Davydov competed for Russia. He won the silver medal at the 1998 World Junior Championships.

Davydov moved from Samara, Russia to Vitebsk, Belarus in 1999 and began competing for Belarus. He was coached by Nina Ruchkina in Vitebsk. After the 2000–01 season, he moved to Moscow, Russia to train with Elena Tchaikovskaia and Vladimir Kotin. He competed at the Olympics twice, placing 21st at the 2002 Winter Olympics and 15th at the 2006 Winter Olympics.

Davydov retired from competitive skating following the 2007–08 season.

== Coaching career ==
Following his retirement, Davydov began working as a coach at the CSKA Moscow. His current and former students include:

- Valeria Mikhailova
- Anna Tarusina
- Anna Frolova
- Sofia Samodelkina

== Programs ==
Season	Short program	Free skating
2007–08	Schindler's List by John Williams	Jesus Christ Superstar by Andrew Lloyd Webber
2006–07	Hymn to the Moon by Eugenia Manolidou	Don Quixote by Ludwig Minkus
2005–06	Hymn to the Moon by Eugenia Manolidou	Pirates of the Caribbean by Klaus Badelt; Pearl Harbor by Hans Zimmer
2004–05	Bolero by Maurice Ravel (modern arrangement)	Nostalgia; One Man's Dream by Yanni; Salutation by Eugen Doga
2003–04	Hungarian Dance by Johannes Brahms	Nostalgia; One Man's Dream by Yanni; Salutation by Eugen Doga
2002–03	Judith by Nick Perrito	Gangsters of Saint-Petersburg Russian: Бандитский Петербург by Igor Kornelyuk
2001–02	Judith by Nick Perrito	The Mask of Zorro by James Horner
2000–01	Australian tango	The Mask of Zorro by James Horner

== Competitive highlights ==
GP: Grand Prix; JGP: Junior Series (Junior Grand Prix)

=== Results for Belarus ===
International
Event	00–01	01–02	02–03	03–04	04–05	05–06	06–07	07–08
Olympics		21st				15th		
Worlds	29th	24th	7th	18th	22nd	12th	10th	12th
Europeans	5th	9th	13th	12th	12th	13th	4th	9th
GP Cup of China							2nd	4th
GP Cup of Russia				11th	8th			
GP NHK Trophy								6th
GP Skate America				11th		8th	5th	
Nebelhorn Trophy		1st	1st		9th	5th		
Golden Spin						11th		
National
Belarusian Champ.	1st	1st	1st	1st	1st	1st	1st	1st

=== Results for Russia ===
International
Event	95–96	96–97	97–98	98–99
Nebelhorn Trophy				16th
Skate Israel		3rd		4th
International: Junior
Junior Worlds	5th		2nd	
JGP Germany			7th	
JGP Hungary			4th	
Blue Swords		11th J		
Ukrainian Souvenir	1st J			
National
Russian Champ.	14th			9th
