= Yakau Zenko =

Belarusian figure skater

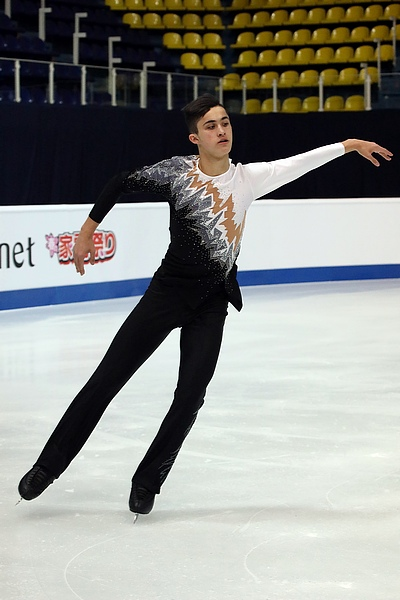
- Zenko at the 2019 World Junior Championships

Personal information
- Native name: Якаў Аляксандравіч Зянько (Belarusian)
- Full name: Yakau Alyaksandravich Zyanko
- Born: 21 July 2000 (age 26) Minsk, Belarus
- Height: 1.82 m (5 ft 11 1/2 in)

Figure skating career
- Country: Belarus
- Coach: Igor Rolinski
- Skating club: Club Minsk
- Began skating: 2004
- Retired: June 22, 2020

Yakau Zenko (Belarusian: Якаў Аляксандравіч Зянько; born 21 July 2000) is a Belarusian retired figure skater. He competed in the final segment at the 2016 World Junior Championships.

== Career ==
Zenko began learning to skate in 2004. Early in his career, he trained under Julia Soldatova at Moskvich in Moscow.

By the 2015–2016 season, he had joined Eteri Tutberidze and Sergei Dudakov at Sambo 70 (Moscow). Making his ISU Junior Grand Prix (JGP) debut, he placed 16th in Austria and 8th in Poland, both held in September 2015. A few months later, he became the Belarusian national senior bronze medalist and junior champion. In March 2016, he qualified to the final segment at the World Junior Championships in Debrecen, Hungary; he ranked 22nd in the short program, 15th in the free skate, and 17th overall.

Zenko was eliminated after the short program at the 2017 World Junior Championships in Taipei, Taiwan. He was coached by Tutberidze and Dudakov.

In the 2017–2018 season, Zenko is coached by Igor Rolinski in Moscow and Minsk.

== Programs ==
Season	Short program	Free skating
2017–2018	Dream by Imagine Dragons	Still Loving You by the Scorpions; Whole Lotta Love by Led Zeppelin
2016–2017	Gopher Mambo by Ima Sumac; Mambo No. 5 by Lou Bega	Still Loving You by the Scorpions; Whole Lotta Love by Led Zeppelin
2015–2016	Gopher Mambo by Ima Sumac; Mambo No. 5 by Lou Bega	Titine by Charlie Chaplin; Modern Times - Later That Night by René Aubry

== Competitive highlights ==
CS: Challenger Series; JGP: Junior Grand Prix

International
Event	14–15	15–16	16–17	17–18	18–19	19–20
Europeans				35th	30th	
CS Finlandia						15th
CS Ice Star				14th		10th
CS Nebelhorn				23rd		
CS Tallinn Trophy			WD			
CS Warsaw Cup						14th
Tallink Hotels Cup					4th	
International: Junior
Junior Worlds		17th	33rd	29th	30th	
JGP Austria		16th				
JGP France			WD			13th
JGP Poland		8th				
EYOF			5th			
Ice Star		2nd	4th			
Volvo Open						3rd
National
Belarus		3rd		1st	1st	4th
Belarus: Junior	2nd	1st				
J = Junior level TBD = Assigned; WD = Withdrew
