= Konstantin Milyukov =

Belarusian figure skater

- Milyukov in 2019

Personal information
- Native name: Константин Романович Милюков (Russian)
- Full name: Konstantin Romanovich Milyukov
- Other names: Miliukov
- Born: 27 March 1994 (age 32) Kazan, Russia
- Home town: Minsk, Belarus

Figure skating career
- Country: Belarus
- Coach: Oleg Vasiliev
- Retired: October 14, 2022

Konstantin Romanovich Milyukov (Russian: Константин Романович Милюков; born 27 March 1994) is a retired Russian-born figure skater who competed for Belarus. He is the 2020 Ice Star silver medalist, the 2020 Winter Star silver medalist, and the 2021 Belarusian national champion. He competed in the final segment at the 2021 World Championships held in Stockholm, Sweden.

Milyukov has represented Belarus since 2019. Earlier in his career representing Russia, he was the 2017 Santa Claus Cup champion.

== Programs ==
Season	Short program	Free skating
2021–2022	The Nutcracker by Pyotr Ilyich Tchaikovsky choreo. by Diana Malygina	A Journey by Eric Radford; Experience by Ludovico Einaudi
2020–2021	The Nutcracker by Pyotr Ilyich Tchaikovsky choreo. by Diana Malygina	The Piano; Time Lapse by Michael Nyman choreo. by Vazgen Azrojan

== Competitive highlights ==
CS: Challenger Series

=== For Belarus ===
International
Event	19–20	20–21	21–22
Olympics			20th
Worlds		17th	
Europeans			21st
CS Finlandia Trophy			20th
CS Golden Spin	13th		
CS Lombardia Trophy			10th
CS Warsaw Cup			13th
Bosphorus Cup	4th		
Ice Star		2nd	2nd
Tallink Hotels Cup	9th		
Winter Star		2nd	
National
Belarusian Champ.	3rd	1st	1st
TBD = Assigned; WD = Withdrew

=== For Russia ===
International
Event	09–10	10–11	11–12	12–13	13–14	14–15-16–17	17–18	18–19
CS Alpen Trophy								4th
Santa Claus Cup							1st	
National
Russian Champ.	18th	15th			17th		13th	6th
Russian Junior	9th		5th	17th				
