= Vitali Luchanok =

Belarusian figure skater

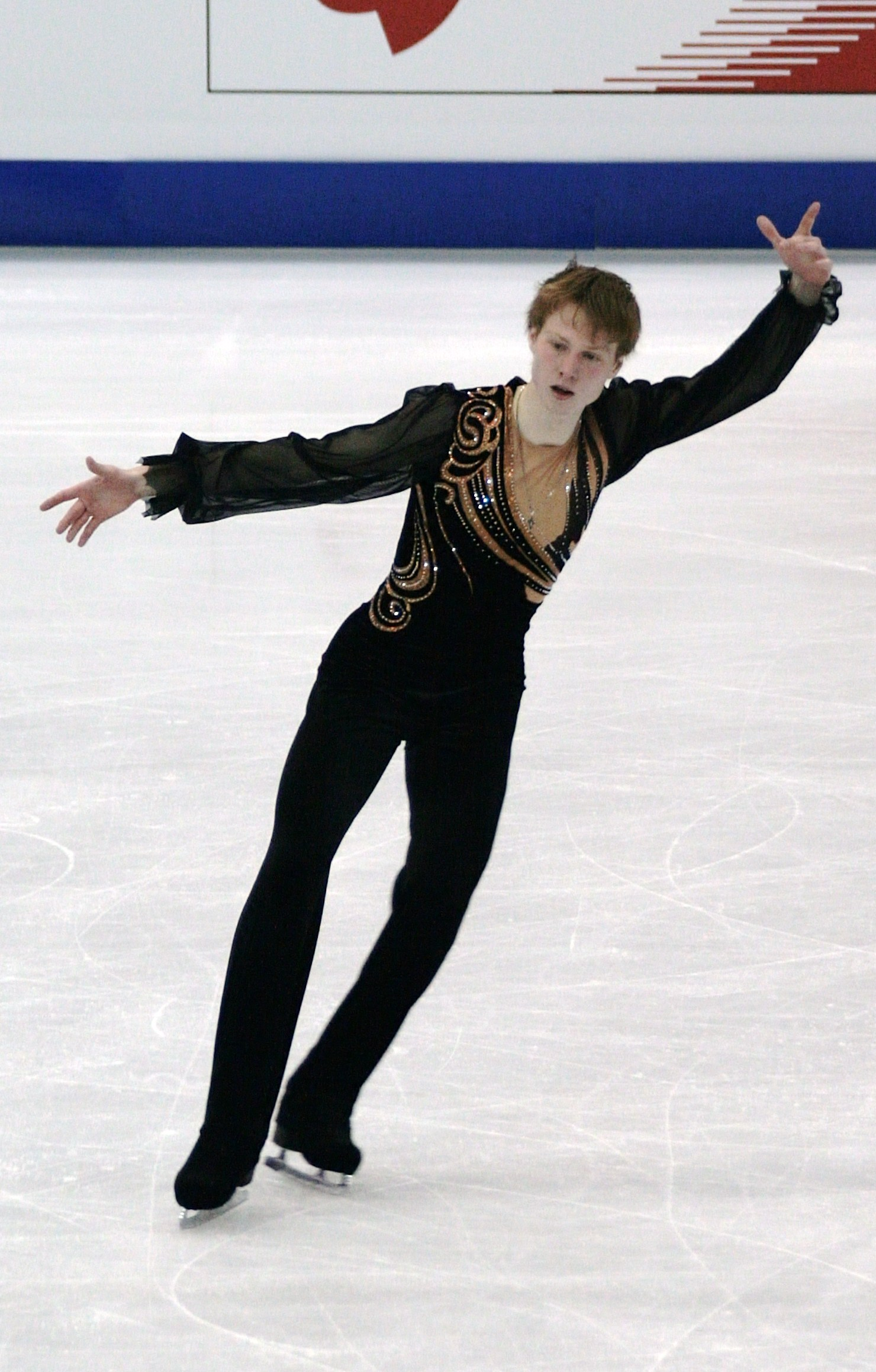
- Luchanok at the 2012 Worlds

Personal information
- Born: 29 February 1992 (age 34) Smalyavichy, Belarus
- Home town: Minsk, Belarus
- Height: 1.87 m (6 ft 1 1/2 in)

Figure skating career
- Country: Belarus
- Coach: Viktor Kudriavtsev
- Began skating: 1997

Vitali Luchanok (born 29 February 1992) is a Belarusian figure skater who competed in men's singles. He placed 23rd at the 2011 World Junior Championships.

== Programs ==
Season	Short program	Free skating
2011–12	Not Afraid by Sunny Choi	Granada
2010–11	Tristan and Isolde by Richard Wagner	Granada

== Competitive highlights ==
International
Event	10–11	11–12	12–13	13–14
World Champ.	22nd P	41st		
European Champ.		27th		
Cup of Nice		16th	12th	
Finlandia Trophy		17th		
Ice Star			3rd	
Nebelhorn Trophy			21st	
Nepela Memorial			14th	15th
Volvo Open Cup			9th	
Warsaw Cup			8th	
International: Junior
World Junior Champ.	23rd			
JGP Romania	11th			
Tirnavia Ice Cup	1st J			
Warsaw Cup	1st J			
National
Belarusian Champ.	3rd	2nd	4th	
