= Thomas Stoll =

German figure skater

Personal information
- Born: 11 May 1998 (age 28) Berlin, Germany
- Height: 1.69 m (5 ft 6 1/2 in)

Figure skating career
- Country: Germany
- Coach: Viola Striegler
- Skating club: SC Berlin
- Began skating: 2001

Thomas Stoll (born 11 May 1998) is a German figure skater. He represented Germany at the 2017 World Junior Championships in Taipei; he qualified to the final segment and finished 24th overall in Taiwan. He is the 2017 national junior champion and a two-time national senior medalist.

== Programs ==
Season	Short program	Free skating
2021–2022	Despacito written by Luis Fonsi; Bailar by Deorro & Elvis Crespo	Back to Black by Oscar and the Wolf
2019–2021	Istanbul (Not Constantinople) written by Jimmy Kennedy & Nat Simon performed by They Might Be Giants	A Whiter Shade of Pale by Procol Harum
2018–2019	Last Flight by Raphaël Beau	A Whiter Shade of Pale by Procol Harum
2016–2017	The Old Men of the Mountain by Big Bad Voodoo Daddy	Paint It Black; Angie; Start Me Up by The Rolling Stones

== Competitive highlights ==
International
Event	13–14	14–15	15–16	16–17	17–18	18–19	19–20	20–21	21–22
CS Alpen Trophy						8th			
CS Cup of Austria									25th
CS Golden Spin							WD		
CS Nebelhorn						8th	11th	17th	28th
CS Tallinn Trophy						17th			
CS Warsaw Cup								WD	WD
Bavarian Open					5th	6th			
Challenge Cup					6th	WD			
Coupe Printemps					WD				
Open d'Andorra							2nd		
International: Junior
Junior Worlds				24th					
JGP Germany									
JGP Poland									
JGP Slovenia									
Bavarian Open	15th			7th					
Challenge Cup		7th							
Cup of Nice			8th						
Cup of Tyrol				4th					
Hellmut Seibt			2nd						
NRW Trophy	16th	10th		5th					
Tallinn Trophy				2nd					
Volvo Open Cup			6th						
National
Germany					4th	2nd	3rd		
Germany: Youth	9th J	4th J	4th J	1st J					
