= Gerli Liinamäe =

Estonian figure skater

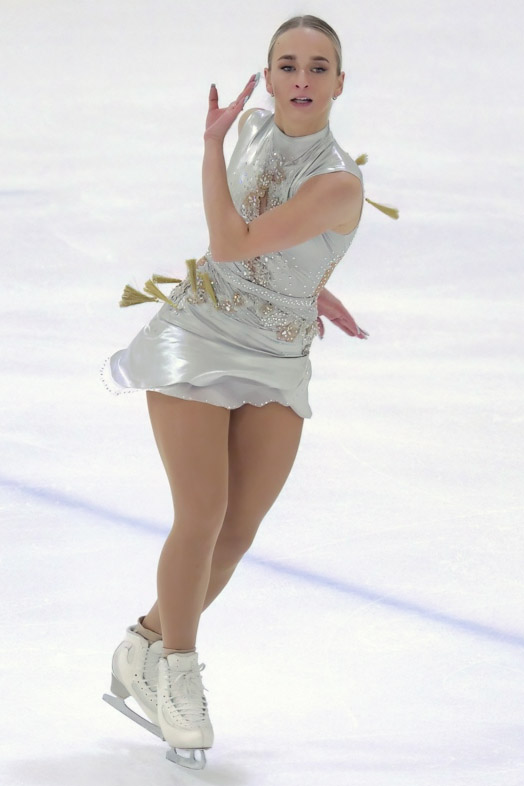
- Gerli Liinamäe at the 2022 Lombardia Trophy

Personal information
- Born: 21 March 1995 (age 31) Tallinn, Estonia
- Height: 1.60 m (5 ft 3 in)

Figure skating career
- Country: Estonia
- Discipline: Women's singles
- Coach: Tiiu Valgemäe
- Skating club: Gliss Skating Club
- Began skating: 2001

Medal record
Estonian Championships
Gold medal – first place	2011 Narva	Singles
Gold medal – first place	2015 Tallinn	Singles
Gold medal – first place	2018 Tallinn	Singles
Gold medal – first place	2019 Tallinn	Singles
Silver medal – second place	2012 Tallinn	Singles
Silver medal – second place	2014 Tallinn	Singles
Silver medal – second place	2017 Tallinn	Singles
Silver medal – second place	2021 Tallinn	Singles
Bronze medal – third place	2023 Tallinn	Singles

Gerli Liinamäe (born 21 March 1995) is an Estonian figure skater. She is the 2017 Volvo Open Cup champion, the 2019 Nordic silver medalist, and a four-time (2011, 2015, 2018, 2019) Estonian national champion. She has competed in the final segment at five ISU Championships. Her best placements were 13th at the 2011 European Championships and 14th at the 2012 World Junior Championships.

== Programs ==
Season	Short program	Free skating
2022–2023	I Surrender by Celine Dion	Oriental by Raul Ferrando, Fathi Aljarah, Adam Hurst; Whenever, Wherever by Shakira
2021–2022	I Surrender by Celine Dion	Frozen by Madonna
2020–2021	The Show Must Go On by Queen	Frozen by Madonna
2018–2019	Young and Beautiful by Lana Del Rey	Bloodstream by Tokio Myers
2015–2016	Chopin by Edvin Marton	Standing The Storm by William Joseph
2014–2015	Chopin by Edvin Marton	Medley by ABBA
2013–2014	La Serenissima by Eine kleine Nachtmusik	Medley by ABBA
2012–2013	Palladio performed by Escala	Danse macabre by Camille Saint-Saëns
2011–2012	Seagull	Otoñal by Raúl Di Blasio
2010–2011	Harem by Sarah Brightman; One Fine Day by Giacomo Puccini	Otoñal by Raúl Di Blasio

== Competitive highlights ==
CS: Challenger Series; JGP: Junior Grand Prix

International
Event	09–10	10–11	11–12	12–13	13–14	14–15	15–16	16–17	17–18	18–19	19–20	20–21	21–22	22–23	23–24
Worlds									34th						
Europeans		13th				22nd				27th					
CS Alpen Trophy										11th					
CS Budapest Trophy															WD
CS Golden Spin													10th		
CS Ice Challenge							18th						20th		
CS Ice Star											11th				
CS Lombardia								20th	24th					13th	
CS Nebelhorn										WD	WD	WD	23rd		14th
CS Tallinn Trophy								14th	16th	12th					
CS Volvo Cup						9th									
CS Warsaw Cup								22nd			15th	WD		11th	24th
Challenge Cup								7th	12th		14th				
Crystal Skate			2nd												
Cup of Tyrol							5th								
Gardena Trophy							8th								
Finlandia Trophy					13th										
Ice Challenge		5th		5th											
Kaunas Ice Cup									2nd						
Lombardia					7th										
Nordics					6th		12th		8th	2nd	7th			10th	
Open Ice Mall										4th					
Swiss Open															9th
Tallinn Trophy						9th									
Tallink Hotels Cup											4th	8th			
Universiade										9th					
Volvo Open Cup									1st					WD	
International: Junior
Junior Worlds		15th	14th	27th	20th										
JGP Estonia			4th												
JGP France		10th													
JGP Germany		9th		9th											
JGP Latvia			4th												
JGP Turkey				6th											
Ice Challenge	1st														
National
Estonia		1st	2nd		2nd	1st	WD	2nd	1st	1st	WD	2nd		3rd	6th
Estonia: Junior	4th	1st	1st	1st	1st										
J = Junior level; WD = Withdrew
