= Aliaksandra Chepeleva =

Belarusian figure skater (born 2003)

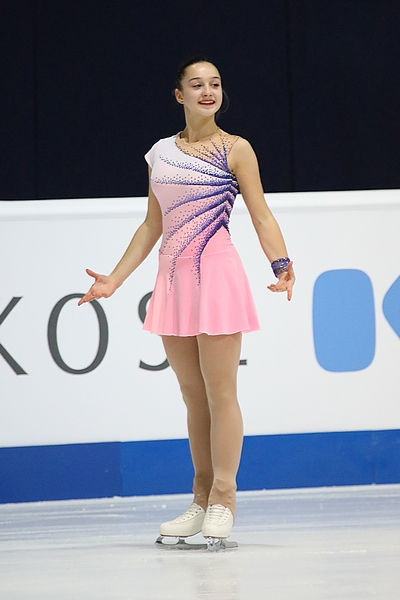
- Chepeleva at the 2019 World Junior Championships

Personal information
- Native name: Аляксандра Чэпелева
- Other names: Aleksandra
- Born: 28 February 2003 (age 23) Minsk, Belarus
- Home town: Minsk
- Height: 1.60 m (5 ft 3 in)

Figure skating career
- Country: Belarus
- Coach: Tatiana Shastak
- Began skating: 2007

Medal record
Belarusian Championships
Gold medal – first place	2018 Minsk	Singles
Gold medal – first place	2019 Minsk	Singles

Aliaksandra Chepeleva (Belarusian: Аляксандра Чэпелева; born 28 February 2003) is a Belarusian figure skater. She is a two-time Belarusian national champion (2018, 2019).

== Personal life ==
Chepeleva was born on 28 February 2003 in Minsk, Belarus. She graduated from the Belarusian State University in 2024.

== Competitive highlights ==
International
Event	16–17	17–18	18–19	19–20	20–21	21–22
CS Ice Star				23rd		
CS Tallinn Trophy			18th			
Ice Star			11th		10th	6th
Spring Star					2nd	
Volvo Open Cup			18th	24th		
Winter Star					5th	3rd
International: Junior
Junior Worlds		42nd	35th			
JGP Armenia			14th			
JGP Belarus		23rd				
JGP Luthuania			16th			
JGP Poland		13th				
EYOF			12th			
Ice Star	9th	11th				
Kaunas Ice Cup		10th				
Open Ice Mall			2nd			
Tallinn Trophy	10th					
Toruń Cup	12th					
Volvo Open Cup	8th					
National
Belarusian Champ.	4th	1st	1st	4th		
