= 2019 CS Nepela Memorial =

Figure skating competition

- Type: ISU Challenger Series
- Date: September 19 – 21
- Season: 2019–20
- Location: Bratislava, Slovakia
- Host: Slovak Figure Skating Association
- Venue: Ondrej Nepela Arena

Champions
- Men's singles: (Russia) Dmitri Aliev
- Ladies' singles: (Russia) Alexandra Trusova
- Ice dance: (Russia) Victoria Sinitsina / Nikita Katsalapov
- Previous: 2018 CS Ondrej Nepela Trophy
- Next: 2022 CS Nepela Memorial

The 2019 CS Nepela Memorial, formerly known as the Ondrej Nepela Trophy, was held in September 2019 at the Ondrej Nepela Arena. It was part of the 2019–20 ISU Challenger Series. Medals were awarded in the disciplines of men's singles, ladies' singles, and ice dance.

== Entries ==
The International Skating Union published the list of entries on August 27, 2019.

Country	Men	Ladies	Ice dance
Austria		Stefanie Pesendorfer; Sophia Schaller	
Azerbaijan		Ekaterina Ryabova	
Bulgaria	Nicky Obreykov		Mina Zdravkova / Christopher M. Davis
Czech Republic	Jiří Bělohradský	Nikola Rychtaříková	
Finland			Yuka Orihara / Juho Pirinen
France	Xavier Vauclin		Natacha Lagouge / Arnaud Caffa; Evgeniia Lopareva / Geoffrey Brissaud
Germany			Katharina Müller / Tim Dieck
Hong Kong	Kwun Hung Leung		
Hungary	Alexander Maszljanko	Ivett Tóth	
Italy	Matteo Rizzo	Lara Naki Gutmann; Roberta Rodeghiero	
Japan	Mitsuki Sumoto	Kaori Sakamoto; Mako Yamashita	
Kazakhstan	Nikita Manko	Aiza Mambekova	
Latvia	Deniss Vasiļjevs	Angelīna Kučvaļska	Aurelija Ipolito / J.T. Michel
Lithuania		Aleksandra Golovkina	
Norway	Sondre Oddvoll Bøe		
Poland			Jenna Hertenstein / Damian Binkowski
Russia	Dmitri Aliev; Alexander Samarin	Stanislava Konstantinova; Maria Sotskova; Alexandra Trusova	Sofia Evdokimova / Egor Bazin; Betina Popova / Sergey Mozgov; Victoria Sinitsina / Nikita Katsalapov
Slovakia	Marco Klepoch; Michael Neuman	Ema Doboszova	
Spain			Sara Hurtado / Kirill Khaliavin
South Korea	Lee June-hyoung	Kim Ha-nul	Yura Min / Daniel Eaton
United Kingdom	Graham Newberry	Danielle Harrison; Karly Robertson	
United States			Lorraine McNamara / Quinn Carpenter

=== Changes to preliminary assignments ===
Date	Discipline	Withdrew	Added	Reason/Other notes	Refs
September 3	Men	(Azerbaijan) Vladimir Litvintsev			
September 10	Men	(Estonia) Daniel Albert Naurits			
September 10	Ladies	(Czech Republic) Elizaveta Ukolova			
September 10	Ladies	(Slovakia) Nicole Rajičová			
September 10	Ice dance	(Russia) Tiffany Zahorski / Jonathan Guerreiro	(Russia) Betina Popova / Sergey Mozgov		
September 13	Ladies	(Slovakia) Nina Letenayová			
September 17	Men	(Australia) Brendan Kerry			
September 17	Men	(Russia) Mikhail Kolyada		Illness	
September 17	Ladies	(South Korea) Jeon Su-been	(Latvia) Angelīna Kučvaļska		

== Records ==
The following new ISU best scores were set during this competition:

Event	Component	Skater(s)	Score	Date	Ref
Ladies	Free skating	(Russia) Alexandra Trusova	163.78	September 21, 2019	
Ladies	Total score	(Russia) Alexandra Trusova	238.69	September 21, 2019	

== Results ==
=== Men ===
Rank	Name	Nation	Total points	SP		FS	
1	Dmitri Aliev	Russia	255.32	1	101.49	2	153.83
2	Matteo Rizzo	Italy	232.70	4	75.87	1	156.83
3	Deniss Vasiļjevs	Latvia	229.97	2	79.76	3	150.21
4	Alexander Samarin	Russia	218.45	3	79.56	5	138.89
5	Mitsuki Sumoto	Japan	209.15	5	68.14	4	141.01
6	Graham Newberry	United Kingdom	198.04	6	63.22	6	134.82
7	Jiří Bělohradský	Czech Republic	177.69	7	55.78	7	121.91
8	Lee June-hyoung	South Korea	172.24	9	52.49	8	119.75
9	Sondre Oddvoll Bøe	Norway	156.53	10	51.87	10	104.66
10	Nicky Obreykov	Bulgaria	155.19	12	49.25	9	105.94
11	Nikita Manko	Kazakhstan	148.29	8	53.65	12	94.64
12	Xavier Vauclin	France	143.62	14	46.75	11	96.87
13	Alexander Maszljanko	Hungary	134.53	11	51.73	13	82.80
14	Michael Neuman	Slovakia	128.37	13	47.17	14	81.20
15	Kwun Hung Leung	Hong Kong	123.04	15	42.45	15	80.59
16	Marco Klepoch	Slovakia	107.05	16	41.64	16	65.41

=== Ladies ===
Rank	Name	Nation	Total points	SP		FS	
1	Alexandra Trusova	Russia	238.69	1	74.91	1	163.78
2	Kaori Sakamoto	Japan	194.42	4	59.97	2	134.45
3	Kim Ha-nul	South Korea	182.50	2	62.59	4	119.91
4	Lara Naki Gutmann	Italy	178.12	3	62.41	5	115.71
5	Ekaterina Ryabova	Azerbaijan	178.06	6	56.40	3	121.66
6	Mako Yamashita	Japan	163.54	7	55.99	6	107.55
7	Stanislava Konstantinova	Russia	162.25	5	58.19	9	104.06
8	Ivett Tóth	Hungary	155.79	8	50.23	8	105.56
9	Maria Sotskova	Russia	155.25	10	48.93	7	106.32
10	Roberta Rodeghiero	Italy	150.69	11	48.12	10	102.57
11	Stefanie Pesendorfer	Austria	136.01	12	47.32	11	88.69
12	Karly Robertson	United Kingdom	134.60	9	50.03	13	84.57
13	Aleksandra Golovkina	Lithuania	131.37	15	44.42	12	86.95
14	Aiza Mambekova	Kazakhstan	125.71	13	47.08	16	78.63
15	Sophia Schaller	Austria	124.65	17	43.11	14	81.54
16	Danielle Harrison	United Kingdom	123.04	16	44.05	15	78.99
17	Ema Doboszova	Slovakia	115.43	19	39.09	17	76.34
18	Nikola Rychtaříková	Czech Republic	114.17	18	39.11	18	75.06
19	Angelīna Kučvaļska	Latvia	109.77	14	45.76	19	64.01

=== Ice dance ===
Rank	Name	Nation	Total points	RD		FD	
1	Victoria Sinitsina / Nikita Katsalapov	Russia	198.14	1	78.44	1	119.70
2	Sara Hurtado / Kirill Khaliavin	Spain	188.97	2	77.03	2	111.94
3	Lorraine McNamara / Quinn Carpenter	United States	183.47	3	73.60	3	109.87
4	Betina Popova / Sergey Mozgov	Russia	174.12	4	73.30	5	100.82
5	Yuka Orihara / Juho Pirinen	Finland	166.93	5	67.01	6	99.92
6	Evgeniia Lopareva / Geoffrey Brissaud	France	165.68	8	63.98	4	101.70
7	Sofia Evdokimova / Egor Bazin	Russia	164.62	6	66.31	7	98.31
8	Katharina Müller / Tim Dieck	Germany	159.20	7	65.42	8	93.78
9	Yura Min / Daniel Eaton	South Korea	156.45	9	62.88	9	93.57
10	Natacha Lagouge / Arnaud Caffa	France	138.29	10	53.76	10	84.53
11	Aurelija Ipolito / J.T. Michel	Latvia	106.97	12	41.83	12	65.14
12	Jenna Hertenstein / Damian Binkowski	Poland	104.41	13	37.30	11	67.11
WD	Mina Zdravkova / Christopher M. Davis	Bulgaria	withdrew	11	45.90	withdrew from competition	
