= 2020 European Figure Skating Championships =

Figure skating competition

- Type: ISU Championship
- Date: 20 – 26 January
- Season: 2019–20
- Location: Graz, Austria
- Host: Skating Union of Austria
- Venue: Steiermarkhalle

Champions
- Men's singles: (Russia) Dmitri Aliev
- Ladies' singles: (Russia) Alena Kostornaia
- Pairs: (Russia) Aleksandra Boikova / Dmitrii Kozlovskii
- Ice dance: (Russia) Victoria Sinitsina / Nikita Katsalapov
- Previous: 2019 European Championships
- Next: 2022 European Championships

The 2020 European Figure Skating Championships were held in Graz, Austria, on 20–26 January 2020. Medals were awarded in the disciplines of men's singles, ladies' singles, pairs, and ice dance. The competition determined the entry quotas for each federation at the 2021 European Championships.

== Qualification ==
=== Age and minimum TES requirements ===
The competition is open to skaters from all European member nations of the International Skating Union. The corresponding competition for non-European skaters is the 2020 Four Continents Figure Skating Championships.

Skaters are eligible for the 2020 European Championships if they turned 15 years of age before 1 July 2019 and have met the minimum technical elements score requirements. The ISU accepts scores if they were obtained at senior-level ISU-recognized international competitions at least 21 days before the first official practice day of the championships.

Minimum technical scores (TES)
Discipline	SP / RD	FS / FD
Men	28	46
Ladies	23	40
Pairs	25	42
Ice dance	28	44
Must be achieved at an ISU-recognized international event in the ongoing or preceding season. SP and FS scores may be attained at different events.

=== Number of entries per discipline ===
Based on the results of the 2019 European Championships, each country can field one to three entries per discipline.

Spots	Men	Ladies	Pairs	Dance
3	Russia; Italy	Russia; France; Finland	Russia; France; Italy	Russia; France
2	Czech Republic; France; Georgia; Israel; Spain; Sweden	Czech Republic; Slovakia; Switzerland	Croatia; Germany; Great Britain; Spain	Great Britain; Italy; Poland; Spain
If not listed above, one entry is allowed.

== Entries ==
Member nations began announcing their selections in December 2019. The International Skating Union published a complete list of entries on 3 January 2020.

Country	Men	Ladies	Pairs	Ice dance
Armenia	Slavik Hayrapetyan	Anastasia Galustyan	—	Tina Garabedian / Simon Proulx-Sénécal
Austria	Maurizio Zandron	Olga Mikutina	Miriam Ziegler / Severin Kiefer	—
Azerbaijan	Vladimir Litvintsev	Ekaterina Ryabova	—	—
Belarus	Alexander Lebedev	Viktoriia Safonova	—	Emiliya Kalehanova / Uladzislau Palkhouski
Bulgaria	Larry Loupolover	Alexandra Feigin	—	Mina Zdrakova / Christopher M. Davis
Croatia	—	Hana Cvijanović	Lana Petranović / António Souza-Cordeiro	—
Czech Republic	Matyáš Bělohradský	Eliška Březinová	—	Natálie Taschlerová / Filip Taschler
Czech Republic	Michal Březina	Klára Štěpánová	—	—
Estonia	Aleksandr Selevko	Eva-Lotta Kiibus	—	—
Finland	Roman Galay	Linnea Ceder	—	Yuka Orihara / Juho Pirinen
Finland	—	Emmi Peltonen	—	—
Finland	—	Jenni Saarinen	—	—
France	Kévin Aymoz	Maïa Mazzara	Cléo Hamon / Denys Strekalin	Adelina Galyavieva / Louis Thauron
France	Adam Siao Him Fa	Maé-Bérénice Méité	Coline Keriven / Noël-Antoine Pierre	Evgenia Lopareva / Geoffrey Brissaud
France		Léa Serna	—	Gabriella Papadakis / Guillaume Cizeron
Georgia	Morisi Kvitelashvili	Alina Urushadze	—	Maria Kazakova / Georgy Reviya
Georgia	Irakli Maysuradze	—	—	—
Germany	Paul Fentz	Nicole Schott	Minerva Fabienne Hase / Nolan Seegert	Katharina Müller / Tim Dieck
Germany	—		Annika Hocke / Robert Kunkel	—
Great Britain	Peter James Hallam	Natasha McKay	Zoe Jones / Christopher Boyadji	Lilah Fear / Lewis Gibson
Great Britain	—			Robynne Tweedale / Joseph Buckland
Hungary	András Csernoch	Ivett Tóth	Ioulia Chtchetinina / Márk Magyar	Emily Monaghan / Illias Fourati
Ireland	Conor Stakelum	—		—
Israel	Alexei Bychenko	Nelli Ioffe	Anna Vernikov / Evgeni Krasnopolski	—
Israel	Mark Gorodnitsky	—		—
Italy	Gabriele Frangipani	Alessia Tornaghi	Nicole Della Monica / Matteo Guarise	Charlène Guignard / Marco Fabbri
Italy	Daniel Grassl	—	Rebecca Ghilardi / Filippo Ambrosini	Jasmine Tessari / Francesco Fioretti
Italy	Matteo Rizzo	—	—	—
Latvia	Deniss Vasiļjevs	Angelīna Kučvaļska	—	Aurelija Ipolito / J.T. Michel
Lithuania	—	Aleksandra Golovkina	—	Allison Reed / Saulius Ambrulevičius
Monaco	Davide Lewton Brain	—	—	—
Netherlands	Thomas Kennes	Niki Wories	Daria Danilova / Michel Tsiba	—
Norway	Sondre Oddvoll Bøe	—	—	—
Poland	—	Ekaterina Kurakova	—	Natalia Kaliszek / Maksym Spodyriev
Poland	—	—	—	Justyna Plutowska / Jérémie Flemin
Russia	Dmitri Aliev	Alena Kostornaia	Aleksandra Boikova / Dmitrii Kozlovskii	Victoria Sinitsina / Nikita Katsalapov
Russia	Artur Danielian	Anna Shcherbakova	Daria Pavliuchenko / Denis Khodykin	Alexandra Stepanova / Ivan Bukin
Russia	Alexander Samarin	Alexandra Trusova	Evgenia Tarasova / Vladimir Morozov	Tiffany Zahorski / Jonathan Guerreiro
Serbia	—	Antonina Dubinina	—	
Slovakia	Michael Neuman	Ema Doboszová	—	
Slovenia	—	Daša Grm	—	
Spain	—	Valentina Matos	Laura Barquero / Tòn Cónsul	Sara Hurtado / Kirill Khaliavin
Spain	—	—	Dorota Broda / Pedro Betegón Martín	Olivia Smart / Adrián Díaz
Sweden	Nikolaj Majorov	Anita Östlund	—	
Sweden	Illya Solomin	—	—	
Switzerland	Lukas Britschgi	Alexia Paganini	Alexandra Herbríková / Nicolas Roulet	Victoria Manni / Carlo Röthlisberger
Switzerland	—	Yasmine Kimiko Yamada	—	—
Turkey	Burak Demirboğa	Sinem Kuyucu	—	Nicole Kelly / Berk Akalın
Ukraine	Andrey Kokura	Anastasia Gozhva	Sofiia Nesterova / Artem Darenskyi	Oleksandra Nazarova / Maxim Nikitin

=== Changes to preliminary assignments ===
Date	Discipline	Withdrew	Added	Reason/Other notes	Refs
6 January 2020	Men	(Israel) Daniel Samohin	(Israel) Mark Gorodnitsky	Injury	
6 January 2020	Ladies	(Israel) Alina Iushchenkova	(Israel) Nelli Ioffe		
10 January 2020	Ladies	(Belgium) Loena Hendrickx	N/A		
19 January 2020	Men	(Ukraine) Ivan Shmuratko	(Ukraine) Andrey Kokura		
20 January 2020	Ladies	(Romania) Julia Sauter	N/A		

== Medal summary ==
=== Medalists ===
Medals awarded to the skaters who achieve the highest overall placements in each discipline:

Discipline	Gold	Silver	Bronze
Men	(Russia) Dmitri Aliev	(Russia) Artur Danielian	(Georgia (country)) Morisi Kvitelashvili
Ladies	(Russia) Alena Kostornaia	(Russia) Anna Shcherbakova	(Russia) Alexandra Trusova
Pairs	(Russia) Aleksandra Boikova / Dmitrii Kozlovskii	(Russia) Evgenia Tarasova / Vladimir Morozov	(Russia) Daria Pavliuchenko / Denis Khodykin
Ice dance	(Russia) Victoria Sinitsina / Nikita Katsalapov	(France) Gabriella Papadakis / Guillaume Cizeron	(Russia) Alexandra Stepanova / Ivan Bukin

Small medals awarded to the skaters who achieve the highest short program or rhythm dance placements in each discipline:

Discipline	Gold	Silver	Bronze
Men	(Czech Republic) Michal Březina	(Russia) Dmitri Aliev	(Russia) Artur Danielian
Ladies	(Russia) Alena Kostornaia	(Russia) Anna Shcherbakova	(Russia) Alexandra Trusova
Pairs	(Russia) Aleksandra Boikova / Dmitrii Kozlovskii	(Russia) Daria Pavliuchenko / Denis Khodykin	(Russia) Evgenia Tarasova / Vladimir Morozov
Ice dance	(France) Gabriella Papadakis / Guillaume Cizeron	(Russia) Victoria Sinitsina / Nikita Katsalapov	(Italy) Charlène Guignard / Marco Fabbri

Medals awarded to the skaters who achieve the highest free skating or free dance placements in each discipline:

Discipline	Gold	Silver	Bronze
Men	(Russia) Dmitri Aliev	(Italy) Daniel Grassl	(Georgia (country)) Morisi Kvitelashvili
Ladies	(Russia) Anna Shcherbakova	(Russia) Alena Kostornaia	(Russia) Alexandra Trusova
Pairs	(Russia) Aleksandra Boikova / Dmitrii Kozlovskii	(Russia) Evgenia Tarasova / Vladimir Morozov	(Russia) Daria Pavliuchenko / Denis Khodykin
Ice dance	(Russia) Victoria Sinitsina / Nikita Katsalapov	(France) Gabriella Papadakis / Guillaume Cizeron	(Russia) Alexandra Stepanova / Ivan Bukin

=== Medals by country ===
Table of medals for overall placement:

Rank	Nation	Gold	Silver	Bronze	Total
1	Russia	4	3	3	10
2	France	0	1	0	1
3	Georgia	0	0	1	1
Totals (3 entries)		4	4	4	12

== Records ==
The following new ISU best scores were set during this competition:

Event	Component	Skater(s)	Score	Date	Ref
Pairs	Short program	(Russia) Aleksandra Boikova / Dmitrii Kozlovskii	82.34	22 January 2020	

== Results ==
=== Men ===
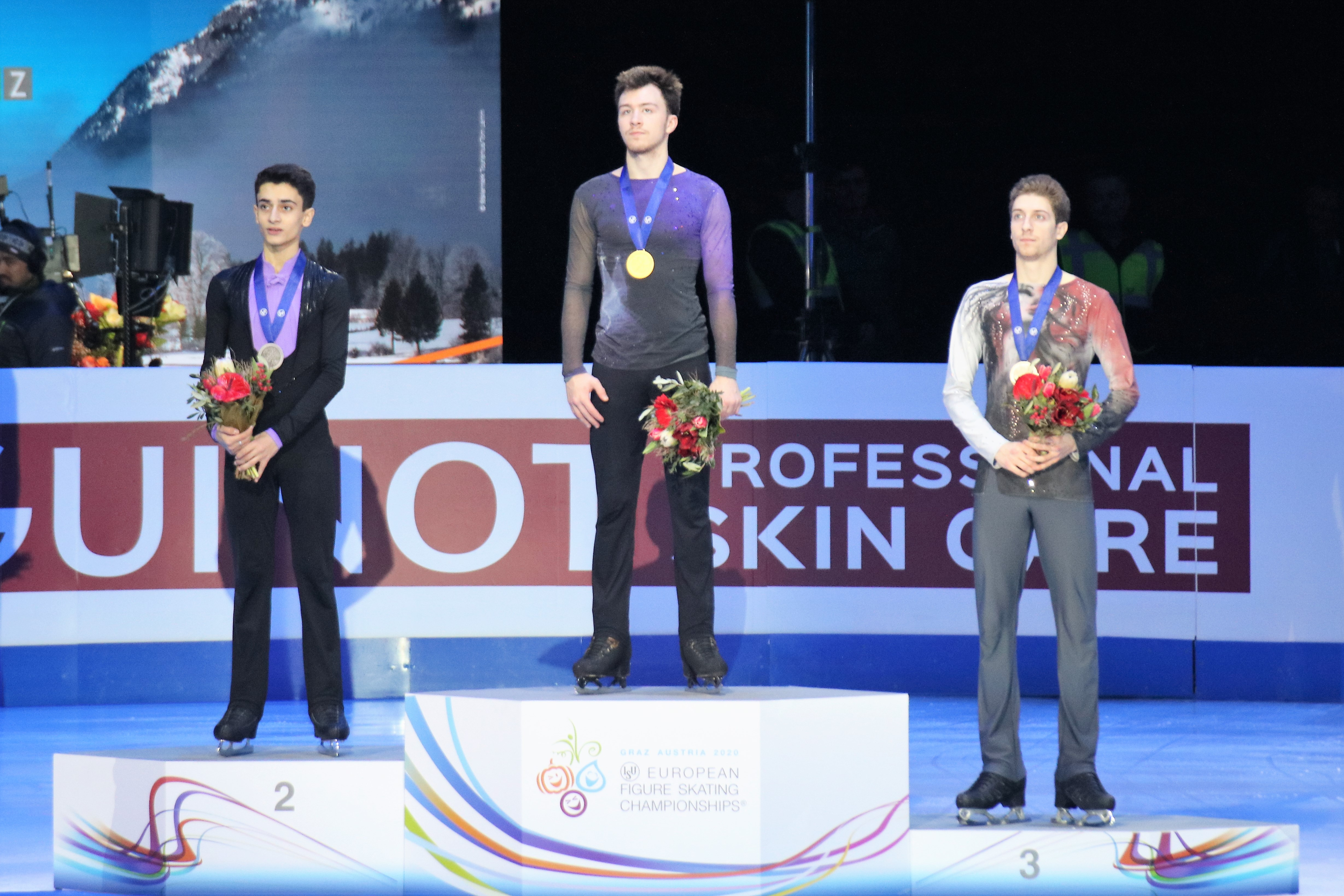
Men's medalists

Rank	Name	Nation	Total points	SP		FS	
1	Dmitri Aliev	Russia	272.89	2	88.45	1	184.44
2	Artur Danielian	Russia	246.74	3	84.63	4	162.11
3	Morisi Kvitelashvili	Georgia	246.71	4	82.77	3	163.94
4	Daniel Grassl	Italy	244.88	11	76.61	2	168.27
5	Matteo Rizzo	Italy	237.01	7	79.07	5	157.94
6	Deniss Vasiļjevs	Latvia	232.67	5	80.44	7	152.23
7	Michal Březina	Czech Republic	231.25	1	89.77	11	141.48
8	Paul Fentz	Germany	230.01	6	80.41	9	149.60
9	Vladimir Litvintsev	Azerbaijan	221.09	17	70.04	8	151.05
10	Alexander Samarin	Russia	220.43	13	74.77	10	145.66
11	Adam Siao Him Fa	France	219.89	24	65.21	6	154.68
12	Alexei Bychenko	Israel	219.03	8	78.27	13	140.76
13	Gabriele Frangipani	Italy	218.00	10	76.91	12	141.09
14	Irakli Maysuradze	Georgia	214.47	15	74.13	14	140.34
15	Nikolaj Majorov	Sweden	212.57	14	74.39	15	138.18
16	Aleksandr Selevko	Estonia	210.68	9	77.45	16	133.23
17	Mark Gorodnitsky	Israel	206.83	12	76.20	17	130.63
18	Slavik Hayrapetyan	Armenia	194.61	20	66.89	18	127.72
19	Lukas Britschgi	Switzerland	190.75	22	66.32	19	124.43
20	Matyáš Bělohradský	Czech Republic	190.54	18	67.69	20	122.85
21	Sondre Oddvoll Bøe	Norway	189.25	19	67.35	21	121.90
22	Alexander Lebedev	Belarus	188.00	21	66.43	22	121.57
23	Larry Loupolover	Bulgaria	177.26	16	70.36	24	106.90
24	Burak Demirboğa	Turkey	173.31	23	66.12	23	107.19
Did not advance to free skating
25	Illya Solomin	Sweden	64.91	25	64.91	—	
26	Kévin Aymoz	France	64.40	26	64.40	—	
27	Peter James Hallam	Great Britain	64.17	27	64.17	—	
28	Maurizio Zandron	Austria	62.45	28	62.45	—	
29	Davide Lewton Brain	Monaco	61.35	29	61.35	—	
30	Andrey Kokura	Ukraine	58.65	30	58.65	—	
31	Roman Galay	Finland	56.10	31	56.10	—	
32	Michael Neuman	Slovakia	53.08	32	53.08	—	
33	Thomas Kennes	Netherlands	52.56	33	52.56	—	
34	Conor Stakelum	Ireland	48.28	34	48.28	—	
35	András Csernoch	Hungary	47.30	35	47.30	—	

=== Ladies ===
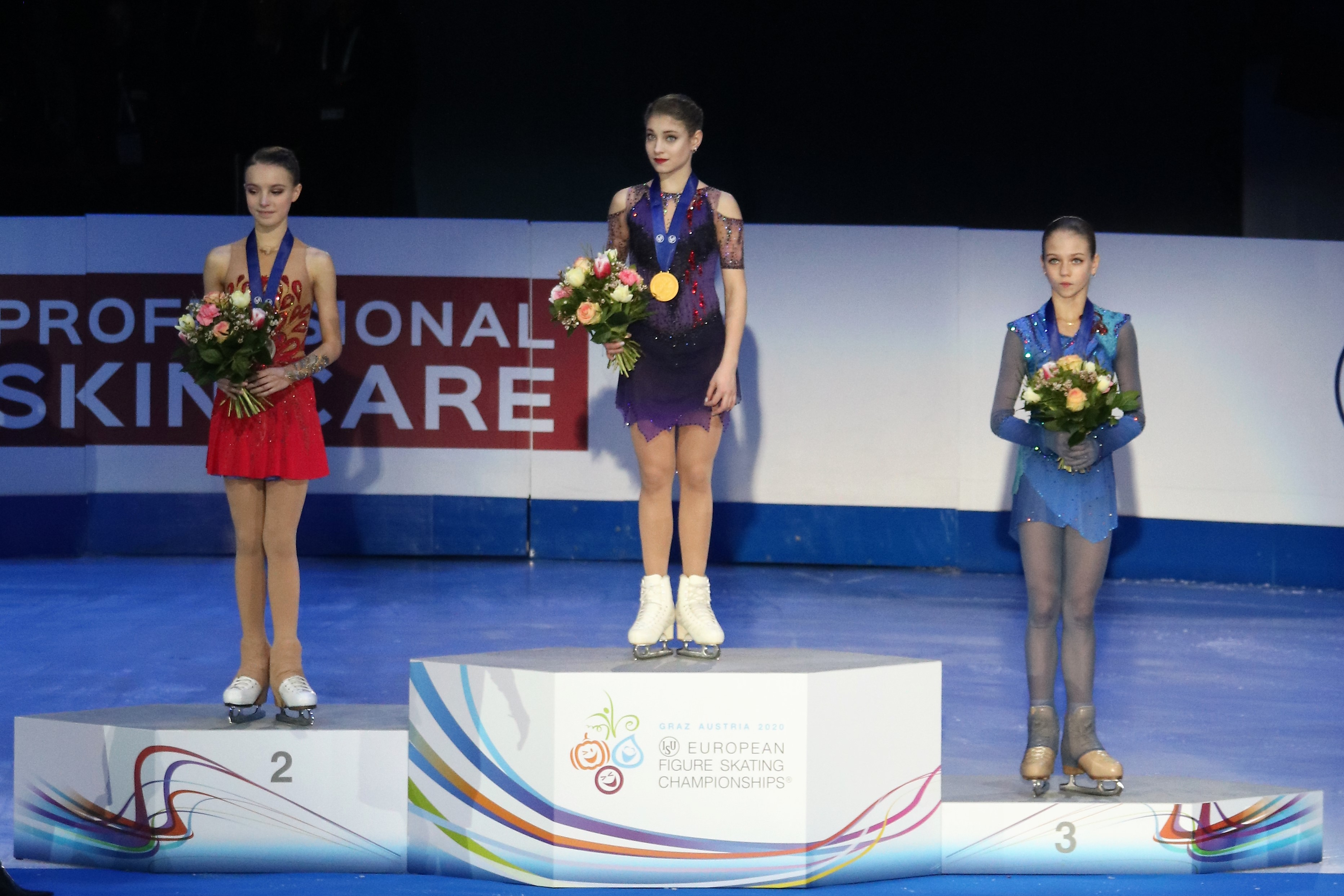
Ladies' medalists

Rank	Name	Nation	Total points	SP		FS	
1	Alena Kostornaia	Russia	240.81	1	84.92	2	155.89
2	Anna Shcherbakova	Russia	237.76	2	77.95	1	159.81
3	Alexandra Trusova	Russia	225.34	3	74.95	3	150.39
4	Alexia Paganini	Switzerland	192.88	4	68.82	4	124.06
5	Emmi Peltonen	Finland	181.79	5	66.49	7	115.30
6	Ekaterina Ryabova	Azerbaijan	181.49	6	62.22	6	119.27
7	Eva-Lotta Kiibus	Estonia	181.24	11	59.70	5	121.54
8	Alessia Tornaghi	Italy	172.17	7	61.27	11	110.90
9	Maé-Bérénice Méité	France	172.08	8	60.64	10	111.44
10	Ekaterina Kurakova	Poland	170.24	13	58.49	9	111.75
11	Maïa Mazzara	France	170.06	16	57.11	8	112.95
12	Linnea Ceder	Finland	166.16	15	58.01	12	108.15
13	Nicole Schott	Germany	162.26	14	58.06	14	104.20
14	Viktoriia Safonova	Belarus	159.91	20	53.33	13	106.58
15	Alina Urushadze	Georgia	154.81	12	59.56	18	95.25
16	Léa Serna	France	154.73	10	59.90	19	94.83
17	Alexandra Feigin	Bulgaria	154.43	18	53.87	16	100.56
18	Anita Östlund	Sweden	152.91	9	60.57	21	92.34
19	Yasmine Kimiko Yamada	Switzerland	152.62	24	51.77	15	100.85
20	Daša Grm	Slovenia	150.90	17	56.07	20	94.83
21	Ivett Tóth	Hungary	150.36	22	52.69	17	97.67
22	Eliška Březinová	Czech Republic	145.35	19	53.61	22	91.74
23	Natasha McKay	Great Britain	142.14	23	52.47	23	89.67
24	Olga Mikutina	Austria	130.15	21	53.19	24	76.96
Did not advance to free skating
25	Nelli Ioffe	Israel	51.70	25	51.70	—	
26	Aleksandra Golovkina	Lithuania	50.88	26	50.88	—	
27	Anastasia Galustyan	Armenia	50.08	27	50.08	—	
28	Valentina Matos	Spain	49.02	28	49.02	—	
29	Ema Doboszová	Slovakia	46.27	29	46.27	—	
30	Angelīna Kučvaļska	Latvia	45.09	30	45.09	—	
31	Antonina Dubinina	Serbia	43.62	31	43.62	—	
32	Sinem Kuyucu	Turkey	43.16	32	43.16	—	
33	Jenni Saarinen	Finland	42.61	33	42.61	—	
34	Anastasia Gozhva	Ukraine	40.49	34	40.49	—	
35	Niki Wories	Netherlands	38.19	35	38.19	—	
36	Klára Štěpánová	Czech Republic	37.83	36	37.83	—	
37	Hana Cvijanović	Croatia	36.22	37	36.22	—	

=== Pairs ===
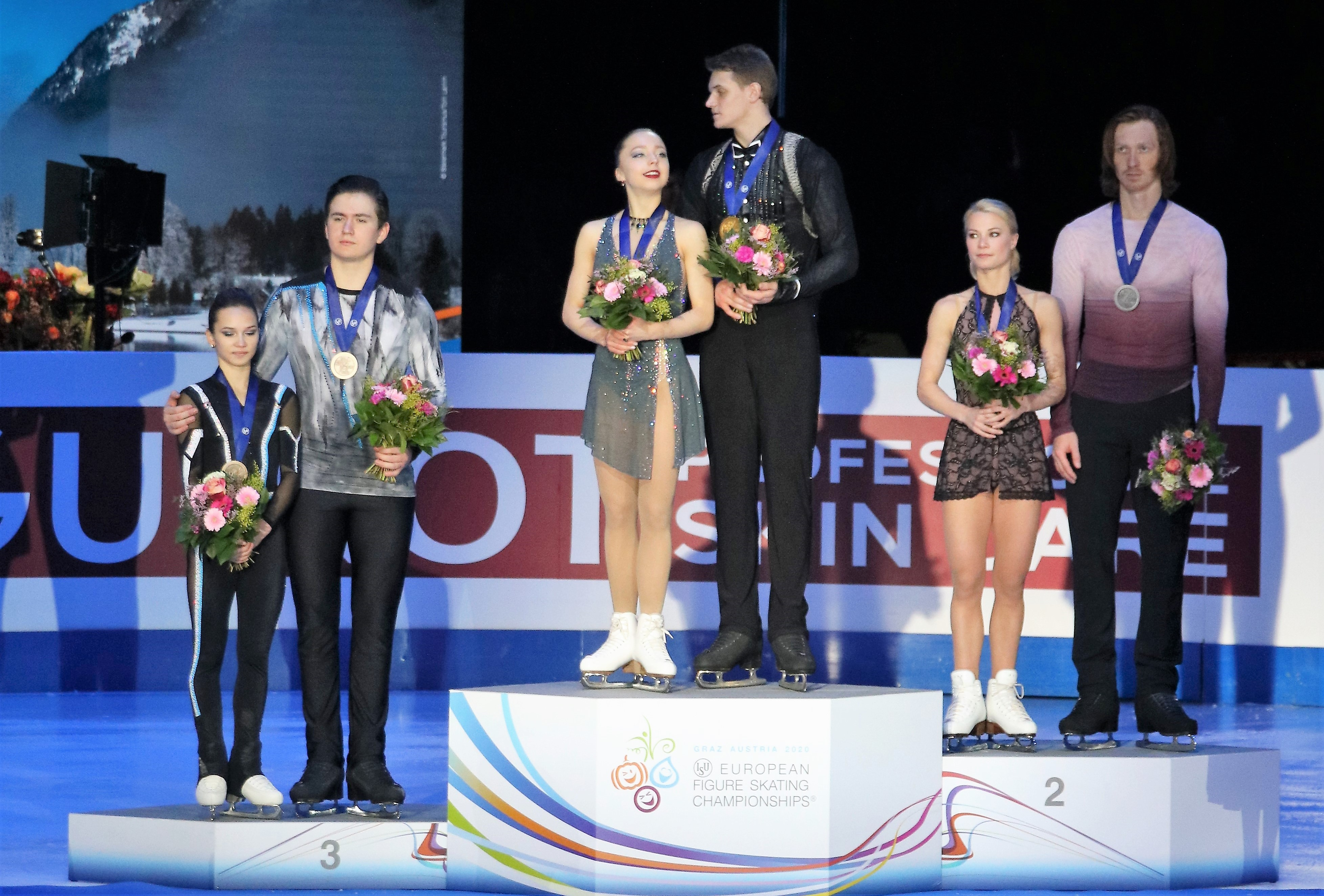
Pairs' medalists

Rank	Name	Nation	Total points	SP		FS	
1	Aleksandra Boikova / Dmitrii Kozlovskii	Russia	234.58	1	82.34	1	152.24
2	Evgenia Tarasova / Vladimir Morozov	Russia	208.64	3	73.50	2	135.14
3	Daria Pavliuchenko / Denis Khodykin	Russia	206.53	2	74.92	3	131.61
4	Nicole Della Monica / Matteo Guarise	Italy	194.44	4	70.48	4	123.96
5	Minerva Fabienne Hase / Nolan Seegert	Germany	186.39	5	70.43	5	115.96
6	Miriam Ziegler / Severin Kiefer	Austria	177.41	6	67.90	6	109.51
7	Annika Hocke / Robert Kunkel	Germany	166.10	7	58.43	7	107.67
8	Rebecca Ghilardi / Filippo Ambrosini	Italy	156.74	8	56.85	10	99.89
9	Cléo Hamon / Denys Strekalin	France	153.49	12	50.24	8	103.25
10	Ioulia Chtchetinina / Márk Magyar	Hungary	151.50	10	51.03	9	100.47
11	Coline Keriven / Noël-Antoine Pierre	France	150.10	9	51.47	11	98.63
12	Zoe Jones / Christopher Boyadji	Great Britain	147.94	11	50.96	12	96.98
13	Anna Vernikov / Evgeni Krasnopolski	Israel	145.35	13	49.34	13	96.01
14	Laura Barquero / Tòn Cónsul	Spain	135.68	15	46.79	14	88.89
15	Lana Petranović / Antonio Souza-Kordeiru	Croatia	134.57	14	48.78	15	85.79
16	Daria Danilova / Michel Tsiba	Netherlands	116.30	16	46.10	16	70.20
Did not advance to free skating
17	Dorota Broda / Pedro Betegón Martín	Spain	45.54	17	45.54	—	
18	Alexandra Herbríková / Nicolas Roulet	Switzerland	42.16	18	42.16	—	

- Sofiia Nesterova / Artem Darenskyi were disqualified.

=== Ice dance ===
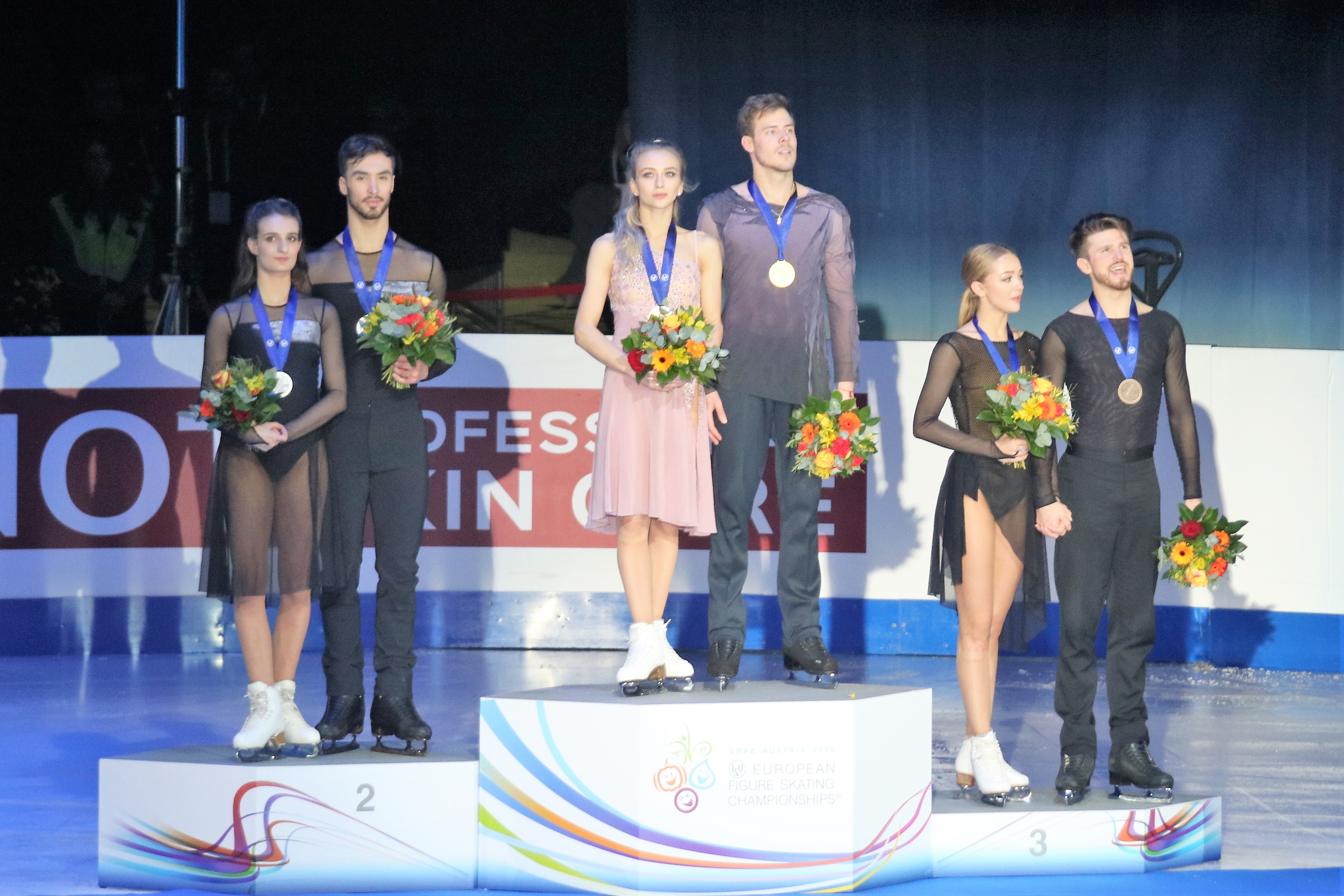
Ice dance medalists

Rank	Name	Nation	Total points	RD		FD	
1	Victoria Sinitsina / Nikita Katsalapov	Russia	220.42	2	88.73	1	131.69
2	Gabriella Papadakis / Guillaume Cizeron	France	220.28	1	88.78	2	131.50
3	Alexandra Stepanova / Ivan Bukin	Russia	211.29	4	83.65	3	127.64
4	Charlène Guignard / Marco Fabbri	Italy	205.58	3	84.66	4	120.92
5	Lilah Fear / Lewis Gibson	Great Britain	192.34	6	74.26	5	118.08
6	Tiffany Zahorski / Jonathan Guerreiro	Russia	188.03	5	75.10	6	112.93
7	Sara Hurtado / Kirill Khaliavin	Spain	185.84	7	73.44	7	112.40
8	Olivia Smart / Adrián Díaz	Spain	183.12	9	72.19	8	110.93
9	Natalia Kaliszek / Maksym Spodyriev	Poland	180.26	10	71.96	10	108.30
10	Oleksandra Nazarova / Maxim Nikitin	Ukraine	179.94	11	71.54	9	108.40
11	Allison Reed / Saulius Ambrulevičius	Lithuania	174.24	8	73.22	13	101.02
12	Adelina Galyavieva / Louis Thauron	France	172.15	13	66.85	12	105.30
13	Katharina Müller / Tim Dieck	Germany	167.44	18	61.42	11	106.02
14	Maria Kazakova / Georgy Reviya	Georgia	167.22	12	67.49	14	99.73
15	Evgeniia Lopareva / Geoffrey Brissaud	France	165.22	15	65.68	15	99.54
16	Jasmine Tessari / Francesco Fioretti	Italy	163.61	14	66.79	16	96.82
17	Tina Garabedian / Simon Proulx-Sénécal	Armenia	156.64	19	61.25	17	95.39
18	Yuka Orihara / Juho Pirinen	Finland	156.08	16	64.49	19	91.59
19	Natálie Taschlerová / Filip Taschler	Czech Republic	154.30	17	62.53	18	91.77
20	Victoria Manni / Carlo Röthlisberger	Switzerland	145.23	20	59.78	20	85.45
Did not advance to free dance
21	Robynne Tweedale / Joseph Buckland	Great Britain	59.25	21	59.25	—	
22	Justyna Plutowska / Jérémie Flemin	Poland	58.49	22	58.49	—	
23	Emiliya Kalehanova / Uladzislau Palkhouski	Belarus	51.10	23	51.10	—	
24	Emily Monaghan / Ilias Fourati	Hungary	50.22	24	50.22	—	
25	Mina Zdravkova / Christopher M. Davis	Bulgaria	48.25	25	48.25	—	
26	Nicole Kelly / Berk Akalın	Turkey	46.70	26	46.70	—	
27	Aurelija Ipolito / J.T. Michel	Latvia	45.62	27	45.62	—	
