= 2018 CS Inge Solar Memorial – Alpen Trophy =

- Type: ISU Challenger Series
- Date: November 11 – 18
- Season: 2018–19
- Location: Innsbruck, Austria
- Host: Skate Austria
- Venue: OlympiaWorld Innsbruck

Champions
- Men's singles: (Italy) Daniel Grassl
- Ladies' singles: (Russia) Anna Tarusina
- Pairs: (Russia) Anastasia Mishina and Aleksandr Galiamov
- Ice dance: (Italy) Charlène Guignard and Marco Fabbri
- Previous CS: 2018 CS Finlandia Trophy
- Next CS: 2018 CS Tallinn Trophy

The 2018 CS Inge Solar Memorial – Alpen Trophy was held on November 11–18, 2018, at the OlympiaWorld Innsbruck in Innsbruck, Austria. It was part of the 2018–19 ISU Challenger Series. Medals were awarded in men's singles, women's singles, pair skating, and ice dance.

== Entries ==
The International Skating Union published the list on entries on October 15, 2018.

Country	Men	Ladies	Pairs	Ice dance
Armenia	Slavik Hayrapetyan	—N/a	—N/a	—N/a
Australia	—N/a	Brooklee Han	—N/a	Matilda Friend / William Badaoui
Australia	—N/a	—N/a	—N/a	Chantelle Kerry / Andrew Dodds
Austria	Luc Maierhofer	Sophia Schaller	—N/a	—N/a
Bulgaria	—N/a	Simona Gospodinova	—N/a	Teodora Markova / Simon Daze
Bulgaria	—N/a	—N/a	—N/a	Mina Zdravkova / Christopher M. Davis
Canada	Roman Sadovsky	—N/a	—N/a	—N/a
China	—N/a	Chen Hongyi	—N/a	—N/a
Czech Republic	Radek Jakubka	Daniela Ko	—N/a	—N/a
Czech Republic	Georgii Reshtenko	—N/a	—N/a	—N/a
Estonia	Daniel Albert Naurits	Gerli Liinamäe	—N/a	—N/a
Estonia	Aleksandr Selevko	Kristina Shkuleta-Gromova	—N/a	—N/a
Finland	Valtter Virtanen	Emmi Peltonen	—N/a	—N/a
France	Joshua Rols	Julie Froetscher	—N/a	Marie-Jade Lauriault / Romain Le Gac
France	Adam Siao Him Fa	Laurine Lecavelier	—N/a	Julia Wagret / Pierre Souquet
Germany	Catalin Dimitrescu	Alissa Scheidt	—N/a	Shari Koch / Christian Nüchtern
Germany	Jonathan Hess	—N/a	—N/a	Jennifer Urban / Benjamin Steffan
Germany	Thomas Stoll	—N/a	—N/a	—N/a
Great Britain	Harry Mattick	Anna Litvinenko	—N/a	—N/a
Great Britain	—N/a	Natasha McKay	—N/a	—N/a
Great Britain	—N/a	Karly Robertson	—N/a	—N/a
Indonesia	—N/a	Tasya Putri	—N/a	—N/a
Italy	Mattia Dalla Torre	Sara Conti	Rebecca Ghilardi / Filippo Ambrosini	Charlène Guignard / Marco Fabbri
Italy	Daniel Grassl	Elisabetta Leccardi	—N/a	Carolina Moscheni / Andrea Fabbri
Italy	Jari Kessler	Roberta Rodeghiero	—N/a	—N/a
Liechtenstein	—N/a	Romana Kaiser	—N/a	—N/a
Lithuania	—N/a	Elžbieta Kropa	—N/a	—N/a
Lithuania	—N/a	Greta Morkytė	—N/a	—N/a
New Zealand	—N/a	Sarah Isabella Bardua	—N/a	—N/a
Poland	Igor Reznichenko	—N/a	—N/a	Justyna Plutowska / Jérémie Flemin
Romania	—N/a	Julia Sauter	—N/a	—N/a
Russia	Konstantin Miliukov	Daria Panenkova	Anastasia Mishina / Aleksandr Galiamov	Anastasia Shpilevaya / Grigory Smirnov
Russia	—N/a	Serafima Sakhanovich	—N/a	—N/a
Russia	—N/a	Anna Tarusina	—N/a	—N/a
Slovakia	Marco Klepoch	—N/a	—N/a	—N/a
South Korea	Byun Se-jong	Park So-youn	—N/a	—N/a
South Korea	Park Sung-hoon	—N/a	—N/a	—N/a
Spain	—N/a	Valentina Matos	—N/a	—N/a
Sweden	—N/a	Anita Östlund	—N/a	—N/a
Switzerland	Lukas Britschgi	Yasmine Kimiko Yamada	—N/a	Victoria Manni / Carlo Roethlisberger
Thailand	Micah Kai Lynette	Thita Lamsam	—N/a	—N/a
United Arab Emirates	—N/a	Zahra Lari	—N/a	—N/a
United States	Tomoki Hiwatashi	Ashley Lin	—N/a	Lorraine McNamara / Quinn Carpenter
United States	Camden Pulkinen	—N/a	—N/a	—N/a

=== Changes to preliminary assignments ===
Date	Discipline	Withdrew	Added	Notes	Ref.
October 17	Ladies	(Austria) Alisa Stomakhina	—N/a		
October 18	Men	(Russia) Maxim Kovtun	—N/a		
October 18	Ladies	(Russia) Anastasiia Gubanova	(Russia) Serafima Sakhanovich		
October 18	Ice dance	(China) Chen Hong / Sun Zhuoming	—N/a		
October 22	Ice dance	(Russia) Victoria Sinitsina / Nikita Katsalapov	(Australia) Matilda Friend / William Badaoui		
October 22	Ladies	NA	(United Arab Emirates) Zahra Lari		
October 26	Ladies	(Canada) Aurora Cotop	—N/a		
October 29	Pairs	(United Kingdom) Zoe Jones / Christopher Boyadji	—N/a	No longer enough pairs entries to be considered a CS event	
November 2	Men	(Czech Republic) Tomáš Kupkaa	—N/a		
November 2	Men	(Hong Kong) Adonis Wai Chung Wong	—N/a		
November 2	Ladies	(Czech Republic) Michaela Lucie Hanzlíková	—N/a		
November 2	Ladies	(Germany) Lea Johanna Dastich	(Germany) Alissa Scheidt		
November 5	Men	(Sweden) Gabriel Folkesson	—N/a		
November 5	Pairs	(Spain) Laura Barquero / Aritz Maestu	—N/a	Conflict with GP assignment	
November 5	Ice dance	(United Kingdom) Lilah Fear / Lewis Gibson	—N/a	Conflict with GP assignment	
November 6	Ladies	(Australia) Kailani Craine	—N/a	Conflict with GP assignment	
November 7	Ladies	(South Korea) Choi Da-bin	—N/a	Boot issues	
November 7	Ladies	(South Korea) Jang Eun-sol	—N/a		
November 7	Pairs	(United States) Sarah Feng / TJ Nyman	—N/a		
November 9	Men	(China) Fang Shuai	—N/a		
November 12	Men	(Austria) Manuel Drechsler	—N/a		
November 13	Ladies	(Austria) Natalie Klotz	—N/a		
November 13	Ladies	(Germany) Lutricia Bock	—N/a		
November 13	Ladies	(Germany) Nathalie Weinzierl	—N/a		
November 13	Ladies	(Lithuania) Paulina Ramanauskaitė	—N/a		

== Results ==
=== Men's singles ===
Rank	Skater	Nation	Total points	SP		FS	
1st place, gold medalist(s)	Daniel Grassl	Italy	230.50	1	83.42	1	147.08
2nd place, silver medalist(s)	Roman Sadovsky	Canada	204.95	2	77.91	5	127.04
3rd place, bronze medalist(s)	Tomoki Hiwatashi	United States	199.21	3	77.22	7	121.99
4	Konstantin Miliukov	Russia	199.19	5	71.44	4	127.75
5	Luc Maierhofer	Austria	198.29	7	66.32	2	131.97
6	Camden Pulkinen	United States	196.55	4	71.85	6	124.70
7	Adam Siao Him Fa	France	187.90	13	59.24	3	128.66
8	Thomas Stoll	Germany	183.82	6	67.69	12	116.13
9	Lukas Britschgi	Switzerland	182.27	9	62.16	9	120.11
10	Valtter Virtanen	Finland	180.96	9	62.16	11	118.80
11	Micah Kai Lynette	Thailand	180.88	11	61.64	10	119.24
12	Radek Jakuba	Czech Republic	180.22	16	58.36	8	121.86
13	Mattia Dalla Torre	Italy	171.49	8	66.00	18	105.49
14	Slavik Hayrapetyan	Armenia	170.72	17	58.08	14	112.64
15	Catalin Dimitrescu	Germany	169.12	15	58.40	15	110.72
16	Jari Kessler	Italy	167.00	14	58.94	16	108.06
17	Daniel Albert Naurits	Estonia	165.35	21	51.16	13	114.19
18	Aleksandr Selevko	Estonia	165.17	18	58.07	17	107.10
19	Harry Mattick	Great Britain	155.23	22	49.89	19	105.34
20	Igor Reznichenko	Poland	154.77	12	59.36	20	95.41
21	Park Sung-hoon	South Korea	134.41	26	42.54	21	91.87
22	Byun Se-jong	South Korea	133.65	19	52.22	23	81.43
23	Georgii Reshtenko	Czech Republic	132.60	23	48.70	22	83.90
24	Joshua Rols	France	125.25	25	44.36	24	80.89
25	Marco Klepoch	Slovakia	119.64	24	44.38	25	75.26
WD	Jonathan Hess	Germany	withdrew	20	51.50	withdrew from competition	

=== Ladies' singles ===
Rank	Skater	Nation	Total points	SP		FS	
1st place, gold medalist(s)	Anna Tarusina	Russia	198.76	1	67.48	1	131.28
2nd place, silver medalist(s)	Serafima Sakhanovich	Russia	174.36	4	58.16	2	116.20
3rd place, bronze medalist(s)	Brooklee Han	Australia	165.40	2	62.14	7	103.26
4	Ashley Lin	United States	165.34	12	50.63	3	114.71
5	Laurine Lecavelier	France	162.78	5	56.12	4	106.66
6	Roberta Rodeghiero	Italy	160.66	6	55.50	6	105.16
7	Karly Robertson	Great Britain	156.93	11	51.35	5	105.58
8	Park So-youn	South Korea	152.94	3	58.94	9	94.00
9	Natasha McKay	Great Britain	146.01	17	47.79	8	98.22
10	Chen Hongyi	China	143.90	8	54.82	11	89.08
11	Gerli Liinamäe	Estonia	140.62	14	49.30	10	91.32
12	Greta Morkytė	Lithuania	136.87	15	48.89	12	87.98
13	Sara Conti	Italy	136.41	9	52.31	18	84.10
14	Julia Sauter	Romania	133.00	16	48.74	17	84.26
15	Kristina Shkuleta-Gromova	Estonia	132.95	18	46.01	15	86.94
16	Anita Östlund	Sweden	132.74	10	51.57	20	81.17
17	Sophia Schaller	Austria	130.35	20	44.60	16	85.45
18	Julie Froetscher	France	128.44	22	40.56	13	87.88
19	Valentina Matos	Spain	127.98	19	45.98	19	82.00
20	Yasmine Kimiko Yamada	Switzerland	125.94	25	38.89	14	87.05
21	Alissa Scheidt	Germany	123.84	7	54.97	23	68.87
22	Elisabetta Leccardi	Italy	123.39	21	44.31	21	79.08
23	Anna Litvinenko	Great Britain	116.73	23	40.49	22	76.24
24	Romana Kaiser	Liechtenstein	94.62	29	31.04	24	63.58
25	Daniela Ko	Czech Republic	93.70	27	31.33	25	62.37
26	Simona Gospodinova	Bulgaria	84.79	26	31.42	27	53.37
27	Sarah Isabella Bardua	New Zealand	81.86	30	29.38	28	52.48
28	Zahra Lari	United Arab Emirates	76.58	31	21.66	26	54.92
29	Thita Lamsam	Thailand	72.03	28	31.10	29	40.93
WD	Emmi Peltonen	Finland	withdrew	13	49.32	withdrew from competition	
WD	Elžbieta Kropa	Lithuania	withdrew	24	40.07	withdrew from competition	
WD	Daria Panenkova	Indonesia	withdrew from competition				
WD	Tasya Putri	Russia	withdrew from competition				

=== Pairs ===
For this category, the 2018 Inge Solar Memorial – Alpen Trophy was not considered a Challenger Series event, since the minimum required number of entries for a Challenger Series event was not reached.

Rank	Team	Nation	Total points	SP		FS	
1st place, gold medalist(s)	Anastasia Mishina / Aleksandr Galiamov	Russia	192.75	1	64.38	1	128.37
2nd place, silver medalist(s)	Rebecca Ghilardi / Filippo Ambrosini	Italy	163.74	2	55.15	2	108.59
WD	Jessica Calalang / Brian Johnson	United States	withdrew from competition				

=== Ice dance ===
Rank	Team	Nation	Total points	RD		FD	
1st place, gold medalist(s)	Charlène Guignard / Marco Fabbri	Italy	195.39	1	76.96	1	118.43
2nd place, silver medalist(s)	Lorraine McNamara / Quinn Carpenter	United States	174.35	2	68.69	3	105.66
3rd place, bronze medalist(s)	Marie-Jade Lauriault / Romain Le Gac	France	171.46	3	65.08	2	106.38
4	Anastasia Shpilevaya / Grigory Smirnov	Russia	158.65	4	63.43	5	95.22
5	Justyna Plutowska / Jérémie Flemin	Poland	152.49	6	56.22	4	96.27
6	Shari Koch / Christian Nüchtern	Germany	148.94	5	57.25	7	91.69
7	Julia Wagret / Pierre Souquet	France	147.03	8	54.62	6	92.41
8	Jennifer Urban / Benjamin Steffan	Germany	144.19	7	56.03	8	88.16
9	Carolina Moscheni / Andrea Fabbri	Italy	137.83	10	50.81	9	87.02
10	Victoria Manni / Carlo Roethlisberger	Switzerland	131.93	9	51.88	10	80.05
11	Chantelle Kerry / Andrew Dodds	Australia	125.08	11	45.65	11	79.43
12	Matilda Friend / William Badaoui	Australia	118.39	13	44.39	12	74.00
13	Teodora Markova / Simon Daze	Bulgaria	117.84	12	44.71	13	73.13
14	Mina Zdravkova / Christopher M. Davis	Bulgaria	104.70	14	36.70	14	68.00
