= Christopher Martin Davis =

Bulgarian ice dancer (born 1994)

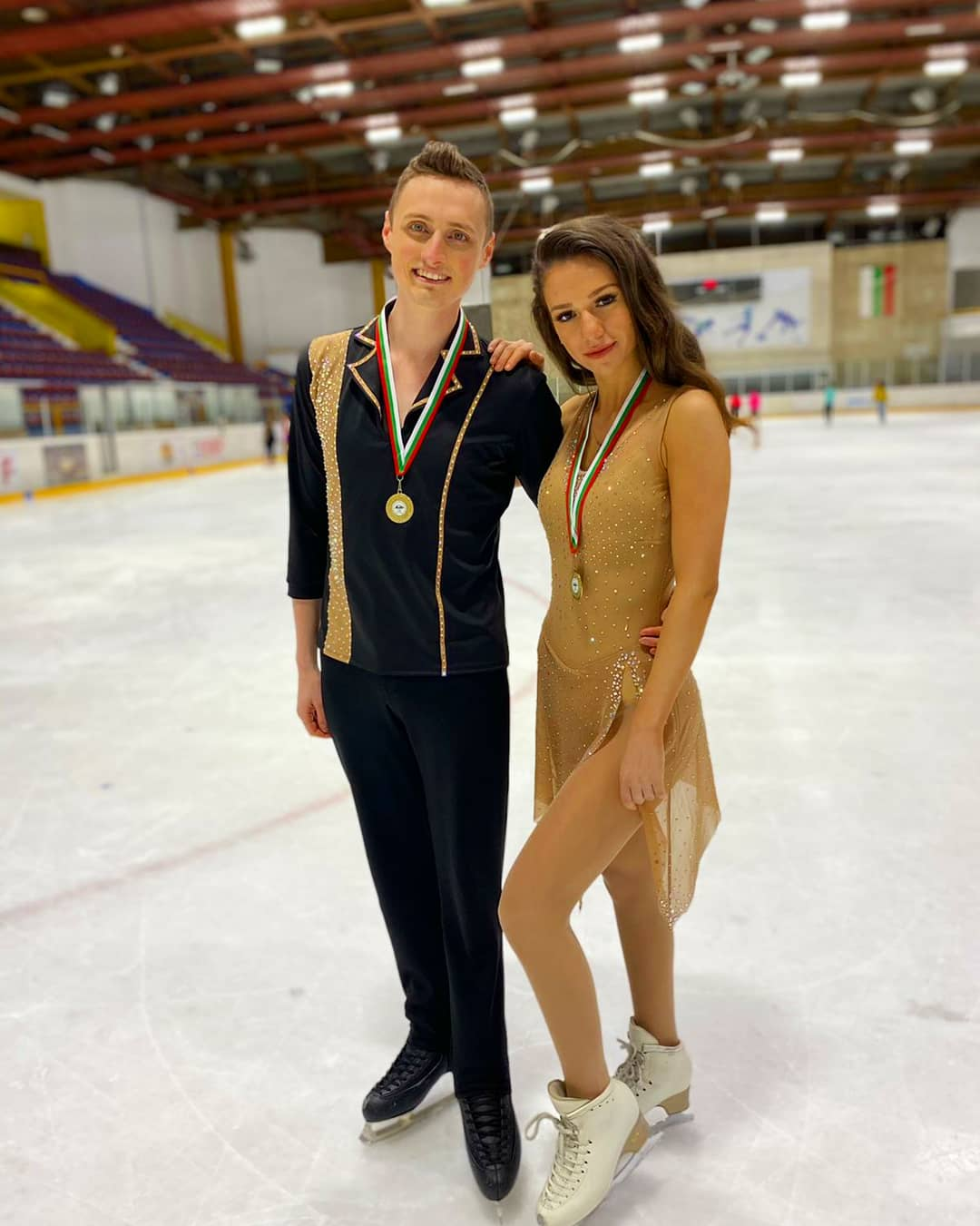
- Davis and Mina Zdravkova at the 2020 Bulgarian Figure Skating Championships

Personal information
- Other names: Кристофър Мартин Дейвис
- Born: 1 March 1994 (age 32) Chicago, USA
- Height: 1.76 m (5 ft 9 in)

Figure skating career
- Country: Bulgaria
- Partner: Mina Zdravkova
- Coach: Marika Humphreys-Baranova, Vitaliy Baranov
- Skating club: Denkova Staviski - Dance on Ice
- Began skating: 2001

Christopher Martin Davis (born 1 March 1994) is a competitive ice dancer for Bulgaria. With partner Mina Zdravkova, he is the 2020 Bulgarian Ice Dance Champion, Silver Medallist at 2020 Jégvirág Cup, Bronze Medallist at 2019 NRW Trophy, and the Bulgarian representative at the 2020 European Figure Skating Championships and 2021 World Figure Skating Championships. Originally a U.S. citizen, Davis became a naturalized Bulgarian citizen in 2019 and has demonstrated his knowledge of the Bulgarian language in television interviews.

== Personal life ==
Davis was born in Chicago, Illinois. He studied communications at the University of Florida. He abides by a vegan diet and has collaborated with Peta to promote ethical eating. He believes that figure skating should be a welcoming place for diverse groups of athletes, and advocates for adult skating, for inclusive programing for athletes with disabilities, and for the mitigation of elitism and exclusivity in the sport. He is a trustee of the charity Inclusive Skating.

== Early career ==
Davis started skating in 1999 in hockey courses at The Robert Crown Community Center in Evanston Illinois. He started training in ice dancing in 2008 with Angelina Giordano under coach Christopher Hyland. With Giordano, Davis won the 2010 US Junior National Title at the juvenile level. Giordano and Davis terminated their partnership in 2012 due to different goals. His early career coaches included: Christopher Hyland, Jamie Whyte, Eve Chalom, Kendra Goodwin, Benjamin Delmas and Christophe Lecomte.

== Career ==
In 2014 Davis partnered with Mina Zdravkova.Together they won the 2014/15 Bulgarian junior ice dance title. In 2015, Davis sustained a serious shoulder injury for which he underwent keyhole surgery in the USA. Post surgery, a significant recovery and rehab period was required away from the ice. The surgery was not successful, and the injury returned early in the 2016/17 season. A second surgery was conducted in Bulgaria in 2016 and was successful at abating any further problems. Starting in 2016 Zdravkova and Davis were coached solely by Marika Humphreys-Baranova and Vitaliy Baranov. Zdravkova and Davis returned to national level competition at the 2016/17 Bulgarian figure skating championships where they reclaimed their title.In 2018 Zdravkova and Davis first performed a program set to Bulgarian folk music. Their performance of this program at the 2019 Winter Universiade went viral in Bulgaria in 2019, amassing millions of views. During the 2019/20 season, Zdravkova and Davis qualified and competed at the 2020 European Figure Skating Championships placing 25th. The team also qualified for the 2020 World figure skating championships, but the event was cancelled due to COVID-19.Due to COVID-19 Zdravkova and Davis were unable to train on the ice for over 7 months. During this time they trained off-ice and made several PSAs for Bulgarian media urging compliance with public health safety measures. In December 2020, the Bulgarian National Championships were postponed until February 2021. Zdravkova and Davis reclaimed their title and were named to the world team. Zdravkova and Davis competed at the 2021 World Figure Skating Championships which were held in a bubble for the first time due to COVID-19 safety precautions, and placed 31st.

== Programs - with Mina Zdravkova ==
Season	Short/Rhythm Dance	Free Dance
2014/15	Samba & Latin rhythms Loca [changed to La Tortura later in season] (Shakira) Hay Amores (Shakira) Hips Don't Lie (Shakira: Bambo remix)	Gladiator Soundtrack : Gladiator (Hans Zimmer & Lisa Gerrard)
2015/16	Waltz and Polka And The Waltz Goes On (Andrei Reiu) Polka (Unknown)	Beyoncé inspired medley Drunk in Love (Post modern jukebox) At Last (Beyoncé) Crazy in Love (Beyoncé: 50 Shades of Grey Soundtrack) Crazy in Love (Emilie Sande: Great Gatsby Soundtrack)
2016/17	Blues and Hip-Hop I Put a Spell on You (Nina Simone) I Put a Spell on You (Young Bosnia Trap Remix)	Arabian Inspired Sirocco (Momo & Christophe Goze) Caleludemco (Bruno Montal) Layali (Al Sharq)
2017/18	Rhumba & Latin rhythms Samba Vocalizado (Luciano Perrone) Safari (J Balvin) Abre Que Voy (Miguel Enriquez)	Chicago Movie Musical Cell Block Tango All I Care About Is Love
2018/19	Tango & Spanish rhythms Selections from Carmen (Bizet)	Bulgarian Folk Music Ergen Deda (Pendara Ethno Project) Vecherai Rado (Slavi Trifanov, Desislava Dobreva & Ki-Ki Bend)
2019/20	Quickstep & related rhythms From Chicago Movie Musical Funny honey (Rene Zelweiger) We both reached for the gun (Richard Gere & ensemble) Nowadays/hot honey rag (Catherine Zeta Jone, Rene Zelweiger)	Bulgarian Folk Music Ergen Deda (Pendara Ethno Project) Vecherai Rado (Slavi Trifanov, Desislava Dobreva & Ki-Ki Bend)

== Results - with Mina Zdravkova for Bulgaria ==
International
Event	14–15	16–17	17–18	18–19	19–20	20–21
Worlds					C	31st
Europeans					25th	
Winter Universiade				13th		
CS Finlandia Trophy				11th		
CS Lombardia Trophy		7th				
CS Inge Solar Memorial				14th		
NRW Trophy					3rd	
Jégvirág Cup					2nd	
Bosphorus Cup			4th		10th	
Ice Star				7th		
Halloween Cup					6th	
Volvo Open Cup					8th	
Santa Claus Cup			10th		8th	
Open d'Andorra			10th			
Mentor Toruń Cup					15th	
Egna Dance Trophy					11th	
International: Junior
Bavarian Open	15th					
Mentor Toruń Cup	21st					
National
Bulgarian Champs.	1st		1st		1st	1st
