= Aleksandr Selevko =

Estonian figure skater (born 2001)

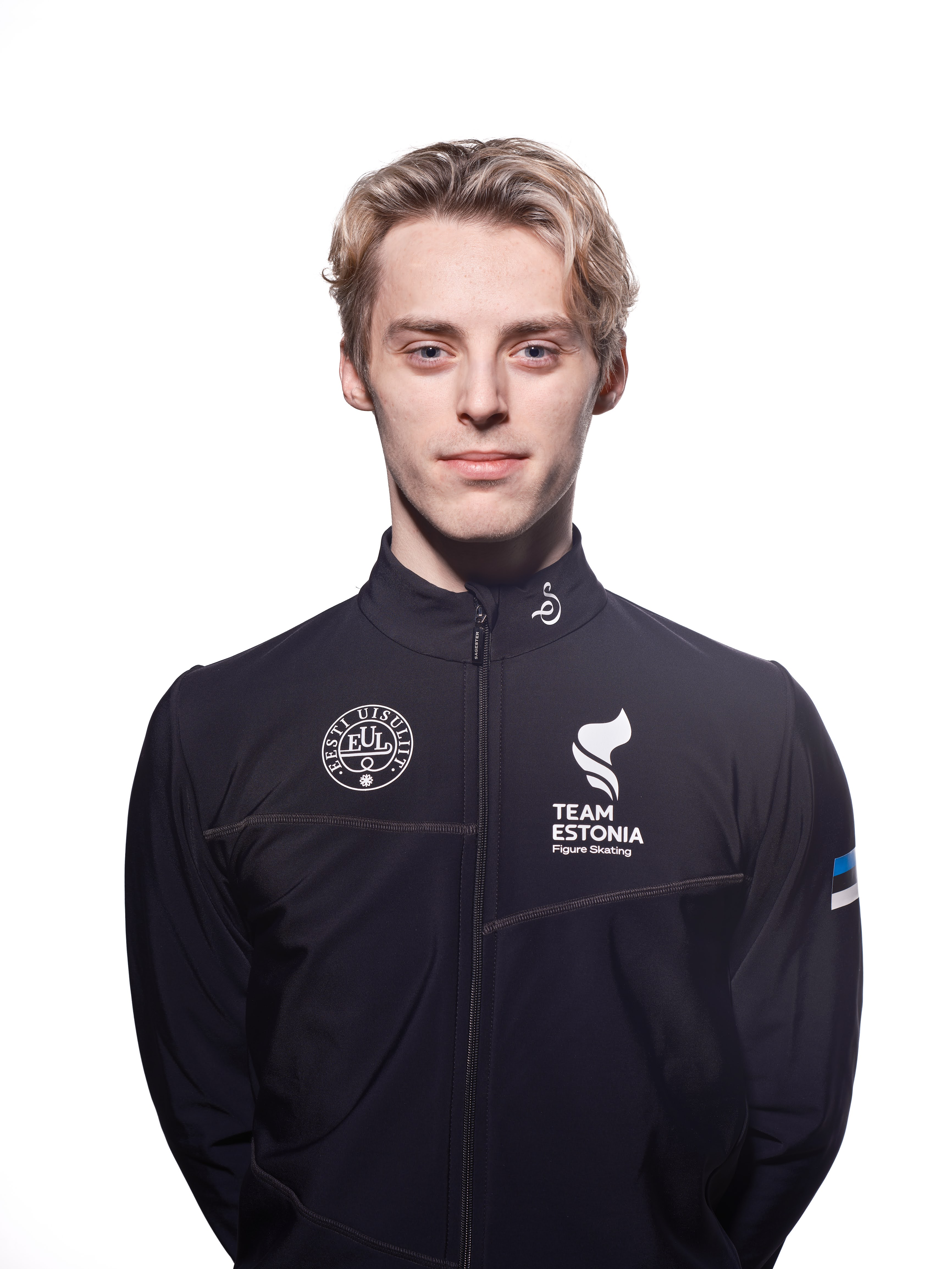
- Aleksandr Selevko in 2025

Personal information
- Born: 23 May 2001 (age 25) Jõgeva, Estonia
- Home town: Tallinn, Estonia
- Height: 1.74 m (5 ft 9 in)

Figure skating career
- Country: Estonia
- Discipline: Men's singles
- Coach: Alexei Letov; Olga Ganicheva; Irina Kononova; Rafael Arutyunyan
- Skating club: Kristalluisk Tallinn
- Began skating: 2004
- Highest WS: 30th (2020–21)

Medal record
European Championships
Silver medal – second place	2024 Kaunas	Singles
Estonian Championships
Gold medal – first place	2020 Tallinn	Singles
Gold medal – first place	2021 Tallinn	Singles
Gold medal – first place	2022 Tallinn	Singles
Gold medal – first place	2026 Tallinn	Singles
Silver medal – second place	2016 Tallinn	Singles
Silver medal – second place	2023 Tallinn	Singles
Silver medal – second place	2024 Tallinn	Singles
Silver medal – second place	2025 Tallinn	Singles
Bronze medal – third place	2015 Tallinn	Singles
Bronze medal – third place	2019 Tallinn	Singles

Aleksandr Selevko (born 23 May 2001) is an Estonian figure skater. He is the 2024 European silver medalist, the 2025 Skate Canada International silver medalist, a nine-time ISU Challenger Series medalist, the 2019 Nordics bronze medalist, and a four-time Estonian national champion (2020–22, 2026).

Selevko is the first Estonian skater to win a medal at a senior international championship and the first Estonian men's skater to win a medal at an ISU Grand Prix.

He represented Estonia at the 2022 Winter Olympics and the 2026 Winter Olympics.

== Personal life ==
Selevko was born on 23 May 2001 in Jõgeva, Estonia. His mother Galina is an accountant, and his father Anatoli is a computer programmer. Selevko's younger brother, Mihhail, also represents Estonia internationally in figure skating.

== Career ==
=== Early career ===
Selevko began figure skating in 2004.

He won gold at the 2014 Estonian Novice Championships.

=== 2014–15 season: Junior debut ===
Selevko made his debut on the Junior Grand Prix series, finishing eighteenth at the 2014 JGP Czech Republic and twenty-first at the 2014 JGP Estonia. He then competed at the 2014 Ice Star, where he placed seventh.

At the 2015 Estonian Championships, Selevko won the bronze medal at both the senior and junior events. Selevko finished his season at 2015 Skate Helena and the 2015 Rostelecom Crystal Skate, finishing fifth at both events.

=== 2015–16 season ===
Competing on the Junior Grand Prix series, Selevko placed twentieth at the 2015 JGP Latvia. He then went on to compete at the 2015 Ice Star, where he won the bronze medal. Selevko also went to place ninth at the 2015 Volvo Open Cup and place eighth at the 2015 Tallinn Trophy.

At the 2016 Estonian Championships, Selevko won the silver medal at both the senior and junior events. He then competed at the 2015 Mentor Toruń Cup, where he finished fourth.

Competing at the 2016 World Junior Championships in Debrecen, Hungary, Selevko finished eighteenth.

=== 2016–17 season: Senior debut ===
Starting his season at the 2016 Lombardia Trophy, Selevko placed fourth on the junior level. Competing on the Junior Grand Prix series, Selevko placed sixth at the 2016 JGP Estonia and eleventh at the 2016 JGP Germany.

Making his senior international debut, Selevko finished eleventh at the 2016 Golden Bear of Zagreb and eighth at the 2016 Volvo Open Cup. At the 2017 Estonian Junior Championships, Selevko won the silver medal.

Selected to compete at the 2017 European Youth Olympic Festival, Selevko finished sixth. He then competed on the senior level at the 2017 Cup of Tyrol, finishing fifteenth, before closing his season with a bronze medal at the 2017 Egna Spring Trophy.

=== 2017–18 season ===
Selevko started the season with sixteenth-place finish at the 2017 CS Lombardia Trophy, before going on to finish eighteenth at the 2017 CS Nebelhorn Trophy. He then competed at the 2017 CS Tallinn Trophy, where he placed ninth.

At the 2018 Estonian Junior Championships, Selevko won the gold medal. He went on to compete at the 2018 World Junior Championships in Sofia, Bulgaria, where he finished twenty-seventh.

=== 2018–19 season ===
Selevko began the season on the 2018–19 Junior Grand Prix series, finishing fifteenth at the 2018 JGP Slovenia. He went on to finish eighteenth at the 2018 CS Alphen Trophy and twelfth at the 2018 CS Tallinn Trophy. At the 2019 Estonian Championships, Selevko won the bronze medal.

Competing at the 2019 European Championships in Minsk, Belarus, Selevko finished in seventeenth place. He then went on to compete at the 2019 Tallink Hotels Cup and 2019 Jégvirág Cup, winning silver at both events. Selevko also competed at the 2019 Nordic Championships, taking the bronze medal.

Making his World Championship debut at the 2019 World Championships in Saitama, Japan, Selevko placed twenty-seventh in the short program and failed to qualify for the free skate segment of the competition.

=== 2019–20 season: First national title ===
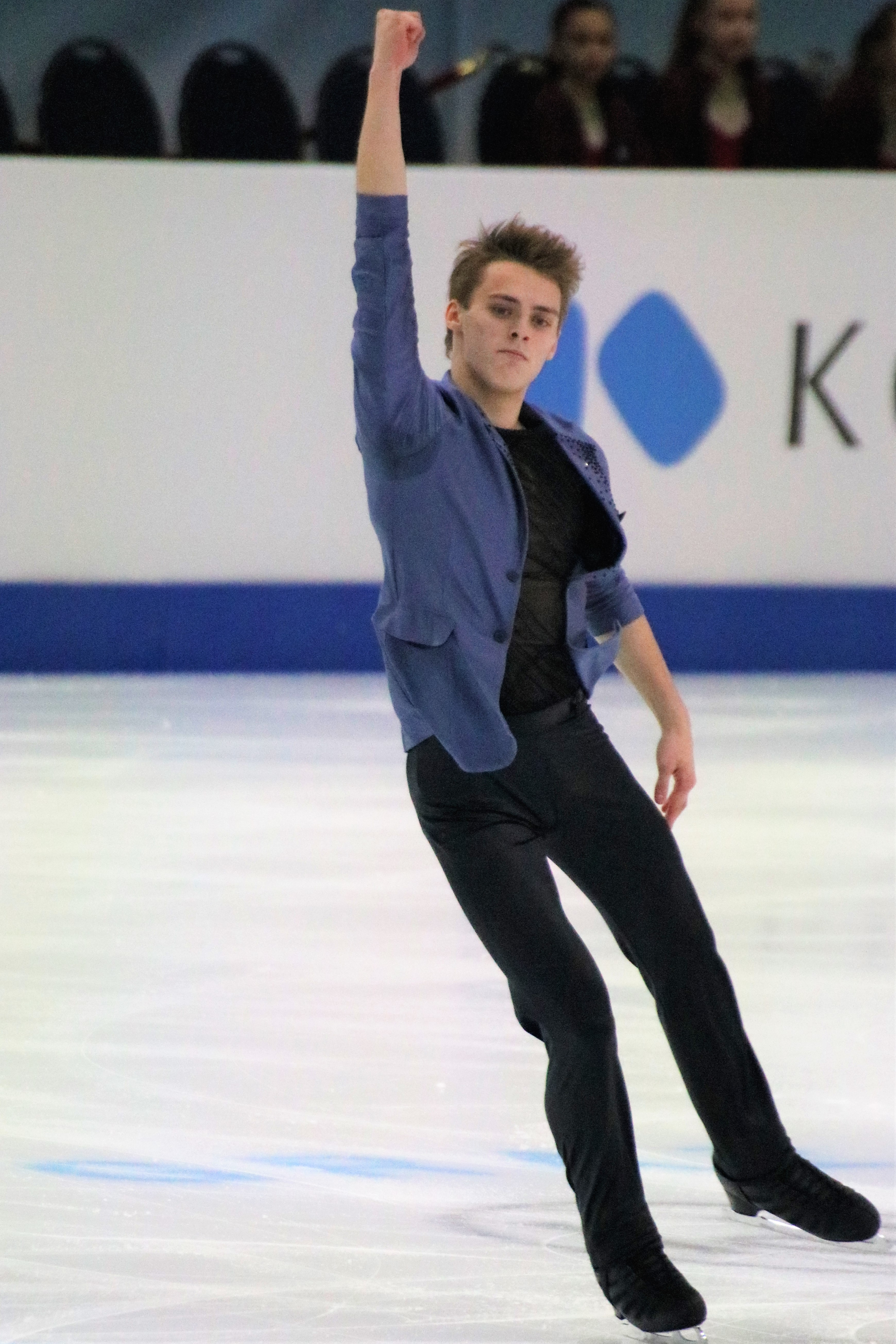
Selevko at the 2020 European Championships

Selevko started the season on the Junior Grand Prix series, finishing fifth at the 2019 JGP Latvia and eighth at the 2019 JGP Poland. He went on to compete at the 2019 CS Finlandia Trophy, where he placed fifth, before going on to compete at the 2019 CS Ice Star, where he finished fourth. He then competed at the 2019 Tallinn Trophy as well as the 2019 CS Golden Spin of Zagreb, placing second and fifth, respectively.

At the 2020 Estonian Championships, Selevko won his first senior national title. He then went on to compete at the 2020 Tallink Hotels Cup, where he won the bronze medal.

Competing at the 2020 European Championships in Graz, Austria, Selevko finished in sixteenth place. At the 2020 World Junior Championships in Tallinn, Estonia, Selevko placed ninth. Although assigned to compete at the 2020 World Championships in Montreal, Quebec, the event was ultimately cancelled due to concerns regarding the COVID-19 pandemic.

=== 2020–21 season ===
Selevko began his season at the 2020 CS Nebelhorn Trophy, finishing seventh, before going on to win bronze at the 2020 CS Budapest Trophy. Selevko then went on to win his second senior national title at the 2021 Estonian Championships. He also took gold at the 2021 Tallink Hotels Cup.

At the 2021 World Championships in Stockholm, Sweden, Selevko placed 24th in the short program, 15th in the free skate, and 16th overall. As a result of his placement, Estonia earned an Olympic spot in men's singles.

=== 2021–22 season: Beijing Olympics ===
Selevko began his season at the 2021 CS Lombardia Trophy, where he placed eighth. He went on to place sixth at the 2021 CS Denis Ten Memorial Challenge, second at the 2021 Volvo Open Cup, first at the 2021 Tallinn Trophy, and fifth at the 2021 CS Golden Spin of Zagreb.

After winning his third consecutive national title at the 2022 Estonian Championships, Selevko was nominated to represent Estonia at the 2022 Winter Olympics in Beijing, China.

At the Olympics, he dislocated his shoulder in training a couple of days before the short program of the men's event. He managed to compete but finished twenty-eighth in the segment and did not advance to the free skate.

Selevko closed his season at the 2022 Bellu Memorial, finishing ninth.

=== 2022–23 season: Grand Prix debut ===
Selevko started his season at the 2022 CS Nepela Memorial and the 2022 CS Budapest Trophy, placing seventh and eighth, respectively.

Making his debut on the Grand Prix series, Selevko competed at 2022 Skate Canada International, where he finished eighth. Following the withdrawal of Kazakhstan's Mikhail Shaidorov, Selevko was also called up to compete at the 2022 Grand Prix of Espoo. He would ultimately place tenth at the event. He went on to compete at the 2022 CS Golden Spin of Zagreb, finishing fifth.

At the 2023 Estonian Championships, Selevko won the silver medal behind his brother, Mihhail. He closed his season with a fourth-place finish at the 2023 International Challenge Cup.

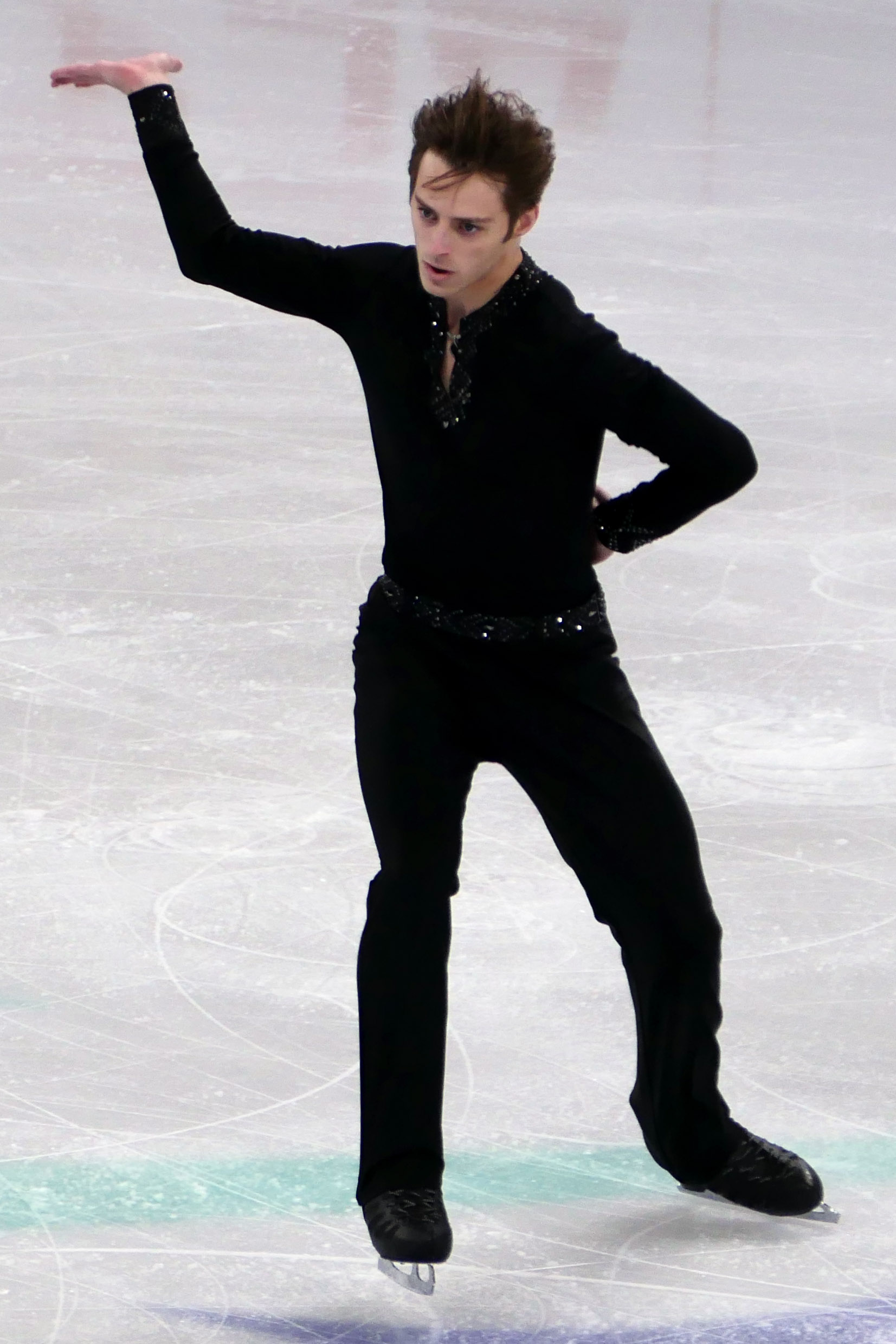
Selevko performing his short program at the 2024 World Championships

=== 2023–24 season: European silver ===
In two appearances on the Challenger circuit to start the season, Selevko won the bronze medal at the 2023 CS Finlandia Trophy and placed fifth at the 2023 CS Budapest Trophy. He was invited as a replacement to the 2023 NHK Trophy, where he finished eighth. Selevko won the bronze medal at the 2023 CS Golden Spin of Zagreb, earning a personal best short program score in the progress, and took the silver medal at the Estonian Championships.

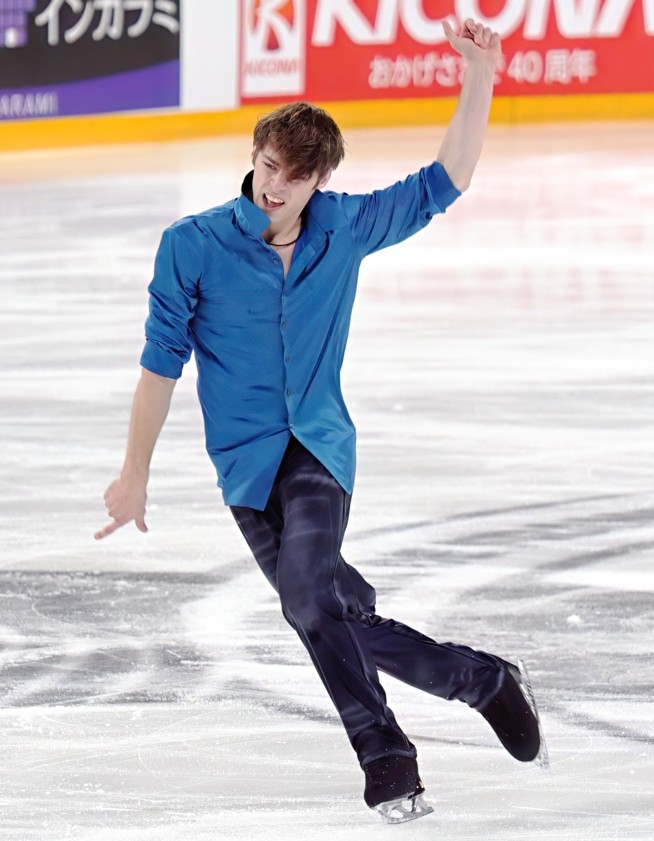
Selevko performing his short program at the 2024 Grand Prix de France

Selevko earned new personal bests in all three segments when he placed second at the 2024 European Championships in Kaunas, Lithuania, his best showing in his senior career. This marked Estonia's first ever medal at a senior ISU championship event. He described the result as leaving him "in shock." Selevko finished the season placing eleventh at the 2024 World Championships. In an April interview, Selevko said: "I didn't have high expectations for this season, especially after struggling with injuries for the past two years."

=== 2024–25 season ===
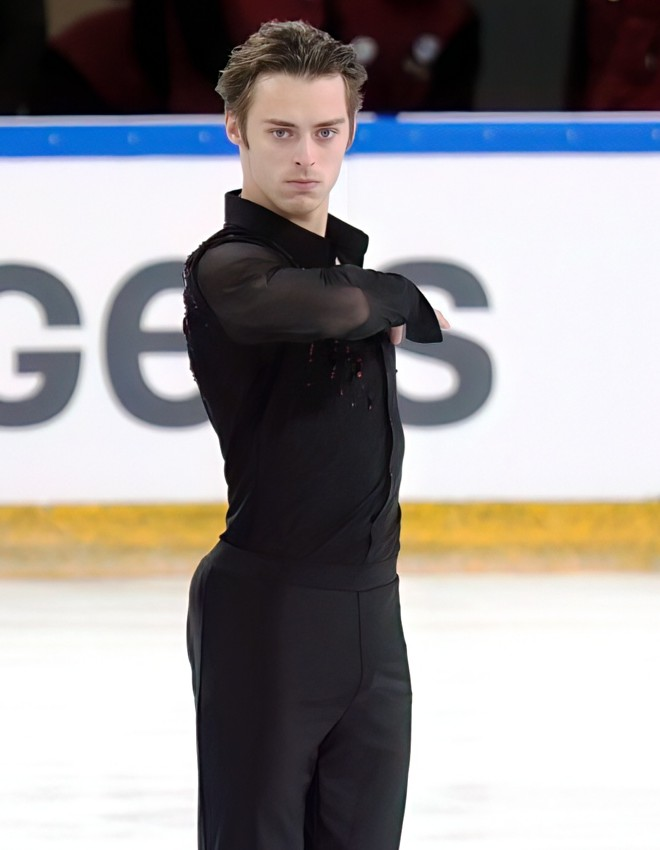
Selevko during his free skate at the 2024 Grand Prix de France

Selevko began the season by competing on the 2024–25 ISU Challenger Series, finishing ninth at the 2024 Lombardia Trophy and eighth at the 2024 Trophée Métropole Nice Côte d'Azur.

Going on to compete on 2024–25 Grand Prix circuit, Selevko placed second in the short program at the 2024 Grand Prix de France but seventh in the free skate, dropping to seventh-place overall. He followed this result up with another seventh-place finish at the 2024 Finlandia Trophy two weeks later.

In December, Selevko competed at the 2024 Golden Spin of Zagreb and the 2025 Estonian Championships, finishing second to his brother, Mihhail, at both events.

He then finished the season by placing ninth at the 2025 European Championships in Tallinn, Estonia.

=== 2025–26 season: Milano Cortina Olympics and Grand Prix silver ===
In July, it was announced that Selevko had moved to Norwood, Massachusetts, United States, where his new head coaches included Alexei Letov and Olga Ganicheva. He opened the season by competing on the 2025–26 ISU Challenger Series, winning the silver medal at the 2025 CS Cranberry Cup International and finishing ninth at the 2025 CS Trialeti Trophy.

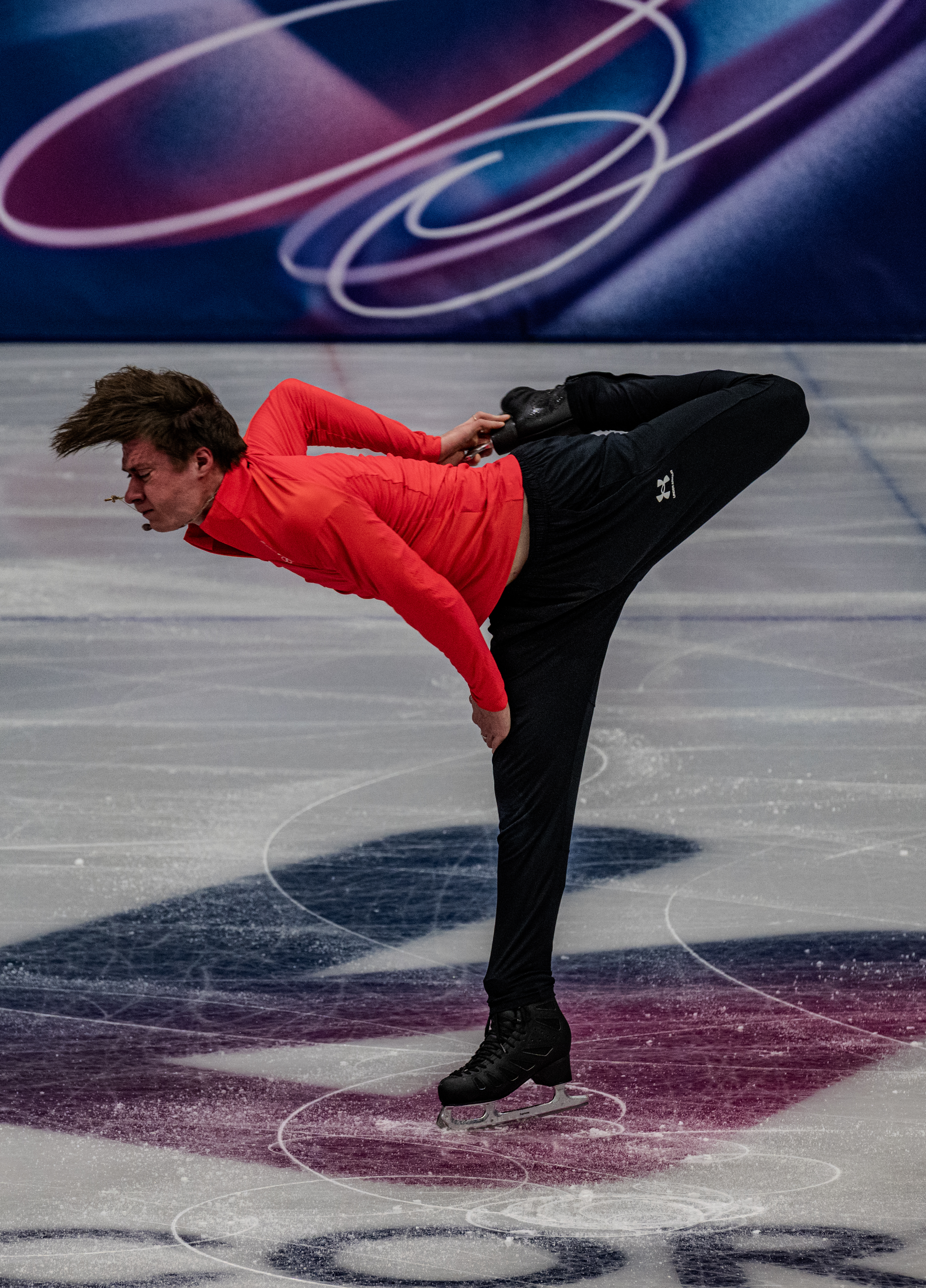
Selevko performing a donut spin during a practice session at the 2026 Winter Olympics

In October, Selevko earned the silver medal at 2025 Skate Canada International, scoring a new personal best in both the short program and combined total score. "When I came here, I didn't expect to be on the podium at all," he said. "I'm really happy with what I did today. It wasn't perfect, but I'm proud of my free skate." A couple weeks later, Selevko won the 2025 CS Tallinn Trophy.

In December, he won his fourth national title at the 2026 Estonian Championships. The following month, he competed at the 2026 European Championships, where he placed second in the short program and tenth in the free skate, slipping to fifth place overall just ahead of his brother, Mihhail. "Well, it wasn't my best performance for sure," noted the 24-year-old after the free skate. "It was really tiring. I was trying to invest to save points wherever it was possible." Following the event, Selevko was named to the 2026 Winter Olympic team. On 10 February, Selevko competed in the short program segment at the 2026 Winter Olympics where he fell on the first part of his planned triple Lutz combination, placing eighteenth in that segment. "I was happy with the first two elements and tried to recover in the spin after the two jumps, and I think I was definitely fine. I mean, it was a stupid mistake on the combination that cost me a lot of points, but yeah," he said following his performance. "[It's] very nice, of course, to be able to share this experience [with my girlfriend (Emily Chan)]. Of course, right now I'm more focused on the competition, but after Friday I can really support her."

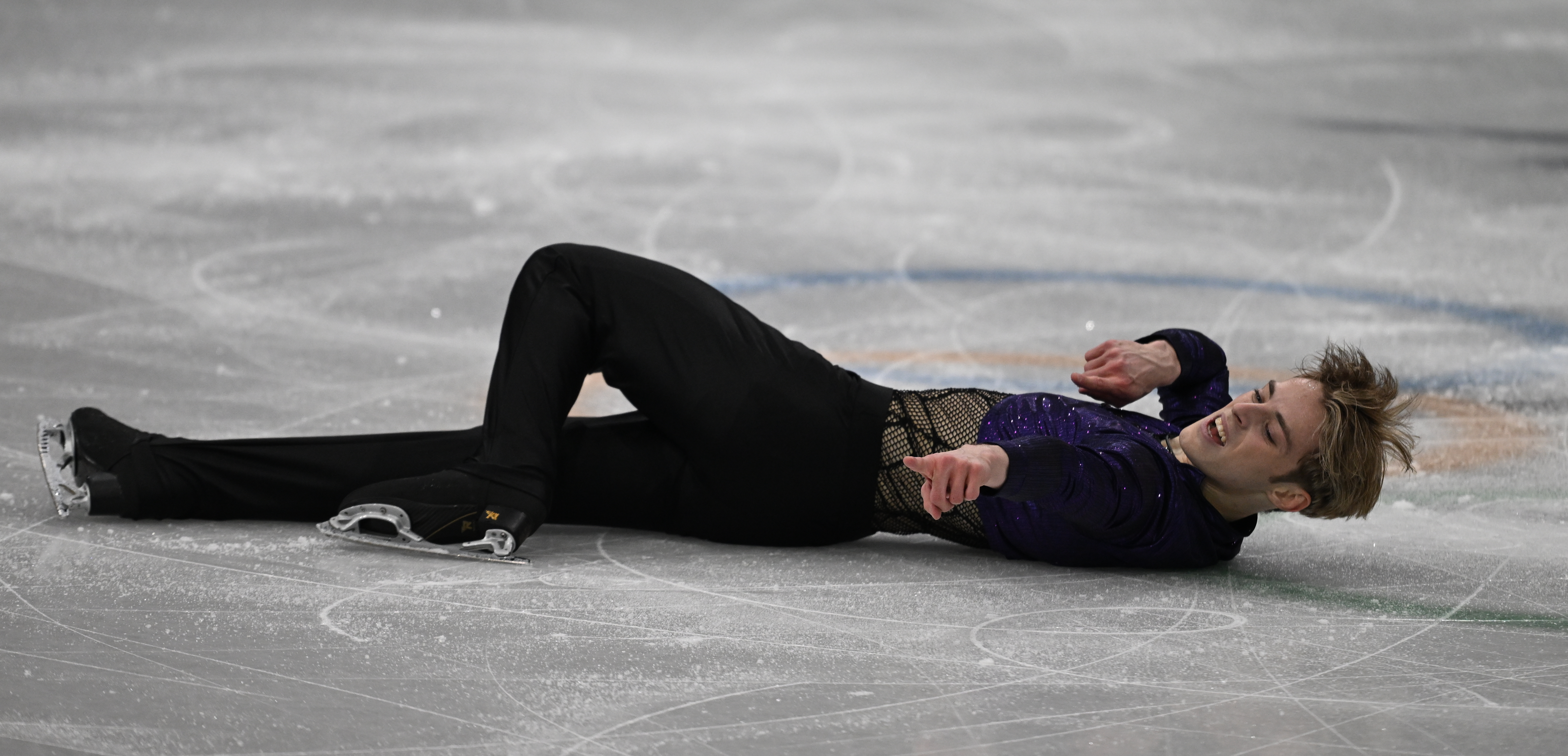
Selevko performing at the 2026 Winter Olympics

Two days later, Selevko placed sixteenth in the free skate after receiving a double downgrade on a triple Lutz, popping a planned triple Salchow into a double, and losing levels on all three of his spins. When asked about how he felt about his performance, he said, "It's hard for me to explain. I think maybe I lost my focus a little bit in the short program, and I made that mistake again. That's really sad at the end of the program. I made those awkward mistakes in the spin as well, and I've never had that problem before... But I'm really happy with the beginning of the program, two quads, two triple axels. I still have some time to work before Worlds."

The following month, Selevko placed sixth at the 2026 World Figure Skating Championships after finishing third in this short program and sixth in the free skate. He earned all-new personal best scores in his fourth outing at this event, and helped secure two spots for Estonia in the next year's World Championships. "I am really, really happy with my performance today," he said after the free skate. "Even if I wouldn't be in the top 8 or top 10, I would still be really happy because I delivered really good programs."

=== 2026–27 season ===
Selevko opened the season by winning the 2026 CS Cranberry Cup International. In October, he went onto compete at the 2026 Grand Prix de France. Selevko placed second in the short program, before later dropping to fourth place overall following the free skating segment. “I don’t know what happened,” the 25-year-old said after the free skate. “I don’t have an answer right now. I felt fine. I was nervous, but I was ready to go.”

== Programs ==
Season	Short program	Free skate	Exhibition	Ref.
2014–15	"Russian Sailors Dance" (from The Red Poppy) By Reinhold Glière	Charlie and the Chocolate Factory By Danny Elfman	—N/a	
2015–16	Once Upon a Time in Mexico By Robert Rodriguez	"Je suis malade" By Serge Lama	—N/a	
2016–17	Once Upon a Time in Mexico By Robert Rodriguez	"Je suis malade" By Serge Lama	—N/a	
2017–18	"I Step Out For A While" By Patrick Watson Choreo. by Valentin Molotov	"Caruso" Performed by Luciano Pavarotti Choreo. by Valentin Molotov	—N/a	
2018–19	"I Step Out For A While" By Patrick Watson Choreo. by Valentin Molotov	"Caruso" Performed by Luciano Pavarotti Choreo. by Valentin Molotov	—N/a	
2019–20	"I Step Out For A While" By Patrick Watson Choreo. by Valentin Molotov	"Le temps des cathédrales" Performed by Bruno Pelletier; "Les Sans-Papiers" Performed by Luck Mervil; "Danse Mon Esmeralda" Performed by Garou (from Notre-Dame de Paris) By Riccardo Cocciante & Luc Plamondon Choreo. by Valentin Molotov	—N/a	
2020–21	"Bout It" By Yung Joc & 3LW Choreo. by Denis Lunin	"Le temps des cathédrales" Performed by Bruno Pelletier; "Les Sans-Papiers" Performed by Luck Mervil; "Danse Mon Esmeralda" Performed by Garou (from Notre-Dame de Paris) By Riccardo Cocciante & Luc Plamondon Choreo. by Valentin Molotov	—N/a	
2021–22	"Bout It" By Yung Joc & 3LW Choreo. by Denis Lunin	"Nocturne in C-Sharp Minor, Op. 48"; "Nocturne in C-Sharp Minor B 49" All by Frédéric Chopin	—N/a	
2021–22	"I Step Out For A While" By Patrick Watson	"Nocturne in C-Sharp Minor, Op. 48"; "Nocturne in C-Sharp Minor B 49" All by Frédéric Chopin	—N/a	
2022–23	Egyptian Trap Mix By Badass & Dandy; Pharaoh Ramses II By Derek Fiechter; The Mummy's Curse By Vince Anthony Choreo. by Rostislav Sinicyn	The Pianist: "Nocturne in C Minor, Op. 48, No. 1"; "Nocturne in E Minor, Op.72, No. 1" By Janusz Olejniczak & Frederic Chopin Choreo. by Denis Lunin	—N/a	
2022–23	Egyptian Trap Mix By Badass & Dandy; Pharaoh Ramses II By Derek Fiechter; The Mummy's Curse By Vince Anthony Choreo. by Rostislav Sinicyn	"Ad Martem" By Balázs Havasi Choreo. by Rostislav Sinicyn	—N/a	
2023–24	Egyptian Trap Mix By Badass & Dandy; Pharaoh Ramses II By Derek Fiechter; The Mummy's Curse By Vince Anthony Choreo. by Rostislav Sinicyn	"Ad Martem" By Balázs Havasi Choreo. by Rostislav Sinicyn	Step Up By Aaron Zigman	
2024–25	"Why'd You Lie?" By Colin James and the Little Big Band Choreo. by David Wilson	"Pa' Que Te Oigan Bandoneón" By Héctor Varela; "Por una cabeza" By Carlos Gardel; "Tanguera" By Mariano Mores Choreo. by Rostislav Sinicyn; "Ad Martem" By Balázs Havasi Choreo. by Rostislav Sinicyn	Waterloo By ABBA; Waltz of the Flowers (from The Nutcracker) By Pyotr Ilyich Tchaikovsky; Can-can (from Orpheus in the Underworld) By Jacques Offenbach; Firestarter by The Prodigy	
2025–26	"Kiss" By Prince Choreo. by Adam Solya	"Adagio For Strings and Storm"; "The Longest Night in Limbo" By Nico Cartosio Choreo. by David Wilson, Sandra Bezic	"Why'd You Lie?" By Colin James and the Little Big Band Choreo. by David Wilson	
2026–27	"Michael Jackson Medley" Choreo. by Adam Solya	"Valley of the Yuccas"; "Solace" By Rüfüs Du Sol Choreo. by Jean-Luc Baker	Kiss by Prince and The Revolution	

== Competitive highlights ==
- GP – Event of the ISU Grand Prix Series
- JGP – Event of the ISU Junior Grand Prix Series
- CS – Event of the ISU Challenger Series
- TBD – Assigned
- WD – Withdrew from competition

Competition placements at senior level
Season	2016–17	2017–18	2018–19	2019–20	2020–21	2021–22	2022–23	2023–24	2024–25	2025–26	2026–27
Winter Olympics						28th				16th	
World Championships			27th	C	16th			11th		6th	
European Championships			17th	16th				2nd	9th	5th	
Estonian Championships			3rd	1st	1st	1st	2nd	2nd	2nd	1st	
GP Finland							10th		7th		
GP France									7th		4th
GP NHK Trophy								8th			
GP Skate America											8th
GP Skate Canada							8th			2nd	
CS Alpen Trophy			18th								
CS Budapest Trophy					3rd		8th	5th			
CS Cranberry Cup										2nd	1st
CS Denis Ten Memorial						6th					
CS Finlandia Trophy				5th				3rd			
CS Golden Spin of Zagreb			11th	5th		5th	5th	3rd	2nd		
CS Ice Star				4th							
CS Lombardia Trophy		16th				8th			9th		
CS Nebelhorn Trophy		18th			7th						1st
CS Nepela Memorial							7th				
CS Tallinn Trophy		9th	12th	2nd		1st				1st	
CS Trialeti Trophy										9th	
CS Trophée Métropole Nice									8th		
Abu Dhabi Classic Trophy								1st			
Bellu Memorial						9th					
Challenge Cup							4th				
Cup of Tyrol	15th										
Egna Spring Trophy	3rd										
Golden Bear of Zagreb	11th										
Jégvirág Cup			2nd								
Lõunakeskus Trophy								1st			
Nordic Championships			3rd								
Tallink Hotels Cup			2nd	3rd	1st						
Volvo Open Cup	8th					2nd					

Competition placements at junior level
Season	2014–15	2015–16	2016–17	2017–18	2018–19	2019–20
World Junior Championships		19th		27th		9th
Estonian Championships (Senior)	3rd	2nd				
Estonian Championships (Junior)	3rd	2nd	2nd	1st		1st
JGP Czech Republic	18th					
JGP Estonia	21st		6th			
JGP Germany			11th			
JGP Italy				15th		
JGP Latvia		20th				5th
JGP Poland				11th		8th
JGP Slovenia					15th	
European Youth Olympic Festival			6th			
Ice Star	7th	3rd				
Lombardia Trophy			4th			
Mentor Toruń Cup		4th				
Skate Helena	5th					
Tallinn Trophy		8th				
Volvo Open Cup		9th				
World Development Trophy	4th	4th				

== Detailed results ==
ISU personal best scores in the +5/-5 GOE System
Segment	Type	Score	Event
Total	TSS	270.42	2026 World Championships
Short program	TSS	96.49	2026 World Championships
Short program	TES	53.00	2026 World Championships
Short program	PCS	43.49	2026 World Championships
Free skating	TSS	173.93	2026 World Championships
Free skating	TES	89.78	2026 World Championships
Free skating	PCS	85.15	2026 World Championships

ISU personal best scores in the +3/-3 GOE System
Segment	Type	Score	Event
Total	TSS	192.79	2017 CS Tallinn Trophy
Short program	TSS	70.76	2017 CS Tallinn Trophy
Short program	TES	37.16	2017 CS Tallinn Trophy
Short program	PCS	33.60	2017 CS Tallinn Trophy
Free skating	TSS	122.04	2016 JGP Estonia
Free skating	TES	60.24	2017 JGP Poland
Free skating	PCS	69.10	2017 CS Tallinn Trophy

=== Senior level ===
Results in the 2014–15 season
Date	Event	SP		FS		Total	
Date	Event	P	Score	P	Score	P	Score
20–21 Dec 2014	(Estonia) 2014 Estonian Championships	3	39.48	3	72.31	3	111.79

Results in the 2015–16 season
Date	Event	SP		FS		Total	
Date	Event	P	Score	P	Score	P	Score
11–13 Dec 2015	(Estonia) 2015 Estonian Championships	2	52.35	3	94.30	2	146.65

Results in the 2016–17 season
Date	Event	SP		FS		Total	
Date	Event	P	Score	P	Score	P	Score
27–30 Oct 2016	(Croatia) 2016 Golden Bear of Zagreb	13	46.52	10	98.64	11	145.16
9–13 Nov 2016	(Latvia) 2016 Volvo Open Cup	10	55.06	8	97.06	8	152.12
28 Feb – 5 Mar 2017	(Austria) 2017 Cup of Tyrol	19	48.70	12	115.43	15	164.13
6–9 Apr 2017	(Italy) 2017 Egna Spring Trophy	3	60.64	2	103.61	3	164.25

Results in the 2017–18 season
Date	Event	SP		FS		Total	
Date	Event	P	Score	P	Score	P	Score
14–17 Sep 2017	(Italy) 2017 CS Lombardia Trophy	16	57.96	16	109.62	16	167.58
27–30 Sep 2017	(Germany) 2017 CS Nebelhorn Trophy	12	60.63	20	106.43	18	167.06
21–26 Nov 2017	(Estonia) 2017 CS Tallinn Trophy	5	70.76	9	122.03	9	192.79

Results in the 2018–19 season
Date	Event	SP		FS		Total	
Date	Event	P	Score	P	Score	P	Score
11–18 Nov 2018	(Austria) 2018 Alpen Trophy	18	58.07	17	107.10	18	165.17
26 Nov – 2 Dec 2018	(Estonia) 2018 CS Tallinn Trophy	12	60.88	13	117.69	12	178.57
5–8 Dec 2018	(Croatia) 2018 CS Golden Spin of Zagreb	12	61.87	10	124.22	11	186.09
14–16 Dec 2018	(Estonia) 2019 Estonian Championships	3	59.14	1	126.57	3	185.71
21–27 Jan 2019	(Belarus) 2019 European Championships	16	69.94	20	125.19	17	195.13
7–10 Feb 2019	(Sweden) 2019 Nordic Championships	4	59.86	3	117.82	3	177.68
15–17 Feb 2019	(Hungary) 2019 Jégvirág Cup	1	67.80	4	105.05	2	172.85
22–24 Feb 2019	(Estonia) 2019 Tallink Hotels Cup	3	63.79	2	137.29	2	201.08
18–24 Mar 2019	(Japan) 2019 World Championships	27	63.25	—N/a	—N/a	27	63.25

Results in the 2019–20 season
Date	Event	SP		FS		Total	
Date	Event	P	Score	P	Score	P	Score
11–13 Oct 2019	(Finland) 2019 CS Finlandia Trophy	7	67.63	3	139.18	5	206.81
18–20 Oct 2019	(Belarus) 2019 CS Ice Star	3	74.39	5	134.68	4	209.07
11–17 Nov 2019	(Estonia) 2019 Tallinn Trophy	3	65.17	1	138.21	2	203.38
4–7 Dec 2019	(Croatia) 2019 CS Golden Spin of Zagreb	4	76.18	5	145.76	5	221.94
13–15 Dec 2019	(Estonia) 2020 Estonian Championships	2	68.77	1	157.75	1	226.52
13–16 Feb 2020	(Estonia) 2020 Tallink Hotels Cup	2	81.50	3	138.02	3	219.52
20–26 Jan 2020	(Austria) 2020 European Championships	9	77.45	16	133.23	16	210.68

Results in the 2020–21 season
Date	Event	SP		FS		Total	
Date	Event	P	Score	P	Score	P	Score
23–26 Sep 2020	(Germany) 2020 CS Nebelhorn Trophy	8	69.92	6	141.56	7	211.48
15–17 Oct 2020	(Hungary) 2020 CS Budapest Trophy	3	71.55	5	133.33	3	204.88
30–31 Jan 2021	(Estonia) 2021 Estonian Championships	2	76.75	1	149.80	1	226.55
18–21 Feb 2021	(Estonia) 2021 Tallink Hotels Cup	1	77.30	1	147.63	1	224.93
22–28 Mar 2021	(Sweden) 2021 World Championships	24	70.74	15	151.32	16	222.06

Results in the 2021–22 season
Date	Event	SP		FS		Total	
Date	Event	P	Score	P	Score	P	Score
10–12 Sep 2021	(Italy) 2021 CS Lombardia Trophy	7	68.78	7	128.93	8	197.71
28–31 Oct 2021	(Kazakhstan) 2021 CS Denis Ten Memorial Challenge	8	67.52	5	133.51	6	201.03
3–7 Nov 2021	(Latvia) 2021 Volvo Open Cup	1	80.84	3	145.05	2	225.89
16–18 Nov 2021	(Estonia) 2021 Tallinn Trophy	1	75.05	1	134.05	1	209.10
4–5 Dec 2021	(Estonia) 2022 Estonian Championships	1	89.34	2	144.04	1	233.38
7–11 Dec 2021	(Croatia) 2021 CS Golden Spin of Zagreb	7	80.54	7	157.88	7	238.42
8–10 Feb 2022	(China) 2022 Winter Olympics	28	65.29	—N/a	—N/a	28	65.29
26–27 Feb 2022	(Romania) 2022 Bellu Memorial	7	67.35	9	110.18	9	177.53

Results in the 2022–23 season
Date	Event	SP		FS		Total	
Date	Event	P	Score	P	Score	P	Score
29 Sep – 1 Oct 2022	(Slovakia) 2022 CS Nepela Memorial	9	63.84	7	123.63	7	187.47
13–16 Oct 2022	(Hungary) 2022 CS Budapest Trophy	6	71.50	8	129.01	8	200.51
28–30 Oct 2022	2022 Skate Canada International	10	60.37	7	145.74	8	206.11
25–27 Nov 2022	(Finland) 2022 Grand Prix of Espoo	11	66.96	10	132.51	10	199.47
7–10 Dec 2022	(Croatia) 2022 CS Golden Spin of Zagreb	7	65.18	3	145.93	5	211.11
17–18 Dec 2022	(Estonia) 2023 Estonian Championships	1	84.62	2	143.15	2	227.77
23–26 Feb 2023	(Netherlands) 2023 International Challenge Cup	4	78.84	7	137.10	4	215.94

Results in the 2023–24 season
Date	Event	SP		FS		Total	
Date	Event	P	Score	P	Score	P	Score
4–8 Oct 2023	(Finland) 2023 CS Finlandia Trophy	4	79.51	3	158.74	3	238.25
13–15 Oct 2023	(Hungary) 2023 CS Budapest Trophy	3	79.93	7	137.92	5	217.85
24–26 Nov 2023	(Japan) 2023 NHK Trophy	9	75.85	7	145.58	8	221.43
6–9 Dec 2023	(Croatia) 2023 CS Golden Spin of Zagreb	2	83.58	3	140.66	3	224.24
16–17 Dec 2023	(Estonia) 2024 Estonian Championships	3	68.81	1	167.18	2	235.99
10–14 Jan 2024	(Lithuania) 2024 European Championships	3	90.05	3	166.94	2	256.99
8–11 Feb 2024	(Estonia) 2024 Lõunakeskus Trophy	1	80.54	1	133.64	1	214.18
15–18 Feb 2024	(United Arab Emirates) 2024 Abu Dhabi Classic Trophy	1	93.10	1	151.36	1	244.46
18–24 Mar 2024	(Canada) 2024 World Championships	12	84.08	9	163.49	11	247.57

Results in the 2024–25 season
Date	Event	SP		FS		Total	
Date	Event	P	Score	P	Score	P	Score
12–15 Sep 2024	(Italy) 2024 CS Lombardia Trophy	11	66.08	9	142.97	9	209.05
16–20 Oct, 2024	(France) 2024 CS Trophée Métropole Nice Côte d'Azur	3	83.32	13	125.56	8	208.88
1–3 Nov 2024	2024 Grand Prix de France	2	85.73	7	140.38	7	226.11
15–17 Nov 2024	(Finland) 2024 Finlandia Trophy	8	66.36	6	147.79	7	214.15
4–7 Dec 2024	(Croatia) 2024 CS Golden Spin of Zagreb	2	83.30	3	151.17	2	234.56
14–15 Dec 2024	(Estonia) 2025 Estonian Championships	2	80.41	2	160.36	2	240.77
28 Jan – 2 February 2025	(Estonia) 2025 European Championships	7	84.65	11	146.26	9	230.91

Results in the 2025–26 season
Date	Event	SP		FS		Total	
Date	Event	P	Score	P	Score	P	Score
7–10 Aug 2025	(United States) 2025 CS Cranberry Cup International	3	76.62	3	159.08	2	235.70
8–11 Oct 2025	(Georgia (country)) 2025 CS Trialeti Trophy	3	79.97	11	128.17	9	208.14
31 Oct – 2 Nov 2025	2025 Skate Canada International	3	91.28	2	165.93	2	257.21
25–30 Nov 2025	(Estonia) 2025 CS Tallinn Trophy	1	84.74	2	152.93	1	237.67
13–14 Dec 2025	(Estonia) 2026 Estonian Championships	1	92.69	1	164.24	1	256.93
13–18 Jan 2026	(United Kingdom) 2026 European Championships	2	88.71	10	143.75	5	232.46
10–13 Feb 2026	(Italy) 2026 Winter Olympics	18	82.02	16	154.80	16	236.82
24–29 Mar 2026	(Czech Republic) 2026 World Championships	3	96.49	6	173.93	6	270.42

Results in the 2026–27 season
Date	Event	SP		FS		Total	
Date	Event	P	Score	P	Score	P	Score
5–9 Aug 2026	(United States) 2026 CS Cranberry Cup International	1	87.65	1	158.50	1	246.15
24–26 Sep 2026	(Germany) 2026 CS Nebelhorn Trophy	1	81.56	1	164.68	1	246.24
23-25 Oct 2026	2026 Grand Prix de France	2	85.49	5	144.49	4	229.98
Nov 13–15, 2026	(United States) 2026 Skate America	8	81.02	7	149.66	8	230.86

=== Junior level ===
Results in the 2014–15 season
Date	Event	SP		FS		Total	
Date	Event	P	Score	P	Score	P	Score
3–6 Sep 2014	2014 JGP Czech Republic	18	37.66	17	68.46	18	106.12
24–27 Sep 2014	2014 JGP Estonia	21	41.74	21	74.74	21	116.48
17–19 Oct 2014	(Belarus) 2014 Ice Star	7	40.23	7	71.63	7	111.86
20–24 Jan 2015	(Serbia) 2015 Skate Helena	6	39.12	5	74.73	5	113.85
7–8 Feb 2015	(Estonia) 2015 Estonian Championships (Junior)	3	44.61	3	87.56	3	132.17
27–28 Mar 2015	(Poland) 2015 World Development Trophy	1	50.71	6	79.25	4	129.96

Results in the 2015–16 season
Date	Event	SP		FS		Total	
Date	Event	P	Score	P	Score	P	Score
27–29 Sep 2015	2015 JGP Latvia	16	43.78	20	74.32	20	118.10
8–11 Oct 2015	(Belarus) 2015 Ice Star	3	55.47	4	85.35	3	140.82
4–8 Nov 2015	(Latvia) 2015 Volvo Open Cup	8	41.17	8	76.95	9	118.12
17–22 Nov 2015	(Estonia) 2015 Tallinn Trophy	5	50.79	8	91.69	8	142.48
5–7 Feb 2016	(Estonia) 2016 Estonian Championships (Junior)	3	43.00	2	100.83	2	143.83
28 Feb – 5 Mar 2016	(Poland) 2016 Mentor Nestlé Nesquik Toruń Cup	5	47.69	4	95.31	4	143.00
14–20 Mar 2016	(Hungary) 2016 World Junior Championships	17	60.91	20	105.70	19	166.61
11–12 Apr 2016	(Poland) 2016 World Development Trophy	6	47.71	3	90.71	4	138.42

Results in the 2016–17 season
Date	Event	SP		FS		Total	
Date	Event	P	Score	P	Score	P	Score
8–11 Sep 2016	(Italy) 2016 Lombardia Trophy	5	50.10	4	104.30	4	154.40
28 Sep – 1 Oct 2016	2016 JGP Estonia	8	62.89	6	122.04	6	184.93
5–8 Oct 2016	2016 JGP Germany	16	49.71	9	114.85	11	164.56
6–8 Jan 2017	(Estonia) 2017 Estonian Championships (Junior)	2	62.51	2	110.30	2	172.81
13–15 Feb 2017	(Turkey) 2017 European Youth Olympic Winter Festival	4	55.03	6	93.70	6	148.73

Results in the 2017–18 season
Date	Event	SP		FS		Total	
Date	Event	P	Score	P	Score	P	Score
4–7 Oct 2017	2017 JGP Poland	15	54.95	8	119.32	11	174.27
11–14 Oct 2017	2017 JGP Italy	18	49.09	14	102.86	15	151.95
2–4 Feb 2018	(Estonia) 2018 Estonian Championships (Junior)	1	60.57	2	99.52	1	160.09
5–11 Mar 2018	(Bulgaria) 2018 World Junior Championships	27	54.90	–	–	27	54.90

Results in the 2018–19 season
Date	Event	SP		FS		Total	
Date	Event	P	Score	P	Score	P	Score
3–6 Oct 2018	2018 JGP Slovenia	13	53.38	15	95.94	15	149.32

Results in the 2019–20 season
Date	Event	SP		FS		Total	
Date	Event	P	Score	P	Score	P	Score
4–7 Sep 2019	2019 JGP Latvia	5	69.19	6	124.81	8	194.00
18–21 Sep 2019	2019 JGP Poland	8	66.63	8	119.23	8	185.86
1–2 Feb 2020	(Estonia) 2020 Estonian Championships (Junior)	1	83.83	1	136.91	1	220.74
2–8 Mar 2020	(Estonia) 2020 World Junior Championships	4	80.87	13	126.13	9	207.00
