= Inclusive Skating =

Skating with Disabilities Charity

- Formation: September 9, 2011; 15 years ago
- Founder: Margarita Sweeney-Baird BEM
- Type: Charitable Incorporated Organisation
- Registration no.: SC042584
- Headquarters: Clyde Offices, 48 West George Street, Glasgow G2 1BP.
- Region served: International
- Website: https://inclusiveskating.org/
- Formerly called: Impaired Skating

Inclusive Skating is a charity that provides opportunities for skaters with additional needs. They cater to skaters of all levels, ranging from first-timers to recreational skaters, to elite competitive level athletes and hold events on a global scale which utilise their own judging framework developed for judging skaters who have additional challenges.

== Background ==
Founded in 2011 as Impaired Skating, the charity renamed itself to Inclusive Skating following feedback from its members.

Inclusive Skating's main objective is the advancement of public participation in sport and the promotion of equality and diversity and the development and implementation of programming which fosters the inclusion of skaters with any form of impairment or disability. They offer events, competitions, seminars, workshops, and E-Learning resources for its skaters, coaches, parents, and volunteers.

The club structure has been officially recognised by the Scottish Parliament, where they are an active member of the Cross-Party Group on Sport.

Inclusive skating advocates for the inclusion of skating in the Paralympic Games.

== Activities ==
Since 2021 their courses have been endorsed by CIMSPA and from 1 September 2025 they are also a Licensed Organisation for The Duke of Edinburgh's Award for physical, skills, volunteering, residential camps and expeditions. In 2023 IS became an SQA approved centre with successful candidates eligible to earn UCAS points. In 2026 Inclusive Skating became a Recognised International Federation and signed an historic MOU with The International Blind Sports Federation.

== Judging Framework ==
This Inclusive Skating judging framework is the first in the world for judging sports which takes into account all types of impairments. Currently, the framework facilitates the inclusion of skaters with conditions including physical disability, visual impairment, sensory challenges, autism, cerebral palsy, cystic fibrosis, genetic disorders and mental and behavioural impairments, among others. They also offers the option for skaters to compete via pre-recorded video, to accommodate for conditions which might impede upon an athlete's ability to compete live, such as anxiety.

== Events ==
Inclusive Skating holds educational events, workshops, seminars, and competitions. Competition events are held for all skating disciplines including: singles free-skating, pairs, ice dancing, solo ice dancing, figures, Synchronized skating, speed skating, inline skating, and off-ice competitive events. These competitions utilise the IS judging system which allows for fair competition between skaters with different disabilities using a compensation system based on the empirically researched Dr. Rondinelli Guides to the Evaluation of Permanent Impairment from the American Medical Association.

Prince Edward, president of the Sport and Recreation Alliance, was also a guest of honour at the Scottish Championship event in 2019.

Inclusive Skating's event format has been adopted by the International Skating Union. In 2022 Inclusive Skating became an institutional partner with the ISU for World Ice Skating Day holding the 2022 Virtual World Championships as part of the global celebration.

Inclusive Skating held the First World Inclusive Skating Championships in Hamilton, Scotland in 2023. The 2024 and 2025 World Inclusive Skating Championships were held in Lee Valley Ice Centre in London, England. The World Inclusivepara Skating Championships were held in Ostersund, Sweden during 2023 and 2024. The 2025 event is being held in East Kilbride Olympia Ice Rink in June during the Festival in the lead up to Commonwealth Games and has a permit from Virtus Sport.

The Inclusivepara Skating format provides competition opportunities for elite athletes with all forms of disability. The Inclusive Skating developmental competition pathway based on levels includes opportunities for Special Olympics athletes with intellectual disabilities.

== Membership ==
Inclusive Skating is a member of the following organisations:

- Scottish Sports Association
- Welsh Sports Association
- Northern Ireland Sports Forum
- Sport and Recreation Alliance
- Scottish Council for Voluntary Organisations
- Health and Social Care Alliance Scotland
