= Yasmine Kimiko Yamada =

Swiss figure skater

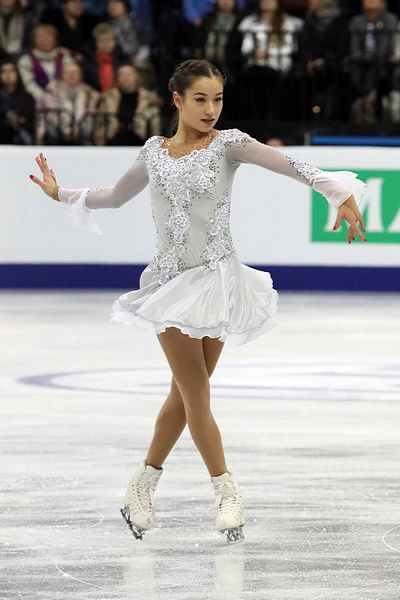
- Yamada at the 2019 European Championships

Personal information
- Born: 30 August 1997 (age 29) Zürich, Switzerland
- Height: 1.58 m (5 ft 2 in)

Figure skating career
- Country: Switzerland
- Coach: Igor Samohin, Stanislav Samohin
- Began skating: 2002

Medal record
Swiss Championships
Gold medal – first place	2017 Lucerne	Singles
Silver medal – second place	2019 Wetzikon	Singles
Silver medal – second place	2022 Lucerne	Singles
Bronze medal – third place	2016 Lausanne	Singles
Bronze medal – third place	2018 Neuchâtel	Singles
Bronze medal – third place	2020 Biel/Bienne	Singles

Yasmine Kimiko Yamada (born 30 August 1997) is a Swiss figure skater. She is the 2019 Open Ice Mall Cup champion, the 2016 Sportland Trophy bronze medalist, the 2019 Open d'Andorra bronze medalist, and the 2017 Swiss national champion. She competed in the final segment at the 2019 European Championships.

== Career ==
Yamada began learning to skate in 2002. Making her junior international debut, she took the bronze medal at the NRW Trophy in December 2011. Coached by Bettina Ariza-Hügin in Zürich, she competed at her first ISU Junior Grand Prix assignment in September 2012, placing 15th in Istanbul, Turkey.

Yamada's senior international debut came in November 2014 at the NRW Trophy. She trained in Switzerland under Ariza-Hügin until 2015. Igor Samohin began coaching her in California in the 2015–2016 season. Yamada won the bronze medal at the Sportland Trophy in early March 2016. Later in the same month, she appeared at her first ISU Championship, placing 34th at the World Championships in Boston.

In the 2016–2017 season, Yamada became the Swiss national champion. She placed 27th at the 2017 European Championships in Ostrava, Czech Republic, and 33rd at the 2017 World Championships in Helsinki, Finland.

== Programs ==
Season	Short program	Free skating
2020–2021	Is It a Crime by Sade	Vuelvo al sur; Invierno Porteño by Astor Piazzolla
2019–2020	Summertime by George Gershwin performed by MFSB	Chess by Benny Andersson and Björn Ulvaeus
2018–2019	Is It a Crime by Sade	Chess by Benny Andersson and Björn Ulvaeus
2016–2018	Why Don't You Do Right?	Je suis malade performed by Lara Fabian
2015–2016	Danzarin by Tango Lorca	Je suis malade performed by Lara Fabian
2014–2015	Adiós Nonino by Astor Piazzolla	Yellow River Piano Concerto
2013–2014	Adiós Nonino by Astor Piazzolla	Peer Gynt Suite No. 1, Op. 46 Morning Mood by Edvard Grieg
2012–2013	Butterfly Lovers' Violin Concerto by Chen Gang, He Zhanhao	Peer Gynt Suite No. 1, Op. 46 Morning Mood by Edvard Grieg

== Competitive highlights ==
CS: Challenger Series; JGP: Junior Grand Prix

International
Event	11–12	12–13	13–14	14–15	15–16	16–17	17–18	18–19	19–20	20–21	21–22	22–23
Worlds					34th	33rd						
Europeans						27th		15th	19th		18th	
CS Alpen Trophy								20th				
CS Cup of Tyrol										C		
CS Finlandia						18th						
CS Golden Spin								8th				9th
CS Lombardia							17th				6th	
CS U.S. Classic					15th	11th						
CS Warsaw Cup						17th			WD			17th
Bavarian Open					8th			6th				
Budapest Trophy											7th	
Challenge Cup						16th		WD	9th	8th		
Coupe Printemps						6th						
Crystal Skate								12th				
Cup of Tyrol							5th					
Dragon Trophy											2nd	
EduSport Trophy									3rd			
Hellmut Seibt					12th							
Merano Cup						7th	7th					
NRW Trophy				14th						10th	7th	
Open d'Andorra									3rd			
Open Ice Mall								1st				
Philadelphia					8th							
Prague Ice Cup									4th			
Santa Claus Cup						6th						
Sportland Trophy					3rd							
Tirnavia Ice Cup												6th
Volvo Open Cup							6th					
Warsaw Cup								6th				
International: Junior
JGP Czech Rep.				20th								
JGP Slovakia			19th									
JGP Turkey		15th										
Bavarian Open	2nd	3rd	6th									
Cup of Nice		9th										
Ice Challenge			3rd									
Merano Cup				4th								
NRW Trophy	3rd											
National
Swiss Champ.		5th	7th	6th	3rd	1st	3rd	2nd	3rd	C	2nd	4th
J = Junior level; WD = Withdrew; C = Event Cancelled
