= Mina Zdravkova =

Bulgarian ice dancer

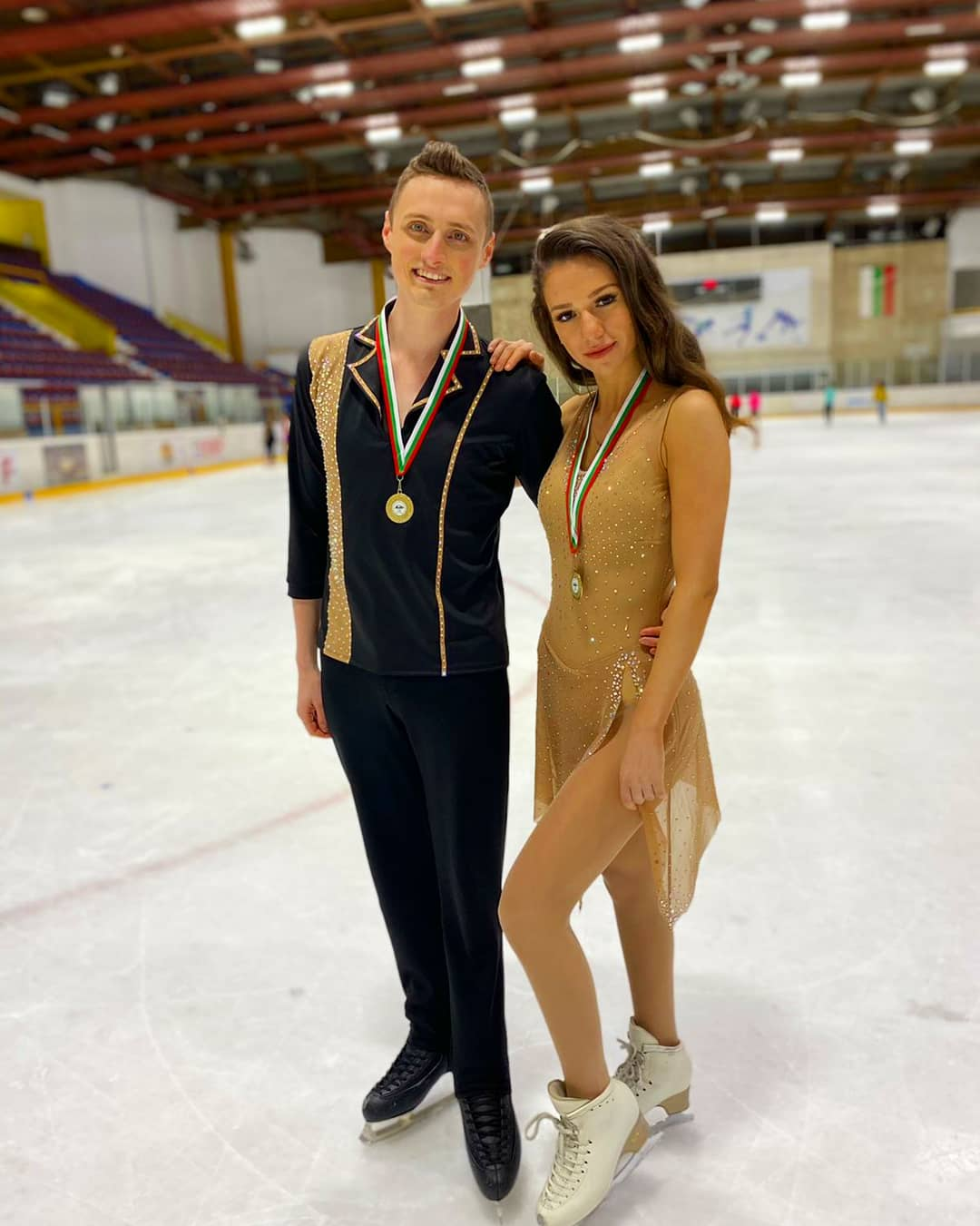
- Zdravkova and Davis at the 2020 Bulgarian Figure Skating Championships

Personal information
- Native name: Мина Здравкова
- Born: 9 February 1999 (age 27) Varna, Bulgaria
- Height: 1.67 m (5 ft 6 in)

Figure skating career
- Country: Bulgaria
- Partner: Christopher Martin Davis
- Coach: Marika Humphreys-Baranova, Vitaliy Baranov
- Skating club: Denkova Staviski - Dance on Ice
- Began skating: 2003

Mina Zdravkova (Bulgarian: Мина Здравкова) (born 9 February 1999) is a competitive ice dancer for Bulgaria. With partner Christopher Martin Davis, she is the 2020 Bulgarian National Champion, Bronze Medallist at the 2019 NRW Trophy, Silver Medallist at the 2020 Jégvirág Cup, and representative for Bulgaria at the 2020 European Championships, and 2021 World Figure Skating Championships. In her early career as a junior, Zdravkova represented Great Britain, partnered with Henry Aiken, attaining the Silver Medal at the 2013 British Junior National Championships.

== Personal life ==
Zdravkova was born in Varna, Bulgaria. She is the daughter of retired Bulgarian World Cup footballer Radoslav Zdravkov. Zdravkova has received international attention for her beauty and is frequently featured in lists of the most beautiful athletes.

== Early career ==
Zdravkova started skating with Henry Aiken in 2011. With Aiken she competed on the ISU Junior Grand Prix circuit and won the silver medal at the 2013 British Figure Skating Championships.

== Career ==
In 2014 Zdravkova partnered with Christopher Davis. Together they won the 2014/15 Bulgarian junior ice dance title. In 2015, Davis sustained a serious shoulder injury for which he underwent keyhole surgery in the USA. Post surgery, a significant recovery and rehab period was required away from the ice. The surgery was not successful, and the injury returned early in the 2016/17 season. A second surgery was conducted in Bulgaria in 2016 and was successful at abating any further problems. Starting in 2016 Zdravkova and Davis were coached solely by Marika Humphreys-Baranova and Vitaliy Baranov. Zdravkova and Davis returned to national level competition at the 2016/17 Bulgarian figure skating championships where they reclaimed their title. In 2018 Zdravkova and Davis first performed a program set to Bulgarian folk music. Their performance of this program at the 2019 Winter Universiade went viral in Bulgaria in 2019, amassing millions of views. During the 2019/20 season, Zdravkova and Davis qualified and competed at the 2020 European Figure Skating Championships placing 25th. The team also qualified for the 2020 World figure skating championships, but the event was cancelled due to COVID-19. Due to COVID-19 Zdravkova and Davis were unable to train on the ice for over 7 months. During this time they trained off-ice and made several PSAs for Bulgarian media urging compliance with public health safety measures. In December 2020, the Bulgarian National Championships were postponed until February 2021. Zdravkova and Davis reclaimed their title and were named to the world team. Zdravkova and Davis competed at the 2021 World Figure Skating Championships which were held in a bubble for the first time due to COVID-19 safety precautions, and placed 31st.

== Results ==
=== With Christopher Martin Davis for Bulgaria ===
International
Event	14–15	16–17	17–18	18–19	19–20	20–21
Worlds					C	31st
Europeans					25th	
Winter Universiade				13th		
CS Finlandia Trophy				11th		
CS Lombardia Trophy		7th				
CS Inge Solar Memorial				14th		
NRW Trophy					3rd	
Jégvirág Cup					2nd	
Bosphorus Cup			4th		10th	
Ice Star				7th		
Halloween Cup				6th	6th	
Volvo Open Cup					8th	
Santa Claus Cup			10th		8th	
Open d'Andorra			10th			
Mentor Toruń Cup					15th	
Egna Dance Trophy					11th	
International: Junior
Bavarian Open	15th					
Mentor Toruń Cup	21st					
National
Bulgarian Champ.	1st		1st		1st	1st

=== With Henry Aiken for Great Britain ===
International: Junior
Event	12–13	13–14
JGP Slovenia	17th	
NRW Trophy	27th (J)	
JGP Mexico Cup		7th
Ice Challenge		10th (J)
National
British Junior National Championships	5th	2nd

== Music and competitive routines ==
=== With Christopher Martin Davis ===
Season	Short/Rhythm Dance	Free Dance
2014/15	Samba & Latin rhythms Loca [changed to La Tortura later in season] (Shakira) Hay Amores (Shakira) Hips Don't Lie (Shakira: Bambo remix)	Gladiator Soundtrack : Gladiator (Hans Zimmer & Lisa Gerrard)
2015/16	Waltz and Polka And The Waltz Goes On (Andrei Reiu) Polka (Unknown)	Beyoncé inspired medley Drunk in Love (Post modern jukebox) At Last (Beyoncé) Crazy in Love (Beyoncé: 50 Shades of Grey Soundtrack) Crazy in Love (Emilie Sande: Great Gatsby Soundtrack)
2016/17	Blues and Hip-Hop I Put a Spell on You (Nina Simone) I Put a Spell on You (Young Bosnia Trap Remix)	Arabian Inspired Sirocco (Momo & Christophe Goze) Caleludemco (Bruno Montal) Layali (Al Sharq)
2017/18	Rhumba & Latin rhythms Samba Vocalizado (Luciano Perrone) Safari (J Balvin) Abre Que Voy (Miguel Enriquez)	Chicago Movie Musical Cell Block Tango All I Care About Is Love
2018/19	Tango & Spanish rhythms Selections from Carmen (Bizet)	Bulgarian Folk Music Ergen Deda (Pendara Ethno Project) Vecherai Rado (Slavi Trifanov, Desislava Dobreva & Ki-Ki Bend)
2019/20	Quickstep & related rhythms From Chicago Movie Musical Funny honey (Rene Zelweiger) We both reached for the gun (Richard Gere & ensemble) Nowadays/hot honey rag (Catherine Zeta Jone, Rene Zelweiger)	Bulgarian Folk Music Ergen Deda (Pendara Ethno Project) Vecherai Rado (Slavi Trifanov, Desislava Dobreva & Ki-Ki Bend)

=== With Henry Aiken ===
Season	Short Dance	Free Dance
2012/13	Blues and Swing It Don't Mean A Thing (Puppini Sisters)	Selections from Tarzan - Disney Movie Soundtrack (Phil Colins)
2013/14	Quickstep and Foxtrot Puttin' on the Ritz (Fred Astaire - Club des Belugas Remix) Cheek to Cheek (Fred Astaire) Cheek to Cheek (DJ Disse & Betina Bager, featuring Fred Astaire)	Alice in Wonderland Soundtrack (Danny Elfman) Introduction - Edward Scissorhands Motion Picture Soundtrack (Danny Elfman)
